= Targeted killing by Israel =

Targeted killing (Hebrew: סיכול ממוקד, romanized: sikul memukad, lit. 'focused foiling'), or assassination is a tactic that Israel has used during the Israeli–Palestinian conflict, the Iran–Israel proxy conflict, and other conflicts.

Logo used by the Israel Defense Forces to announce targeted killings of Hamas, Hezbollah and Houthi members since 2024.

Logo used by the Israel Defense Forces to announce targeted killings of the Iranian Ayatollah regime.

When carrying out targeted killings, the Israeli government refers to these operations as “eliminations”. Individuals who are killed in such operations are described as having been “eliminated”, using the term “Husal” (Hebrew: חוסל, pronounced [χuˈsal]).

These operations have often been described by Israeli officials as preventive or counterterrorism measures, while these measures have been criticized by critics of the Israeli government's actions, particularly when conducted outside Israel’s borders or in areas of ongoing conflict.

== History ==
The term "targeted killing" gained widespread use in 2000 during the Second Intifada, when Israel became the first state to publicly outline a policy of "liquidation" and "preemptive targeted killing" in November 2000.

Before 2001, Israel denied it practiced or had a policy of conducting extrajudicial executions. Israel first publicly acknowledged its use of the tactic at Beit Sahour near Bethlehem in November 2000, when four laser-guided missiles from an Apache helicopter were used to kill a Tanzim leader, Hussein Abayat, in his Mitsubishi pickup truck, an attack that also killed two 50-year-old housewives waiting for a taxi and wounded six other Palestinians. The witnessed use of an attack helicopter forced the public acknowledgement, unlike assassinations of targets by snipers.

B'tselem has calculated that Israel targeted and killed 234 Palestinians, killing another 153 as collateral casualties, between 2002 and May 2008. Most Israeli targeted killings have taken place in Area A of the West Bank, which is under the jurisdiction of the Palestinian National Authority. Some of the killings listed below have been denied by Israel. Most fall within a series of campaigns, including Mossad assassinations following the Munich massacre, Israeli actions in the wake of the Second Intifada (2000–2005), and strikes during the 2008–09 Gaza War. According to reports, as part of the long-term cease-fire terms negotiated between Israel, Hamas and other Palestinian groups to end the 2014 Gaza War, Israel pledged it would desist from its targeted killings against Palestinian militants and faction leaders.

== Policy ==
At the outset of the Second Intifada in 2000, it was reported that Ariel Sharon obtained an understanding from the administration of George W. Bush that the American government would support Israeli efforts to assassinate Palestinians if Israel would stop building settlements in the occupied West Bank. In the face of suicide bombings, Sharon no longer took evidence of potential involvement by the target in future attacks on Israel as decisive, and the decision was left to the discretion of the Prime Minister and Shin Bet.

The Supreme Court of Israel, in response to a lawsuit on the practice, mainly regarded actions in the Palestinian Territories, ruled on 14 December 2006 that such actions took place in an 'international armed conflict' but that the militants, as civilians, lacked combatant status under international law. Yet they were, in the court's view, civilians participating directly in hostilities, which would mean they lose their immunity. It also ruled, following a precedent set forth by the European Court of Human Rights in its McCann and Others v United Kingdom judgement, that the 'law of proportionality', balancing military necessity with humanity, must apply. Assassinations were permitted if "strong and persuasive information" concerning the target's identity existed; if the mission served to curtail militancy; and if other techniques, such as attempting to arrest the target, would gravely endanger soldiers' lives.

According to the former Legal Advisor to the State Department Judge Abraham Sofaer:

...killings in self-defense are no more "assassinations" in international affairs than they are murders when undertaken by our police forces against domestic killers. Targeted killings in self-defense have been authoritatively determined by the federal government to fall outside the assassination prohibition.

A state engaged in such activities must, however, Sofaer concluded, openly acknowledge its responsibility and accept accountability for mistakes made.

This characterization is criticized by many, including Amnesty International.

The Israeli army maintains that it pursues such military operations to prevent imminent attacks when it has no discernible means of making an arrest or foiling such attacks by other methods. On 14 December 2006, the Supreme Court of Israel ruled that targeted killing is a legitimate form of self-defense against militants, and outlined several conditions for its use.

The practice of targeted killing developed after World War II, throughout which Israel has exercised the option more than any other Western democratic countries, according to Israeli investigative journalist Ronen Bergman.

== Methods ==
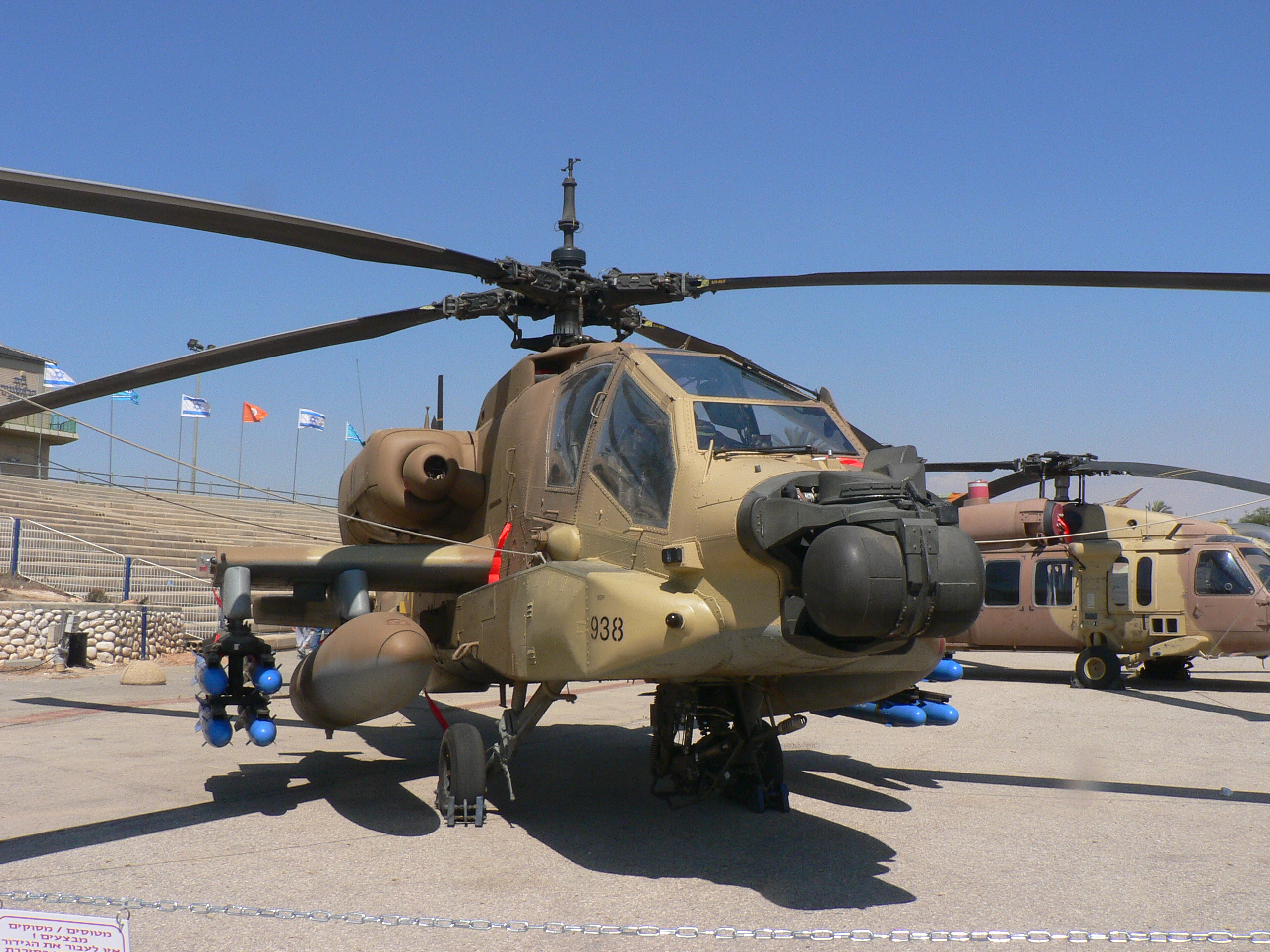
The AH-64 Apache helicopter gunship, which is used to carry out many of the targeted killings, due to its ability to shoot guided munitions

Since then, the Israeli Air Force has often used attack helicopters, mainly the AH-64 Apache, to fire guided missiles toward the target. The Shin Bet supplies intelligence for the target. Sometimes, when heavier bombs are needed, the strike is carried out by F-16 fighter jets. Other strategies employ strike teams of Mossad or military operatives. These operatives infiltrate areas known to harbor targeted individuals, and eliminate their assigned targets with small arms fire or use of explosives. Snipers have also been utilized, as was in the case of Dr. Thabet Thabet in 2001.

Unmanned combat aerial vehicles have also been used for strikes.

== Targets ==
Notable targeted killings by the Israeli military were Hamas leaders Jamil Jadallah (October 2001), Mahmoud Abu Hanoud (November 2001), Salah Shahade (July 2002), Ibrahim al-Makadmeh (March 2003), Ismail Abu Shanab (August 2003), Ahmed Yassin (March 2004), Abdel Aziz al-Rantissi (April 2004) and Adnan al-Ghoul (October 2004), all targeted during the Second Intifada.

While the term "targeted killing" usually describes airborne attacks, Israeli security forces have killed top Palestinian militants in the past by other means, although this has never been confirmed officially. Other notable targeted killing involving multiple targets include Mossad assassinations following the Munich massacre against Black September Organization and PLO personnel alleged to have been directly or indirectly involved in the 1972 Munich massacre, which led to the Lillehammer affair; and then Operation Spring of Youth against top PLO leaders in Beirut in 1973, namely Muhammad Najjar, Kamal Adwan, and Kamal Nasser.

== Civilian casualty ratio ==
According to the Israeli Human Rights organization B'Tselem, which uses data independent of the Israeli military, Israeli targeted killings claimed 425 Palestinian lives between September 2000 and August 2011. Of these, 251 persons (59.1 percent) were the targeted individuals and 174 (40.9 percent) were civilian bystanders. This implies a ratio of civilians to targets of 1:1.44 during the whole period.

The civilian casualty ratio of the targeted killings was surveyed by Haaretz military journalist Amos Harel. In 2002 and 2003, the ratio was 1:1, meaning one civilian killed for every target killed. Harel called this period "the dark days" because of the relatively high civilian death toll as compared to later years. He attributed this to an Israeli Air Force (IAF) practice of attacking targets even when they were located in densely populated areas. While there were always safety rules, argued Harel, these were "bent" at times in view of the target's importance.

According to Harel, the civilian casualty ratio dropped steeply to 1:28 in late 2005, meaning one civilian killed for every 28 targets killed. Harel credited this drop to the new IAF chief Eliezer Shkedi's policies. The ratio rose again in 2006 to 1:10, a fact that Harel blamed on "several IAF mishaps". However, in 2007 and 2008 the ratio dropped to a level of less than 1:30, or 2–3 percent of the total casualties being civilian. Figures showing an improvement from 1:1 in 2002 to 1:30 in 2008 were also cited by Jerusalem Post journalist Yaakov Katz. Professor Alan Dershowitz of Harvard Law School stated that the 2008 figure of 1:30 represents the lowest civilian to combatant casualty ratio in history in the setting of combating militancy. Dershowitz criticized the international media and human rights organizations for not taking sufficient note of it. He also argued that even this figure may be misleading because not all civilians are innocent bystanders.

However, in a July 2011 article published in the Michigan War Studies Review, "Targeted Killings: A Modern Strategy of the State", A.E. Stahl and William F. Owen wrote that casualty ratios and death counts in general should be considered skeptically. Stahl and Owen state: "A caveat: reported death counts and casualty ratios should be approached with skepticism. Statistics are too easy to manipulate for political purposes, vitiating arguments based on them."

According to Neve Gordon, Israel's approach to proportionally has undergone a significant change since 2008. In 2002 an outcry occurred when 14 other people were killed when Israel targeted and killed Salah Shehade. Since the beginning of the Gaza war, he adds, the IDF has authorised the killing up to and over 100 civilians whenever a single senior Hamas commander is targeted. The purpose of this strategy would be to effect a change in international law by repeatedly establishing a new precedent. In support of his view, Gordon cites a former head of the IDF's International Law Department, Colonel Daniel Reisner, who, in 2009, stated that the aim was: ’a revision of international law. If you do something for long enough, the world will accept it. The whole of international law is now based on the notion that an act that is forbidden today becomes permissible if executed by enough countries.’

== Controversies relating to the strategy of targeted killings ==
The exact nature of the proof required by the Israelis for the killings is classified, as it involves clandestine military intelligence-oriented means and operational decisions. All Mossad targeted killings must have the approval of the Prime Minister, rather than being a part of a published justice system executed by lawyers and judges. International law provides two distinct normative paradigms which govern targeted killings in situations of law enforcement and the conduct of hostilities. As a form of individualized or surgical warfare, the method of targeted killing requires a "microscopic" interpretation of the law regulating the conduct of hostilities which leads nuanced results reflecting the fundamental principles underlying international humanitarian law. Any targeted killing not directed against a legitimate military target remains subject to the law enforcement paradigm, which imposes extensive restraints on the practice and even under the paradigm of hostilities, no person can be lawfully liquidated without further considerations.

=== Proponents of targeted killings ===
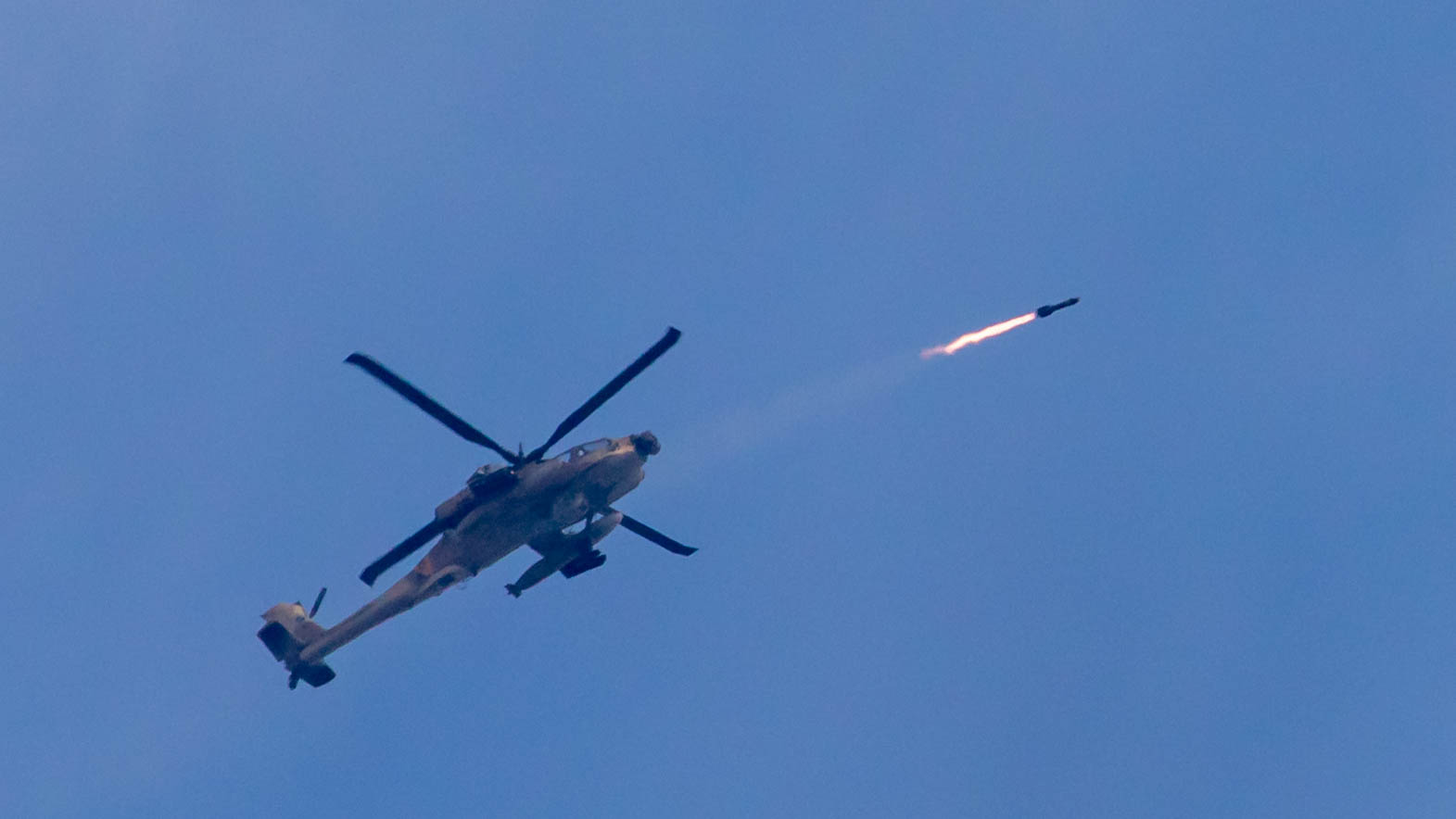
Israeli Air Force AH-64 Apache helicopter gunship launches an AGM-114 Hellfire missile at a "terror cell" of rocket launchers in action

Proponents of the strategy argue that targeted killings are within the rules of war. They contend they are a measured response to militancy, that focuses on actual perpetrators of militant attacks, while largely avoiding innocent casualties. They point out that targeted killings prevented some attacks against Israeli targets, weakened the effectiveness of militant groups, kept potential bomb makers on the run, and served as deterrence against militant operations. They also argue that targeted killings are less harmful toward Palestinian non-combatants than full-scale military incursion into Palestinian cities. The IDF claims that targeted killings are only pursued to prevent future militants acts, not as revenge for past activities as such they are not extrajudicial. The IDF also claims that this practice is only used when there is absolutely no practical way of foiling the future acts by other means (e.g., arrest) with minimal risk to its soldiers or civilians. The IDF also claims that the practice is only used when there is a certainty in the identification of the target, in order to minimize harm to innocent bystanders. They argue that because many of the Palestinians who have targeted Israel over the years have enjoyed the protection of Arab governments, extraditing them for trial in Israel has often proved impossible. They argue that Israeli governments have long used targeted killings as a last resort, when there were no peaceful options for bringing suspected militants to account. In a 2010 article in Infinity Journal, it was argued that targeted killings are a strategy that entails "limited, force in support of policy" and that the strategy has proven to work, albeit within specific contexts. The context of the Infinity Journal article related specifically to Hamas' calls for ceasefires and "calms" in 2004 after the majority of their leadership had been successfully targeted by Israeli forces. According to the article, "Targeted Killings Work", Israeli targeted killings throughout "the 2000–2005 armed rebellion represented a successful strategy" because "the tactics never undermined Israeli policy enough to alter Israel's overall political objectives" and because Hamas' will to continue with armed violence was temporarily broken.

=== Opponents of targeted killings ===
Opponents of Israel's policy of targeted killings claim that it violates the laws of war. They argue that these targeted killings are extrajudicial, which violates the norms and values of a democratic society.

Some question whether the IDF claims of no other way is correct and debate the secret process of IDF deliberations. Moreover, many feel that actual injury and death of innocent bystanders, unintended as they may be, makes a strong claim against targeted killings. Some hold that such strikes do not reduce militancy, but encourage more recruits to join militant factions, and are a setback to the Middle East peace process.

=== Rule of law ===
In 2006, Israel's Supreme Court rejected a petition to declare targeted killings illegal. The court recognized that some killings violated international law, but the legality of individual operations must be assessed on a "case by case basis". It also said its decision that caution was needed to prevent civilian casualties. "Innocent civilians should not be targeted," it said. "Intelligence on the (targeted) person's identity must be carefully verified." The court also allowed for the possibility of compensation claims from civilians.

Defenders of this practice argue that the Palestinian National Authority has not lived up to its treaty agreements to crack down on militants and has even aided them in escaping Israeli authorities. As such in a legal opinion, Israeli attorney general Elyakim Rubinstein wrote: "The laws of combat which are part of international law, permit injuring, during a period of warlike operations, someone who has been positively identified as a person who is working to carry out fatal attacks against Israeli targets, those people are enemies who are fighting against Israel, with all that implies, while committing fatal terror attacks and intending to commit additional attacks—all without any countermeasures by the PA."

Gal Luft of the Institute for the Analysis of Global Security has argued that because the Palestinian National Authority is not a state, and because few governments recognize Hamas' control in Gaza, the Israeli-Palestinian conflict is not bound by the set of norms, rules, and treaties regulating other state conflicts. John Podhoretz has written for the New York Post that if the conflict were between states, targeted killing would be in accordance with the Fourth Geneva Convention (Part 3, Article 1, Section 28) which reads: "The presence of a protected person may not be used to render certain points or areas immune from military operations." Podhoretz therefore argues that international law explicitly gives Israel the right to conduct military operations against military targets under these circumstances.

Opponents of Israeli targeted killings, among them human rights groups and members of the international community including Britain, the European Union, Russia, France, India, China, Brazil, South Africa and all Arab States, have stated that targeted killings violate international laws and create an obstruction to the peace process.

Authors Howard Friel, Richard Falk, and Palestinian representatives to the United Nations Security Council regard targeted killings as extrajudicial killing, and argue that it is a rejection of the rule of law and due process. They defend that in international law assassination was outlawed in both the 1937 convention of for the Prevention and Repression of Terrorism and the 1973 New York convention.

== Israeli public opinion ==
IDF reports show that from the start of the Second Intifada (in 2000) to the year 2005, Palestinians killed 1,074 Israelis and wounded 7,520. Such losses generated immense public pressure from the Israeli public for a forceful response, and the Israeli increase in targeted killings was one such outcome. Targeted killings are largely supported by Israeli society. A poll published by Maariv newspaper in July 2001 found that 90 percent of Israeli public supported the practice.

== Effectiveness ==
According to A.E. Stahl of the International Institute for Counter-Terrorism, the number of Hamas attacks increased between 2001 and 2005, during the campaign of targeted killings. Although the total number of Hamas operations increased, deaths from attacks decreased from a high of 75 in 2001, to 21 in 2005. For example, after the targeting of Ahmed Yassin in 2004, there was a severe increase in the number of attacks carried out (an increase of 299 attacks) yet there were only 4 suicide attacks, a decrease from the previous year. According to the report by A.E. Stahl, a Research Fellow at the International Institute for Counter-Terrorism, following the targeted operation against Yassin, "Suicide terrorism by Hamas decreased by five and the total number of deaths caused by suicidal terrorism also declined by 19. Though the total number of attacks increased the total number of deaths decreased severely: attacks rose by 299 but deaths fell by 27."

Targeted killings may also have been effective, as is witnessed in the political reactions of Hamas. Stipulations were demanded by Hamas in the form of Tahadiyehs and Hudnas. It seems Hamas was "forced to operate at reduced levels of efficiency" and was eventually forced to agree to a Tahadiyeh, likely due to targeted killings.

== See also ==
- Anat Kamm–Uri Blau affair
- Counterterrorism
- Extrajudicial killing
- Manhunt (military)
- Operation Damocles
- Targeted killing
- Targeted Killing in International Law
- Targeted Killings: Law and Morality in an Asymmetrical World
- Rise and Kill First: The Secret History of Israel's Targeted Assassinations
- If someone comes to kill you, rise up and kill him first
- Human rights violations against Palestinians by Israel
- Dariush Rezaeinejad

== Sources ==
- Katz, Yaakov; Bohbot, Amir [in Hebrew] (2017). The Weapon Wizards: How Israel Became a High-Tech Military Superpower. St. Martin's Press. ISBN 978-1-250-08834-5.
- Hammer, Joshua (2004). A Season in Bethlehem: Unholy War in a Sacred Place. Simon and Schuster. ISBN 978-0-743-25604-9.
- Melzer, Nils (2008). Targeted Killing in International Law. Oxford University Press. ISBN 978-0-199-53316-9.
- Stahl, A.E.; Owen, William F. (Winter 2010). "Targeted Killings Work". Infinity Journal. 1 (1): 10–13. doi:10.64148/msm.v1i1.3 – via Military Strategy Magazine.
