= July and August 2011 Karachi targeted killings =

Terrorist incident in Pakistan

Jul and Aug 2011 Karachi target killings
- Location: Karachi, Pakistan
- Date: 6 July 2011 to mid August 2011, violence subdued as of September 2011
- Target: Various ethnic groups
- Attack type: Targeted killings
- Weapon: Automatic weapons
- Deaths: ~344
- Injuries: Hundreds

During the months of July and August 2011, a number of targeted killings in Karachi, Pakistan left hundreds of people dead. The attacks are part of an ongoing terrorist campaign of political, ethnic and religious violence that has gripped the city in its worst form in the recent years. The targeted killings of Shias in Pakistan have been described by international human rights groups as a genocide. Since 1963, the government of Pakistan estimates more than 23,000 Shias have been killed in Pakistan, however, that number is widely believed to be a vast undercount. In mid-July, ANP politicians accused the MQM expelling 3–4,000 Pashtuns out of their neighbourhoods. Dawn reported in 29 August that ethnic Pashtuns were leaving Karachi due to the violence.

== July ==
Continuous target killings in the month of July claimed the lives of over 300 people. The high death toll in July made it one of the deadliest months in almost two decades in the history of Karachi – in fighting linked to ethnic and religious tensions that plague the city.

The shooting incidents, starting from 6 July, were perpetrated by unknown gunmen and fired indiscriminately in various neighbourhoods throughout the city. In the third day alone, at least 27 people were shot dead, in what was described as one of the worst days the city was witness to since the PPP-led coalition government came into power.

On July, 11 a night of violence resulting in 12 deaths. The violence was triggered by a government minister, Zulfiqar Mirza, who launched a verbal assault on the Muttahida Qaumi Movement (MQM), Mirza's aggressive remarks were so extreme that members of his own party had to physically remove him from a press conference.

During the course of the attacks, some three buses were fired upon; some shootings were conducted in Orangi Town, causing many suburban locals to vacate their homes and flee to safer areas. All of the attackers managed to escape immediately after the crime.

According to HRCP, businesses usually run by Pashtuns, or Pukhtuns, such as pushcarts, trucks, roadside restaurants, and rickshaws were often targeted, regardless of whether they were affiliated to a political party. By July 12, up to 100 people were killed. These attacks were indiscriminate and involved automatic machine guns, grenades and rocket launchers. According to a rickshaw driver, Fazal Ayaz, "Sometimes, I tell my passengers I won't go to certain areas where they are shooting people who look Pashtuns. But this is my bread and butter."

The President summoned a meeting of top officials to discuss the ongoing violence and find a solution. The attack was condemned by a number of people in the media. Meanwhile, the Muttahida Qaumi Movement, one of the large mainstream political parties which dominate the politics of Karachi, threatened to call a strike if the government did not do enough to combat the incident.

Karachi has seen a number of target killings, most of which are allegedly politically motivated and usually carried out against political workers affiliated with political parties. Random shooting incidents however, like these attacks, are not as frequent and raise concerns over the deteriorated security situation of the city.

== August ==
In the month of August, 44 more people were killed in non-stop shootings. Most of the victims were members of the Muhajir community, the largest ethnic group in Karachi.

== See also ==
- Target killings in Pakistan
- Targeted Killing in International Law
- Targeted Killings: Law and Morality in an Asymmetrical World
- 2019 Ghotki riots
- 2009 Gojra riots
