= Targeted killings in Pakistan =

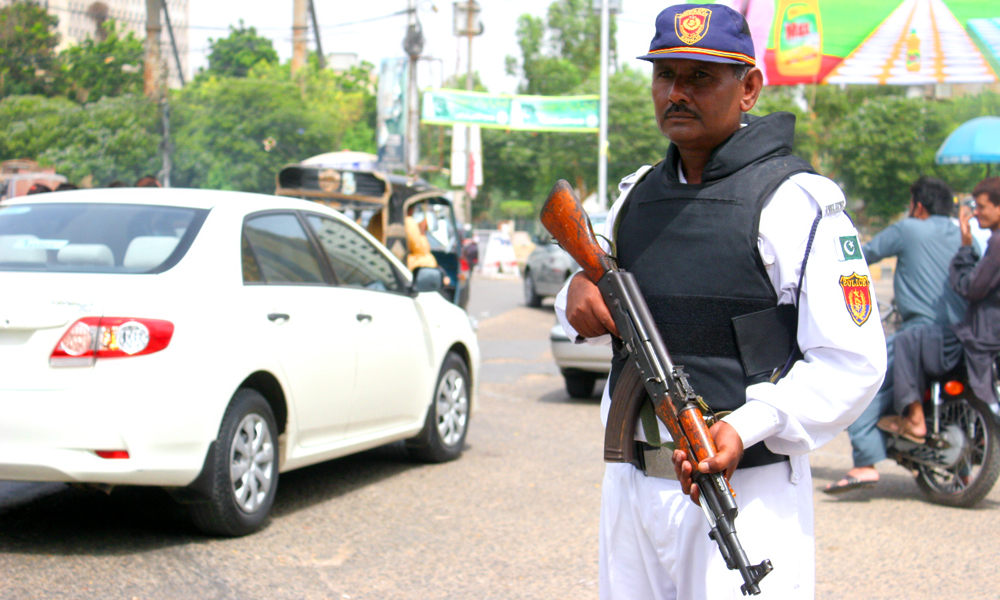
Karachi Traffic Police

Targeted killings in Pakistan (Urdu: ہدفی ہلاکتیں) have been a rising form of violence and have contributed to security instability in the country. They have become common and have gained attention especially in Karachi, Pakistan's largest city, economic capital and capital city of the Sindh province. Several targeted killings have also occurred in Quetta, the capital of the southern province of Balochistan. Police and law enforcement agencies have sometimes come under criticism for their ineffectiveness in locating the perpetrators and investigating their motives. For most part, targeted killings in Karachi have been attributed to political, religious and ethnic reasons. There are speculations about the killing but no real proof has been found against any party.

== Overview ==
Karachi is a cosmopolitan city and consists of many ethnic communities; the city's demographics play an important role in its politics. Ethnic politics have resulted in sporadic violence throughout Karachi's history, often leading to bloody conflicts. Following the independence of Pakistan in 1947, Muslim immigrants from areas constituting modern-day India migrated in large numbers to the Muslim nation of Pakistan and became settled in Karachi, the historical capital of the Sindh province. The early migrants who came and settled are known as Muhajirs, something which was resented by a portion of the province's native Sindhi people and radical Sindhi nationalists. After the breakaway of East Pakistan in 1971 and the formation of Bangladesh, Pakistan accepted a large number of Biharis (known as "Stranded Pakistanis") loyal to the country, trapped in Bangladesh and offered them citizenship. The Bihari migrants assimilated into the diverse Urdu-speaking Muhajir population. Some Bengalis in Pakistan also stayed behind. The Pashtuns (Pakhtuns or Pathans), originally from Khyber Pakhtunkhwa, FATA and northern Balochistan, are now the city's second largest ethnic group in Karachi after Muhajirs. With as high as 7 million by some estimates, the city of Karachi in Pakistan has the largest concentration of urban Pakhtun population in the world, including 50,000 registered Afghan refugees in the city. As per current demographic ratio Pashtuns are about 25% of Karachi's population. Religious minorities often face violence and target killing in Pakistan, even though the country's Constitution guarantees them equal rights and the freedom to practice their faith.

Karachi's status as a regional industrial centre attracted migrants from other parts of Pakistan as well, including Punjab, Balochistan and Pashtun migrants from the frontier regions. Added to this were Iranians, Arabs, Central Asians as well as thousands of Afghan refugees who came to Karachi, initially displaced by the Soviet invasion of Afghanistan; some of the Afghan and Pashtun migration brought along conservative tribal culture, further intensifying ethnic and sectarian violence and also giving rise to mob culture.

== Prominent victims of target killings ==
This list is incomplete. Please help expand this list.

- Benazir Bhutto
- Murtaza Bhutto
- Athar Ali (scientist)
- Ameer Faisal Alavi
- Muhammad Abdullah Ghazi
- Arshad Sharif
- Wali Khan Babar
- Rustam Jamali
- Safdar Kiyani
- Khalid Shahanshah
- Hussain Ali Yousafi
- Sabeen Mahmud
- Perween Rahman
- Hakeem Muhammad Saeed
- Maulana Yusuf Ludhianvi
- Amjad Sabri
- Ali Raza Abidi
- Liaquat Ali Khan
- Salman Taseer
- Afzal Kohistani

== See also ==
- Gun politics in Pakistan
- Persecution of Hazara people
- Missing persons (Pakistan)
- July 2011 Karachi target killings
- Targeted Killing in International Law
- Targeted Killings: Law and Morality in an Asymmetrical World
