= Targeted Killings =

2012 book edited by Claire Finkelstein, Jens David Ohlin, and Andrew Altman

- Targeted Killings book cover
- Author: Claire Finkelstein; Jens David Ohlin; Andrew Altman
- Original title: Targeted Killings: Law and Morality in an Asymmetrical World
- Language: English
- Subject: Targeted killing
- Genre: Law
- Publisher: Oxford University Press
- Publication date: 30 April 2012
- Publication place: United Kingdom
- Media type: Hardcover
- Pages: 440
- ISBN: 978-0199646470
- OCLC: 757147167
- LC Class: 2012933286

Targeted Killings: Law and Morality in an Asymmetrical World is a non-fiction compilation book about targeted killing edited by Claire Finkelstein, Jens David Ohlin, and Andrew Altman. It was published by Oxford University Press in 2012. The book grew out of contributions by the authors to a conference in April 2011 at the University of Pennsylvania Law School. Targeted Killings features eighteen essays in five sections arranged by topic. The work argues that after the 11 September attacks by Al-Qaeda in 2001, the United States and other countries began to see the tactic of targeted killing differently. The practice of targeted killing had previously been accepted in situations of self-defence in military settings; after 11 September 2001 it was used to kill non-combatants and those not directly involved in a particular armed force.

The book begins with a discussion of targeted killing of non-combatants, followed by discussions of legalities, the rationale of self-defence, the choice of targets, and when and whether the ends can be used to justify the means. Several contributors defend targeting of non-combatants, while Jeremy Waldron discusses the morality associated with the tactic and argues against its use. Jeff McMahan identifies the problematic nature of targeted killing and emphasizes regulations for law enforcement to avoid abuse of process. Richard V. Meyer writes that any entity wishing to carry out targeted killing should first have to declare war on the targeted parties. Kevin H. Govern examines the elimination of Osama bin Laden and identifies this killing as justified and the product of a rational decision-making process. In the final portion of the book, Fernando Tesón says that targeted killing is particularly justified against terrorists because they use tactics specifically designed to kill civilians.

The book was well received in law reviews and by academics across multiple disciplines. Robin Geiß and Steven J. Barela praised its coverage of the legal, moral, political, and strategic aspects of targeted killings. Steven R. Ratner welcomed its addition to the academic literature, and Madeline E. Cohen wrote that it would be a useful reference for additional research. Abraham David Sofaer praised its treatment of the subject and tables, though he argued the book could have given more weight to the law enforcement model of the use of deadly force against individuals.

== Background ==
Targeted Killings: Law and Morality in an Asymmetrical World developed as an outgrowth from a conference in April 2011 that focused on philosophy and law. The conference took place at the Institute for Law and Philosophy of the University of Pennsylvania. Experts in the fields of public policy, politics, military regulations, battlefield knowledge, law, ethics, and philosophy discussed contemporaneous issues surrounding targeted killing in society. The conference was titled "Using Targeted Killing to Fight the War on Terror: Philosophical, Moral, and Legal Challenges" and was organized by the University of Pennsylvania Law School.

At the time of the book's initial print publication date, its editor Andrew Altman worked as Professor of Philosophy at Georgia State University and concurrently as director of research at the Jean Beer Blumenfeld Center for Ethics. Claire Finkelstein was the Algernon Biddle Professor of Law and Professor of Philosophy at the University of Pennsylvania and concurrently as co-director of the University of Pennsylvania Institute of Law and Philosophy. Jens David Ohlin was employed as an associate professor of law at Cornell Law School. Ohlin's work had been published in academic journals, including the American Journal of International Law, the Columbia Law Review, and the Harvard International Law Journal. He wrote the 2008 book Defending Humanity: When Force is Justified and Why with George Fletcher, which was also published by Oxford University Press.

Targeted Killings: Law and Morality in an Asymmetrical World was published in hardcover format by Oxford University Press on 30 April 2012. A paperback version was published at the same time. It was also published as an e-book for the Amazon Kindle by Amazon.com on 1 March 2012. In September 2012, the work was published at Oxford Scholarship Online.

== Content summary ==
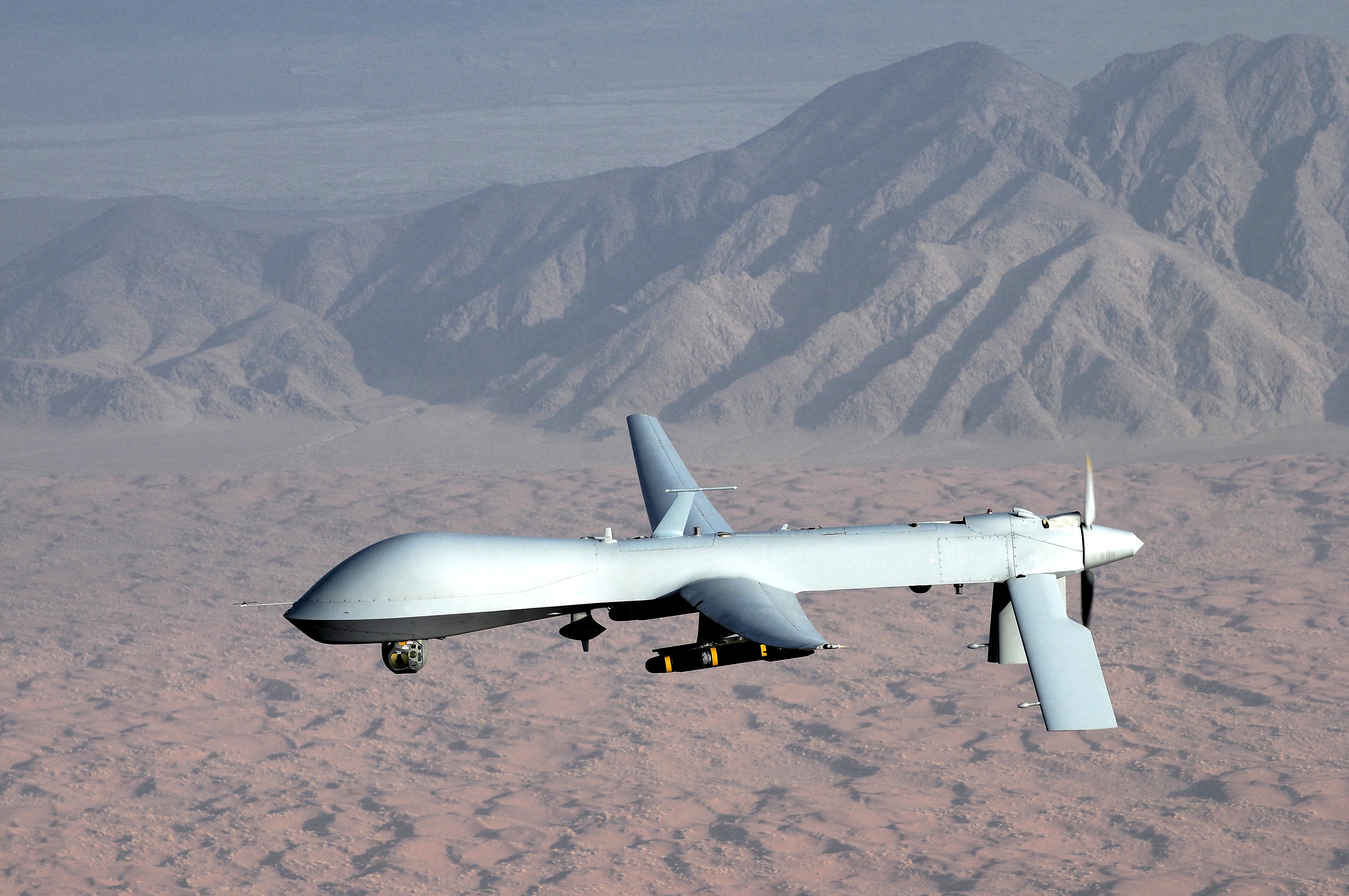
A Predator drone, a weapon used in targeted killings

Targeted Killings: Law and Morality in an Asymmetrical World begins with an introduction by Andrew Altman. This is followed by eighteen essays broken into five sections arranged by topic. The work says that after the Al-Qaeda attacks in the United States on 11 September 2001, the US and other countries began to see the tactic of targeted killing differently. The practice of targeted killing had previously been accepted in situations of self-defense in military settings; after the attacks it was used to kill non-combatants and those not directly involved in a particular armed force.

The first section of the book is a discussion of targeted killing of non-combatants. In an essay titled "Rebutting the Civilian Presumption: Playing Whack-a-Mole Without a Mallet?", Colonel Mark Maxwell criticizes the opposition of the International Committee of the Red Cross (ICRC) to targeted killing. Maxwell writes that individuals may indeed serve a combat task without being a member of a particular state force. He argues for an extension of the definition of combatant to include those who arm themselves and engage in combat roles. "Targeting Co-Belligerents" by professor Jens David Ohlin supports Maxwell's opinion and describes an analytical viewpoint called "linkage" in which he states armed terrorists and members of organizations can be killed. Ohlin interprets the guidelines of the ICRC to include reliance upon a military system of identification of combatants. "Can Just War Theory Justify Targeted Killing" by professor Daniel Statman is an analysis of three thought processes used to discuss targeted killing rules: "contractualist", "collectivist", and "individualist". Statman writes that the tactic of targeted killing is a just form of combat in each of these analyses. New York University and Oxford University professor Jeremy Waldron deconstructs the morality associated with the tactic and argues against its use. He says that similar rationalizations could be used by the enemy against those conducting the targeted killings, there may be an inherent selection bias of targets, and warns of a slippery slope when defending an actor that uses the methodology.

In the second portion of the book, a group of articles discuss which sets of laws should be used to regulate targeted killing. Philosophy professor Jeff McMahan of Rutgers University asks, "Targeted Killing: Murder, Combat or Law Enforcement?". He says that eliminating enemies for purposes of self-defense is justified. McMahan writes about the problematic nature of targeted killing and emphasizes regulations for law enforcement to avoid abuses of process. University of Pennsylvania law and philosophy professor Claire Finkelstein writes in "Targeted Killing as Preemptive Action" about the difficulties of rationalizing targeted killing outside of the realm of typical combat between state actors. Finkelstein characterizes people as noncombatants unless they are a member of a group that includes identification through standardized attire and criminal behaviour patterns. Mississippi College School of Law professor Richard V. Meyer writes that current regulations and standards for targeted killing are inadequate. He says that any entity wishing to carry out targeted killing should first have to declare war on the targeted parties involved.

The book's third group of essays analyzes the rationale of self-defence as a justification for targeted killing. Washburn University School of Law professor Craig Martin writes in "Going Medieval: Targeted Killing, Self-Defense and the Jus ad Bellum Regime" that self-defence is not an appropriate rationale for targeted killing because such a justification is restricted to conflicts between state actors. University of Tulsa School of Law professor Russell Christopher writes in "Imminence in Justified Targeted Killing" that self-defence should be ruled out as a suitable position in several examples of potential conflict. He critiques arguments by governments including the United Kingdom and the United States that self-defense can be used as a rationalization of action against imminent danger. Western Washington University emeritus philosophy professor Phillip Montague says in an essay titled "Defending Defensive Targeted Killings" that use of this tactic against combatants can be seen as defensible and justified acts against terrorism or those who assist terrorist organizations.

The fourth portion of the book discusses how to make specific choices in targeted killing situations prior to state actors carrying out actions against individuals. University of Utah S.J. Quinney College of Law professor Amos N. Guiora discusses "The Importance of Criteria-Based Reasoning in Targeted Killing Decisions" and concludes that instead of combatant commanders in the field, lawyers in consultation with decision algorithms must make decisions on targets. Pepperdine University School of Law professor Gregory S. McNeal critiques the arguments of those against targeted killing in his essay, "Are Targeted Killings Unlawful? A Case Study in Empirical Claims Without Empirical Evidence". He differentiates between decision-making processes of the United States military and those of the Central Intelligence Agency, emphasizing the U.S. military tactic of attempting to avoid collateral damage. Ave Maria School of Law associate professor Kevin H. Govern examines the killing of Osama bin Laden in his piece "Operation Neptune Spear: Was Killing Bin Laden a Legitimate Military Objective?". He says this particular killing was justified and borne out of a rational decision-making process. American University Washington College of Law professor Kenneth Anderson distinguishes the use of military drones from targeted killing in his article "Efficiency in Bello and ad Bellum: Making the Use of Force Too Easy?". He says targeted killing as response to threats and to prevent potential terrorist attacks is justified.

The final portion of the book analyzes consequentialism within the scope of normative ethics and deontological ethics. Florida State University Tobias Simon Eminent Scholar Fernando Tesón writes in his essay "Targeted Killing in War and Peace: A Philosophical Analysis" that targeted killing is particularly justified against terrorists because they use tactics specifically designed to kill civilians. University of Illinois law and philosophy professor Michael Moore says in "Targeted Killings and the Morality of Hard Choices" that targeted killing can be seen as justified through both deontological and consequentialist models. University of Pennsylvania School of Law professor Leo Katz writes in "Targeted Killing and the Strategic Use of Self-Defense" that there is a danger of a state government artificially generating instances in which it asserts it must use targeted killing in self-defense. He warns against situations in which governments find it easier to kill terrorists than to put them through due process of law. Katz concludes that current regulations support targeted killing because existing law does not consider his argument and justifies the tactical elimination of terrorists.

== Reception ==
Targeted Killings: Law and Morality in an Asymmetrical World was reviewed in the European Journal of International Law by University of Potsdam international and European law professor Robin Geiß. The reviewer wrote that the book "is a thought-provoking contribution that takes a refreshingly broad and timely approach in addressing the legal, ethical, and strategic-political dimension of the contemporary debate over targeted killings". Geiß concluded, "There is some overlap between the chapters, their relationship is not always evident, and as much as the interdisciplinary approach of this volume is to be appreciated, assembling and interlinking the different legal, ethical, and political findings in an overarching, concluding chapter would have been particularly useful. Nevertheless, the book reflects the entire spectrum of diverging views on the matter, and adds an important impetus to move the current debate forward."

Assistant Professor and Head of Reference at Leonard Lief Library, Lehman College, City University of New York, Madeline E. Cohen wrote in an article for the International Journal of Legal Information, "Within the context of moral and legal principles, and military strategy, the subject of targeted killings is analyzed in great detail. These essays are interdisciplinary in their approach, and give various sides of arguments on this rich subject." She concluded, "An excellent introduction by Andrew Altman provides an overview of 'Our Asymmetric World' and models used to combat terrorism. References, tables of cases and legal instruments are included making this an excellent reference for further research."

Abraham David Sofaer reviewed the book for the Texas Law Review. Sofaer wrote, "It is a beautiful book: large, with print size that is easy on the eyes, and with sufficient space between lines of text to make the complex material at least visually digestible. It has useful tables of cases, instruments, legislation, and abbreviations, as well as an index." He commented, "it should be clear that a reader seeking a single, nonredundant and objective account of targeted killing should find another book. On the other hand, this collection of essays provides several original and useful treatments of various aspects of the subject." Sofaer said that the book could have given more weight to the law enforcement model of how and when to use deadly force against individuals.

The collection also received a review from University of Geneva postdoctoral research fellow in the faculty of law, Steven J. Barela, in the Journal of International Criminal Justice. Barela described the book as "a constructive work with a wide purview onto one of the most pressing and difficult policy questions of our time". He stated, "this volume provides a valuable entry point for investigating this kaleidoscope of legal and moral issues". Steven R. Ratner of the University of Michigan Law School reviewed the book for the American Journal of International Law, writing, "In light of the complexity of the legal and moral issues, Targeted Killings is a welcome addition to the academic literature. It aims to combine in one volume perspectives from legal experts, moral philosophers, and military planners." University of Reading law lecturer Robert P. Barnidge Jr. wrote in the Boston University International Law Journal, "Targeted Killings also provides some clarity as to the threshold between armed conflict and situations falling short of armed conflict". He concluded, "[the book's] main contribution to the discussion lies in its focus on the willing use of violence on a significant scale by an organized group".

== See also ==
- Assassination
- Chapter VII of the United Nations Charter
- CIA transnational anti-terrorism activities
- Extrajudicial killing
- Hague Initiative for Law and Armed Conflict
- Justifiable homicide
- Manhunt (military)
- Protocol I to the Geneva Conventions

Targeted killing

- Targeted killing
- Israeli targeted killings
- July and August 2011 Karachi target killings
- Targeted Killing in International Law
- Targeted killings in Pakistan
- Rise and Kill First: The Secret History of Israel's Targeted Assassinations
