= Hague Initiative for Law and Armed Conflict =

Dutch humanitarian law initiative

The Hague Initiative for Law and Armed Conflict is an initiative of the Netherlands Red Cross and the T.M.C. Asser Instituut. Its goal is to bring all actors in the field of International Humanitarian Law in the Netherlands together, and to disseminate International Humanitarian Law through different activities. Recently, HILAC has joined forces with the Amsterdam Center for International Law of the University of Amsterdam. The Hague Initiative for Law and Armed Conflict organizes a monthly lecture series, speakers in 2008 include:

- 16 September 2008 Nils Melzer - Direct Participation in Hostilities
- 7 October 2008 Liesbeth Zegveld - Remedies for War Victims
- 11 November 2008 Ove Bring - The Law on Neutrality and Collective Security: a Historical Perspective

== Past lectures ==
- 15 July 2008 Gary Solis, Georgetown University Law School - Removal of Protected Persons from Occupied Terr
- 17 June 2008 Prof. Tim McCormack Australian Red Cross Professor of International Humanitarian Law & Director of the Asia Pacific Centre for Military Law at the Melbourne Law School - Cluster Munitions, Proportionality and the Foreseeability of Civilian Damage
- 20 May 2008 Marten Zwanenburg Legal advisor to the Netherlands Ministry of Defense - Occupation under International Humanitarian Law,
- 6 May 2008 Major Chris de Cock Belgian Air Force - Current Challenges in Air and Missile Warfare
- 22 April 2008 Judge Theodor Meron International Criminal Tribunal for the former Yugoslavia - Does International Criminal Justice Work?
- 10 April 2008 Prof. Wolff Heintschel von Heinegg - Contemporary issues of naval warfare
- 18 March 2008 Liesbeth Lijnzaad Legal Adviser of the Dutch Ministry of Foreign Affairs - Gender and IHL
- 21 February 2008 Steven Freeland - The Application of the Rules of International Humanitarian Law to the Military Use of Outer Space
- 22 January 2008 Hans Boddens Hosang - Rules of Engagement and IHL
- 15 November 2007 Koen de Groof - Targeted killings under IHL
- 18 September 2007 Theo Boutruche University of Geneva - The Principle of Superfluous Injury and Unnecessary Suffering Basic Principles of IHL, Part IV
- 3 July 2007 Gabor Rona International Legal Director of Human Rights First - A bull in the china shop: the 'war on terror' and international law in the United States
- 19 June 2007 Judge Abdul Koroma, Judge at the International Court of Justice - The Application of the Fundamental Principles of IHL by the International Court of Justice
- 24 May 2007 Frits Kalshoven, Professor Emeritus of Leiden University - From the Martens Clause to Tadic Jurisdiction and beyond: custom and principle as sources of LOAC
