= Hussein Abayat =

Palestinian militant leader (died 2000)

Hussein Abayat (died 9 November 2000) was a senior commander in Tanzim, the paramilitary unit of Palestinian movement Fatah. At the beginning of the Second Intifada, the Israeli military killed Abayat outside Bethlehem, the first time that Israel publicly acknowledged conducting a targeted killing. Israel states that the targeted killing of Abayat was a response to attacks for which he was held responsible. It also stated that the operation was executed while he was en route to conduct another attack.

== Biography ==
Abayat was commander of the Tanzim paramilitary group active in violence against Israel at the beginning of the Second Intifada. Israeli officials said that Abayat was the "mastermind" of a "terrorist network" that was responsible for deadly attacks on Israeli soldiers and civilians, including seven between 6 October and 1 November 2000. Palestinians confirmed that Abayat was the local leader of the intifada in Beit Sahur, a Palestinian town on the outskirts of Bethlehem.

== Death ==
Early in the Second Intifada, the Israeli Shin Bet discovered that Abayat was behind shooting attacks on roads in the West Bank and in the Jerusalem neighborhood of Gilo. After the Ramallah lynching in October 2000, however, Israeli forces were hesitant to operate in Area A of the West Bank without large numbers of IDF soldiers. Israel concluded that the only way to target Abayat was via an undercover force of Shaldag Unit operatives and an air attack.

On 9 November 2000, approximately six weeks into the Second Intifada, an IDF helicopter fired anti-tank missiles at Abayat's truck traveling on a road in Beit Sahur, on the outskirts of Bethlehem. Abayat's assistant Khaled Salahat was severely wounded in the strike. According to Israeli General Yitzhak Eitan, at the time of the assassination Abayat was on his way to carry out another attack.

The Israeli operation against Abayat represented a shifting in Israeli targeting policy. Israel previously used helicopter-fired missile to target only empty buildings and other facilities associated with the Palestinian Authority, after issuing warning for individuals to evacuate. Abayat was the first Palestinian leader to die in a systematic Israeli campaign to kill senior Palestinian militants.

== Aftermath ==
The Israeli operation targeting Abayat occurred hours before Palestinian leader Yasir Arafat was to meet with U.S. President Bill Clinton in Washington.

Israeli deputy defense minister Efraim Sneh warned of additional missile attacks due to the nature of the guerrilla war with the Palestinians. Fatah officials vowed revenge, and Tanzim leader Marwan Barghouti warned of Palestinian reprisals.

In January 2001, an 18-year old Palestinian described as "simple-minded" was convicted in military trial and publicly executed by firing squad in Bethlehem for allegedly collaborating with Israel, leading to the operation against Abayat. Two other Palestinians were given prison terms of life.
