= Targeted Killing in International Law =

2008 Book by Nils Melzer

- Book cover
- Author: Nils Melzer
- Language: English
- Series: Oxford Monographs in International Law
- Subject: Targeted killing
- Genre: Warfare
- Publisher: Oxford University Press
- Publication date: 29 May 2008
- Publication place: United Kingdom
- Media type: Hardback
- Pages: 524
- ISBN: 978-0-19-953316-9
- OCLC: 489257770

Targeted Killing in International Law is a book about the legality of targeted killing, written by Nils Melzer. It was first published by Oxford University Press in May 2008. The book explores the history of targeted killing, as a government strategy by multiple countries including the United States, the United Kingdom, Israel, Switzerland and Germany; for both military and law enforcement purposes. Melzer argues that directly after the September 11 attacks in the United States, perceptions of the tactic became more positive.

Melzer holds a PhD degree in law from the University of Zürich. His dissertation dealt with targeted killing and the book updates and revises that work. He had earlier written on the subject for Yearbook of International Humanitarian Law in 2006. Melzer serves as a legal advisor for the International Committee of the Red Cross (ICRC). He has lectured at the Master-level at the Geneva Academy of International Humanitarian Law and Human Rights.

The book received a favorable reception and was a joint winner of the 2009 Paul Guggenheim Prize in International Law given by the Geneva Graduate Institute. It garnered positive reviews in publications including the International Criminal Justice Review, the European Journal of International Law, the Leiden Journal of International Law, the Australian Year Book of International Law, the American Journal of International Law, and in the book Legislating the War on Terror: An Agenda for Reform.

== Background ==
Nils Melzer graduated summa cum laude from the University of Zürich with a PhD degree in law. Melzer worked for the District Court of Meilen, Zürich, first as a Judicial Clerk and then as Judicial Secretary. Melzer serves as a legal advisor for the International Committee of the Red Cross (ICRC). He lectured at the Master-level at the Geneva Academy of International Humanitarian Law and Human Rights.

Prior to the book, Melzer published "Targeted Killing or Less Harmful Means? – Israel's High Court Judgment on Targeted Killing and the Restrictive Function of Military Necessity" in the Yearbook of International Humanitarian Law in 2006, and a dissertation in 2007. Melzer also authored "Interpretive Guidance on the Notion of Direct Participation in Hostilities under International Humanitarian Law", published in 2009 by ICRC. Melzer's research was utilized in Section IX of the ICRC's Interpretive Guidance on the Notion of Direct Participation in Hostilities under International Humanitarian Law.

Targeted Killing in International Law is part of the series, Oxford Monographs in International Law. The hardback was first published by Oxford University Press on 29 May 2008, and subsequently in the United States by Oxford University Press, USA in July 2008. In January 2009, the work was published online at Oxford Scholarship Online. On 10 September 2009, Oxford University Press released a paperback in the UK. Oxford University Press, USA released a paperback on 9 November 2009.

== Content summary ==
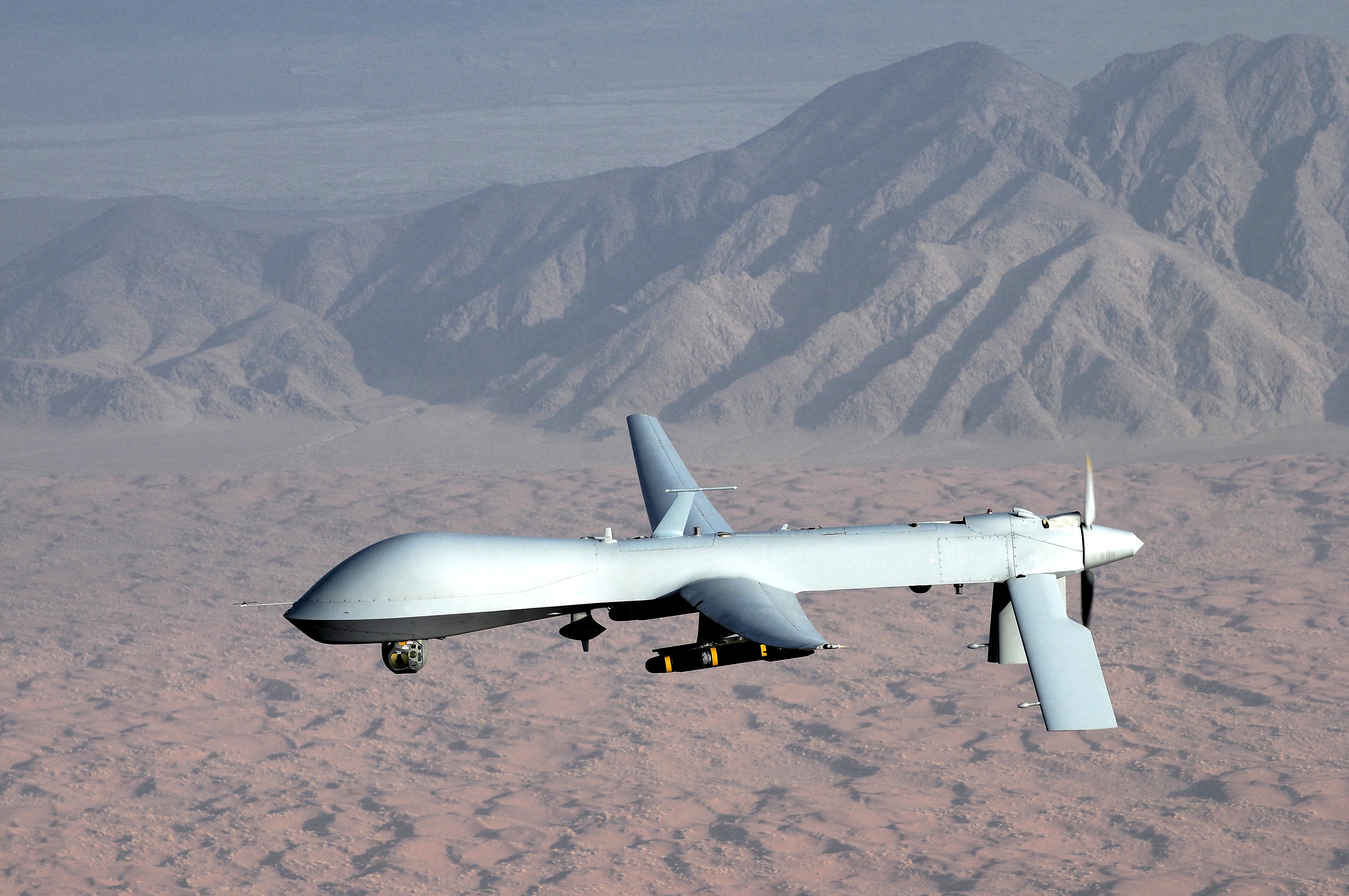
A Predator drone; used in targeted killings

Nils Melzer presents a historical, legal and moral examination of targeted killing. The author observes that after September 11, the Western world grew more supportive of targeted killing than ever before. The book recounts in depth how state-sanctioned targeted killing is perceived in other countries. He defines targeted killing as the premeditated selection of an individual person not yet in custody for elimination by force. Melzer analyzes all areas of the topic.

The book discusses related legal practices of countries including the United States, the United Kingdom, Israel, Switzerland and Germany. Israel was the first country to publicly acknowledge the practice—in November 2000. The author connects this policy initiative with Israel's ongoing conflict with Palestinian militants. Melzer argues that this policy was controversial—the issue came before the Israeli Supreme Court, where the matter was not decided for almost five years. The court's judgment was issued on 14 December 2006, but neither forbade nor endorsed the practice. Melzer asserts that it left multiple important legal conundrums unresolved. Its significance was that it dealt not with a single incident, but rather with the nature of the policy itself and set forth conditions for examining the legality of future episodes.

Melzer claims that during the Vietnam War the Central Intelligence Agency used targeted killings as part of the Phoenix Program, attempting to eliminate Vietcong sympathizers. Melzer cites a source who contends that some 40,000 individuals may have been killed under this program. The author sees the air raids on Muammar Gaddafi in the 1986 bombing of Libya in response to the Lockerbie bombing as another instance. He argues that after September 11, 2001, the policy became more acceptable in the U.S. to adopt targeted killings as a tactic.

According to Melzer, after the September 11 attacks, U.S. strategists began to support targeted killings and accepted advice from Israel on how to use such tactics to deal with suicide bombers. Melzer describes an abrupt change where military members were ordered to "shoot to kill", replacing prior orders to incapacitate. The author asserts that in at least one case in 2005, a person was killed because they were thought to be a terrorist holding a bomb. It was later revealed that this person suffered from mental illness and may have had a medical history of bipolar disorder. The shooting was determined to be justifiable under the law and criminal charges were not filed.

Melzer discusses the shift in perceptions towards acceptance by United Kingdom law enforcement after September 11. The Metropolitan Police officially endorsed a "shoot to kill" strategy directly after the attack. Melzer finds this policy shift incongruous, due to the fact that targeted killing had never before been acceptable as police strategy. Prior to the attack, targeted killing was a criminal offense.

== Reception ==
Targeted Killing in International Law was a joint-winner of the 2009 Paul Guggenheim Prize in International Law given by the Geneva Graduate Institute. In the chapter "Targeted Killing in U.S. Counterterrorism Strategy and Law" authored by Kenneth Anderson as a contributor to the book Legislating the War on Terror: An Agenda for Reform, he characterizes Melzer's book as an admirable opus on the subject. Anderson describes the book in more depth in a footnote, calling it a complete and thorough academic reference book. He goes on to criticize the perspective of the book for describing and then rejecting objections by the United States to arguments addressed in the work. Anderson writes that the book is both one scholars must have to educate themselves on the subject, while simultaneously lamenting its advocacy for U.S. legal positions. Anderson observes the author covers all facets of targeted killing in the book.

In a review of the book for the journal International Criminal Justice Review, Robert M. Worley of Penn State Altoona comments favorably on the comprehensive nature of Melzer's research and his descriptions of the differences of the practice of targeted killing in varying countries. Worley comments on the relevance of the book to scholars in various fields, including history, law, law enforcement, and terrorism analysis. Worley concludes his review by recommending the book for those with a fascination in researching criminal justice or the law. William Abresch comments favorably on Targeted Killing in International Law, in a review for the European Journal of International Law. He writes that the book is an important addition to the field of scholarship regarding how international law governs the practice of targeted killing. Abresch calls the author's writing style logical, and praises the book's organizational structure including its separate sections on use of targeted in war contrasted with use by police.

A review of the book in the Leiden Journal of International Law by Tamás Hoffmann recommends the work to multiple potential readers, including those who engage in targeting killing, academics, and students. Hoffmann calls it a well-researched monograph and helpful reference work on the subject. The review places the book within the context of addressing legal issues inherent in debating the murky concept of targeted killing. Hoffmann states the book furthers prior attempts to come to a resolution on the question of the practice's legality. Helen Durhan praises the writing quality of Melzer's work, in a review for the Australian Year Book of International Law. Durhan writes the work is organized in an easily readable format and covers the topic with neutrality. She goes on to call the book a work representing the need for concerned discussion prior to implementing any policy involved in eliminating people. Of the author's focus throughout the work, Durhan observes that the author handles discussion of the legality of targeted killing in a clear and precise manner. The review concludes Melzer's thorough analysis goes a long way towards furthering scholars' impressions of legal issues surrounding when it is permitted for sovereign governments to kill people.

Writing in a review for the American Journal of International Law, Michael N. Schmitt observes that the arguments put forth in the book by Melzer are indeed accurate. Schmitt writes that Melzer correctly argues that in the police model sequential events within the legal system lead to precedent for engaging in targeted killing. Schmitt describes the book as an excellent overview of many aspects of law regarding targeted killing. Schmitt concludes, "Targeted Killing in International Law is not just a major contribution to the legal literature, it has justifiably emerged as the premier work on the subject."

== See also ==
- CIA transnational anti-terrorism activities
- Extrajudicial killing
- Justifiable homicide
- Manhunt (military)
- Targeted Killings: Law and Morality in an Asymmetrical World
- Rise and Kill First: The Secret History of Israel's Targeted Assassinations
