= Targeted killing =

Extrajudicial assassination by governments

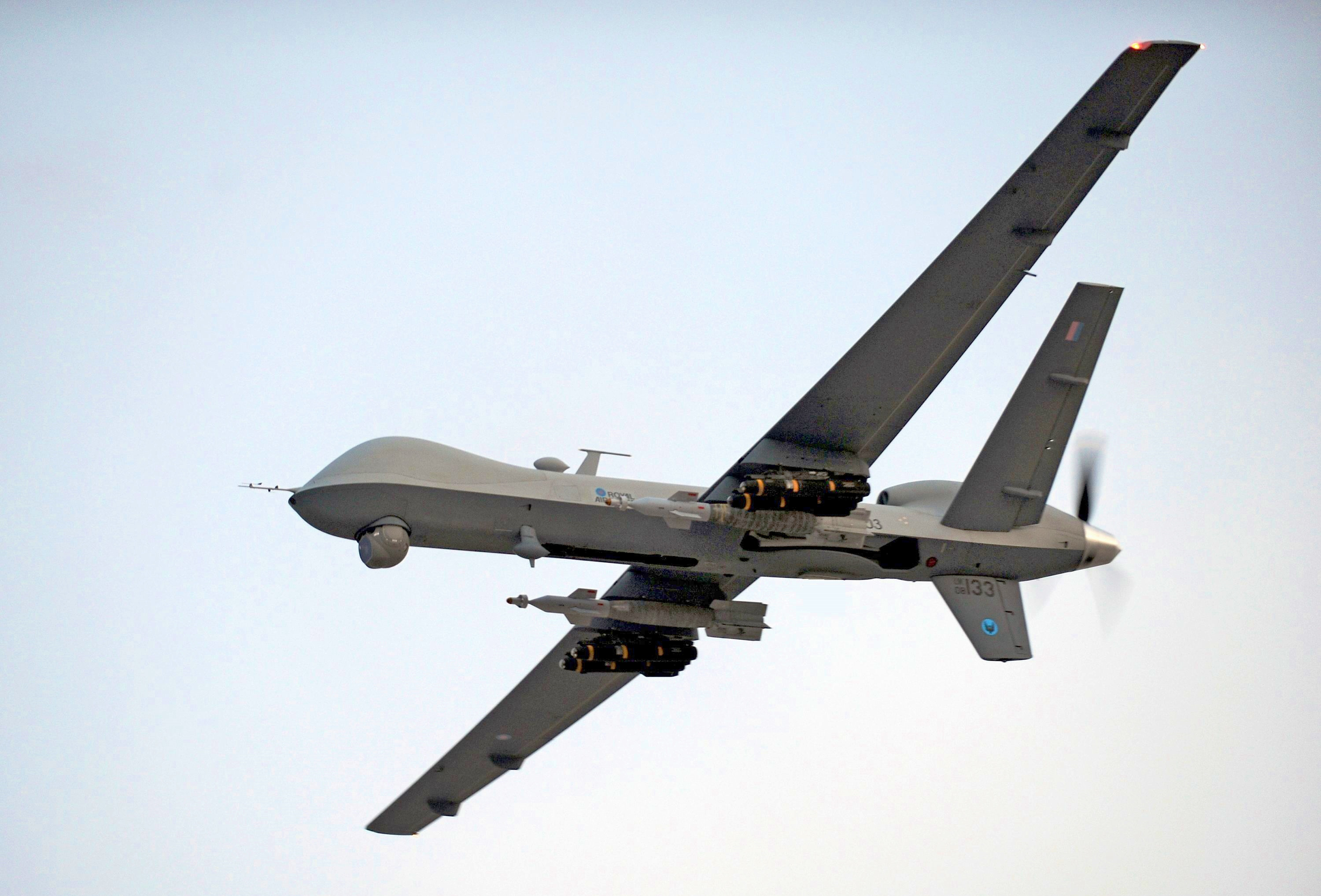
Modern targeted killings are frequently performed using unmanned combat aerial vehicles like the MQ-9 Reaper.

Targeted killing is a form of assassination carried out by governments outside a judicial procedure or a battlefield.

Since the late 20th century, the legal status of targeted killing has become a subject of contention within and between various nations. Historically, at least since the mid-eighteenth century, Western thinking has generally considered the use of assassination as a tool of statecraft to be illegal. Some academics, military personnel and officials describe targeted killing as legitimate within the context of self-defense, when employed against terrorists or combatants engaged in asymmetrical warfare. They argue that unmanned combat aerial vehicles (drones) are more humane and more accurate than manned vehicles.

Scholars are also divided as to whether targeted killings are an effective counterterrorism strategy.

The strategy has also been used by non-state actors and unrecognised states such as the Islamic State.

== Africa ==
=== Somalia and Rwanda, 1990s ===
During fighting in the Somali Civil War, Sean Devereux described torture and killing by warlords in Kismayo as "targeted killings, a kind of ethnic cleansing", shortly before his assassination.

Also in Africa, Reuters described "targeted killings of political opponents" by Hutu army and militias in Rwanda during the Rwandan genocide. The American State Department reported the "politically targeted killings" were a prelude to general massacres in Rwanda.

== Americas ==
During the 1980s and 1990s, targeted killings were employed extensively by death squads in El Salvador, Nicaragua, Colombia, and Haiti within the context of civil unrest and war.

Starting under the George W. Bush administration, targeted killings became a frequent tactic of the United States government in the war on terror. Instances of targeted killing by the United States that have received significant attention include the killing of Osama bin Laden in 2011 and the killing of Ayman al-Zawahiri in 2022, as well as those of American citizens Anwar al-Awlaki and his teenage son in 2011. Under the Obama administration, use of targeted killings expanded, most frequently through use of combat drones operating in Afghanistan, Pakistan or Yemen.

=== American and drug cartels, 1980s ===
Referring to killings by drug cartels in Washington, D.C. in 1989, mayor Marion Barry infamously stated, "Washington should not be called the murder capital of the world. We are the targeted-killing capital of the world." Barry said that "targeted killings" by D.C.'s cartels were comparable to those during the days of "Al Capone and Eliot Ness" at the time of Prohibition in the United States. Similarly, drug-related "mob hits" in Moscow during the 1990s were euphemistically described as "targeted killings" by the Cox News Service and Atlanta Journal-Constitution.

=== Central and South America ===
Operation Condor participants. active members (lighter green less active) collaborators

The U.S.-backed Operation Condor was a campaign of political repression and state terror in Latin American right-wing dictatorships involving assassination of political opponents and dissidents. The National Security Archive reported, "Prominent victims of Condor include two former Uruguayan legislators and a former Bolivian president, Juan José Torres, murdered in Buenos Aires, a former Chilean Minister of the Interior, Bernardo Leighton, as well as former Chilean ambassador Orlando Letelier and his 26-year-old American colleague, Ronni Moffitt, assassinated by a car bomb in downtown Washington D.C."

In 1986, the human rights group Americas Watch released a report stating that death squads and armed forces under President José Napoleón Duarte in El Salvador had carried out 240 targeted killings throughout 1985. The report relied upon figures provided by the Roman Catholic Church and included allegations of torture and summary executions. Americas Watch and other rights groups reported "targeted killing" of civilians by the Nicaraguan Sandinista government in the following year during its campaign against the Contras. Politically motivated targeted killings of trade unionists and activists were also recorded in Haiti and Colombia during the late 1980s and 1990s. Targeted killings linked to the drug trade and paramilitary organizations including FARC and the United Self-Defense Forces of Colombia (AUC) resulted in large numbers of deaths among human rights and political activists, and women and children, throughout the 1990s.

=== North America ===
==== Use by United States government ====
An early example of American targeted killing is Operation Vengeance during World War II. This counterattack shot down the plane of Isoroku Yamamoto, the senior planner of the attack on Pearl Harbor.

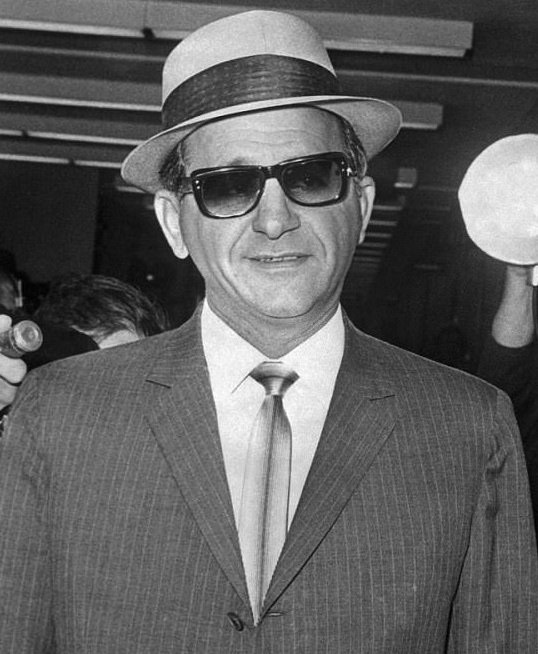
The CIA recruited Sam Giancana (pictured), Santo Trafficante and other mobsters to assassinate Fidel Castro.

During the Vietnam War, the Phoenix Program targeted political leadership of the Viet Cong for assassination.

During the period 1976–2001, there was an American norm against targeted killing.

The United States has made targeted killing—the deliberate assassination of a known terrorist outside the country's territory, usually by airstrike—an essential part of its counter-terrorism strategy. Hence, the United States has justified the killing of terrorists under a war paradigm. "Using the war paradigm for counter-terrorism enabled government lawyers to distinguish lethal attacks on terrorists from prohibited assassinations and justify them as lawful battlefield operations against enemy combatants, much like the uncontroversial targeted killing of Japanese Admiral Isoroku Yamamoto while he was traveling by a military airplane during World War II."

Further support for the U.S. government's use of drone strike tactics is found in a report found in the Journal of Strategic Security concerning the surgical nature of drone strikes for use in a populated area. The author concedes, "Indeed the tactic of using drones promises the ability of eliminating enemies in complex environments, while minimizing the political implications of resorting to war."

The domestic legislative basis offered to justify drone strikes is the Authorization for Use of Military Force Against Terrorists (AUMF), a joint resolution of both houses of Congress passed exactly one week after 11 September 2001. The AUMF permits the President to use "all necessary and appropriate force against those nations, organizations, or persons he determines planned, authorized, committed, or aided the terrorist attacks that occurred on 11 September 2001, or harbored such organizations or persons".

A report published in the Journal of Strategic Security focusing on the future of drones in geopolitics finds the U.S. government's use of drones in targeted killing operations an "indiscriminant and disproportionate use of force that violates the sovereignty of Pakistan".

Twenty-six members of United States Congress, with academics such as Gregory Johnsen and Charles Schmitz, media figures (Jeremy Scahill, Glenn Greenwald, James Traub), civil rights groups (i.e. the American Civil Liberties Union) and ex-CIA station chief in Islamabad, Robert Grenier, have criticized targeted killings as a form of extrajudicial killings, which may be illegal under both United States and international law.

In early 2010, with President Barack Obama's approval, Anwar al-Awlaki became the first U.S. citizen to be approved for targeted killing by the Central Intelligence Agency (CIA). Awlaki was killed in a drone strike in September 2011.

A Reuters report analysing the killing of 500 "militants" by US drones between 2008 and 2010 found that only 8% of those killed were mid- to top-tier organisers or leaders; the rest were unidentified foot soldiers.

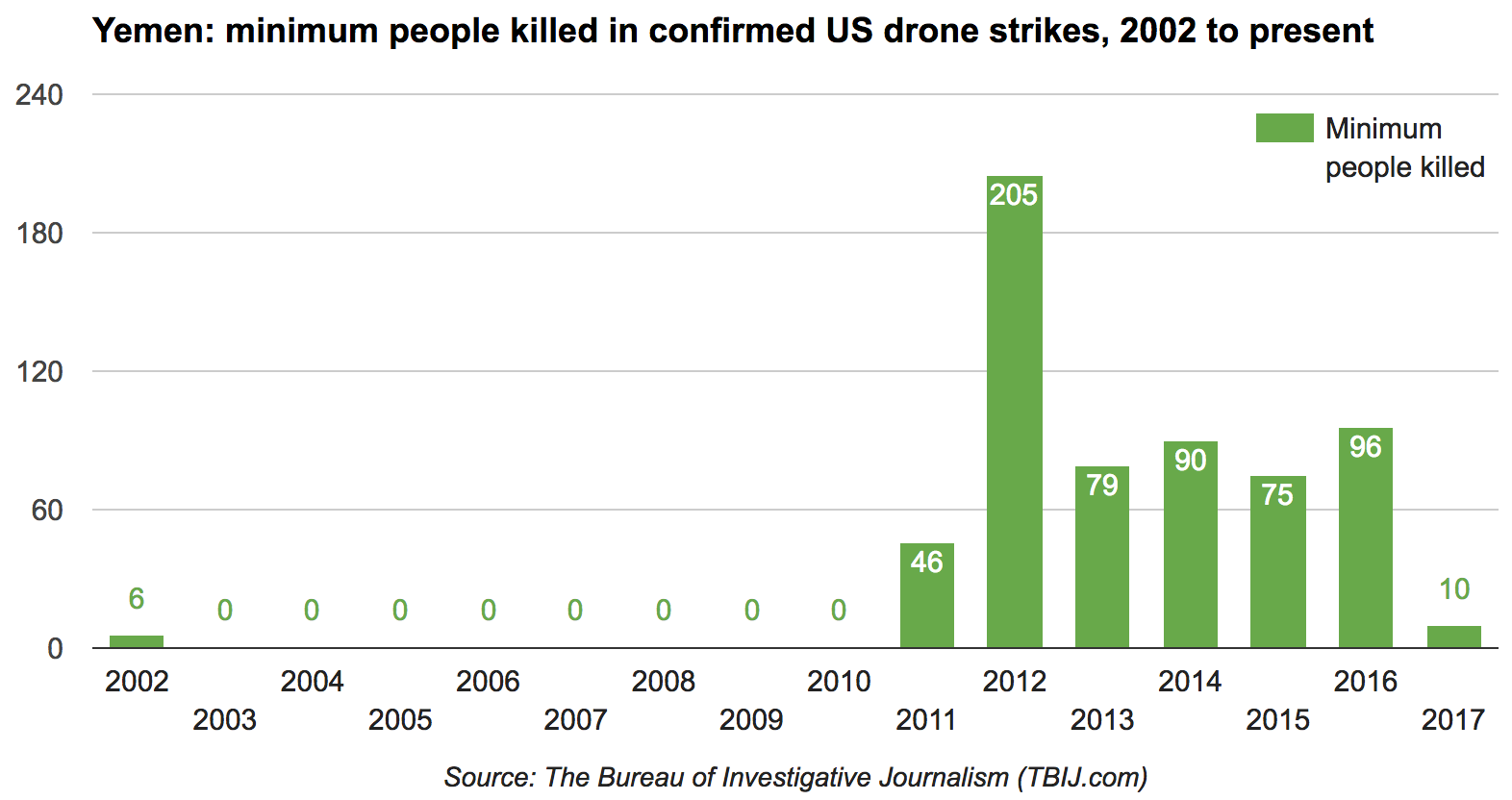
Graph of average casualties in drone strikes ordered by the United States in Yemen, 2002–2017

The Intercept reported, "Between January 2012 and February 2013, U.S. special operations airstrikes [in northeastern Afghanistan] killed more than 200 people. Of those, only 35 were the intended targets. During one five-month period of the operation, according to the documents, nearly 90 percent of the people killed in airstrikes were not the intended targets."

According to analysis by Reprieve, 874 people were killed, including 142 children, in drone strikes in Pakistan that targeted 24 people successfully and unsuccessfully, and, in numerous failed attempts to kill Ayman al-Zawahri, 76 children and 29 adults were killed.

Estimates for the total people killed in U.S. drone strikes in Pakistan, range from 2,000 to 3,500 militants killed and 158–965 civilians killed. 81 insurgent leaders in Pakistan have been killed. Drone strikes in Yemen are estimated to have killed 846–1,758 militants and 116–225 civilians. 57 Al-Qaeda in the Arabian Peninsula leaders are confirmed to have been killed.

==== Obama administration position on combat drones ====
The United States is in an armed conflict with al-Qa'ida, the Taliban, and associated forces, in response to the 9/11 attacks, and we may also use force consistent with our inherent right of national self-defense. There is nothing in international law that bans the use of remotely piloted aircraft for this purpose or that prohibits us from using lethal force against our enemies outside of an active battlefield, at least when the country involved consents or is unable or unwilling to take action against the threat.

— John O. Brennan in his 2012-04-30 speech "The Ethics and Efficacy of the President's Counterterrorism Strategy"

In a speech titled "The Ethics and Efficacy of the President's Counterterrorism Strategy" John O. Brennan, Assistant to the President for Homeland Security and Counterterrorism, outlined on 30 April 2012 at the Wilson Center the use of combat drones to kill members of al-Qaeda by the US Federal government under President Barack Obama. John Brennan acknowledged for the first time that the US government uses drones to kill selected members of al-Qaeda.

He justified the use of drones both from domestic law and international law point of view. With respect to domestic law Brennan stated, "as a matter of domestic law, the Constitution empowers the President to protect the nation from any imminent threat of attack. The Authorization for Use of Military Force (AUMF) passed by Congress after the 11 September attacks authorizes the president "to use all necessary and appropriate force" against those nations, organizations and individuals responsible for 9/11. There is nothing in the AUMF that restricts the use of military force against al-Qa'ida to Afghanistan." And he further said: "As a matter of international law, the United States is in an armed conflict with al-Qa'ida, the Taliban, and associated forces, in response to the 9/11 attacks, and we may also use force consistent with our inherent right of national self-defense. There is nothing in international law that bans the use of remotely piloted aircraft for this purpose or that prohibits us from using lethal force against our enemies outside of an active battlefield, at least when the country involved consents or is unable or unwilling to take action against the threat."

The speech came a few days after Obama authorized the CIA and the U.S. Joint Special Operations Command (JSOC) to fire on targets based solely on their intelligence "signatures"—patterns of behavior that are detected through signals intercepts, human sources and aerial surveillance, and that indicate the presence of an important operative or a plot against U.S. interests. Under the previous rules the CIA and the US military were only allowed to use drone strikes against known terrorist leaders whose location could be confirmed and who appeared on secret CIA and JSOC target lists.

The justification by Brennan built upon remarks by US top officials like the State Department's top lawyer Harold Hongju Koh, US Attorney General Eric Holder, the US Defense Department general counsel Jeh Johnson and President Obama himself, who defended the use of drones outside of so-called "hot battlefields" like Afghanistan.

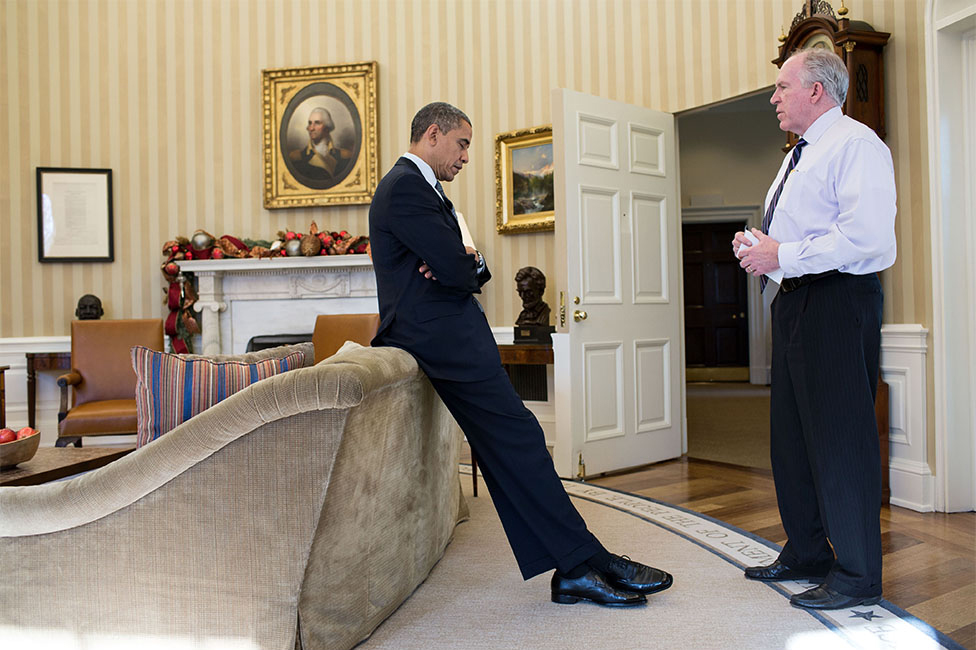
John O. Brennan, former director of the Central Intelligence Agency and chief counter-terrorism advisor to U.S. President Barack Obama

In 2011/2012, the process for selecting targets outside of warzones was altered so that power was concentrated in the hands of a group of people in the White House centered around White House counterterror chief John Brennan. Under the new plan, Brennan's staff compiles the potential target list and runs the names past agencies such as the State Department at a weekly White House meeting. According to The New York Times, President Obama has placed himself at the helm of a top secret process to designate terrorists for kill or capture, reserving the final say on approving lethal action, and signs off every strike in Yemen, Somalia and Pakistan.

U.S. congressional oversight over the targeted killing operations increased as the drone program intensified under the Obama administration. Once a month, a group of staff members from the House and Senate intelligence committees would watch videos of the latest drone strikes, review intelligence that was used to justify each drone strike, and sometimes examine telephone intercepts and after-the-fact evidence, such as the CIA's assessment of who was hit. The procedure used by House and Senate intelligence committees to monitor CIA drone strikes was set up largely at the request of Senator Dianne Feinstein who became determined to ensure that it was as precise as the CIA had been claiming. "That's been a concern of mine from the beginning," Feinstein said in little-noticed comments after the raid that killed Osama bin Laden in May 2011. "I asked that this effort be established. It has been. The way in which this is being done is very careful." Feinstein explained how the oversight works in general. "We receive notification with key details shortly after every strike, and we hold regular briefings and hearings on these operations," Feinstein wrote in May in a letter sent in response to a column that ran in the Los Angeles Times questioning the oversight of drone strikes. "Committee staff has held 28 monthly in-depth oversight meetings to review strike records and question every aspect of the program including legality, effectiveness, precision, foreign policy implications and the care taken to minimize noncombatant casualties." If the congressional committees objected to something, the lawmakers could call CIA leaders to testify in closed investigative hearings. If unsatisfied, they could pass legislation limiting the CIA's actions.

Congressional criticism of drone strikes has been rare. However, in June 2012, 26 lawmakers, all but two of them Democrats, signed a letter to Obama questioning so-called signature strikes, in which the U.S. attacks armed men who fit a pattern of behavior that suggests they are involved in terrorist activities. Signature strikes have been curbed in Pakistan, where they once were common, but in 2012 Obama gave the CIA permission to conduct them in Yemen, where an Al Qaeda affiliate that has targeted the United States has established a safe haven in the south. The lawmakers expressed concern that signature strikes could kill civilians. They added: "Our drone campaigns already have virtually no transparency, accountability or oversight."

While the Bush administration had put emphasis on killing significant members of al Qaeda, the use of combat drones underwent a quiet and unheralded shift during the Obama administration to focus increasingly on killing militant foot soldiers rather than high-value targets according to CNN National Security Analyst Peter Bergen. Bergen noted: "To the extent that the targets of drone attacks can be ascertained, under Bush, al Qaeda members accounted for 25% of all drone targets compared to 40% for Taliban targets. Under Obama, only 8% of targets were al Qaeda compared to just over 50% for Taliban targets."

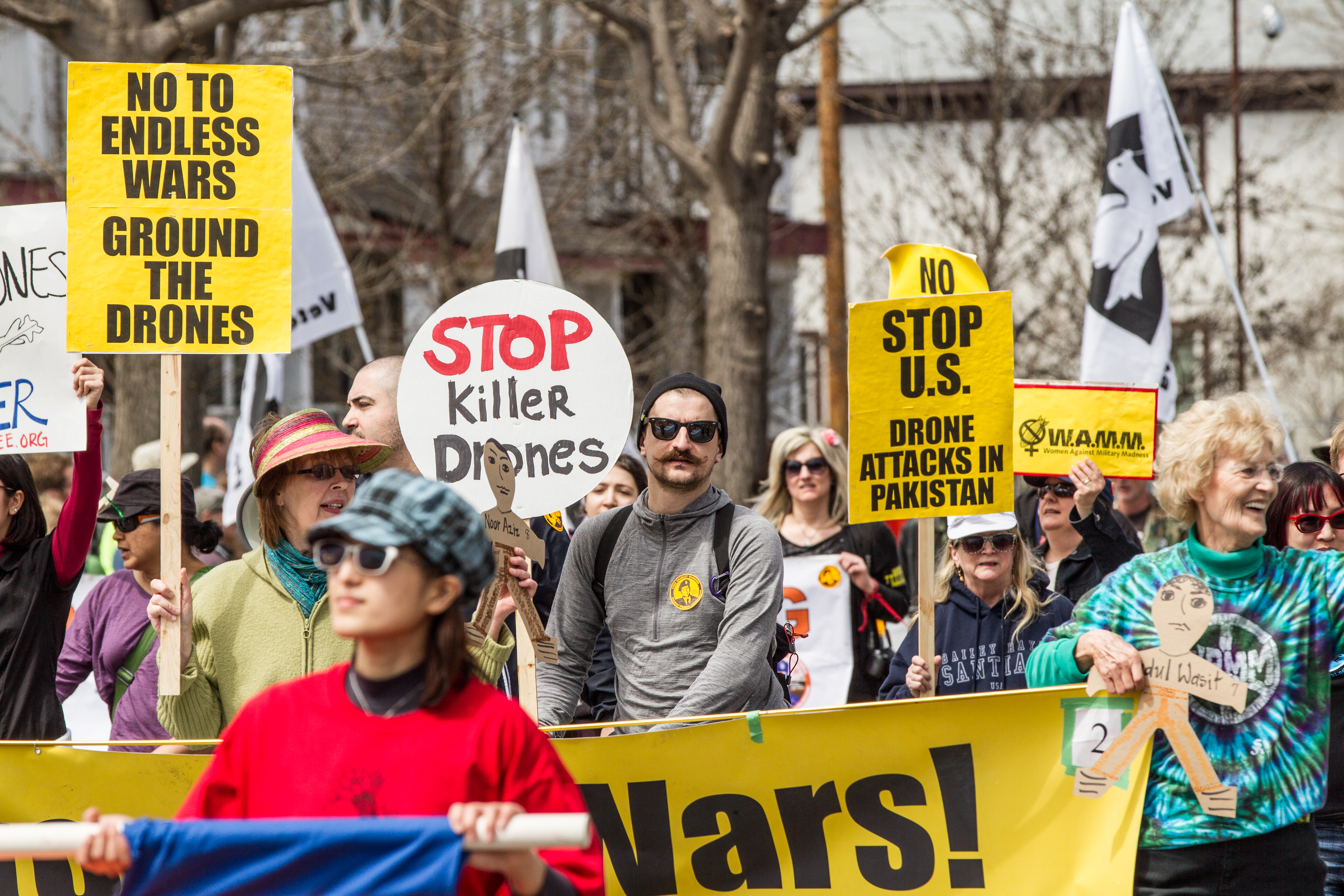
Minneapolis anti-war protest: 'Stop Killer Drones', 5 May 2013

Facing the possibility of defeat in the 2012 presidential election, the Obama administration accelerated work in the weeks before the election to develop explicit rules for the targeted killing of terrorists by unmanned drones, so that a new president would inherit clear standards and procedures. The work to codify U.S. drone policy began in summer 2011. "There was concern that the levers might no longer be in our hands," said one unnamed U.S. official. With a continuing debate about the proper limits of drone strikes, Obama did not want to leave an "amorphous" program to his successor, the official said. The effort, which would have been rushed to completion by January had Mitt Romney won, will now be finished at a more leisurely pace, the official said. "One of the things we've got to do is put a legal architecture in place, and we need Congressional help in order to do that, to make sure that not only am I reined in but any president's reined in terms of some of the decisions that we're making," Obama said and added "creating a legal structure, processes, with oversight checks on how we use unmanned weapons, is going to be a challenge for me and my successors for some time to come." U.S. President Obama also expressed wariness of the powerful temptation drones pose to policy makers. "There's a remoteness to it that makes it tempting to think that somehow we can, without any mess on our hands, solve vexing security problems," he said.

In response to lawsuits brought by The New York Times and the American Civil Liberties Union seeking to use the Freedom of Information Act to make public more details about the legal basis for the drone programs U.S. District Court Judge Colleen McMahon ruled at the end of December 2012 that the U.S. Government has no legal duty to disclose legal opinions justifying the use of drones to kill suspected terrorist operatives abroad. While noting that a more detailed disclosure of the administration's legal rationale "would allow for intelligent discussion and assessment of a tactic that (like torture before it) remains hotly debated", McMahon came to the conclusion that the Freedom of Information Act did not permit her to require such transparency.

In a letter dated 22 May 2013 to the chairman of the U.S. Senate Judiciary committee, Patrick J. Leahy, U.S. attorney general Eric Holder wrote that the United States will use lethal force by combat drones "in a foreign country against a U.S. citizen who is a senior operational leader of al Qa'ida or its associated forces, and who is actively engaged in planning to kill Americans, in the following circumstances: (1) the U.S. government has determined, after a thorough and careful review, that the individual poses an imminent threat of violent attack against the United States; (2) capture is not feasible; and (3) the operation would be conducted in a manner consistent with applicable law of war principles." In a Presidential Policy Guidance entitled "U.S. Policy Standards and Procedures for the Use of Force in Counterterrorism Operations Outside the United States and Areas of Active Hostilities" from May 2013 the United States government stated that lethal force by combat drones "will be used only to prevent or stop attacks against U.S. persons, and even then, only when capture is not feasible and no other reasonable alternatives exist to address the threat effectively". The U.S. government further declared, "lethal force will be used outside areas of active hostilities only when the following preconditions are met:

- First, there must be a legal basis for using lethal force.
- Second, the United States will use lethal force only against a target that poses a continuing, imminent threat to U.S. persons.
- Third, the following criteria must be met before lethal action may be taken:

1. Near certainty that the terrorist target is present;
2. Near certainty that non-combatants will not be injured or killed;
3. An assessment that capture is not feasible at the time of the operation;
4. An assessment that the relevant governmental authorities in the country where action is contemplated cannot or will not effectively address the threat to U.S. persons; and
5. An assessment that no other reasonable alternatives exist to effectively address the threat to U.S. persons.

U.S. President Barack Obama touched on the subject of combat drones in a speech on Counterterrorism delivered on 23 May 2013 at the National Defense University. "It is a hard fact that US strikes have resulted in civilian casualties," he said, adding, "These deaths will haunt us. But as commander-in-chief I must weigh these heartbreaking tragedies against the alternative. To do nothing in the face of terrorist networks would invite far more civilian casualties." Obama said new guidance allowed targeting only those terrorists posing "a continuing and imminent threat to the American people", which administration officials said meant only individuals planning attacks on the U.S. homeland or against U.S. persons abroad. Obama defended the use of drones as just because America "is at war with al Qaeda, the Taliban and their associated forces". To stop terrorists from gaining a foothold, drones will be deployed according to Obama, but only when there is an imminent threat; no hope of capturing the targeted terrorist; "near certainty" that civilians won't be harmed; and "there are no other governments capable of effectively addressing the threat". Never will a strike be punitive.

A report by Ben Emmerson QC, the UN's special rapporteur on human rights and counter-terrorism, who identified 33 drone strikes around the world that have resulted in civilian casualties and may have violated international humanitarian law urged the United States "to further clarify its position on the legal and factual issues ... to declassify, to the maximum extent possible, information relevant to its lethal extraterritorial counter-terrorism operations; and to release its own data on the level of civilian casualties inflicted through the use of remotely piloted aircraft, together with information on the evaluation methodology used". Human Rights Watch said that in Yemen more civilians were killed than admitted by the Obama administration, while Amnesty International said the same of drone strikes in Pakistan. Caitlin Hayden, a White House spokeswoman, declined to comment on the reports, but said in an e-mail statement: "As the President emphasized, the use of lethal force, including from remotely piloted aircraft, commands the highest level of attention and care."

While the U.S. government is considering whether to kill an American abroad suspected of planning terrorist attacks and how to do so legally under new stricter targeting policy issued in 2013, The Intercept reported that the U.S. government is using primarily NSA surveillance to target people for drone strikes overseas. In its report The Intercept the author details the flawed methods which are used to locate targets for lethal drone strikes, resulting in the deaths of innocent people. According to The Washington Post, NSA analysts and collectors (i.e. NSA personnel who control electronic surveillance equipment) use the NSA's sophisticated surveillance capabilities to track individual targets geographically and in real time, while drones and tactical units aim their weaponry against those targets to take them out.

NBC News released in February 2014 an undated Department of Justice White paper entitled "Lawfulness of a Lethal Operation Directed Against a U.S. Citizen who is a Senior Operational Leader of Al Qa'ida or An Associated Force" in which the Obama administration concludes that the U.S. government can order the killing of American citizens if they are believed to be "senior operational leaders" of al-Qaida or "an associated force"—even if there is no intelligence indicating they are engaged in an active plot to attack the U.S. However any such targeted killing operation by the United States would have to comply with the four fundamental law-of-war principles governing the use of force which are necessity, distinction, proportionality and humanity – i.e., the avoidance of unnecessary suffering. (Page 8 of). The memo also discusses why targeted killings would not be a war crime or violate a U.S. executive order banning assassinations:

"A lawful killing in self-defense is not an assassination. In the Department's view, a lethal operation conducted against a U.S. citizen whose conduct poses an imminent threat of violent attack against the United States would be a legitimate act of national self-defense that would not violate the assassination ban. Similarly, the use of lethal force, consistent with the laws of war, against an individual who is a legitimate military target would be lawful and would not violate the assassination ban."

In 2013, a report on drone warfare and aerial sovereignty proposed that U.S. government drone policy in Pakistan potentially violated human rights according to the U.N. International Covenant on Civil and Political Rights. The rights in direct question were the right to life; right to a fair trial; the freedom of association; right to protection of the family; and, less directly, right to highest attainable health standards; right to education; and right of freedom from hunger.

On 21 April 2014, the United States Court of Appeals for the Second Circuit overturned the above-mentioned December 2012 ruling by U.S. District Judge Colleen McMahon and ruled that the Obama administration must release documents justifying its drone-killings of Americans and foreigners. The 2nd U.S. Circuit Court of Appeal released on 23 June 2014 a July 2010 memo by then U.S. Justice Department's Office of Legal Counsel David Barron which outlined the rationale for killing the American Citizen Anwar al-Aulaqi.

==== Trump administration position on combat drones ====
CIA-ordered drone strikes were eventually ended by President Obama, who transferred control entirely to the U.S. military, under a separate legal authority. President Trump reversed this decision in 2017. A 2016 Obama executive order requiring an annual report of civilian deaths from US airstrikes outside combat zones was not complied with by the Trump administration for 2017 and was then revoked by an executive order in 2019. According to the BBC, citing the Bureau of Investigative Journalism, a UK-based non-profit news organisation, there were 2,243 drone strikes in the first two years of the Trump presidency, compared with 1,878 in Obama's eight years in office. According to press reports, the Trump administration has at times employed a missile that deploys blades rather than explosives to kill targets, because it hoped to decrease non-combatant casualties. The missile is believed to have seen its first combat action in the 2017 killing of Abu Khayr al-Masri.

== Asia ==
=== Use by the Iranian government ===
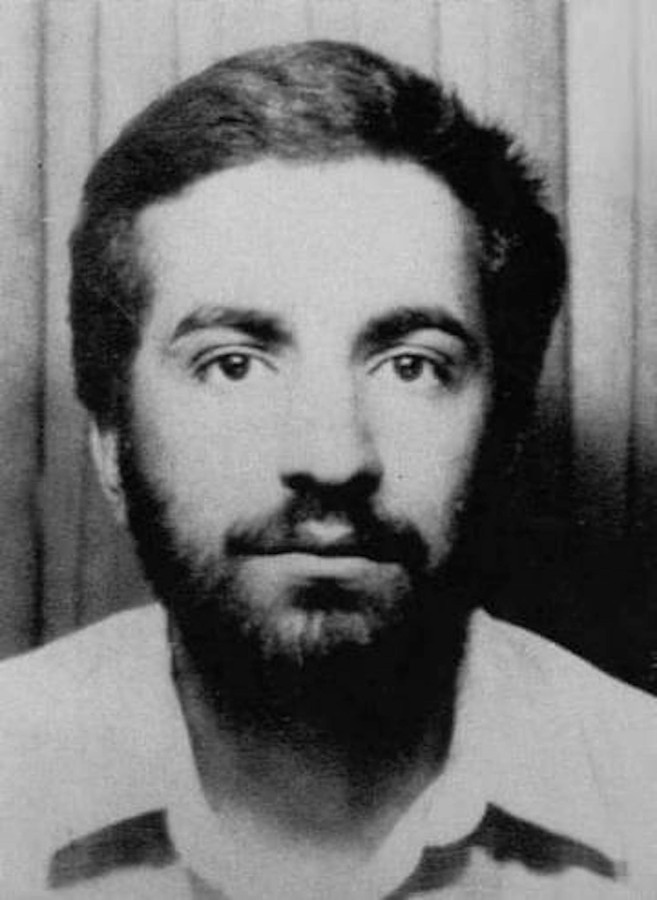
Mohammad-Reza Kolahi was assassinated in the Netherlands in 2015.

Alleged and confirmed assassinations were reported to have been conducted by the Islamic Republic of Iran and previously by the Pahlavi regime. It includes attempts on notable persons who were reported to have been specifically targeted by the various Iranian security and intelligence forces, most notably against Kurdish dissidents of the Kurdish Democratic Party of Iran in the 1980s and 1990s. Prior to the establishment of the Islamic State in 1979, the Organization of Intelligence and National Security also allegedly performed a number of political motivated assassinations against dissidents and opposition leaders.

=== Use by Israel ===
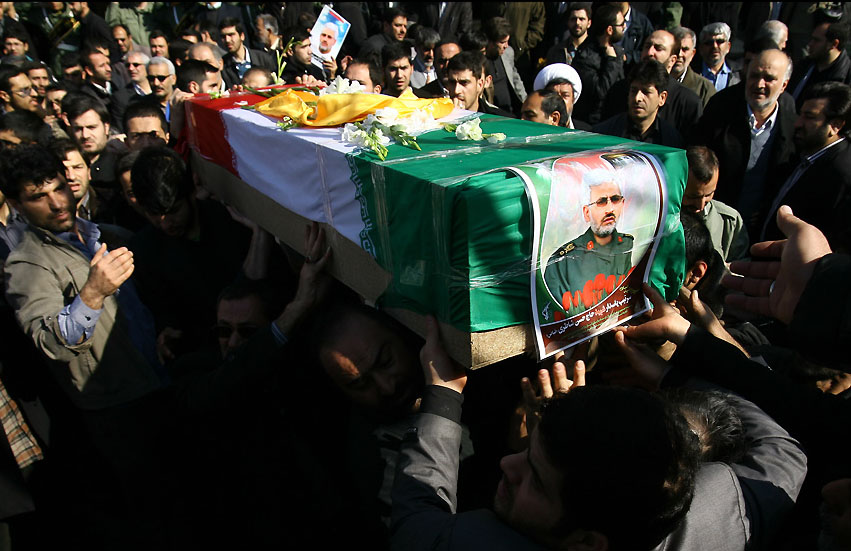
Funeral of Iranian Major General Hassan Shateri, who was assassinated in Syria in February 2013

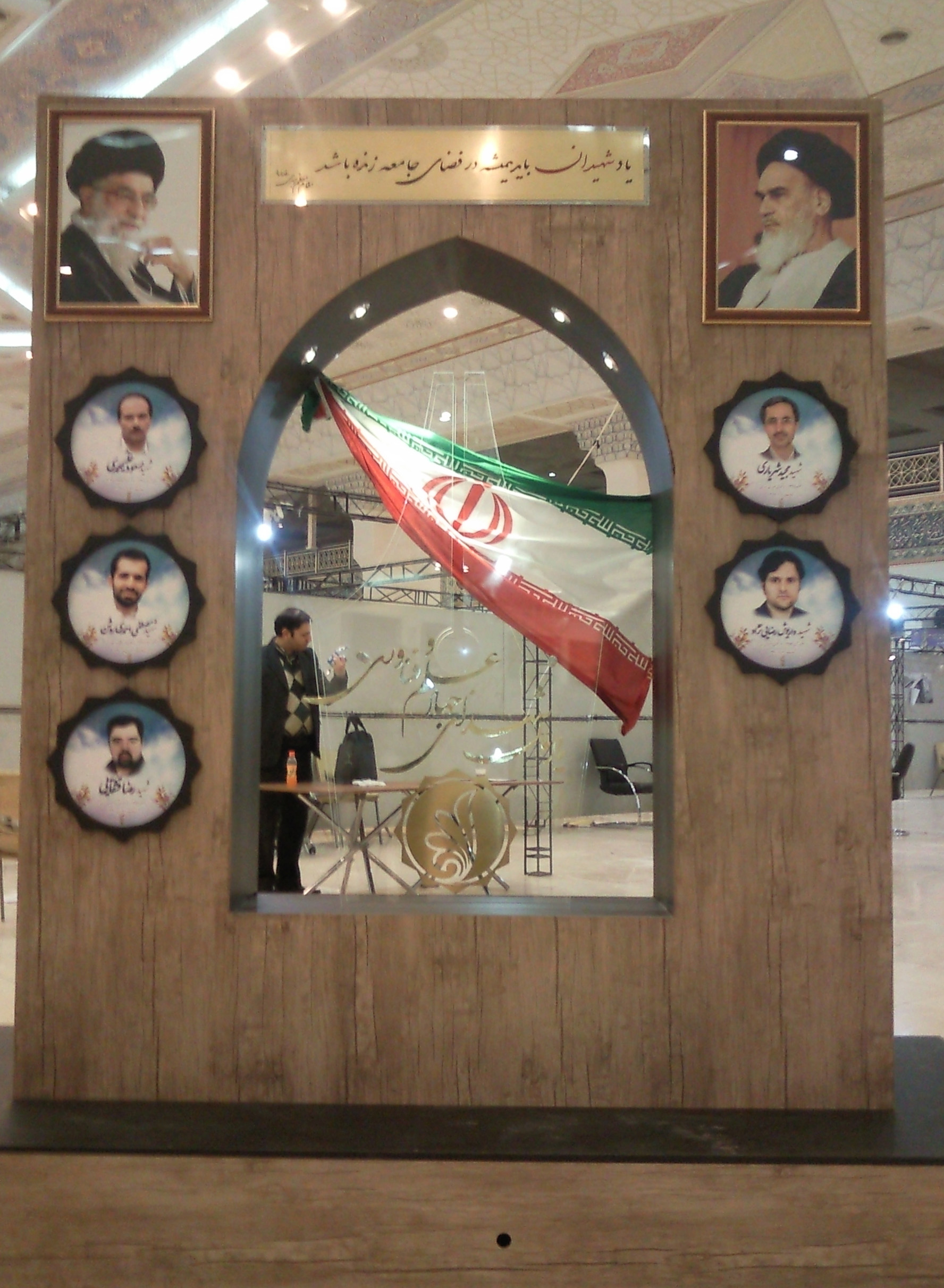
Memorial to the assassinated Iranian scientists.

According to Ronen Bergman, "since World War II, Israel has used assassination and targeted-killing more than any other country in the West, in many cases endangering the lives of civilians".

During the First Intifada Palestinian uprising, the Palestinian human-rights group Al Haq condemned Israeli soldiers for what they described as "deliberate, cold-blooded... targeted" killings of Palestinians in the West Bank and Gaza Strip. In 1993, the human rights group, Middle East Watch, alleged that Israeli soldiers had targeted often unarmed Palestinians, some under the age of 16, for "premeditated assassinations" or targeted killing, a charge denied by Israeli officials. The allegations included the execution of Palestinians in custody.

Controversy over targeted killings continued during the Second Intifada. Palestinians stated that individuals belonging to the group Hamas and shot in targeted killings were being assassinated. Israelis stated that those killed were responsible for attacks against Israelis. Israeli officials initially accepted responsibility for only some of the killings, and Israeli media termed the practice a "liquidations policy", whereas Palestinians called it "state terrorism". In January 2001, Israeli officials confirmed "the practice of targeted assassinations". Conflict in Israel over the legality of the practice centered on the case of Dr. Thabet Thabet, assassinated as he left his home on New Year's Eve. Dr. Thabet was alleged by the Israeli military to be a senior local leader of Fatah and plotting attacks against Israelis in the West Bank. A dentist, Dr. Thabet was a friend of many Israeli peace activists and considered one himself. Israeli activists called the killing "a crime", "Mafia-style", and "immoral". Ephraim Sneh, then Israel's Deputy Prime Minister, described the policy as "effective, precise and just".

The Washington Post wrote that the Israeli policy of targeted killing during the Second Intifada expanded upon previous policies, targeting not only terrorists but also those thought to direct or coordinate them. Another controversial killing, which occurred following the George W. Bush administration's condemnation of the practice, was that of Mahmoud Madani, a leader of Hamas shot while leaving a mosque in the Balata refugee camp. The Israeli military suspected Madani of plotting bombings in Israel.

At that time, spokesman for the U.S. State Department Richard Boucher condemned both violence by Palestinians and targeted killings by Israelis during a State Department news briefing. U.S. Secretary of State Colin Powell registered his opposition to "a policy of targeted killings" and the U.S. State Department urged Israel to stop them.

Then Democratic Party senator Joe Biden criticized the George W. Bush administration for condemning the targeted killings. The administration continued to oppose them.

Use of targeted killings by Israeli conventional military forces became commonplace after the Second Intifada, when Israeli security forces used the tactic to kill Palestinian militants.

The book Rise and Kill First: The Secret History of Israel's Targeted Assassinations describes the targeted killings carried out by Israeli secret agencies and the personalities and the tactics used. The book's title is inspired by the Talmud: "If someone comes to kill you, rise up and kill him first" (Hebrew: הבא להורגך השכם להורגו). Based on a thousand interviews and thousands of documents, the book is the story of many political and intelligence figures such as agents of Mossad, Shin Bet, and the Israeli military, some of them speaking under their real identity. Ehud Barak and Ehud Olmert, former Israeli prime ministers, and Meir Dagan, a recent head of Mossad for eight years, were among those interviewed. The book was awarded the 2018 National Jewish Book Award in the History category.

=== Use by Islamic State ===
The strategy has also been used by non-state actors and unrecognised states such as the so-called Islamic State.

=== Use by the North Korean government ===
On 13 February 2017, Kim Jong-nam died after being exposed to VX nerve agent at Kuala Lumpur International Airport in Malaysia. It is widely believed that he was killed on the orders of his half-brother Kim Jong Un. Four North Korean suspects left the airport shortly after the attack, traveling back to Pyongyang.

An Indonesian woman, Siti Aisyah, and a Vietnamese woman, Đoàn Thị Hương, were charged with murder but said they thought they were taking part in a TV prank. In March 2019, Siti Aisyah was freed after the charge against her was dropped. In April, the murder charge against Hương was also dropped, and she pleaded guilty to the lesser charge of "voluntarily causing hurt by dangerous weapons or means". She was sentenced to three years and four months in prison, but received a one-third reduction in her term, and was released on 3 May 2019.

=== Use in the Philippines ===
In the Philippines, since Rodrigo Duterte assumption of the presidency in 2016, police and vigilantes have targeted drug related criminal suspects, with many cases, some involving children, thought to be the result of police extrajudicial executions. The group Human Rights Watch has described these extrajudicial killings as "targeted killings".

=== Use by Saudi Arabia ===
The Tiger Squad (Arabic: فرقة النمر, Firqat el-Nemr), also known as UNIT 1103, and officially called the Rapid Intervention Force (Arabic: قوة التدخل السريع, Quat al-Tadakhul al-Sarie), is a military unit under the Crown Prince of Saudi Arabia, Mohammed bin Salman. According to an unnamed source interviewed by the London-based online news outlet Middle East Eye following the assassination of Jamal Khashoggi in October 2018 and a BBC source inside Saudi Arabia who has a relative in the squad, it is a Saudi team that consists of approximately one-hundred fifty Saudi officers. According to the Middle East Eye source, the Tiger Squad is a death squad of members from the military and intelligence agencies that has the mandate to carry out covert operations and executions, killing Saudi dissidents inside Saudi Arabia and abroad in a way that "goes unnoticed by the media, the international community". Sa'ad Al-Faqih, a Saudi opposition leader who claims he knows about this squad, confirmed that the role of the squad was to target and kill Saudi opponents.

On 2 October 2018, Jamal Khashoggi, a Saudi dissident journalist, was killed by agents of the Saudi government at the Saudi consulate in Istanbul, Turkey. Khashoggi was ambushed and strangled by a 15-member squad of Saudi operatives. His body was dismembered and disposed of in some way that was never publicly revealed.

=== Alleged use in Syria ===
In 2016, Syrian President Bashar al-Assad showed British politician David Davis a spreadsheet containing the identities of 783 people who were being targeted for assassination by the Syrian government.

== Europe ==
=== In Bosnia and Serbia ===
Referring to human rights abuses during the Bosnian War, the U.S. State Department noted politically or ethnically motivated "targeted killings" in Bosnia in Section 1a., "Political and Other Extrajudicial Killing", of its 1993 report on human rights practices in Bosnia and Herzegovina. Targeted killings were also reported by Serbian and Albanian forces during the Kosovo War. Both wars involved large scale targeted killings of journalists.

=== Use by the Russian government ===
During the First Chechen War, Chechen President Dzhokhar Dudayev was killed on 21 April 1996 by two laser-guided missiles when he was using a satellite phone, after his location was detected by a Russian reconnaissance aircraft, which intercepted his phone call.

On 20 March 2002, Ibn al-Khattab, who led his militia against Russian forces in Chechnya during the First and Second Chechen War, setting up many effective ambushes against Russian forces as well as managing the influx of foreign fighters and money, was killed when a Dagestani messenger hired by the Russian Federal Security Service (FSB) gave Khattab a poisoned letter. Chechen sources said that the letter was coated with "a fast-acting nerve agent, possibly sarin or a derivative".

On 13 February 2004, Zelimkhan Yandarbiyev, who served as acting president of the breakaway Chechen Republic of Ichkeria between 1996 and 1997, was killed when a bomb ripped through his SUV in the Qatari capital, Doha. Yandarbiyev was seriously wounded and died in hospital. His 13-year-old son Daud was seriously injured. The day after the attack, Qatari authorities arrested three Russians in a Russian embassy villa. One of them, the first secretary of the Russian Embassy in Qatar, Aleksandr Fetisov, was released in March due to his diplomatic status and the remaining two, the GRU agents Anatoly Yablochkov (also known as Belashkov) and Vasily Pugachyov (sometimes misspelled as Bogachyov), were charged with the assassination of Yandarbiyev, an assassination attempt of his son Daud Yandarbiyev, and smuggling weapons into Qatar. There were some speculations that Fetisov had been released in exchange for Qatari wrestlers detained in Moscow. On 30 June 2004, both Russians were sentenced to life imprisonment; passing the sentence, the judge stated that they had acted on orders from the Russian leadership. But on 23 December 2004, Qatar agreed to extradite the prisoners to Russia, where they would serve out their life sentences. The agents however received a heroes' welcome on returning to Moscow in January 2005 but disappeared from public view shortly afterwards. The Russian prison authorities admitted in February 2005 that they were not in jail, but said that a sentence handed down in Qatar was "irrelevant" in Russia.

On 10 July 2006 Shamil Basayev, a Chechen militant leader who was alleged to be responsible for numerous guerrilla attacks on security forces in and around Chechnya and the 2002 Moscow theater hostage crisis and described by ABC News as "one of the most-wanted terrorists in the world", was killed by an explosion near the border of North Ossetia in the village of Ali-Yurt, Ingushetia, a republic bordering Chechnya. According to the official version of Basayev's death, the FSB, following him with a drone, spotted his car approaching a truck laden with explosives that the FSB had prepared, and by remote control triggered a detonator in the explosives.

Alexander Litvinenko was poisoned with polonium, which the European Court of Human Rights ruled Russia was responsible for.

US and UK intelligence agents reportedly say they believe Russian assassins and possibly the Russian government could have been behind at least fourteen targeted killings on British soil, which were dismissed as non-suspicious by UK police.

Ukrainian authorities have blamed Russian security services for multiple killings in Ukraine, including assassination of Colonel Maksym Shapoval. During the Russian invasion of Ukraine, reports of Russian soldiers carrying a “kill list” have surfaced.

The Russian government is alleged by the British government of being behind a failed assassination attempt on Sergei Skripal and his daughter using a Novichok agent.

=== Use by Ukraine ===
Since the beginning of the 2022 Russian invasion of Ukraine, close to 20 Russian-appointed officials and Ukrainian collaborators have been killed or injured in targeted killings. Ukrainian hit squads and saboteurs have gunned down, blown up, hanged and poisoned people who were regarded as collaborators of the puppet governments of Donetsk and Luhansk people's republics. On 30 August 2022, Meduza reported that nearly a dozen people had been killed and others injured in assassination attempts and provided information on every attack recorded by the media in the occupied territories. Some of the attacks were carried out by Ukrainian partisans who are led and trained by Ukrainian special forces.

On 27 September 2022, the OHCHR documented six killings of suspected "traitors" of Ukraine. The victims were officials of local authorities, policemen and civilians who were believed to have voluntarily cooperated with the enemy. According to OHCHR, these killings may have been committed by government agents or with their acquiescence and may amount to extrajudicial executions and war crimes.

== Legality ==
While article 2(4) of the United Nations Charter prohibits the threat or use of force by one state against another, two exceptions are relevant to the question of whether targeted killings are lawful: (1) when the use of force is carried out with the consent of the host state; and (2) when the use of force is in self-defense in response to an armed attack or an imminent threat, and where the host state is unwilling or unable to take appropriate action. The legality of a targeted drone strike must be evaluated in accordance with international humanitarian law (IHL), including the fundamental principles of distinction, proportionality, humanity, and military necessity.

The part of The Charter of the United Nations that regulates "action with respect to threats to the peace, breaches of the peace, and acts of aggression" is Chapter VII (articles 39–50), which requires that it is the Security Council that determines any threat to peace and decides on measures to be taken to maintain or restore peace. Article 51 mentions the only exception, as being members of the United Nations have "the inherent right of individual or collective self-defence if an armed attack occurs against a Member of the United Nations, until the Security Council has taken measures necessary to maintain international peace and security". Targeted killing operations, according to Harvard Law School professors Gabriella Blum and Philip Heymann, amplify the tension between addressing terrorism as a crime versus addressing terrorism as an act of war. Governments pursuing a law enforcement strategy punish persons for their individual guilt, which must be proven in a court of law, where the accused enjoys the protections of due process guarantees. Governments in the midst of war, on the other hand, may claim a legal obligation to take advantage of the relaxation of peacetime constraints on the use of deadly force. Enemy combatants may be targeted and killed not because they are guilty, but because they are potentially lethal agents of a hostile party. No advance warning is necessary, no attempt to arrest or capture is required, and no effort to minimize casualties among enemy forces is demanded by law. The tactic raises complex questions as to the legal basis for its application, who qualifies as an appropriate "hit list" target, and what circumstances must exist before the tactic may be employed. Opinions range from people considering it a legal form of self-defense that reduces terrorism, to people calling it an extrajudicial killing that lacks due process, and which leads to more violence. Methods used have included firing a Hellfire missile from an AH-64 Apache attack helicopter (Israel), or a Predator or Reaper drone (an unmanned, remote-controlled plane), detonating a cell phone bomb, and long-range sniper shooting. Countries such as the U.S. (in Pakistan and Yemen) and Israel (in the West Bank and Gaza) have used targeted killing to kill members of groups such as Al-Qaeda and Hamas.

=== Legal justifications for targeted killing ===
The U.S. Army's Law of Land Warfare (Field Manual 27–10) states:

31. Assassination and Outlawry

It is especially forbidden * * * to kill or wound treacherously individuals belonging to the hostile nation or army. [Article 23(b) of the 1907 Hague Regulations]

This article is construed as prohibiting assassination, proscription, or outlawry of an enemy, or putting a price upon an enemy's head, as well as offering a reward for an enemy "dead or alive". It does not, however, preclude attacks on individual soldiers or officers of the enemy whether in the zone of hostilities, occupied territory, or elsewhere.

Daniel Reisner, who headed the International Legal Division of the Israeli Military Advocate General's Office from 1994 to 2005, has stated that although targeted killing is illegal under previous understanding of international law, "If you do something for long enough, the world will accept it. The whole of international law is now based on the notion that an act that is forbidden today becomes permissible if executed by enough countries." Reisner continues, "International law progresses through violations. We invented the targeted assassination thesis and we had to push it. At first there were protrusions that made it hard to insert easily into the legal moulds. Eight years later it is in the center of the bounds of legitimacy." This view is disputed by George Bisharat of the University of California's Hastings College of the Law, who contends that assassination is not widely regarded as legal.

Georgetown Law Professor and former U.S. Marine, Gary Solis, has argued that under certain conditions, "Assassinations and targeted killings are very different acts." For Solis, these conditions require that there is an ongoing military conflict, the targeted individual (civilian or military) has taken up arms, that there is no reasonable possibility of arrest, and that the decision to kill is made by senior political leaders.

Abraham Sofaer, a former legal advisor to the U.S. State Department and fellow at the conservative Hoover Institution think tank, has written that targeted killing is "sometimes necessary, because leaders are obliged to defend their citizens". After the killing of Hamas founder and quadriplegic Ahmed Yassin by Israeli helicopter gunships, Sofaer argued that targeted killing is not prohibited by American Executive Order 11905 banning assassination: "killings in self-defense are no more 'assassinations' in international affairs than they are murders when undertaken by our police forces against domestic killers."

Previously, Sofaer had argued during the First Gulf War that targeted killing was ethical but impractical: "Targeted killing will also invite revenge against the leaders who order it as well as their citizens and property. Given the legal, political and moral constraints that limit such activities in democratic regimes, the United States has a substantial interest in discouraging acceptance of the killing of political leaders as a routine measure, even in self-defense."

Author and former U.S. Army Captain Matthew J. Morgan has argued, "there is a major difference between assassination and targeted killing.... targeted killing [is] not synonymous with assassination. Assassination ... constitutes an illegal killing." Amos Guiora, formerly an Israel Defense Forces Lt. Colonol and commander of the IDF school of military law, now Professor of law at the University of Utah, has written, "targeted killing is ... not an assassination". Steve David, Johns Hopkins Associate Dean & Professor of International Relations, writes: "there are strong reasons to believe that the Israeli policy of targeted killing is not the same as assassination." Syracuse Law Professor William Banks and GW Law Professor Peter Raven-Hansen write: "Targeted killing of terrorists is ... not unlawful and would not constitute assassination." Rory Miller writes: "Targeted killing ... is not 'assassination'", and associate professor Eric Patterson and Teresa Casale write: "Perhaps most important is the legal distinction between targeted killing and assassination."

American defense department analyst and professor Thomas Hunter has defined targeted killing as the "premeditated, preemptive, and intentional killing of an individual or individuals known or believed to represent a present or future threat to the safety and security of a state through the affiliation with terrorist groups or individuals. Hunter writes that the target is a person who is allegedly taking part in an armed conflict or terrorism, whether by bearing arms or otherwise, who has allegedly lost the immunity from being targeted that he would otherwise have under the Third Geneva Convention. Hunter distinguishes between "targeted killing" and "targeted violence" as used by specialists who study violence.

In response to the terrorist attacks on 9/11, the Authorization for Use of Military Force (AUMF) stated on 14 September 2001, "That the President is authorized to use all necessary and appropriate force against those nations, organizations or persons he determines planned, authorized, harbored, committed, or aided in the planning or commission of the attacks against the United States that occurred on 11 September 2001, and to deter and pre-empt any future acts of terrorism or aggression against the United States". This authorization is still in effect today. There are no restrictions regarding the physical location of where this law is applied. It only states that the President has the "authority to use all necessary and appropriate force" this could be interpreted to mean that the President can attack al-Qaeda anywhere in the world.

=== Legal opposition ===
During the 1998 bombing of Iraq, The Scotsman reported, "US law prohibits the targeted killing of foreign leaders... Administration officials have been careful to say they will not expressly aim to kill Saddam."

Political scientists Frank Sauer and Niklas Schörnig have described targeted killing as a violation of international law and a contravention of domestic laws, and maintain that the term itself is merely a legitimized euphemism for assassination.

The American Civil Liberties Union maintains that, "A program of targeted killing far from any battlefield, without charge or trial, violates the constitutional guarantee of due process. It also violates international law, under which lethal force may be used outside armed conflict zones only as a last resort to prevent imminent threats, when non-lethal means are not available. Targeting people who are suspected of terrorism for execution, far from any war zone, turns the whole world into a battlefield."

Yael Stein, the research director of B'Tselem, The Israeli Information Center for Human Rights in the Occupied Territories, also states in her 2003 article "By Any Name Illegal and Immoral: Response to 'Israel's Policy of Targeted Killing'":

The argument that this policy affords the public a sense of revenge and retribution could serve to justify acts both illegal and immoral. Clearly, lawbreakers ought to be punished. Yet, no matter how horrific their deeds, as the targeting of Israeli civilians indeed is, they should be punished according to the law. [Steven R.] David's arguments could, in principle, justify the abolition of formal legal systems altogether.

In 2001, Ibrahim Nafie criticized the U.S. for agreeing with "the Israeli spin that calls ... its official policy of assassinating Palestinian leaders 'targeted killing'."

In 2013, United Nations Special Rapporteur on human rights and counter terrorism, Ben Emmerson, stated that U.S. drone strikes may have violated international humanitarian law.

=== Additional concerns ===
For drone strikes to be effective, the United States must obtain consent from the host country they are operating in. The growing chorus of objections from host countries, most notably emanating from Pakistan, seriously inhibits drones' effectiveness. "Host states have grown frustrated with U.S. drone policy, while opposition by non-host partners could impose additional restrictions on the use of drones. Reforming U.S. drone strike policies can do much to allay concerns internationally by ensuring that targeted killings are defensible under international legal regimes that the United States itself helped establish and by allowing U.S. officials to openly address concerns and counter misinformation." Micah Zenko at the Council on Foreign Relations believes the United States should "end so-called signature strikes, which target unidentified militants based on their behavior patterns and personal networks, and limit targeted killings to a small number of specific terrorists with transnational ambitions. He wants more congressional oversight of drone strikes and stricter regulation on armed drone sales. Finally, he recommends the United States work with international partners to establish rules and norms governing the use of drones. Zenko believes the U.S. government has not been transparent regarding how non-battlefield drone strikes are reconciled with broader foreign policy objectives, the scope of legitimate targets, and their legal framework. While drones may be a critical counterterrorism tool that advances U.S. interests, their "lack of transparency threatens to limit U.S. freedom of action and risks proliferation of armed drone technology without the requisite normative framework." Zenko thinks current drone policy might share the same fate of the Bush-era enhanced interrogation techniques and warrantless wiretapping, both of which were unpopular, illegal and ultimately ended.

Harvard Law School Professors Gabriella Blum and Philip Heymann cite six potential hazards of targeted killings: First, the so-called Hydra effect, or the rise of more—and more resolute—leaders to replace those who were recently "decapitated." Second, drones can drive terrorist leaders into hiding, making the monitoring of their movements, and subsequent intelligence gathering, extremely difficult. Third, "the political message flowing from the use of targeted killings may be harmful to the attacking country's interest, as it emphasizes the disparity in power between the parties and reinforces popular support for the terrorists, who are seen as a David fighting Goliath." Fourth, when conducted in a foreign country, drone strikes run the risk of heightening tensions between the targeting government and the government in whose territory the operation is conducted. Fifth, targeted killings threaten criticism from local domestic constituencies against the government allowing strikes within their country. Finally, there is a danger of over-using targeted killings, both within and outside the war of terrorism. Max Abrahms finds that "more than the quantity of violence, decapitation reduces its quality," as leadership vacuums in militant groups are filled by less competent younger members with fewer inhibitions on harming civilians, and that this effect is most pronounced in the immediate aftermath of a successful decapitation strike.

Daniel Byman, security studies professor at Georgetown University, argues that Washington must clarify its policies behind extrajudicial and extraterritorial killings, lest a nefarious precedent in international law is set. Additionally, Byman argues that Washington must "remain mindful of the built-in limits of low-cost, unmanned interventions, since the very convenience of drone warfare risks dragging the United States into conflicts it could otherwise avoid." Though Byman recognizes the problems inherent in using armed UAVs, he believes that they are very effective. "U.S. drones have killed an estimated 3,000 al Qaeda, Taliban, and other jihadist operatives in Pakistan and Yemen. That number includes over 50 senior leaders of al Qaeda and the Taliban—top figures who are not easily replaced." Drones have also undercut terrorists' ability to effectively communicate with its target audiences, ultimately straining their recruitment pools. To avoid attracting drones, al Qaeda operates have avoided gathering in large numbers and mitigated use of electronic devices. Byman argues that al Qaeda leaders "cannot give orders when they are incommunicado, and training on a large scale is nearly impossible when a drone strike could wipe out an entire coupe of new recruits. Drones have turned al Qaeda's command and training structures into a liability, forcing the group to choose between having no leaders and risking dead leaders."

Audrey Kurth Cronin of George Mason University argues that while drones are tactically savvy, they have failed to advance the strategic goals of U.S. counter-terrorism policy. Terrorism itself is a tactic, Cronin notes, but it succeeds on a strategic plane when a shocking event is successfully leveraged for political gain. "To be effective, counter-terrorism must itself respond with a coherent strategy. The problem for Washington today is that its drone program has taken on a life of its own, to the point where tactics are driving strategy rather than the other way around." Cronin agrees with Daniel Byman of Georgetown University insofar that drones have inflicted real damage upon al Qaeda. However, "Washington now finds itself in a permanent battle with amorphous and geographically dispersed foe, one with an increasingly marginal connection to the original 9/11 plotters. In this endless contest, the United States risks multiplying its enemies and heightening their incentives to attack the country."

== See also ==
- Assassination
- Chapter VII of the United Nations Charter
- Drone (2014 film)
- Executive Order 12036
- Executive Order 12333
- High-value target
- International counter-terrorism activities of the CIA
- Justifiable homicide
- Kill authorizations
- Killing Hope
- Manhunt (law enforcement)
- Manhunt (military)
- Proscription
- Protocol I to the Geneva Conventions
- Targeted Killing in International Law
- Targeted Killings: Law and Morality in an Asymmetrical World
