= Gary D. Solis =

- Born: Gary Dean Solis; June 5, 1941 (age 85); Denver, Colorado, U.S.
- Education: San Diego State University; UC Davis School of Law; George Washington University; London School of Economics
- Occupation: Adjunct Professor of Law
- Employer: Georgetown University Law Center
- Known for: Expert in the laws of war
- Notable work: The Law of Armed Conflict: International Humanitarian Law in War (Cambridge University Press 2010)

Gary Dean Solis (born June 5, 1941) is a veteran of the U.S. Marine Corps and an adjunct professor of law who teaches the laws of war at the Georgetown University Law Center and the George Washington University Law School.

He attended San Diego State University (B.A), the University of California, Davis School of Law (J.D.), George Washington University Law School (LL.M.), and the London School of Economics and Political Science (Ph.D.). His doctoral thesis, in 1992, was on American military justice and the law of war: A case study of military law in Vietnam.

Before his academic career, Solis served two tours of duty during the Vietnam War in the United States Marine Corps. He is a former military judge advocate and Marine prosecutor, who retired as a lieutenant colonel (O-5).

Solis authored Marines and Military Law in Vietnam, as well as ones about war-crimes including the Son Thang massacre in Son Thang: An American War Crime and The Law of Armed Conflict: International Humanitarian Law in War (Cambridge University Press 2010).

Solis was the recurrent expert studio commentator during the Sky News (UK) daily coverage of the O.J. Simpson murder trial in 1994 and 1995.
