= Nils Melzer =

Swiss legal scholar and author

Nils Joachim Melzer (born 1970) is a Swiss academic, author, and practitioner in the field of international law. From 2016 until 2022, Melzer was the United Nations Special Rapporteur on Torture and Other Cruel, Inhuman or Degrading Treatment or Punishment. He is a professor of international law at the University of Glasgow. From 2011-2013, he was Swiss Chair of International Humanitarian Law at the Geneva Academy of International Humanitarian Law and Human Rights. Melzer has criticised the governments of the U.S., the U.K., Ecuador and Sweden over their treatment of Julian Assange.

== Education and career ==
Melzer was graduated summa cum laude from the University of Zürich with a Ph.D. degree in law.

Melzer served for 12 years with the International Committee of the Red Cross (ICRC) as delegate, deputy head of delegation, and legal adviser in conflict areas. After leaving the ICRC Melzer held academic positions as research director of the Swiss Competence Centre on Human Rights (University of Zürich), as senior fellow and senior advisor on Emerging Security Challenges (Geneva Centre for Security Policy) and at the Geneva Academy of International Humanitarian Law and Human Rights. He has served as Senior Adviser for Security Policy at the Political Directorate of the Swiss Federal Department of Foreign Affairs.

Melzer's books include Targeted Killing in International Law (Oxford University Press, 2008) as well as the Interpretive Guidance on the Notion of Direct Participation in Hostilities (ICRC, 2009) and the ICRC handbook, International Humanitarian Law - a Comprehensive Introduction (ICRC, 2016). He co-authored the NATO CCDCOE Tallinn Manual on the International Law applicable to Cyber Warfare (Cambridge, 2013), and of the NATO MCDC Policy Guidance: Autonomy in Defence Systems, (NATO ACT, 2014).

== United Nations Special Rapporteur ==
=== Assessment of Julian Assange's confinement ===
Julian Assange's lawyers contacted Melzer twice and sent him a medical assessment by Sondra Crosby. Melzer visited Assange in prison on 9 May 2019, accompanied by two medical experts specialised in examining potential victims of torture and other means of ill-treatment, to assess the conditions in which he was held. On 31 May, Melzer described the treatment Assange had received from the United States, United Kingdom, Sweden, and Ecuador as psychological torture and the U.S. indictments as the "criminalisation of investigative journalism".

In November 2019 Melzer criticised the UK government for placing Assange's life at risk by ignoring previous warnings about the state of his health. He said Assange "continues to be detained under oppressive conditions of isolation and surveillance, not justified by his detention status". He also said that Assange's access to legal counsel and documents were being severely obstructed, preventing him from preparing a defence against "the world's most powerful government". Melzer asked the UK government to stop Assange's extradition to the US, release him and allow him to "recover his health and rebuild his personal and professional life".

More than 300 human rights lawyers and law professors criticized Melzer's approach to "allegations of sexual assault" in an open letter. While considering the "overarching argument" may merit attention, they wrote that they were "deeply disturbed by the way he approaches the allegations of sexual assault in this case". On the issue of sexual violence, they wrote that Melzer's intervention was "both legally erroneous and harmful to the development and protection of human rights law." Melzer stood by his statement that the evidence collected in Sweden was not a basis for investigating the suspected rape and expressed hope that it would not divert attention away from the problems in the case of Assange. The three initiators of the open letter welcomed Melzer's clarification.

The Swedish prosecutor announced that the investigation had been dropped as of 19 November 2019.

One of the women interviewed by Melzer later criticised him and demanded his resignation. She said that by defining how a "proper rape-victim" would have to act, Melzer was engaging in victim blaming and that his report was partially "untrue and defamatory".

In a January 2020 interview, Melzer said he had never seen a comparable case where a person was subjected to nine years of a preliminary investigation for rape without charges being filed. He said Assange's lawyers made more than 30 offers to arrange for Assange to visit Sweden in exchange for a guarantee that he would not be extradited to the U.S. and described such diplomatic assurances as routine international practice. Melzer made various criticisms of the Swedish prosecutors, including for changing one of the women's statements without her involvement in order to make it sound like a possible rape. Melzer said that the Swedish rape investigation was an abuse of process aimed at pushing Assange into a position from which he was unable to defend himself. Melzer sent an official letter to Sweden listing fifty indications that there had been serious procedural violations in its treatment of Assange.

In a 2021 interview, Melzer said Assange's case showed "how fragile the rule of law is in the western world. ... Whether you like or hate Julian, if we allow telling the truth about government misconduct to become a crime, the powerful will be left completely unchallenged".

=== The Trial of Julian Assange: a Story of Persecution ===
Melzer's book, The Trial of Julian Assange: a Story of Persecution was published by Verso Books in February 2022. It recounts his investigation of Assange's case. In the book, Melzer wrote that Assange's treatment "exposes a fundamental systemic failure that severely undermines the integrity of our democratic, rule-of-law institutions.". Matthias von Hein wrote that the book "raises strong doubts about the strength of our justice system in the face of powerful interests that manipulate and abuse it". In relation to the Swedish investigation, von Hein wrote that "Melzer meticulously describes how the Swedish judiciary portrayed Julian Assange as a rapist for years, without giving him the chance to respond".

== Honours and awards ==
- Melzer's legal study called Targeted Killing in International Law was a joint-winner of the 2009 Paul Guggenheim Prize in International Law, awarded by the Geneva Graduate Institute.

== Published works ==
Selected publications

- Targeted Killing in International Law (Oxford University Press, 2008).
- Interpretive Guidance on the Notion of Direct Participation in Hostilities under International Humanitarian Law (Geneva: ICRC, 2009).
- Cyberwarfare and International Law (Geneva: UNIDIR, 2011)
- With Hans-Peter Gasser: Humanitäres Völkerrecht – Eine Einführung, 2nd ed. (Zürich: Schulthess, 2012).
- With Michael N. Schmitt (ed.) et al., Tallinn Manual on the International Law Applicable to Cyber Warfare (Cambridge: University Press, 2013).
- International Humanitarian Law - a Comprehensive Introduction (Geneva: ICRC, 2016).
- Der Fall Julian Assange - Geschichte einer Verfolgung. 336pp. (München: Piper Verlag, 2021).
- The Trial of Julian Assange: A Story of Persecution. Verso Books. 8 February 2022. ISBN 978-1-83976-625-1.

== Bibliography ==
- Glass, Charles (5 January 2024). "A fresh look at Julian Assange and WikiLeaks". TLS. - A review of The trial of Julian Assange
