= Politics of Karachi =

Overview of the political system of Karachi, Pakistan

Politics of Karachi کراچی کی سیاست
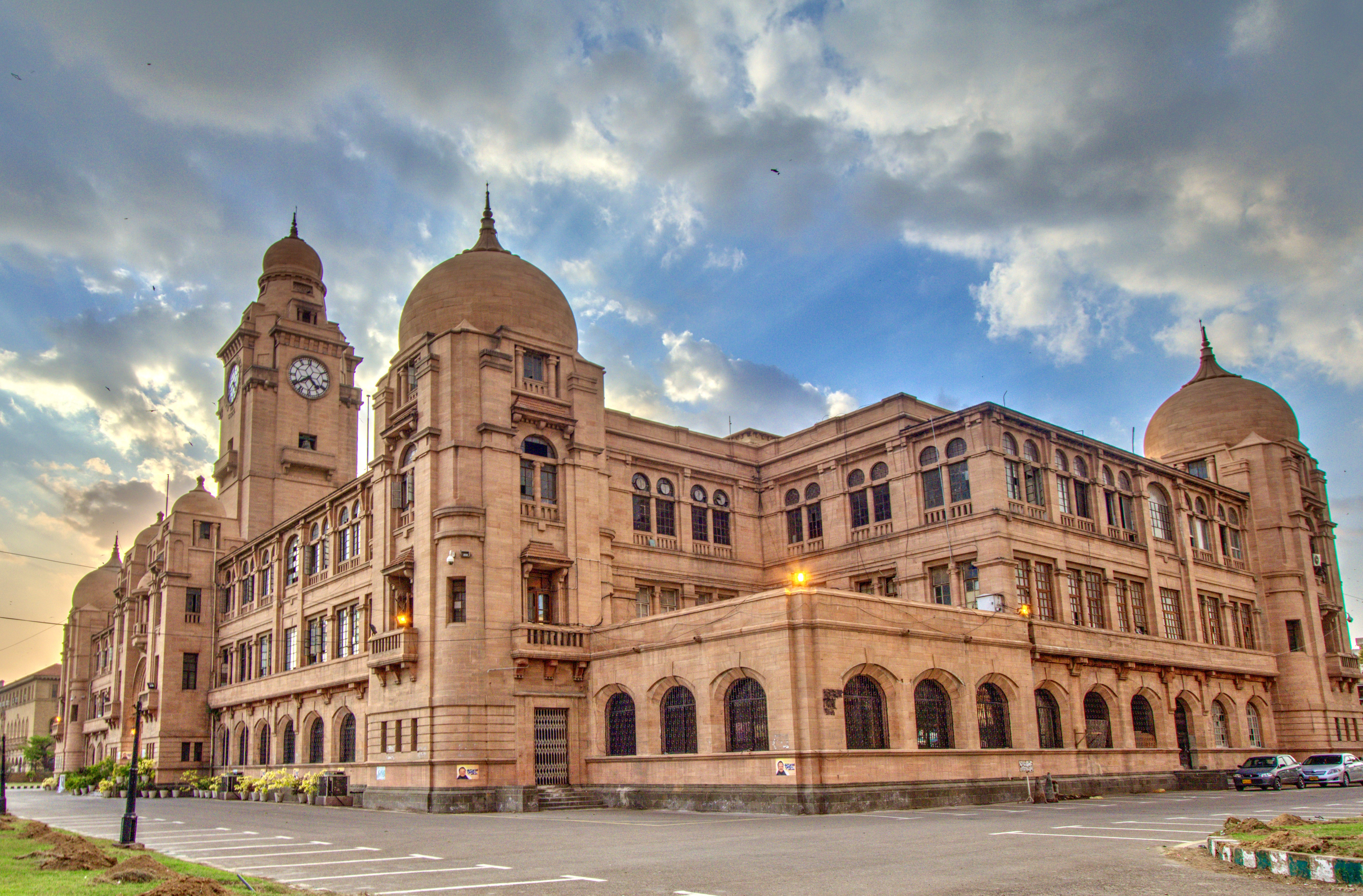
- Karachi Metropolitan Corporation Building

Executive branch
- Head of government
- Title: Mayor of Karachi
- Currently: Murtaza Wahab
- Appointer: City Council

Judicial branch
- Sindh High Court
- Chief judge: Ahmed Ali Sheikh
- Seat: Sindh High Court Building

The Politics of Karachi (Urdu: کراچی کی سیاست) takes place at the municipal, provincial and federal levels of the government. Karachi is a multiethnic, multilingual, multicultural and multireligious metropolitan city. The demographics of Karachi are important as most politics in Karachi is driven by ethnic politics.

At a national level, Karachi is also the capital of the province of Sindh, hosting the Provincial Assembly of Sindh and where the political seat of the Government of Sindh is centered.

== Municipal politics ==
The 2001 Local Government Ordinance provided for the devolution of government to district administrations. Naimatullah Khan was elected as the first Nazim (mayor) of Karachi in 2001 after the devolution plan. He is known to be the person behind many development projects in karachi including new roads, flyovers, underpasses, bridges and some educational institutes such as the KMDC. A Karachi circular railway was also planned under khan's supervision tough this project was never completed. Syed Mustafa Kamal was elected as the second Nazim of Karachi in 2005. He is also known for many development projects in karachi, some inherited plans from previous nazim and some new ones.

The MQM had the most elected members in the City District Government of Karachi (CDGK) elections in 2005.

== Ethnic politics ==
The demographics of Karachi are important as most politics in Karachi is driven and influenced by ethnic affiliation. The success of the MQM has always been patronized by the fact that city's population is dominated by the Muhajir people who remain loyal to the party, which was originally created and led by Altaf Hussain as a means to fight for the community's rights. Today, the party's following and fan base has declined because of the militancy mindset and aggressive political approach. Pashtuns make up second largest ethnic group in Karachi with 7.0 million pashtuns living in Karachi. Huge Number of Pashtuns live in the city from early 1960s, most of them belong to the Khyber-Pakhtunkhwa province and started to migrate to Karachi in the early 1960s during the Ayub Khan dictatorship and were employed as labourers in the city's widespread construction business. Some of them, including those of Afghan origin, identify with more puritanical and conservative traditions and have been known supporters of ultra-conservative groups. Those who are secular support the left-wing Awami National Party (ANP). Simultaneously, some of the Punjabi community supports moderate conservative parties such as the Pakistan Muslim League (N) and the Punjabi Pakhtun Ittehad (PPI).

== Language politics ==
1972 Language violence in Sindh occurred starting on July 7, 1972, when the Sindh Assembly passed the Sind Teaching, Promotion and Use of Sindhi Language Bill, 1972 which established Sindhi language as the sole official language of the province resulting in language violence in Sindh, Pakistan.

== 2008 General Elections ==
During the 2008 Pakistani general election, most of the seats in Karachi were won by the MQM followed by the Pakistan Peoples Party (PPP). The results showed and finalised a tilt in the favour of MQM from the city in terms of both provincial and federal politics, tough it has been claimed that MQM rigged many of the polling booths in this elections.

== 2013 General Elections ==
The MQM swept the elections by winning 18 of the 19 National Assembly seats, but the PTI emerged as the second largest party as well as making dents in the MQM's Muhajir vote bank. The PTI and JI accused the MQM of rigging the elections.

== 2015 Municipal elections ==
The municipal elections for the 247 union councils and union committees of Karachi are as follows: District West 6 union councils, 46 union committees, District South 31 union councils and committees, Korangi 37 union committees, Malir 32 union councils and 13 union committees and District Central 51 union committees. Apart from election for chairman and vice-chairman of 247 union councils and committees 1520 ward councilors will also be elected, while direct polls will be held for 1235 seats, based upon the discretion of a candidate or group having majority in the panel. The municipal elections were held in Karachi on December 5, 2015, and the most seats in the city were won by the Muttahida Qaumi Movement (MQM). The MQM won 138, PPP won 25, Jamaat-e-Islami and PTI alliance won only 17 union council seats. Waseem Akhtar was nominated as the next Mayor of Karachi on December 15, 2015.

== 2018 General Elections ==
The elections were swept by Imran Khan's Pakistan Tehreek-e-Insaf who won 13 out of Karachi's 21 seats in the National Assembly. The previously dominant Muttahida Quami Movement only managed to win 4 seats, and the Mustafa Kamal-led Pak Sarzameen Party did not win any seats. The MQM and PSP claimed the elections were rigged to favour the PTI.

== See also ==
- 2007 Karachi riots
- Culture of Karachi
- Demographics of Karachi
- Economy of Karachi
- History of Karachi
- 2008 Pakistani general election
- Pakistan general election, 2013
- Pakistan general election, 2018
- Imran Khan
- Arif Alvi
