= Manhunt (military) =

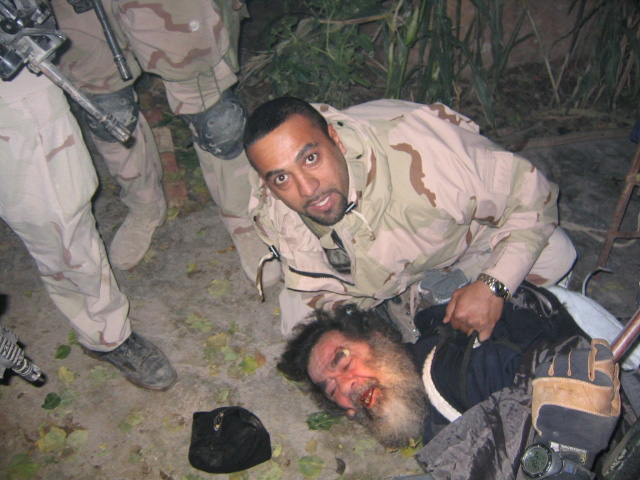
Saddam Hussein found in his spider hole

Manhunting is a term sometimes used for military operations by special operations forces and intelligence organizations to search for, and capture or kill important enemy combatants, known as high-value targets. It has been used particularly in the United States during the war on terror.

The most visible such operations conducted involve counterterrorist activities. Some involve government-sanctioned targeted killing or extrajudicial execution, and such operations have drawn political and legal controversy. Other military operations, such as hostage rescue or personnel recovery, employ similar tactics and techniques.

The term has been used for some US operations such as Operation Red Dawn, the apprehension of Saddam Hussein, the search for Abu Musab al-Zarqawi, the killing of Osama bin Laden in May 2011, and Operation Absolute Resolve, the apprehension of Nicolás Maduro.

== See also ==
- Assassination
- Combat tracking
- Targeted killing
- Manhunt (law enforcement)
- Extraordinary rendition
