= Rise and Kill First =

2018 book by Ronen Bergman

Rise and Kill First: The Secret History of Israel's Targeted Assassinations
- Front cover page of the book.
- Author: Ronen Bergman
- Translator: Ronnie Hope
- Language: English
- Publisher: Random House
- Publication date: February 1, 2018
- Publication place: United States
- Pages: 750
- Website: riseandkillfirst.com

Rise and Kill First: The Secret History of Israel's Targeted Assassinations is a 2018 book by Ronen Bergman about the history of targeted assassinations by Israel's intelligence services. Its author writes that Israel has assassinated more people than any western country since World War II. It portrays the assassinations of British government officials, Hamas, Hezbollah and Palestine Liberation Organization (PLO) leaders, and Iranian nuclear scientists. To write the book, Bergman carried out about a thousand interviews with political figures and secret agents and consulted "thousands" of documents.

== Synopsis ==
Rise and Kill First describes the targeted killings carried out by Israeli secret agencies and the personalities and the tactics used. The book's title is inspired by the Talmud: "If someone comes to kill you, rise up and kill him first" (Hebrew: הבא להורגך השכם להורגו). Based on a thousand interviews and thousands of documents, the book is the story of many political and intelligence figures such as agents of Mossad, Shin Bet, and the Israeli military, some of them speaking under their real identity. Ehud Barak and Ehud Olmert, former Israeli prime ministers, and Meir Dagan, a recent head of Mossad for eight years, were among those interviewed.

The book begins with the founding of Bar Giora in 1907 by Yitzhak Ben Zvi. The organization later became Hashomer, then the Haganah and finally the core of the Israel Defense Forces (IDF). According to Bergman, Israeli covert agencies have undertaken targeted assassinations against "Arab adversaries throughout its pre- and post-statehood periods". They have assassinated more people than any Western state has since World War II, carrying out "at least" 2,700 assassination operations in the seventy-year period since Israel's state formation. "Poisoned toothpaste that takes a month to end its target's life, armed drones, exploding mobile phones, spare tires with remote-controlled bombs, assassinating enemy scientists and discovering the secret lovers of Muslim clerics," are among the methods described in the book used by Israel to carry out assassinations. Bergman discusses the assassination of British officials, Hamas, Hezbollah and PLO leaders, and Iranian nuclear scientists. Among the assassinations described are those of Ali Hassan Salameh, leader of Black September; Abu Jihad, Arafat's aide and co-founder of the Fatah party; Yahya Ayyash, known as the "Engineer", Hamas' chief bomb maker; and Ahmed Bouchiki, a Moroccan waiter. The book also strongly implies that Israel assassinated Yasser Arafat, although the author stated that Israel's military censorship prohibits him from even stating whether he knows that for a fact or not. Menachem Begin, Yitzak Shamir, Ehud Barak and Ariel Sharon, the latter described by Bergman as a "pyromaniac", each of whom would later lead the government of Israel, are named as assassins in Rise and Kill First.

Bergman describes the details of operations carried out in Iran, Egypt, Syria, and Germany. According to the book, Ariel Sharon mistakenly ordered Mossad to shoot down a plane that was carrying 30 wounded Palestinian children who were survivors of the Sabra and Shatila massacre. The operation was cancelled "at the last moment" after it was reported that Arafat was not on board. He "even" consented to the downing of a commercial plane if it was carrying Arafat, Bergman says in his book.

The book also recites secret favours carried out by the Mossad at the request of foreign governments and leaders, such as allegedly for King Hassan II of Morocco.

== Reception ==
According to Kenneth M. Pollack, a former CIA intelligence analyst, the book is "smart, thoughtful and balanced, and the English translation is superb", while it fails to "answer ... the problem of terrorism", and offers no end to it. Pollack describes the end of the book as showing targeted killing is like an addictive drug which just cures the "worst symptom of a terrible disease" but does not cure the disease itself. The book is described by Ethan Bronner, a senior editor at Bloomberg News, as "the first comprehensive look at Israel's use of state-sponsored killings," and as a "meticulously researched book" by Charles Glass, an author, journalist, broadcaster and publisher specialising in the Middle East.

=== Awards ===
- 2018: National Jewish Book Award in the History category

== Research ==
According to Bergman, the Mossad tried to intervene in his work, holding a meeting in 2010 to disrupt his research and warning former employees against giving interviews to him.
