= MQM militancy =

Militancy involving MQM

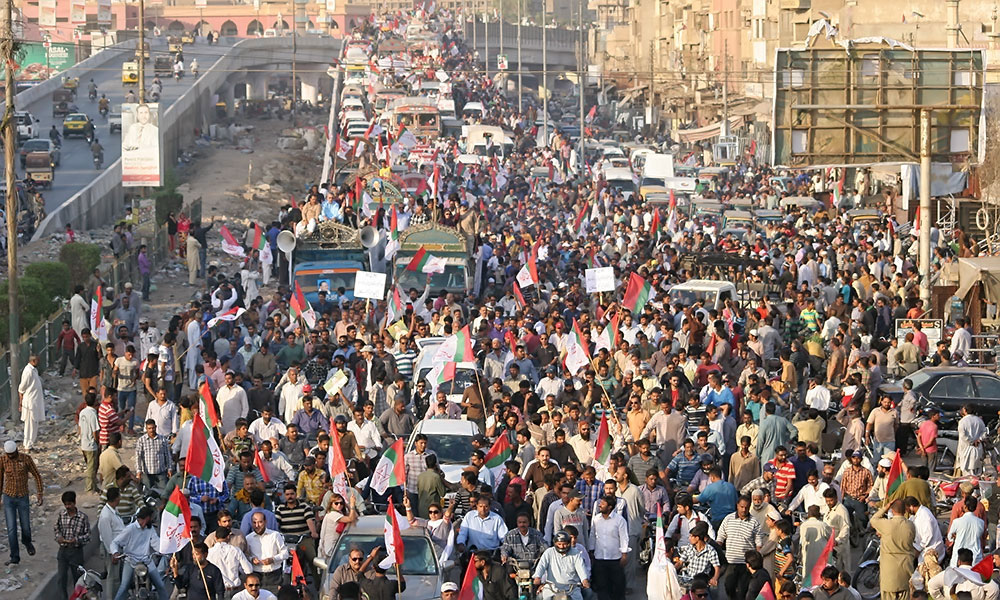
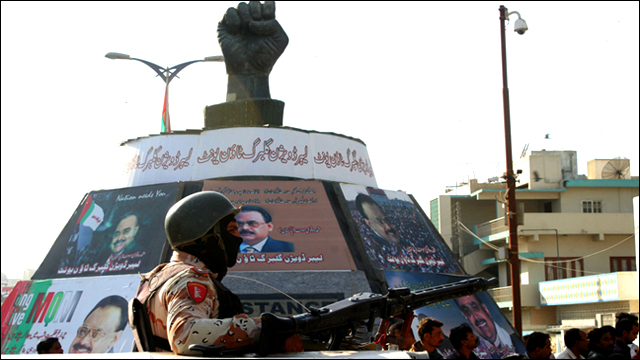
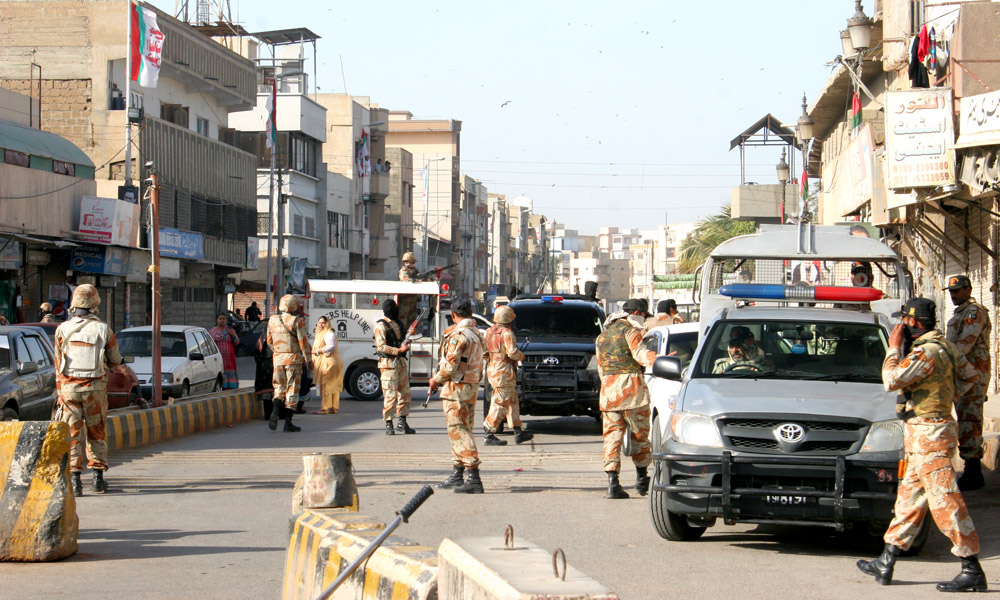
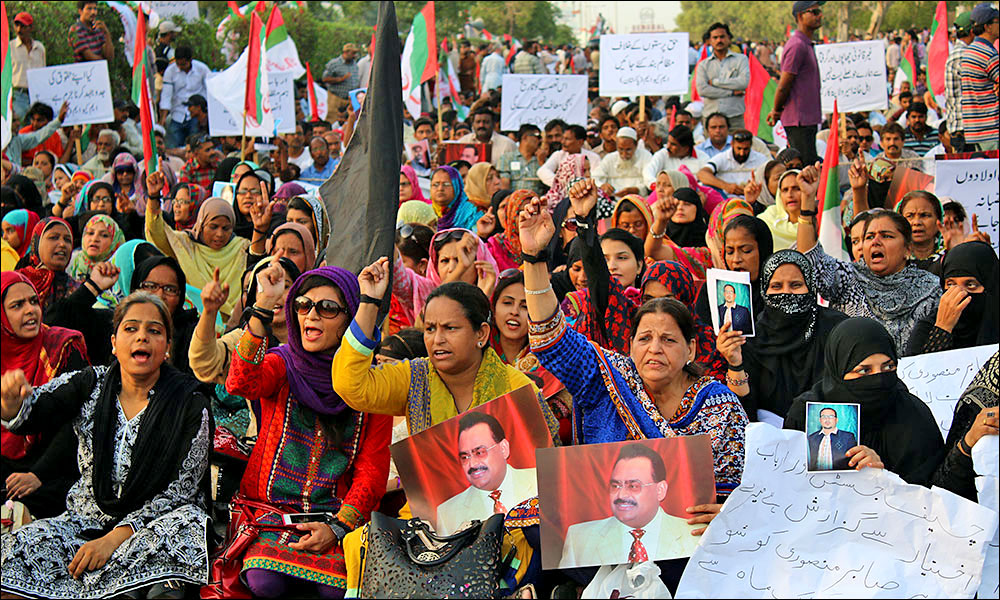
- Clockwise from top left: MQM protesting against arrest of its workers. Rangers in Karachi while MQM headquarters, Nine Zero, is raided. Sindh Rangers under attack in Karachi, November 2015. MQM protesting for extra-judicial killings of their workers.
Date	1978–2025 (47 years): First Phase (high-scale): 1978–1992 (14 years); Operation Clean-up (Mid-Scale): 1992–1994 (2 years); Second Phase (Insurgency Era): 1994–2016 (22 years); Third Phase (low-scale): 2016–2025 (9 years)
Location	Karachi and Hyderabad, Sindh, Pakistan
Result	Sindh government victory: Success of Operation Clean-up, Operation Lyari, and Karachi Targeted-Action; Exile of Altaf Hussain; End of MQM-related violence; Closure and demolition of Nine Zero, MQM's headquarters; MQM strongholds in Karachi and Hyderabad within Sindh dismantled; Splitting of MQM-H, PSP and MQM-P from MQM-L
Territorial changes	Government control, law and order restored in Karachi

Opposing sides
MQM	Government of Pakistan; Sindh; Karachi Government; Pakistan Police; Civil Armed Forces; Pakistani Intelligence community; Supported by: Pakistan Army	First Phase: JIP; (no border) IJT; STPP; JSSF; Armed Afghan immigrants
MQM-L (no border) MQM-H	Government of Pakistan; Sindh; Karachi Government; Pakistan Police; Civil Armed Forces; Pakistani Intelligence community; Supported by: Pakistan Army	Second & Third Phase: ANP: PPP; PAC; Sunni Tehreek; TLP (from 2015); SUP Sindhi separatists: JSQM; JSMM; JSSF; SLA; SRA; SPA TTP Formerly: Jund-Allah (until 2014); SSP (until 2018); LeJ (until 2024); Jamaat-ul-Ahrar

Commanders and leaders
Altaf Hussain; Imran Farooq X; Azeem Ahmed Tariq X; Farooq Dada †; Saeed Bharam (until 2016) (POW); Anis Kaimkhani (until 2013); Hammad Siddiqui (until 2016); Syed Mustafa Kamal (until 2013); Farooq Sattar (until 2016); Afaq Ahmed	Shehbaz Sharif; Asif Ali Zardari; Asim Munir; List: Former: Imran Khan; Nawaz Sharif; Benazir Bhutto X; Arif Alvi; Farooq Leghari; Ghulam Ishaq Khan; Qamar Javed Bajwa; Raheel Sharif; Asif Nawaz Janjua; Abdul Waheed Kakar; Mirza Aslam Beg	Asfandyar Wali Khan; Asif Ali Zardari; Bilawal Bhutto; Yusuf Raza Gilani; Noor Wali Mehsud; Shafi Muhammad Burfat; Darya Khan; List: PPP: Benazir Bhutto X; Lyari gangsters: Rehman Dakait †; Zafar Baloch X; Uzair Baloch (POW); TTP: Hakimullah Mehsud †; Baitullah Mehsud †; SSP: Azam Tariq †; Sindhi Nationalist: Ghulam Murtaza Syed #

Units involved
MQM-L; Good Friends; Sector Commanders (until 2015/16); Nadeem Commando (1990-96); Faheem Commando (1990-95); (no border) APMSO; (no border) MQM-H	Sindh; Karachi Government; Sindh Police; Sindh Rangers; Anti-Terrorism Wing; Pakistan Police; CTD; SSU; Civil Armed Forces; Federal Constabulary; Pakistan Rangers; Pakistani Intelligence community; NACTA; IB; FIA; SB; Supported by: Pakistan Army	Karachi Waliyat (TTP); Naeem Bukhari Group (from 2024); LeJ—Naeem Bukhari Group (until 2024); Sipah Sahaba Karachi branch (until 2018); ANP armed supporters and workers TLP supporters and protesters Armed IJT students Sindhi nationalist militants Jundallah (Karachi) terrorists Armed Afghan refugees

Strength
35,000 (2011)	Unknown	Unknown

Casualties and losses
Unknown	2,000 police Havaldars, officers, and informants killed (1991–2014)	Unknown
- 1,770–1,990 killed (1995); 700–750 killed (1994); 2,000 killed (1995); 748 killed (2010); 1,244–1,345 killed (2012); 2,909 killed (2014)

The MQM militancy referred to the militancy in Pakistan associated with the Muttahida Qaumi Movement (MQM) political party, formerly known as the Mohajir Qaumi Movement, and even further back known as the All Pakistan Mohajir Students Organization (APMSO).

== History ==
=== Rise (1978–1992) ===
The ancestor of the MQM was the All Pakistan Muttahidda Students Organization (APMSO), which drew its support from Muhajir defectors from the heavily armed Islami Jamiat ut-Taleba (IJT). A large number of Jamaat-i-Islami members who were ethnic Muhajirs shifted their loyalties to the MQM overnight, resulting in the elimination of the former influence of the Jamaat. APMSO was radicalised when in 1985-86 the first (of the many) major clashes took place between Karachi's Muhajir and Pushtun communities. Faced by the superior firepower brought in by Afghan refugees, MQM dispatched a delegation of APMSO members to Hyderabad to meet a militant group from the Sindhi nationalist student organization, the JSSF. APMSO were given some small firearms by PSF in the early 1980s, but it was JSSF that sold the APMSO its first large cache of AK-47s that were then used to tame the heavily armed IJT in 1987 and 1988, eventually breaking IJT's hold at KU and in various other state-owned campuses in Karachi. Amidst ethnic violence, MQM's armed wings used street fighting and urban warfare as ethnic Muhajirs sought to use violence to control governing structures and appointments such as the Karachi Port Trust, Karachi Municipal Corporation and the Karachi Developmental Authority. During the MQM's stint in power in 1991, when it was part of the provincial government of Sindh, the party endorsed and participated in raids and the mass-arrests of its political rivals. Additionally, the MQM, supported by the government, was accused of operating as a mafia organization where its heavily armed militants used extortion and coercion to increase their influence.

=== 1994–2016 Violence ===
During the months of May and June in 1994, the MQM carried out a series of attacks following the end of Operation clean-up. These included car bombings, riots, and secret killings, leading to the deaths of around 750 people, including non-native Urdu speakers and others who were considered opponents of MQM. The conflict was its most bloodiest in May 1995, when MQM militants resurfaced to the ground, and attacked government offices, police stations and ambushed police patrols using assault rifles, pistols, small arms, and even rocket launchers. Although sporadic ethnic violence and sectarian violence had been a permanent feature of the Karachi landscape since the 1980s, the level of organization and intensity of the violence in 1995 was unprecedented. About 300 people were killed in the month of June, the death toll reached 600 deaths in two months and 2,000 deaths in a year attributed to ethnic violence, leading analysts to compare the situation to the Kashmir insurgency which were also taking place in the 1990s. On June 25, 1995, nearly 80 policemen were killed in a five-week long assault by the MQM militants, and a total of 221 security forces were killed over the year, while over the course of 70 police operations more than 121 terrorists were killed who were believed to be affiliated with MQM. By 1996 it was described as a virtual civil war between the Pakistani Law Enforcement and Pakistani Paramilitary Forces on one side and MQM-affiliated militants on the other. In 2002, the MQM assumed office in the Sindh Provincial Government and were elected to the Karachi City Government from 2006 to 2008, while newspapers in Karachi were accusing the MQM of eliminating opponents with impunity. This also involved violent, unchecked land expansion and real estate 'entrepreneurs' who were speculated to be illegally or violently occupying land driven by powerful political patrons in the MQM. Karachi experienced an exceptionally high level of violence in 2011 with some 800 people killed, where the MQM was widely viewed as the perpetrator of targeted killings, out of a total 1800 killings in Karachi.

== Militant recruits ==
MQM's armed wing was composed of thousands of criminals, hitmen and university student-origin activists belonging to APMSO. MQM's militant wing had as many as 35,000 militants in Karachi and Hyderabad. According to ethnographic research conducted by Khan and Gayer, the militant members of the MQM were made up of both professional militants and part-time militants, the latter who carried out violent activities only occasionally. Some of the professional militants were trained in Afghanistan, and the MQM had a separate headquarters known as 'peeli kothi' located in Liaquatabad/Lalukhet, where they planned and organized violent activities. Initially, this location was used as a torture chamber for the party's political opponents, and later, it housed party cadres recruited for violent activities. The Sindh Rangers alleged that the MQM's military wing had an "elite corps" engaged in torture and murder without the approval or knowledge of the party's leadership. The recruitment process included inspiration from Altaf Hussain and the promise of "career, income, power, respect, leadership, and brotherly love."

=== Criticism ===
In the mid-1990s, the U.S State Department, Amnesty International, Human Rights Watch, and others accused MQM-London and a rival faction, MQM-Haqiqi, of summary killings, torture, and other abuses. The MQM-A (Altaf) routinely denied any involvement in the violence.

The party's use of extra-legal activities in conflicts with political opponents have led it to be accused of terrorism. The party's strongly hierarchical order and personalist leadership style led to some critics labelling the MQM as fascist. Additionally, MQM was accused of operating as a mafia organization where its heavily armed militants used extortion and coercion to increase their influence.

The Associated Press referred to MQM as an ethnic militant group. The government blamed MQM for much of the killings in Karachi in the 1990s.

== Crackdowns on MQM ==
=== Pucca Qila Operation (1990) ===
The Pakka Qila Operation was launched by Sindh Police to target MQM workers in Pakka Qilla Hyderabad. Anywhere from 70–250 besieged people were killed during the operation, which carried on for 275 hours before Pakistan army troops were ordered by the President to move in in order to stop the violence.

=== 1992–94 ===
From 1992 to 1994, the MQM was the target of Operation Clean-up. The period is regarded as the bloodiest period in Karachi's history, with thousands of MQM militants, workers, and supporters killed or gone missing. Although more 30 years have passed since the alleged arrest or disappearance of MQM workers, families of the missing people are still hopeful after registering the cases in the Supreme Court of Pakistan. The operation left thousands of civilians dead. During Operation Blue Fox there was growing concern that the Sindh rangers and Sindh police were involved in human rights abuses, including beatings, extortion, disappearances and torture of suspected militants in encounters. As the police and rangers carried out raids, mass round-ups and siege-and-search operations in pursuit of MQM (Altaf) leaders and militants for over 30 months, thousands of ordinary MQM workers and supporters were subjected to arbitrary arrest and detention, beatings, torture, extortion, and other ill-treatment.

=== 1994–96 Operation ===
During tenure of Prime Minister Benazir Bhutto, interior minister Naseerullah Babar conducted second operation against MQM between 1994 and 1996. On 5 September 1995, 8 MQM supporters were killed and 11 were injured when security forces attacked what the MQM billed as a peaceful protest against abuses by security forces against MQM female workers. Due to serious doubts over credibility of operation due to encounters, extrajudicial executions and rise of killings in Karachi, Benazir Bhutto's government was dismissed by the then President of Pakistan, Farooq Ahmed Laghari.

==== Killing of Farooq Dada ====
On 2 August 1995, Farooq Patni, alias Farooq Dada, and three other MQM militants, Javed Michael, Ghaffar Mada and Hanif Turk, were shot dead by police in an armed encounter near the airport when they failed to stop and opened fire on the police.

Farooq Dada was the leader of MQM's Nadeem Commando and was considered to be Pakistan's most wanted man and had a 1.5 million rupee (500k US dollar) price on his head and was wanted for over 140 cases and the murder of over two dozen police officers. Dada was allegedly involved in many killings, extortions and kidnappings.

Armed police officers were waiting for him near the airport after being told that he was moving weapons from the Karachi's Malir district. The Sindh Police claimed that Farooq Dada and three others were on their way to Jinnah International Airport to blow up a PIA plane when police, moved in after being tipped off on their whereabouts. Dada and his three accomplices opened fire on the police as they attempted to do stop and pin down his car. A gun battled ensued in which 10 heavily armed officers fired back back. When officers examined the wreckage of his car they found a weapons cache which included machine guns, AKMs, 4 thousand rounds of ammunition and even an RPG-7.

Despite this, their family members claimed that the men had earlier been arrested from their homes. Another MQM worker, Mohammad Altaf, arrested later on the same day was reportedly identified by Farooq Dada and his three companions when they were brought to Altaf's house by police to help identify him. Witnesses were reported to have seen the four MQM workers at the time of Altaf's arrest; they were, at that time, reportedly held in shackles.

=== 1998 Operation ===
In the aftermath of Hakeem Saeed's assassination, federal rule was imposed by Prime Minister Nawaz Sharif in Sindh and an operation was initiated against MQM.

=== 2015–16 Nine Zero Raids ===
Due to MQM involvement behind the deadly fire that claimed the lives of at least 258 factory workers in order to take extorted money from owners, in 2015 MQM's Headquarter Nine Zero was raided twice by the paramilitary Sindh Rangers and many top officials of MQM were taken into custody. On 11 March 2015, Pakistan Rangers carried out a raid at Nine Zero, the headquarters of MQM in Karachi as well as the party’s public secretariat Khursheed Begum Memorial Hall and arrested over 100 MQM activists. At least 27 suspects were presented before an anti-terrorism court. Rangers claimed that they apprehended nearly half a dozen target killers – including Faisal Mehmood, aka 'Faisal Mota', who was sentenced to death in the murder case of Geo News journalist Wali Khan Babar in 2011 and a huge quantity of arms and ammunition, walkie-talkies, binoculars and other military gear used by NATO forces in Afghanistan were also seized during the raid. In 2015, a senior policeman, had placed the figure of deaths of MQM workers at 1,000, saying a majority of the deaths were extrajudicial killings. Three other serving officials confirmed the assessment. In 2015, the HRCP expressed concern over the rise in extrajudicial killings and lack of transparency about the number of MQM activists picked up or later let off.

In 2016, the Sindh Rangers conducted a second raid on Nine Zero are a speech by Altaf Hussain where he said: 'Pakistan Murdabad' (Death to Pakistan) and later ordered an attack on an ARY channel office which faced much criticism from the media. In this speech, he also incited the party workers to attack Pakistani media houses, which resulted in street rioting and one death in Karachi. On the orders of Chief of Army Staff, General Raheel Sharif, the paramilitary Sindh Rangers immediately raided sealed multiple MQM offices including Nine Zero. On August 22, 2016, the Headquarters was sealed and hundreds of MQM offices were bulldozed. This 2016 Rangers raid turned out to be a turning point for MQM party or some people call it a beginning of the MQM's end as a political party. During Nine Zero raid, MQM worker Waqas Shah was shot by a Ranger's 9mm pistol fire from point blank range. The video evidence released on electronic media confirmed the incident. Farooq Sattar's coordination officer Syed Aftab Ahmed was killed while in the custody of paramilitary forces. Initially the force denied torture and stated that he died of heart attack but it had to accept after social media publicized videos of torture marks on Aftab's body and autopsy report conforming death due to torture. During the raid on Nine Zero, Syed Waqas Ali Shah was shot by rangers. “Don’t misbehave with the women” were said to be the 25-year-old Shah's last words to Rangers personnel, who according to eye-witnesses accounts were pushing aside women who were protesting outside the MQM headquarters (Nine Zero) against the operation. As a result of operation, MQM claimed 67 of its workers had been killed by the Sindh Rangers while 150 went missing and more than 5,000 were placed behind bars.

==== Aftermath ====
The 2016 Nine Zero raid was referred to as "the end of the story for the party founder, Altaf Hussain". A section of political analysts believed that the situation had already started worsening for MQM when London's Metropolitan Police arrested and detained Altaf Hussain, the party founder, in 2014 for an investigation involving money laundering, which dispelled the impression that he was untouchable and safe in Britain, despite the charges ultimately being dropped due to a lack of evidence.

== End of militancy ==
=== Altaf Hussain's August 2025 announcement ===
On 12 August 2025, Altaf Hussain, founder of Muttahida Qaumi Movement–London, addressed a global gathering of MQM workers via video link and declared that he was "relieving all party workers of their oath of allegiance to him". He stated:

" For the past 47 years, I have been struggling for the rights of Pakistan’s deprived and oppressed people, especially the Muhajir community. I have worked day and night without a single day off. In this struggle, we have endured the martyrdom of thousands of colleagues, enforced disappearances, displacement, destruction of homes, forced occupation of properties, and countless other sacrifices. My own family has not been spared either. My 28-year-old nephew, Arif Hussain, was hacked to death with an axe. My 70-year-old brother-in-law, Aslam Ibrahmani, was arrested from Karachi, brutally tortured for six months in Adiala jail, and dumped outside in a near-dead state, before he succumbed to his injuries. None of my siblings escaped the ordeal of repeated raids on their homes, forcing them into exile, Despite the martyrdom of thousands of comrades, the anguish of thousands of disappeared colleagues, and the imprisonment of many — including those still in jail — I have concluded that I have failed not only to change Pakistan’s rotten and outdated system, but also to secure the rights of my Muhajir nation. Therefore, from August 10, 2025, I relieve all comrades, including the former coordination committee, convener, deputy convener, and all workers, from the oath of loyalty they took to the movement and to me. They are now free to join any political party they wish, wherever they wish, and wherever they wish. As long as I live, I will continue the movement to achieve rights through social media. Success or failure is in the hands of God. "

Hussain recounted past sacrifices, including the enforced disappearance and killing of his brother and nephew.

=== Interpretation as party dissolution ===
Commentators and media outlets widely interpreted the statement as effectively signalling the dissolution of MQM–London as a political organization, owing to the removal of its foundational loyalty structure.

== See also ==
- MQM violence (1994–2016)
- Operation Clean-up
- Operation Lyari
- Insurgency in Sindh
- Insurgency in Balochistan
- Insurgency in Khyber Pakhtunkhwa
- Terrorism in Pakistan
- Sectarian violence in Pakistan
- Separatist movements of Pakistan
