= Muhajir nationalism =

Ideology asserting that the Muhajirs are a distinct nation

Muhajir nationalism is an ideology that emphasizes that Muhajirs are one nation and promotes the cultural unity of Muhajirs, using the ideology politicians from MQM, also support the vision of Muhajir Province. The demands of the Muhajir nationalist movement are linguistic, cultural, economic and political rights. Amir H. Kazmi is considered as the Father of Muhajir nationalism. Muhajir nationalism, as put by Adeel Khan, was a political response to loss of their erstwhile influence in state machinery. Muhajir nationalists also generally advocate for the creation of a province for the Muhajir people.

== Background ==
The Muhajir people (also spelled Mohajir and Mahajir) are the Muslim immigrants of various ethnic and regional groups who migrated to Pakistan following the Partition of India. They are spread across the Urban Areas of Pakistan, particularly forming a majority in the city of Karachi. Throughout the years, there have been many tensions between them and the Sindhi people. The Muhajirs were generally socially liberal, however despite this, they supported the two main religious parties: The Jamaat-i-Islami, and the Jamiat Ulema-i-Pakistan. This was due to the fact that the Muhajirs were not native to the land and hence supported a multi-ethnic and pluralistic identity based on Islam that was advocated for by the religious parties. As the rise of Muhammad Ayub Khan in the military coup in 1958 reduced the influence of the Muhajirs, the community would begin strongly opposing his dictatorship starting from the early 1960s, primarily voting for Fatima Jinnah in the 1964 election. When Zulfikar Ali Bhutto, a Sindhi was elected Prime Minister of Pakistan, the Muhajirs feared that they would be sidelined in favour of the Sindhis and hence strongly supported the 1977 right wing government (generally led by the religious parties). However, the Pakistan National Alliance did not return the Muhajir ruling class, despite the Jamaat-e-Islami forming an important part of General Zia-ul-haq's 1977 military coup.

== History ==
Disillusioned following the removal of nearly a 1000 Urdu-speaking officials and the imposition of an ethnolinguistic quota system by the Bhutto administration and the Pakistan National Alliance, numerous Muhajir politicians such as Altaf Hussain became involved in student activism. He was a proactive person at Karachi University. He, founded an organisation called the All Pakistan Muhajir Students Organisation (APMSO) in 1978, seeking to curb Muhajir prejudice. Later on, another organisation, the Muhajir Qaumi Movement (MQM) was also founded by Azim Ahmed Tariq. Tensions between the ethnic groups of Sindh led to mob violence in 1985 and have persisted to the modern day. It was during Zia-ul-Haq's rule that the term "Muhajir nationalism" began repeatedly being used, advocating for the unity of the Muhajirs. Shortly after Zia expanded the quota system for another decade, the APMSO merged with the MQM, opposing the dominance of Punjab. The project was a success and by 1992, the MQM was the second-largest political party in Sindh.

The partnership between the MQM and the PPP only increased tensions between the Sindhis and the Muhajirs, and eventually collapsed in 1989, leading to a very bloody moment in Karachi's history. Following this violence, numerous operations took place against the MQM, particularly Operation Clean-up which was based on accusations of the MQM seeking to create an autonomous Muhajir State called Jinnahpur. The MQM later on changed its name to the Muttahaida Qaumi Movement to appeal to a wider base, but no significant change occurred in its politics and Muhajirs were still not allowed to be members of the Party. The MQM finally halted hostilities with the administration when General Pervez Musharaff took control of the nation. Beginning in 2002, the MQM further added dimensions to Muhajir nationalism, portraying Muhajirs as "Urdu-speaking Sindhis" who were connected to the Sindhi speakers of the prove through a spiritual bond from the teachings of the Saint Shah Abdul Latif. The MQM had significant influence during the duration of the Musharaff era, but the fall of Musharaff in 2008 led to the reduction of Muhajir influence. The renewed conflict with the administration during the Sharif Regime led to Altaf Hussain fleeing Pakistan and heightened factionalism in the party, leading to the weakening of the MQM and the ideology of Muhajir Nationalism in favour of the PTI during the 2018 general election. However, the MQM-P partially saw its success return in the 2024 general election.
