= Nadeem Nusrat =

Pakistani-American politician

Convener of the Muttahida Qaumi Movement London
- In office 16 October 2015 – 2017
- Preceded by: Imran Farooq
- Succeeded by: Nadeem Ehsan

Personal details
- Party: Muttahida Qaumi Movement London (until 2017)
- Movement: Voice of Karachi

Nadeem Nusrat (Urdu: ندیم نصرت) is a Pakistani-American politician who had been former convener and leader of Muttahida Qaumi Movement London.

== Political career ==
=== Convener MQM London (MQM-L) ===
Nadeem Nusrat became acting convener of MQM-L on 16 October 2015 filling the office held prior by deceased MQM leader Imran Farooq. The post was left vacant after the death of Imran Farooq. Nadeem Nusrat was primarily responsible for running the MQM International Secretariat.

==== Responsibilities post 22 August 2016 event ====
After defection of many MQM leaders in Pakistan, Altaf Hussain made Nadeem Nusrat second in command to head of all the affairs of the party in London.

=== End of role as MQM London convener ===
In 2017, it was reported that Nusrat has parted ways with MQM London which was later confirmed in May 2018 by MQM's London based leadership.

== Rift from MQM-London ==
He later launched his own political movement named Free Karachi which was later renamed Voice of Karachi, changing its mission from a voice against the state atrocities against Mohajirs in Pakistan to becoming a critic of former MQM and its leader Altaf Hussain. In 2021 Nusrat claimed an attack on his life in Houston, United States, which was later refuted by the police and the "suspect" was released. His close aide Wasay Jaleel parted ways from VOK soon after and remains inactive until this day.
