= Muttahida Qaumi Movement – London =

Muttahida Qaumi Movement – London متحدہ قومی موومنٹ - لندن
- Leader: Altaf Hussain
- Spokesperson: Aftab Baqai
- Convener: Mustafa Azizabadi
- Founder: Altaf Hussain
- Founded: 18 March 1984
- Dissolved: 12 August 2025
- Preceded by: Muhajir Qaumi Movement; All Pakistan Muhajir Students Organization
- Headquarters: Edgware, London, United Kingdom (last/final); Nine Zero, Karachi, Sindh, Pakistan (former, demolished in 2016)
- Student wing: All Pakistan Muttahidda Students Organization (APMSO)
- Ideology: Liberalism; Social liberalism Muhajir nationalism Secularism
- Political position: Centre
- Colors: Red, green and white
- Slogan: Empowering People

Party flag
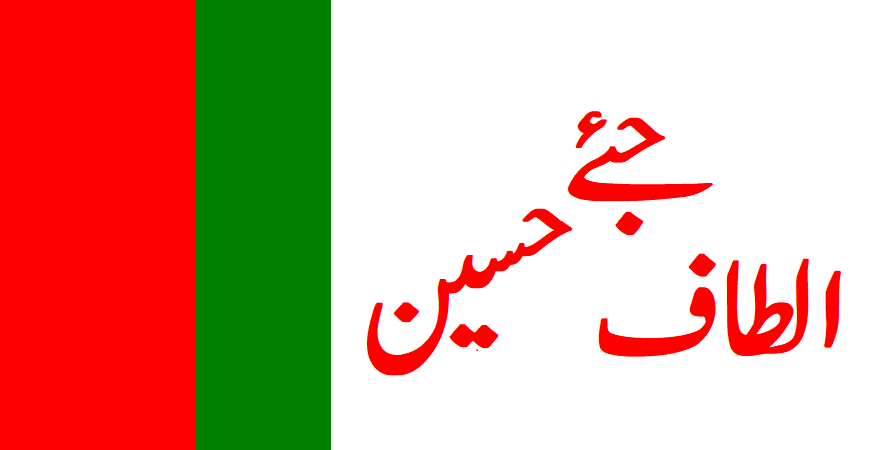

Website
- www.mqm.org

The Muttahida Qaumi Movement – London (Urdu: متحدہ قومی موومنٹ - لندن, Muttaḥidah Qọ̄mī Mūwmaṅṫ Laundan), also known as MQM–London (Urdu: ایم کیو ایم - لندن), previously known as the Muhajir Qaumi Movement – Altaf (Note: Urdu: مہاجر قومی موومنٹ۔الطاف, Moḥajir Qọ̄mī Mūwmaṅṫ - Alta'af) or MQM–Altaf, (Note: Urdu: ایم کیو ایم - الطاف, MQM - Alta'af) was a Muhajir nationalist and secular socio-liberalist political party in Pakistan that was founded by Altaf Hussain in 1984. Currently the party was split between multiple factions. The MQM–London faction, which was controlled by Altaf Hussain from London, while the separate MQM–Pakistan was run by Khalid Maqbool Siddiqui based in Pakistan, while another, the MQM-Haqiqi faction, was led by Afaq Ahmed. Its electoral symbol was a kite.

It was founded as a student organization, All Pakistan Muhajir Student Organization (APMSO), in 1978 by Altaf Hussain. APMSO gave birth to the Muhajir Qaumi Movement in 1984. In 1997, the MQM removed the term Muhajir (which denoted the party's roots among the country's Urdu-speaking community) from its name and replaced it with Muttahida ("United"). The MQM was generally known as the party that once held strong mobilizing potential in Karachi, having formerly been the dominant political force in the city.

The party had kept its influence over Pakistan's federal government as a key coalition partner since the late 1980's (including 1988–1990, 1990–1992, 2002–2007, 2008–2013). However, in 2015, MQM parliamentarians resigned from the National Assembly, Senate and Provincial Assembly of Sindh in protest against a crackdown on party supporters.

In August 2016, after Altaf Hussain's controversial 22 August speech, there was a crackdown on the party. Nine Zero, the party's headquarters in Karachi, was raided, sealed, and bulldozed. The party's leaders residing in Pakistan, including Farooq Sattar, were arrested, and most elected parliamentarians in the MQM disassociated themselves from Altaf Hussain due to his speech. MQM terminated Farooq Sattar's party membership for party rules violations, from where he then formed his own MQM faction.

The party was officially dissolved on 12 August 2025 by Altaf Hussain who, after having worked for it for almost 47 years since its founding in 1978, told his party workers that they were free to join any party that they wished. This came after the party had been inactive for almost 9 years since the Nine Zero raids of 2016. Hussain cited the repression of his family, continued persecution of his followers, failing to secure rights for Muhajirs, and Pakistan's rigid and unchangeable system for doing so.

== History ==
=== Founding ===
The first political organization of Muhajirs, called the All Pakistan Muhajir Student Organization (APMSO), was founded on 11 June 1978 by Altaf Hussain at Karachi University. On March 18, 1984, the APMSO evolved into a proper political organization—the Muhajir Qaumi Movement. It was launched to protect the Muhajir community who perceived themselves as the victims of discrimination and repression by the quota system that gave preference to certain ethnicities for admissions in educational institutions and employment in civil services.

=== Late 1986 to 1990 ===
In its early years, MQM drew enormous crowds, the epitome of which was the rally of August 8, 1986 at Nishtar Park, Karachi. Three years into its existence, MQM won the November 1987 local body elections in Karachi and Hyderabad and had several mayors win unopposed. Pakistan Peoples Party (PPP) won the highest number of seats in the general election of 1988 and formed a coalition government in the Sindh Province with the help of MQM, which then had a larger mandate in urban Sindh in comparison to PPP whose majority of support came from rural areas of Sindh. A 59-point agreement, called the Karachi Accord, was signed which included statements about protection of the democratic system and political rights, urban development goals, and creating objective criteria for admission to universities and colleges. Within a few months of the agreement, differences surfaced and MQM ministers in the Sindh Cabinet resigned because the agreement was not implemented. Thus, the alliance broke up in October 1989 and MQM joined hands with PPP's opponents. During these times MQM made mark for public benefit initiatives. Khidmat-e-Khalq Committee, a social welfare initiative, was founded in 1978 which in 1998 transformed into Khidmat-e-Khalq Foundation (KKF).

=== 1990 to 1999 ===
In the elections of October 1990, MQM emerged as the third strongest party in the country. This time, it made its alliance with Islami Jamhoori Ittehad (IJI) to establish a provincial government in Sindh whereas IJI formed the federal government. During these times, small factions of MQM separated themselves on the main body of the party, and the largest among these factions was MQM Haqiqi (English: Truthful MQM), which was formed by Afaq Ahmad and Amir Khan. It was allegedly claimed that MQM Haqiqi was formed by the Sindh/Karachi Government to weaken MQM and was allegedly supported by them. In the following years, successive governments switched between forming alliances with MQM and fighting against it to establish greater control over Karachi.

From 1992 to 1994, the MQM was the target of Operation Clean-up, The period was regarded as the bloodiest period in Karachi's history, with thousands MQM workers and supporters killed or gone missing. Although more than 32 years to 34 years years have passed since the alleged arrest or disappearance of MQM workers, families of the missing people are still hopeful after registering the cases in the Supreme Court of Pakistan. The operation left thousands of people dead.

The violence gripped urban Sindh politics in the late 1980s after the end of President and Army Chief, General Zia-ul-Haq's era, and finally in 1992, the erstwhile government of Prime Minister Nawaz Sharif passed a resolution in assembly to launch an operation in Karachi to target 72 'big fishes'. The federal government gave the reasoning behind this operation, known as "Operation Clean-up", as the government's attempt to end terrorism in Karachi and to seize unauthorized arms. Operation Clean-Up, which ostensibly sought to eliminate all terrorists irrespective of their political affiliation, began in June 1992. MQM perceived this operation as an attempt to wipe out the party altogether. Political violence erupted while MQM organized protests and strikes. The resulting lawlessness prevailed in the largest metropolitan city of Pakistan, which led to the country's president dissolving the National Assembly.

During the 1992 violence Altaf Hussain left the country when a warrant was issued for him in connection with a murder. Since then, the political party was run by Hussain from self-imposed exile in London.

MQM boycotted the subsequent 1993 general elections claiming organized military intimidation but participated in provincial elections. MQM secured 27 seats in provincial assembly, in comparison to its political rival PPP which won 56 seats. This resulted in PPP forming both the provincial and federal governments. Whereas, MQM Haqiqi failed to gain any seats at federal or provincial level. Political violence gained momentum in 1993 and 1994. During the 1994 violence, heavily political killings were reported between MQM, MQM factions, and Sindhi nationalist groups. By July 1995, more than 1,800 people had been assassinated in Karachi. In 1997, MQM boycotted the general elections and officially changed the previously maintained name "Muhajir Qaumi Movement" to "Muttahida Qaumi Movement" (English: "Immigrant National Movement" to "United National Movement").

==== Accusations of violence ====
In the mid-1990s, MQM created widespread political violence and militancy that affected Pakistan's Sindh province, particularly Karachi, the port city that was the country's commercial capital. In the mid-1990s, the U.S. State Department, Amnesty International, and others accused MQM-London and a rival faction, MQM-Haqiqi, of summary killings, torture, and other abuses. The MQM-A (Altaf) routinely denied involvement in violence.

The party's use of extra-legal activities in conflicts with political opponents had led it to be accused of terrorism. The party's strongly hierarchical order and personalist leadership style led to some critics labelling the MQM as fascist.

==== Jinnahpur Conspiracy ====
During Operation Clean-up, MQM was accused of being anti-Pakistan and of planning a separatist break-away state, Jinnahpur. However, later some senior army officers, Brigadier (Retired) Imtiaz and Retired General Naseer Akhtar, confessed that Jinnahpur was "nothing but a drama" against MQM for the military operation and there was no map of Jinnahpur.

On October 19, 1992, Pakistani newspapers carried an ISPR press release, conveying Army's denial of the knowledge of the Jinnahpur plan. The ISPR, the public relations arm of the Pakistan Army stated, "The Army had no evidence concerning the so-called Jinnahpur plan, it is clarified that the newspaper story in question is baseless. The Army has neither handed over to the government any document or map as reported, nor is it in possession of any evidence concerning the so-called Jinnahpur plan. It is also factually wrong that the matter was discussed at any meeting of the corps commander." Asif Zardari who was then President of Pakistan is said to have "said in a court premises in Karachi that the Jinnahpur scandal was created to malign the MQM."

=== 2001 onwards ===
In 2001, MQM boycotted the local body elections but in the 2002 general elections, MQM won 17 out of 272 seats in national assembly.

In the 2008 elections, MQM won 25 seats in the National Assembly of Pakistan and 52 seats in the Provincial Assembly of Sindh.

In 2008, Foreign Policy released a Global Cities Index which named Mustafa Kamal as Mayor of the Moment, but Kamal gave all credit to Altaf Hussain.

In 2013, the Muttahida Qaumi Movement (MQM) filed a Rs.5 billion defamation suit against Pakistan Tehreek-i-Insaf chairman Imran Khan at the Sindh High Court for issuing statements against MQM chief Altaf Hussain.

MQM had also been threatened by Pakistani Taliban.

In June 2014, the Metropolitan Police raided the London home of its leader, Altaf Hussain, on suspicion of money-laundering.

The party had won majority in the local government election of Karachi and Hyderabad and brought its mayor in Karachi Metropolitan Corporation (KMC) and Hyderabad Municipal Corporation. in 2016, the then-mayor of Karachi, was im Akhtar, had been put behind bars without any charge by an anti-terror court and waited Sindh High Court to grant him bail in order to resume his office as the mayor of Karachi. Akhtar was released from detention on 16 November 2016 after getting bail on all 39 cases. MQM had also brought its chairman and vice chairman in the municipal committee of fourth largest city of Sindh Mirpurkhad.

==== 2018 election boycott ====
MQM and its leader Altaf Hussain decided to boycott elections in 2018 due to military intervention in political affairs. MQM-P which was a separate party now would instead contest for elections using the traditional MQM symbol, the kite. This would be the second boycott of general elections after 1993 and third boycott of all elections including local bodies election in 2001. The average turnout of Karachi constituencies was 40.4% in 2018 elections comparing to 55% in 2013.

== Party structure ==
The party was led by Altaf Hussain under whose supervision, members of the Rabita Committee (also known as Central Coordination Committee) formulate the party's political program. It consists of 24 members from Pakistan and 10 from London, United Kingdom. The party's Karachi-based organizational operations were held under its Karachi Tanzeemi Committee.

On 20 November 2011, Muttahida Qaumi Movement announced the formation of Central Executive Committee with its members drawn from Azad Jammu & Kashmir, Gilgit-Baltistan, Punjab, Khyber Pakhtoonkhawa, Balochistan and Sindh. Addressing a Press Conference, Farooq Sattar, a senior MQM official, told that the purpose of Central Executive Committee was to assist MQM Coordination Committee and the party in organizational matters, policy-making and preparation of manifesto.

MQM had several chapters across the world in the United States, Canada, South Africa, several European countries, and Japan. The heads of MQM North America were former Federal Minister Khalid Maqbool Siddiqui and Ibad Rehman.

== Electoral history ==
Electoral history and performance of MQM
General elections	Voting percentile %	Voting turnout	Seating graph	Presiding Convener of the party	Parliamentary position
1988	5.37%	1,068,868	13 / 207	Imran Farooq	In alliance with PPP/In Opposition
1990	7%	1,172,525	15 / 207	Altaf Hussain	In alliance with PML-N/In Opposition
1993	Non-participant	–	0 / 207	Altaf Hussain	See: Operation Blue Fox
1997	4.0%	764,207	12 / 207	Farooq Sattar	In alliance with PML-NIn Opposition
2002	3.1%	–	13 / 272	Farooq Sattar	In alliance with PML-Q
2008	7.4%	2,507,813	25 / 272	Babar Ghauri	In alliance with PPP
2013	5.41%	2,456,153	24 / 272	Faisal Sabzwari	In Opposition
2018	Non-participant	–	0 / 272	Altaf Hussain	See: Muttahida Qaumi Movement-Pakistan
2024 (Note: as Independent candidates under the panel name "Wafa Parast")	—N/a	—N/a	0 / 266	Nisar Ahmed Panhwar	—N/a

=== Azad Jammu and Kashmir ===
Historically, MQM has had success in Azad Jammu and Kashmir. The party first entered the AJK Legislative Assembly in the 2006 general election, winning two refugee seats. In the 2011 AJK general election, the MQM retained its presence by winning two refugee constituencies: LA-30 (Jammu and Others-I), where Muhammad Tahir Khokhar defeated candidates from the Pakistan Muslim League (N) and other parties, and LA-36 (Kashmir Valley-I), won by Muhammad Saleem Butt. Following the election, the MQM joined the Pakistan Peoples Party-led coalition government in Azad Kashmir. However, the party's electoral influence subsequently declined, and it failed to secure representation in later AJK elections.

=== Post split election campaigns ===
In 2017, MQM took part in local bodies by election from Union Committee 46 in Hyderabad, which was vacated by the death of its counsellor, as independent candidate. in that election, the MQM-London supported independent candidate Asif Baig, who had defeated the candidate of MQM-Pakistan by a healthy margin.

== Controversies ==
MQM's Party leadership faced widespread arrests after Altaf Hussain's controversial speech and later attack on ARY channel which faced much criticism from the media and government where he had said: 'Pakistan Murdabad' (Death to Pakistan) and later ordered attack on an ARY channel office which faced much criticism from the media and government. In this speech, he also incited the party workers to attack Pakistani media houses, which resulted in street rioting and one death in Karachi. On the orders of Chief of Army Staff General Raheel Sharif, paramilitary forces immediately sealed MQM offices including Nine Zero. MQM's deputy governor Shahid Pasha, parliamentary leader Farooq Sattar, Sindh assembly opposition leader Izhar-ul-hadan and Rabita Committee members Qamar Mansur, and Member National Assembly and ex Hyderabad Mayor Kanwar Naveed Jameel were arrested. Farooq Sattar who was released shortly, later disassociated himself from MQM founder and leader Altaf Hussain saying his statements were unacceptable and later presented and facilitated resolutions in Federal and provincial assemblies against his controversial speech, Farooq also claimed to strip MQM chief from constitution and powers. The crackdown against MQM took a rapid turn when over hundred MQM Unit and Sector offices had been demolished and many MQM workers rounded up.

On August 21, 2016, according to Election Commission of Pakistan, Nadeem Nusrat and not Farooq Sattar, was the leader of MQM. According to Nadeem Nusrat, the "Minus Altaf formula" was not acceptable.

In 2016, MQM-Pakistan's leadership in the Sindh Assembly declared that it wanted MQM-London's leader Altaf Hussain tried for high treason and also removed Nadeem Nusrat, the second-in-command to head of all the affairs of the MQM in London along with Wasay Jaleel, Mustafa Azizabadi etc.

On 22 September 2016, MQM convenor Nadeem Nusrat termed the moves of Farooq Sattar against party rules and illegal and emphasized he was an elected governor and dissolved entire party infrastructure including Rabita Committee and ordered mass resignation of MQM parliamentarians from assemblies and to contest new elections on their own.

In 2017, it was reported that Nusrat had parted ways with MQM London which was later confirmed in May 2018 by MQM's London based leadership.

In a media conference the spokesman for the United States State Department, John Kirby, stated that US was aware of the arrests of the MQM leaders and was closely monitoring the events.

=== Naming controversy ===
Although media refers to Muttahida Qaumi Movement as MQM-London, MQM had instructed media to use the original name Muttahida Qaumi Movement only whereas Farooq Sattar led faction had adopted the name MQM-Pakistan.

=== Karachi Baldia Town factory ===
In 2015 a private garment factory was lit on fire and the flames ignited chemicals that were stored in the factory. The Baldia Town factory inferno case took a dramatic turn on Friday 7 February 2015 when a report by the Sindh Rangers showed that the MQM was behind the deadly fire that claimed the lives of at least 258 factory workers. MQM set fire factory to take extorted money from owners.

In response, on 11 March 2015, Pakistan Rangers carried out a raid at Nine Zero, the headquarters of MQM in Karachi as well as the party’s public secretariat Khursheed Begum Memorial Hall and arrested over 100 MQM activists.

A documentary film was prepared on Factory fire named Discount workers in 2020.

== State operations against MQM ==
=== Pucca Qila Operation (26–27 May 1990) ===
The Pakka Qila Operation was launched by Sindh Police to target MQM workers in Pakka Qilla Hyderabad. Anywhere from 70–250 besieged people were killed during the operation, which carried on for 275 hours before Pakistan army troops were ordered to move in in order to stop the violence.

=== Operation Clean-up (1992–1994) ===
Operation Clean-up was started by late General Asif Nawaz after Jinnahpur conspiracy and Major Kaleem torture case. It was the single largest operation done against MQM and the years when it occurred were widely regarded as Karachi's bloodiest.

=== 1994–1996 Operation ===
During the tenure of Benazir Bhutto, interior minister General Naseerullah Babar conducted a second operation against MQM between 1994 and 1996.

Due to serious doubts over credibility of operation due to fake encounters, extrajudicial killings and rise of killings in Karachi, Benazir Bhutto's government was dismissed by the then President of Pakistan, Farooq Ahmed Laghari primarily charging the issue of Murtaza Bhutto and the killings of MQM workers.

=== 1998 Operation ===
In the aftermath of Hakeem Saeed's assassination, federal rule was imposed by Nawaz Sharif in Sindh and an operation was initiated against MQM.

=== Karachi targeted action (2012 & 2013–2017) ===
Due to rise in targeted killing, organised crimes of extortion, kidnapping for ransom and the increased crime rate of the city, the Nawaz Sharif government initiated the Karachi operation in 2013 with the intention of creating peace in the city. Even though the interior minister Chaudhry Nisar claimed that the intentions of the operation were apolitical, there had been claims of systematic crackdowns against MQM.

=== 2015–16 Nine Zero Raids ===
Due to MQM involvement behind the deadly fire that claimed the lives of at least 258 factory workers in order to take extorted money from owners, in 2015 MQM's Headquarters, Nine Zero, was raided twice by the paramilitary Rangers and many top officials of MQM were taken into custody.On 11 March 2015, Pakistan Rangers carried out a raid at Nine Zero, the headquarters of MQM in Karachi as well as the party’s public secretariat Khursheed Begum Memorial Hall and arrested over 100 MQM activists. At least 27 suspects were presented before an anti-terrorism court. Rangers claimed that they apprehended nearly half a dozen target killers – including Faisal Mehmood, aka 'Faisal Mota', who was sentenced to death in the murder case of Geo News journalist Wali Khan Babar in 2011 and a huge quantity of arms and ammunition, walkie talkies, binoculars and other military gear used by NATO forces in Afghanistan were also seized during the raid.

After Altaf Hussain's controversial speech where he had said: 'Pakistan Murdabad' (Death to Pakistan) and later ordered attack on an ARY channel office which faced much criticism from the media and government. In this speech, he also incited the party workers to attack Pakistani media houses, which resulted in street rioting and one death in Karachi. On the orders of Chief of Army Staff, General Raheel Sharif, the paramilitary Sindh Rangers immediately raided sealed multiple MQM offices including Nine Zero. On August 22, 2016, the Headquarter was sealed and hundreds of MQM offices were bulldozed. This 2016 Rangers raid turned out to be a turning point for MQM party or some people call it a beginning of the MQM's end as a political party.

==== Aftermath of the raids ====
The 2016 Nine Zero raid was referred to as "the end of the story for the party founder, Altaf Hussain". A section of political analysts believed that the situation had already started worsening for MQM when London's Metropolitan Police arrested and detained Altaf Hussain, the party founder, in 2014 for an investigation involving money laundering, which dispelled the impression that he was untouchable and safe in Britain, despite the charges ultimately being dropped due to a lack of evidence.

In 2015, a senior policeman, had placed the figure of deaths of MQM workers at 1,000, saying a majority of the deaths were extrajudicial killings. Three other serving officials confirmed the assessment. In 2015, the HRCP expressed concern over the rise in extrajudicial killings and lack of transparency about the number of MQM activists picked up or later let off.

During Nine Zero raid, MQM worker Waqas Shah was shot by a Ranger's 9mm pistol fire from point blank range. The video evidence released on electronic media confirmed the incident. Farooq Sattar's coordination officer Syed Aftab Ahmed was killed while in the custody of paramilitary forces. Initially the force denied torture and stated that he died of heart attack but it had to accept after social media publicized videos of torture marks on Aftab's body and autopsy report conforming death due to torture. During the second raid on Nine Zero, “Don’t misbehave with the women” were said to be the 25-year-old Syed Waqas Ali Shah's last words to Rangers personnel, who, according to eye-witnesses accounts were pushing aside women who were protesting outside the MQM headquarters (Nine Zero) against the operation.

As a result of operation, MQM claimed 67 of its workers had been killed by the Sindh Rangers while 150 went missing and more than 5,000 were placed behind bars.

=== Human rights violations by the state ===
Targeted action between 1994 and 1996 saw gross human rights violations by the state organizations and by Law enforcement which included randomly kidnapping, extrajudicial executions, disappearance, torture, fake conspiracies, etc.

The speeches and images of Altaf Hussain had been banned by the decision of former Lahore High Court's Chief of Justice and Anti-Terrorism courts had issued arrest warrants of Altaf Hussain numerous times.

Journalists said that targeted operations were only against MQM.

During the 2015 Nine Zero raid, MQM worker Waqas Shah was shot by a Ranger's 9 mm pistol from point blank range. The video evidence released on electronic media confirmed the incident.

Farooq Sattar's coordination officer Syed Aftab Ahmed was killed while in the custody of the paramilitary Sindh Rangers. Initially the Rangers denied torture and stated that he died of a heart attack, but had to accept after social media publicized videos of torture marks on Aftab's body and an autopsy report confirming death due to torture.

As a result of the operation, MQM claimed that 67 of its workers had been killed by the Sindh Rangers, while 150 were missing and more than 5,000 were imprisoned. Amnesty International, the US State Department, and the United Nations Human Rights Commission had published multiple documents expressing concerns over alleged human rights violations during the targeted operation against MQM.

== Later developments and dissolution of the party ==
=== Altaf Hussain's August 2025 announcement ===
On 12 August 2025, Altaf Hussain, founder of Muttahida Qaumi Movement–London, addressed a global gathering of MQM workers via video link and declared that he was "relieving all party workers of their oath of allegiance to him". He stated:

"For the past 47 years, I have been struggling for the rights of Pakistan’s deprived and oppressed people, especially the Muhajir community. I have worked day and night without a single day off. In this struggle, we have endured the martyrdom of thousands of colleagues, enforced disappearances, displacement, destruction of homes, forced occupation of properties, and countless other sacrifices. My own family have not been spared either. My 28-year-old nephew, Arif Hussain, was hacked to death with an axe. My 70-year-old brother-in-law, Aslam Ibrahmani, was arrested from Karachi, brutally tortured for six months in Adiala jail, and dumped outside in a near-dead state, before he succumbed to his injuries. None of my siblings escaped the ordeal of repeated raids on their homes, forcing them into exile, Despite the martyrdom of thousands of comrades, the anguish of thousands of disappeared colleagues, and the imprisonment of many — including those still in jail — I have concluded that I have failed not only to change Pakistan’s rotten and outdated system, but also to secure the rights of my Muhajir nation. Therefore, from August 10, 2025, I relieve all comrades, including the former coordination committee, convener, deputy convener, and all workers, from the oath of loyalty they took to the movement and to me. They were now free to join any political party they wish, wherever they wish, and wherever they wish. As long as I live, I will continue the movement to achieve rights through social media. Success or failure was in the hands of God."

Hussain recounted past sacrifices, including the enforced disappearance and killing of his brother and nephew.

=== Interpretation as party dissolution ===
Commentators and media outlets widely interpreted the statement as effectively signalling the dissolution of MQM–London as a political organization, owing to the removal of its foundational loyalty structure. The party had always been a top-down organizational structure, the removal of which led many to believe that the party had effectively dissolved and ceased to exist.
