= 2015 Sindh local government elections =

Pakistani provincial elections

All local government seats in Sindh
Leader	Muttahida Qaumi Movement (MQM)	Pakistan Peoples Party (PPP)	Jamaat-e-Islami (JI)
Seats won	1,117	900	287
Result before election
Pakistan Peoples Party (PPP)
PPP
Elected Result
Muttahida Qaumi Movement (MQM)
MQM

The 2015 Sindh local government elections were held in the province of Sindh, Pakistan, on 26 May 2015. The elections were held for the first time in 12 years and were the first to be held under the Local Government Act 2013.

The Muttahida Qaumi Movement (MQM) won the most seats in the elections, followed by the Pakistan Peoples Party (PPP) and the Jamaat-e-Islami (JI). The MQM won 1,117 seats, the PPP won 900 seats, and the JI won 287 seats.

== Background ==
The last local government elections in Sindh were held in 2001. The elections were won by the PPP, which formed the government in the province. The MQM was the main opposition party.

In 2013, the PPP government passed the Local Government Act 2013. The act was designed to devolve power to the local level and to improve governance in Sindh.

The 2015 Sindh local government elections were held under the Local Government Act 2013. The elections were the first to be held under the act.

== Results ==
The MQM won the most seats in the elections, followed by the PPP and the JI. The MQM won 1,117 seats, the PPP won 900 seats, and the JI won 287 seats.
