= Nine Zero =

Former office headquarters address of MQM London

- نائن زیرو

General information
- Status: Demolished
- Location: Azizabad, Karachi, Pakistan
- Grounds: 120 square yards (1080 sq ft.)
- Known for: Headquarters of the MQM-L

Nine Zero (نائن زیرو) was the name given to the headquarters of Pakistan's political party, MQM-L founded in 1984. It was located in Azizabad, a sub-division of Federal B. Area, Karachi.

The house was constructed on a 120 square yards (1080 sq ft.) plot, belonging to the family of the MQM founder, Altaf Hussain, as he lived in house #494/8, Block 8 in Azizabad, Karachi-75950 (near "Liaqut Ali Khan Chowk"). After some years and many political and social developments – Nine Zero gained a reputation of a famed and long-feared headquarters of the MQM political party.

It had now become the center of MQM's political and social activities. Altaf Hussain frequently delivered his speeches there by video or tele-conferencing in order to communicate with the workers of the political party. It was also the main centre of MQM political party in Karachi and was an important location for political meetings & discussions.

MQM Headquarter "Nine Zero" was named that way by the last two digits "90" of its then phone number, not the plot or house number.

== Nine Zero raids ==
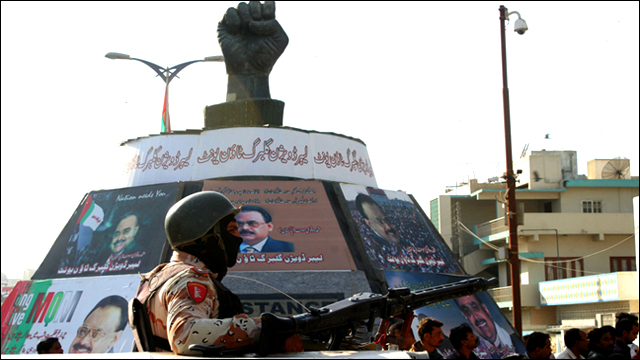
Pakistan Rangers at Liaqut Ali Khan Chowk in 2015 when MQM's headquarters Nine Zero were getting raided

Due to MQM involvement behind the deadly fire that claimed the lives of at least 258 factory workers in order to take extorted money from owners, in 2015 MQM's Headquarter Nine Zero was raided twice by the paramilitary Sindh Rangers and many top officials of MQM were taken into custody. On 11 March 2015, Pakistan Rangers carried out a raid at Nine Zero, the headquarters of MQM in Karachi as well as the party’s public secretariat Khursheed Begum Memorial Hall and arrested over 100 MQM activists.

At least 27 suspects were presented before an anti-terrorism court. Rangers claimed that they apprehended nearly half a dozen target killers – including Faisal Mehmood, aka 'Faisal Mota', who was sentenced to death in the murder case of Geo News journalist Wali Khan Babar in 2011 and a huge quantity of arms and ammunition, walkie talkies, binoculars and other military gear used by NATO forces in Afghanistan were also seized during the raid.

Nine Zero was sealed on 23 August 2016 by the Pakistan Rangers following a hate speech delivered by MQM's leader, Altaf Hussain where he said: 'Pakistan Murdabad' (Death to Pakistan) and later the attack on ARY channel which faced much criticism from the media. In this speech, he incited the party workers to attack Pakistani media houses, which resulted in street rioting and one death in Karachi. On the orders of Chief of Army Staff, General Raheel Sharif, the paramilitary Sindh Rangers immediately raided sealed multiple MQM offices including Nine Zero. On August 22, 2016, the Headquarters was sealed and hundreds of MQM offices were bulldozed.

=== Aftermath ===
This 2016 Rangers raid turned out to be a turning point for MQM party or some people call it a beginning of the MQM's end as a political party. The 2016 Nine Zero raid was referred to as "the end of the story for the party founder, Altaf Hussain".

A section of political analysts believe that the situation had already started worsening against the MQM, when London's Metropolitan Police arrested and detained Altaf Hussain, the party founder, in 2014 on charges of Money laundering. The investigation washed away the impression that he was untouchable and safe in Britain despite it being dropped due to a lack of evidence.

Later many leaders of MQM were arrested by Sindh Rangers for investigation. Since this 2015-2016 raids, many surprising and sudden developments led to the splitting of the MQM into many factions. A group of former MQM people had formed a new party called Pak Sarzameen Party under the leadership of Syed Mustafa Kamal and Anis Kaimkhani. Another group of former MQM people had formed a new party called Muttahida Qaumi Movement – Pakistan, under the leadership of Farooq Sattar, Nasreen Jalil, and Amir Khan.

For the first time in its 30-year history, MQM had suffered a humiliating defeat in the 2018 Pakistani general election.
