= Kaleem =

Kaleemtanha

Kaleem is a given name and surname of Arabic origin. Notable people with the name include:

== Given name ==
- Kaleem Barreto (born 1998), Scottish rugby union player
- Kaleem Haitham (born 1998), English professional footballer
- Kaleem Ullah Khan (horticulturist), Indian horticulturist and fruit breeder
- Kaleem Omar (1937–2009), Pakistani journalist and English language poet
- Kaleem Saadat (born 1951), retired air force general in the Pakistan Air Force and Chief of Air Staff
- Kaleem Shah (entrepreneur) (born 1962), American entrepreneur, computer engineer and owner of Thoroughbred race horses
- Kaleem Shaukat, three-star rank admiral in the Pakistan Navy, Vice-Chief of Naval Staff since 2017
- Kaleem Taylor, British singer

== Surname ==
- Aamir Kaleem (born 1981), Omani cricketer
- Mazhar Kaleem (1942–2018), Pakistani novelist known for his Imran Series novels
- Muhammad Burhan (born 1985), Emirati cricketer
- Musa Kaleem (1921–1988), American jazz saxophonist and flautist
- Pervaiz Kaleem (born 1949), Pakistani screenwriter and film director

== See also ==
- Khawaja Kaleem Ahmed or Dawn (newspaper), Pakistan's oldest, leading and most widely read English-language newspaper
- Major Kaleem Case, the bedrock of many Pakistani governmental and military operations against the Muttahida Qaumi Movement, namely Operation Clean-up
