= Nadeem Ehsan =

Pakistani politician

Member of the National Assembly of Pakistan
- In office February 2008 – December 2012
- Constituency: Constituency NA-247 (Karachi-IX)

Minister of State for Overseas Pakistani
- In office May 2011 – December 2012
- Prime Minister: Yusuf Raza Gillani; Raja Pervaiz Ashraf

Personal details
- Party: PTI (2025-present)
- Other political affiliations: MQM-L (2008-2012)

Nadeem Ehsan is a Pakistani politician who was a member of the National Assembly of Pakistan from February 2008 to December 2012, and the Minister of State for Overseas Pakistani from May 2011 to December 2012.

== Political career ==
Ehsan fled Pakistan during Operation Clean-up and returned to Pakistan in 2008.

He was elected to the National Assembly of Pakistan as a candidate of Muttahida Qaumi Movement from Constituency NA-247 (Karachi-IX) in the 2008 Pakistani general election.

In May 2011, Ehsan was inducted into the federal cabinet of Prime Minister Yousaf Raza Gillani and was made Minister of State for Overseas Pakistani. In June 2012, he was inducted into the federal cabinet of Prime Minister Raja Pervaiz Ashraf and was re-appointed as Minister of State for Overseas Pakistani.

He resigned from his National Assembly seat in December 2012 due to having dual nationality.
