= Major Kaleem Case =

During sectarian violence in Pakistan, the Major Kaleem Case was the bedrock of many Pakistani governmental and military operations against the Muttahida Qaumi Movement, especially Operation Clean-up. Several MQM leaders and workers were alleged to have been involved in the kidnapping and torture of Pakistan Army Major Kaleem in 1991.

On 6 February 1998, the Sindh High Court found all defendants innocent and found the case as one "of almost no legal evidence". However, on February 20, 1998, Major Kaleem appealed the decision to the Supreme Court and contended that "the High Court erred by acquitting the accused who did not surrender themselves before the trial court. He argued that there was sufficient evidence against the respondents to prove their guilt." On 13 August 2007, the Sindh government withdrew its appeal and all charges against the accused were dismissed.
