= Operation Clean-up =

Pakistani anti-crime operation

- Part of MQM Militancy
- Prime minister Nawaz Sharif along with Chief of Army Staff General Asif Nawaz and V Corps GOC-in-Chief Lieutenant General Naseer Akhtar visiting General Headquarters (GHQ) to get briefing on 19th June of 1992 Operation preparations.
- Operational scope: Cleansing of the city of "anti-social" elements.
- Type: Military operation, Military intelligence, Counterinsurgency, Counterterrorism
- Location: Karachi, Sindh, Pakistan
- Planned by: Pakistan Army, Intelligence Bureau, and FIA
- Target: MQM-A
- Objective: Cleansing of the city of "anti-social" elements.
- Date: 19 June 1992 − 16 August 1994 (2 years, 1 month and 4 weeks) (UTC+05:00 PKT)
- Executed by: Pakistan Rangers; Sindh Rangers; Pakistan Police; Sindh Police
- Outcome: Sindh government victory.: MQM-Altaf and MQM-Haqiqi weakened; Law and order restored; Crime rate of Karachi significantly reduced

Operation Clean-up, also known as Operation Blue Fox, was initially planned against 72 big terrorists or mafias present in interior(rural) Sindh but later was diverted towards MQM led by Mr Altaf Hussain to malign the rising popularity and his political strength growing all across the country.Was an armed intelligence program and anti-crime operation led by the Sindh Police and Sindh Rangers, with some support from the Pakistan Army and its related-intelligence agencies. It was planned by the FIA, Intelligence Bureau, army and launched the directives of Prime Minister Nawaz Sharif in 1992. The program was more strictly pursued by upcoming Prime Minister Benazir Bhutto in 1993–1994, as part of her internal policies. Its objective was to cleanse Karachi city of anti-social elements as well as reduce crime such as street crime and gang warfare. The program targeted the Muhajir Qaumi Movement (Altaf) and benifited the Mohajir Qaumi Movement (Haqiqi) over the controversy regarding the alleged plan on having the cities of Karachi and Hyderabad break away from the province of Sindh and be a separate country known as Jinnahpur.

== Background ==
=== Political dynamics in 1980s ===
The Muttahida Qaumi Movement (denoted as MQM) is a centre-left and liberal political party which was founded in 1984 by its activist leader, Altaf Hussain who was a student at the University of Karachi in the 1970s. According to the memoirs of General Mirza Beg, the MQM had its support from President General Zia-ul-Haq since its very early foundation in 1984, in a view to sideline the Jamaat-e-Islami Pakistan in Karachi and Pakistan Peoples Party in rural Sindh. Such claims had been dismissed by MQM's former convener Imran Farooq. MQM took part in local government elections and participated well in 1985 general elections, initially becoming part of military–technocratic government of President General Zia-ul-Haq. After death of President Zia-ul-Haq, MQM contested in 1988 general elections, acquiring considerable political leverage with 13 seats in parliament. MQM was part of PPP-led government of Benazir Bhutto but its repressive persuasion of repatriation of Biharis from Bangladesh camps soured the relations between each other. MQM went on to support the "vote of no confidence" against Benazir Bhutto which took the incumbency by surprise. As early as 1988–89, the political problems in Karachi began to arise and reached its climax in 1990 when the Sindh Police opened fire on Muhajir protesters (mostly women and children) outside Hyderabad city in Pakka Killa. The ensuing violence led to the events dismissing Benazir Bhutto from the office.

After coming in power as a result of 1990 general elections, the MQM re-demonstrated its political power in Sindh as part of the IDA government led by Nawaz Sharif. During this time, violence arose with the disagreements between one faction led by Afaq Ahmed and Altaf Hussain of MQM. MQM was later subdued by Nawaz Sharif in 1991 due to a brief clash of ideology.

Since its founding, the Muhajir Qaumi Movement (MQM) and its student wing, the All Pakistan Muhajir Students Organization (APMSO), had engaged in a bitter rivalry with Jamaat-e-Islami Pakistan (JIP) and its student wing, Islami Jamiat-e-Talaba (IJT), with bloody confrontations on university campuses and turf wars later on involving street fighting, gang warfare and urban warfare. Additionally, MQM was accused of operating as a mafia organization where its heavily armed militants used extortion and coercion to increase their influence.

== Planning an operation in Karachi ==
In 1992, a program's studies for an operation led by the Rangers in Karachi were concluded under the Director-General of the Intelligence Bureau, Brigadier (retired) Imtiaz Ahmed as codename: Operation Clean-up, recommending the protocol. On personal initiatives of Prime Minister Nawaz Sharif, Clean-up protocol was initiated under Imtiaz Ahmed and the Pakistan Rangers, focusing on taking measures against the decoits in rural Sindh, not specific to political parties. According to the sources, the program's protocol was to last six months, deadline was until June 1992.

== Operation ==
The program went in cold storage after Sharif was dismissed but again came in effect and revival after the 1993 general elections which saw Benazir Bhutto coming in power and MQM winning the provisional elections decisively. The proposal was put forward and Benazir Bhutto renamed the program's protocol as "Blue Fox" in 1993 and more aggressively persuade with the program. Among the reasons given for the launching of the Blue Fox were the Jinnahpur affair and the Major Kaleem Case in Karachi that occurred in 1993. The street fighting with the Pakistan People's Party continued in rural Karachi with the PPP's controversial decision of forming of Malir District in 1994.

=== Continuation of the operation ===
After the Nawaz government fell, the anti-MQM operation continued into the new Benazir Bhutto government. The army recognised that the program's protocol actually took place during the Government of Prime Minister Benazir Bhutto. The diameter and focus of the program was widened to Pakistan Armed Forces when the idea of the 25th Mechanized Division of V Corps (for support) and the internal wing of the ISI (on intelligence) was invited by Benazir Bhutto. The Rangers' search and destroy operation led to the discovery of arm caches and torture chambers in elsewhere in Karachi. The gun battles, urban warefare and street fighting in Karachi increased the Muhajir-Sindhi violence. Lieutenant-General Naseer Akhtar and Major-General Safdar Ali Khan, assisting Brigadier Imtiaz Ahmed, directly reported to the government on the course of actions. In December 1993, Defence minister Aftab Mirani maintained that the Ranger operation in Sindh "will continue as long as it is needed." In a press release in January 1994, Interior Minister, Naseerullah Babar, added in that "Operation Clean-Up" was likely to continue until June.

During its final phases on 19 May 1994, Prime minister Benazir Bhutto chaired a meeting with Chief minister of Sindh Abdullah Shah, Interior minister Naseerullah Babar, chief of army staff General Waheed Kakar and other key civilian and military officials at General Headquarters (GHQ), to decide on the modalities of Operation Clean-up in Sindh; the operation was to be carried out by the Pakistan Rangers, more specifically, the Sindh Rangers with some support from the Army.

== Halt and Aftermath ==
Ending in 1994, the period is regarded as the bloodiest period in Karachi's history, with thousands killed or gone missing in the fighting. In May 1995, arm clashes again broke out between the MQM and the Sindh Police, which was managed by the ruling PPP. Benazir Bhutto's steps towards the counterinsurgency did, however, bring some calm in Karachi by the spring of 1996. Over this issue, Murtaza Bhutto was notably gunned down in a police encounter with the Sindh Police. Within seven-weeks, President Farooq Leghari dismissed the government of Benazir Bhutto, primarily charging the issue of Murtaza Bhutto and the killings of MQM workers. Furthermore, the program came to its final halt in ending months of 1996 after the dismissal of Benazir Bhutto's government. MQM again participated well in 1997 general elections and re-demonstrated its political leverage in the parliament.

== Legacy ==
Although 32 years to 34 years have passed since the arrests or disappearance of MQM workers, families of the missing people have registered cases in the Supreme Court of Pakistan and are still searching for their loved ones.

== See also ==
- MQM Militancy
- MQM insurrection (1994–2016)
- Jinnahpur
- Insurgency in Sindh
- Operation Lyari
- Pucca Qila Massacre
