= Imran Farooq =

British-Pakistani politician

Member of the National Assembly of Pakistan
- In office 30 November 1988 – 6 August 1990
- Constituency: NA-187 (Karachi Central-II)

Personal details
- Born: 14 June 1960 Karachi, Pakistan
- Died: 16 September 2010 (aged 50) Edgware, London, England
- Cause of death: Assassination by stabbing
- Party: MQM (1992-2010)
- Spouse: Shumaila Nazar
- Children: 2
- Parent(s): Mohammad Farooq Ahmed and Raisa Farooq
- Occupation: Physician, politician
- Website: drimranfarooq.org

Imran Farooq (Urdu: عمران فاروق; 14 June 1960 – 16 September 2010) was a British-Pakistani politician best known senior role in the Muttahida Qaumi Movement (MQM), a political party in Pakistan. As a founding member of the All Pakistan Muhajir Student Organization, Farooq held various significant positions within MQM and the Pakistani government. From 1999 until his assassination, he lived in self-imposed exile in London.

== Early and personal life ==
Imran Farooq was born in Karachi, Pakistan. His father, Farooq Ahmed, originally from Delhi, British India (now India), migrated to Pakistan after its independence 1947 and was later elected as a Member of the National Assembly of Pakistan. Farooq himself was a physician, graduating with an MBBS degree from Sindh Medical College in Karachi in 1985. In 2004, he married Shumaila Nazar, a former member of the Sindh Assembly. The couple had two children. Farooq was related to Tahir Qureshi, a former MPA, and his great-grandfather once served as the governor of Delhi.

In 2019, several news agencies reported that Shumaila Farooq was living in extreme poverty with her two sons, relying on handouts from the British government. In 2020, on a Geo News talk show, she revealed that she was diagnosed with Stage 2 Oral Cancer in 2019 and that none of the leaders of MQM reached out for help.

== Mohajir Quami Movement ==
In 1978, Farooq helped established the All Pakistan Muhajir Student Organization. When in 1984, it gave birth to the Mohajir Quami Movement (MQM), Farooq served as its first Secretary General and Convener. In 1988, he was elected to the Pakistan National Assembly and became the Parliamentary Leader of the MQM.

By 1992, the MQM had become a political force in Karachi. In an effort to curtail its power, the Pakistani government launched Operation Clean-up and sent the military into Karachi to crack down on the movement, causing the leadership, including Farooq, to go into hiding. After being in hiding for nearly seven years, Farooq escaped from Pakistan in 1999, sought political asylum in the United Kingdom and later gained British citizenship. From London, Farooq continued to lead the MQM with Altaf Hussain and other senior members of the party from exile. When Farooq left Pakistan, he had a bounty on his head. Farooq was charged with terrorism, which he denied upon arrival in London. The charges against Farooq were challenged by his mother in 1992 in the Sindh High Court (SHC). The SHC's verdict declared the bounty to be illegal and unconstitutional; the consequent appeal by the provincial Government of Sindh was dismissed by the Supreme Court.

Farooq maintained close relations with Altaf Hussain, who called Farooq his "staunch, loyal, and senior companion." In 2004, when Farooq got married in London, Hussain attended the festivities.

== Death ==
Farooq was found murdered near his home in North London on 16 September 2010. The murder took place at 5:30 p.m. as Farooq was returning home after finishing work at a local pharmacy.

=== Investigation ===
The Metropolitan Police said they were called on the complaint of a "serious assault" in Green Lane, Edgware, where they found Farooq, who had suffered multiple stab wounds and head injuries. Despite the efforts of paramedics, Farooq was pronounced dead. An autopsy determined the cause of death as being head trauma and stab wounds to the neck. The suspect(s) had fled the scene leaving behind a 14 cm (5 in) knife and a house brick used to commit the crime.

An unidentified suspect was arrested in December 2010.

Metropolitan Police Service (MPS) Counter Terrorism Command detectives investigating Farooq's murder believe that he was building his independent political profile in the months before he was killed.

In June 2013, British police arrested Iftikhar Hussain, a primary suspect in the murder case. According to sources familiar with the developments, the detainee is a relative of a top Pakistani politician. The arrest was made in response to forensic evidence gathered by the police. The Scotland Yard stated that they had sought the Call Detail Record (CDR) along with text messages from the SIM obtained from Hussain.

According to sources privy to the development at Scotland Yard, the information obtained from the SIM of Iftikhar Hussain has brought previously unknown facts and connections into the limelight. According to the Yard, the killing may be politically motivated with the secondary objective of money-laundering. However, the police refrained from disclosing the information as the investigation is currently ongoing.

A prominent Pakistan journalist, Najam Sethi, in his programme Apas ki Baat, stated that Farooq had registered a complaint against threat to life with the London Metropolitan Police prior to his murder.

Major suspect of the murder case, Khalid Shamim, confessed on 10 November 2016 that all the planning of murder took place on Nine Zero. He revealed that 16 September was chosen as the date to murder as a birthday gift to Altaf Hussain.

On 18 June 2020, ten years since his murder, an anti-terrorism court of Islamabad convicted the three accused namely: Syed Mohsin Ali, Moazzam Ali and Khalid Shamim. They were sentenced to life imprisonment and were also imposed a fine of Rs 1.2 million each for the murder.

=== Reactions ===
Pakistani President Asif Ali Zardari expressed his deep sorrow and shock saying that "Imran was a great political leader who rendered his services for his party diligently." Prime Minister Yousaf Raza Gilani called the MQM leader Altaf Hussain to offer his condolences and said Farooq's death was a great loss for MQM. The Pakistani Senate adjourned a session of parliament and paid tribute to Farooq from across the political spectrum. Pakistan's High Commissioner to the United Kingdom Wajid Shamsul Hasan called on the police to find the "sinister hand" behind the assassination. He added that "The Pakistani government has condemned this murder in the strongest possible words, "that Farooq "was really highly respected by whatever political groups...He believed more in solutions to problems than creating problems and his assassination needs to be condemned in the strongest possible way because he was not a violent person."

Altaf Hussain also lauded Farooq's long relationship with him and said he was at a loss to explain his grief at Dr. Farooq's death, adding that Farooq had set an example for others to follow. He also called Farooq a "Shaheed-e-Inqalab" or Martyr of the Revolution. Altaf Hussain also very publicly mourned the death of his colleague.

Following reports of his death, violence erupted in his native city of Karachi, Pakistan's main commercial city. Several shops and vehicles were set on fire; however, no casualties were reported. MQM called for a 10-day strike to mourn Farooq's death.

Recitations of the Quran and prayers were organised by members of MQM across the world.

== Published works ==
Farooq authored several works during his lifetime. His best known contribution is The Guiding Principles of MQM.
