= Raheel Sharif =

9th Chief of Army Staff of Pakistan

Raheel Sharif NI(M) HI(M)
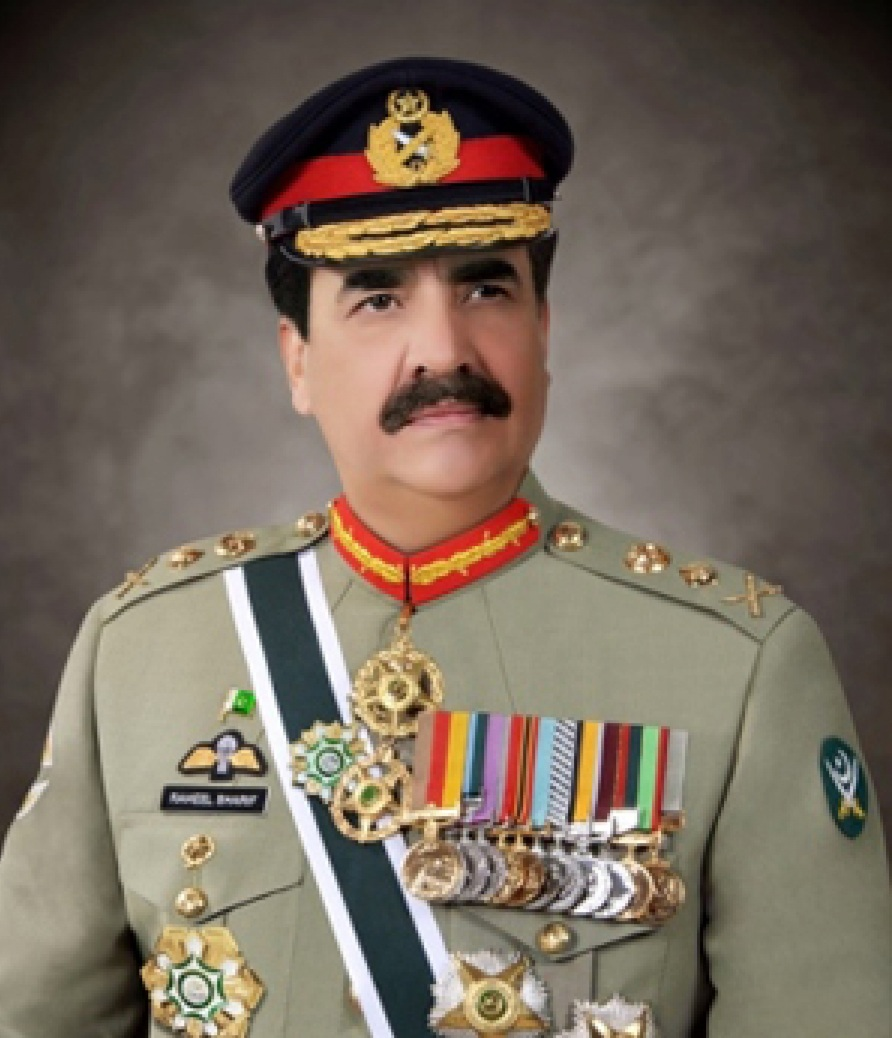
- Official military portrait, 2013
- Born: 16 June 1956 (age 70); Quetta, West Pakistan, Pakistan
- Education: Government College Lahore; Pakistan Military Academy; National Defense University
- Relatives: Raja Aziz Bhatti (uncle); Shabbir Sharif (brother)
- Military career
- Allegiance: Pakistan
- Branch: Pakistan Army
- Service years: 1976–2016
- Rank: General
- Unit: 6th FF Regiment
- Commands: Islamic Military Alliance; Chief of Army Staff; XXX Corps; XI Division; 6 Frontier Force Regiment; 26 Frontier Force Regiment
- Conflicts: Kargil War; Insurgency in Balochistan; War in North-West Pakistan; Operation Khyber; Operation Zarb-e-Azb; 2014 Kashmir Skirmishes; Organized crime in Pakistan; Operation Zarb-e-Ahan; Nine Zero raids
- Awards: Nishan-e-Imtiaz (Military); Hilal-e-Imtiaz (Military); Order of King Abdulaziz; Legion of Merit; Order of Military Merit; Turkish Legion of Merit; Order of Military Merit

General Raheel Sharif NI(M) HI(M) (Urdu: راحیل شریف; born 16 June 1956) is a retired four-star army general of the Pakistan Army who served as the 9th Chief of Army Staff from 29 November 2013 to 29 November 2016. After his retirement as Pakistan's army chief, Raheel Sharif has been serving as the first commander of the Islamic Military Counter Terrorism Coalition, a 43-nation alliance of Muslim countries headquartered in Riyadh, Saudi Arabia since 6 January 2017.

Under General Raheel Sharif's command, the Pakistan Army carried out anti-terrorism operations across the country. The most important of these was in North Waziristan, namely Operation Zarb-e-Azb which targeted Taliban strongholds in the region. He expanded the role of paramilitaries in Karachi which is widely credited with reducing the level of violence in Pakistan's commercial capital. The Pakistani military under his command has also supported the democratically elected government on the federal level and the Baloch provincial and local government in ending the Balochistan insurgency by pursuing reconciliation and integration of former militants back into mainstream Pakistani society. General Sharif also developed a new brigade-level military unit to help protect and secure the China-Pakistan Economic Corridor which runs through Balochistan province. General Sharif helped to develop Pakistan's indigenous defence industry which resulted in the savings of more than $1.14 billion of Pakistan's forex, over a year and half time period.

General Sharif achieved his objectives by strengthening the role of the military in affairs directly concerning national security and foreign policy, while leaving the civilian government of Prime Minister Nawaz Sharif in control of social and economic policy. and reconciled Pakistan with America by striking against militant groups near the Afghan border, carrying out Pakistan's first joint military exercises with Russia, and deepening relations with China.

General Sharif left a respected legacy in Pakistan. He said that he was "ready to serve Pakistan" even after his retirement. He is widely credited with reducing terrorism inside the country; violence in the country was reduced to its lowest level since 2006, with an overall decline of 80% in terrorist attacks under his tenure.

== Early life and education ==
General Raheel Sharif was born in Quetta, capital of Pakistan's Balochistan province. He belongs to a Kashmiri family from Kunjah in Gujrat District, Punjab Province.

He has a prominent military background, and is the son of (late) Major Muhammad Sharif. He is the youngest sibling among three brothers and two sisters. His elder brother Major Shabbir Sharif (28 April 1943 – 6 December 1971) was a Pakistan Army officer who was posthumously awarded the Nishan-e-Haider during the Indo-Pakistani War of 1971. Shabbir Sharif is regarded as the highest decorated military officer of the Pakistan Army who received both the Nishan-e-Haider (1971) and Sitara-e-Jurat (1965), and received the Sword of Honour at Pakistan Military Academy upon graduation. His second brother, Captain Mumtaz Sharif, served in Pakistan Army and for his bravery in saving soldiers from a burning tank during an exercise accident, was awarded Sitara-e-Basalat, he received an early retirement due to his injuries. From his mother's side, he is related to Major Raja Aziz Bhatti, another Nishan-e-Haider recipient, who was declared as the martyr of Indo-Pakistani War of 1965 by Pakistan. Raheel Sharif is married and has four children, three sons and a daughter.

Sharif received his formal education from Garrison Boys High School, Lahore Cantt, and later on he studied from the Government College in Lahore and afterward attended the 54th long course (L/C) of Pakistan Military Academy (PMA).

== Military career ==
=== Early career ===
After his passing-out in October 1976, he was commissioned into the 6th Battalion of the Frontier Force Regiment, where his elder brother had also served. He served as an adjutant to the Pakistan Military Academy and joined an infantry brigade in Gilgit.

=== Command, field and staff roles ===
He has the distinction of commanding two infantry units, 6FF and 26FF as a Lt. Colonel and also as an Acting Brigade Commander in Sialkot during 1999 Kargil War. During the Army monitoring of 2000 he was given control of Gujranwala district and is credited for bringing substantial administrative and social reforms to the area. As a Brigadier, he commanded two infantry brigades. In 2001, he was appointed Chief of Staff of 30 Corps Gujranwala. He was later posted as Chief of Staff at Corps Headquarters Quetta, Balochistan.

=== Higher command and staff positions ===
In 2004 he was selected to join the prestigious Royal College of Defence Studies, UK where he graduated with distinction.

In 2005 he was promoted to the rank of Major General and assigned command of the coveted 11th Infantry Division in Lahore. After commanding the division for over two years, he was posted as Commandant of the Pakistan Military Academy, Kakul. Following his promotion to Lieutenant General, Sharif served as a Corps Commander Gujranwala and then as the Inspector General for Training and Evaluation of the Pakistan Army before becoming the 9th Chief of Army Staff of Pakistan.

==== Role in Counter-Terrorism ====
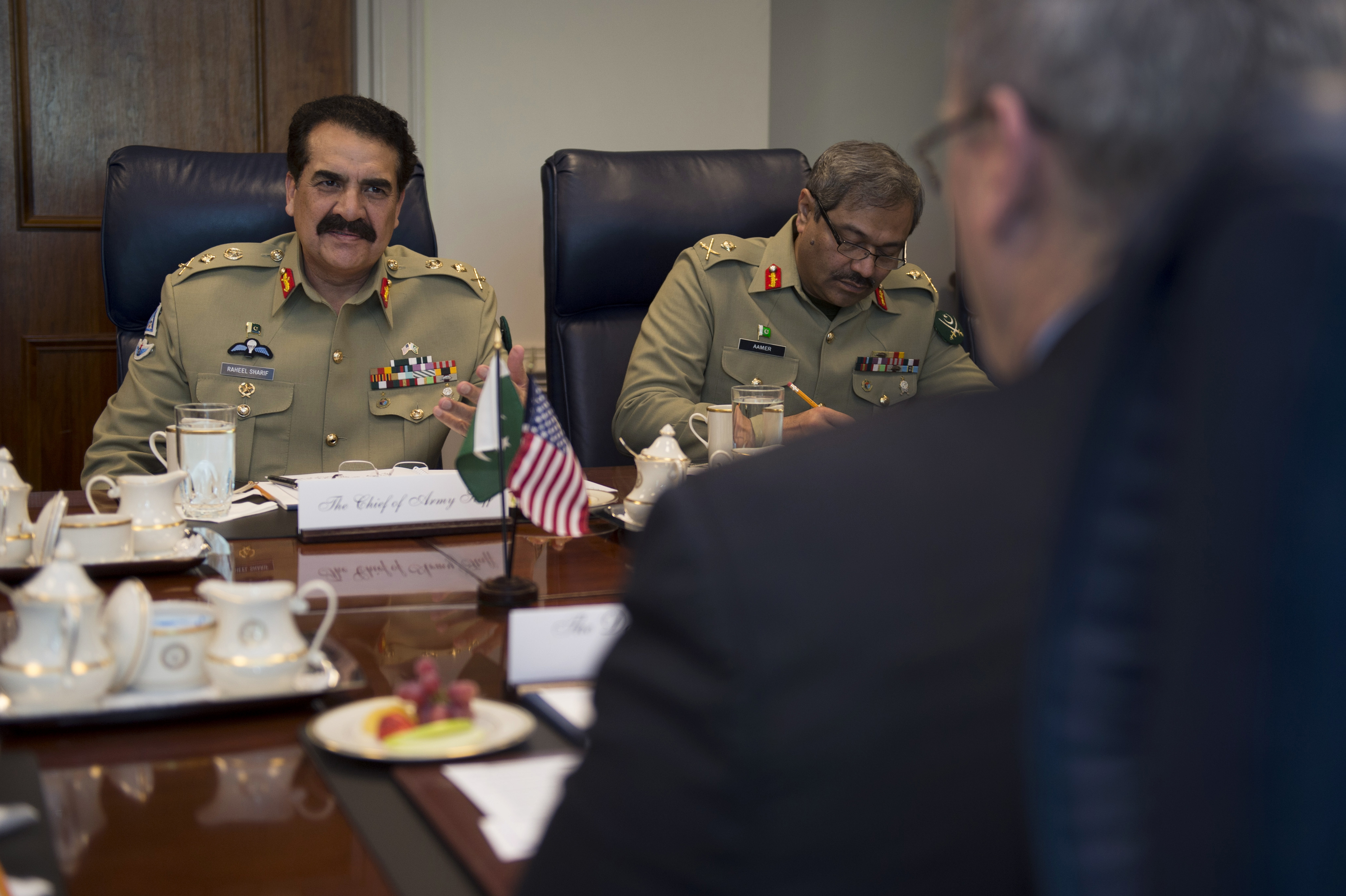
General Raheel Shareef with Bob Work in 2014

As the Inspector General for Training and Evaluation, he enhanced the military colleges in the country and provided unconventional warfare training to the troops. He also dealt with the evaluation of military doctrines and war strategies with a view to shaping future training programs. He changed the army's focus more towards carrying out counter-insurgency operations against Tehrik-i-Taliban (Pakistani Taliban) militants.

General Sharif has spearheaded a thinking in Pakistan military since 2007 that fighting Taliban inside Pakistan is more important than focusing on India, Pakistan's main rival since independence.

== Chief of Army Staff ==
On 27 November 2013, Sharif was appointed the 9th Chief of Army Staff of the Pakistan Army by Prime Minister Nawaz Sharif.

In 2013, Sharif was conferred with Nishan-e-Imtiaz (military). He has the distinction of being conferred with 5 international military awards, highest for any Pakistani Army Chief till date, in recognition of his outstanding leadership in the fight against terrorism and bringing stability to the region. General Raheel Sharif retired as the Chief of Army Staff on 29 November 2016.

=== Karachi Operation ===
General Raheel Sharif launched Karachi Operation in 2013 with the stated goal of preventing political and criminal gang conflicts. Karachi, which had been ranked the sixth most dangerous city in the world in 2013, dropped off the list of the 100 most dangerous cities in 2017.

== Post-retirement ==
=== Islamic Military Counter Terrorism Coalition ===
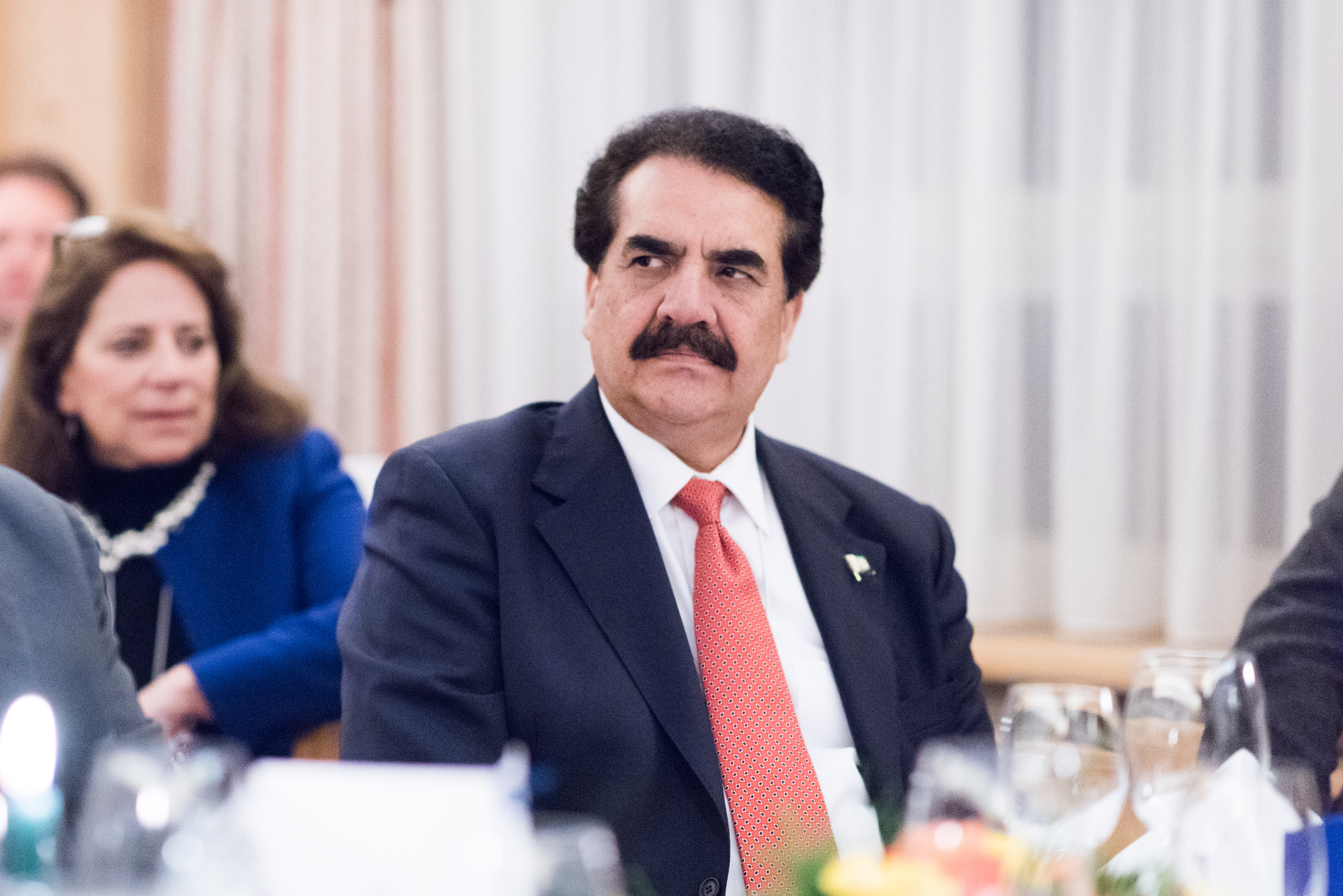
Sharif at the Global Security Dinner Davos in 2017

In April 2017, Raheel was appointed by the Government of Pakistan to serve as the head of the Islamic Military Counter Terrorism Coalition, a 41-nation Islamic military alliance being headquartered in Saudi Arabia.

== Awards and decorations ==

Nishan-e-Imtiaz (Military) (Order of Excellence)		Hilal-e-Imtiaz (Military) (Crescent of Excellence)	
Tamgha-e-Baqa (Nuclear Test Medal) 1998	Tamgha-e-Istaqlal Pakistan (Escalation with India Medal) 2002	10 Years Service Medal	20 Years Service Medal
30 Years Service Medal	35 Years Service Medal	Tamgha-e-Sad Saala Jashan-e- Wiladat-e-Quaid-e-Azam (100th Birth Anniversary of Muhammad Ali Jinnah) 1976	Hijri Tamgha (Hijri Medal) 1979
Jamhuriat Tamgha (Democracy Medal) 1988	Qarardad-e-Pakistan Tamgha (Resolution Day Golden Jubilee Medal) 1990	Tamgha-e-Salgirah Pakistan (Independence Day Golden Jubilee Medal) 1997	Command & Staff College Quetta Instructor's Medal

=== Foreign decorations ===
Foreign Awards
Saudi Arabia	Order of Abdulaziz al Saud
USA	The Legion of Merit (Degree of Commander)
Brazil	Order of Military Merit
Turkey	Turkish Legion of Merit
Jordan	The Order of Military Merit (Grand Cordon)

== Effective dates of promotion ==
Insignia	Rank	Date
	General, COAS	Nov 2013
	Lieutenant General	Apr 2010
	Major General	Feb 2006
	Brigadier	June 2001
	Colonel	July 1999
	Lieutenant Colonel	May 1993
	Major	Oct 1984
	Captain	Oct 1979
	Lieutenant	Apr 1977
	Second Lieutenant	Oct 1976

== Bibliography ==
- Din Ali Pirzada, Chief of Army Staff General Raheel Sharif: Soldier and Statesman, Karachi: Royal Book Company, 2016, 321 p.

Military offices
Preceded by Ashfaq Pervez Kayani	Chief of Army Staff; 2013–2016	Succeeded by Qamar Javed Bajwa
