= Jinnahpur =

Proposed autonomous state in Pakistan

Jinnahpur جناح پور
- Proposed Province
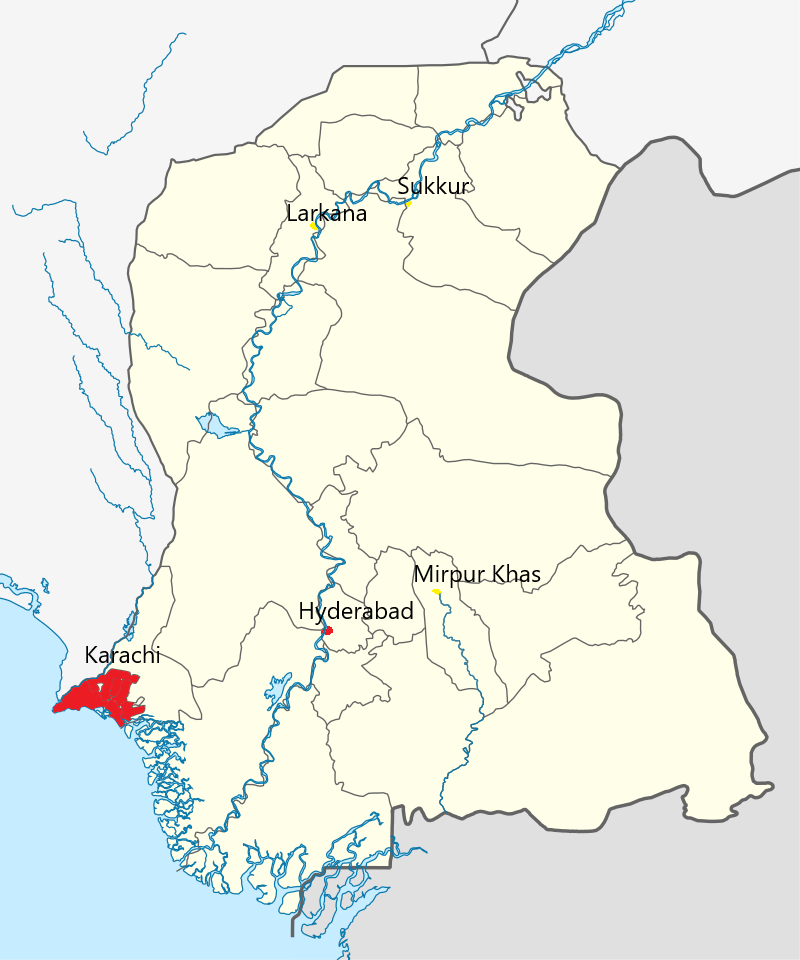
- Red (Majority Urdu speaking regions), Yellow (Minority Urdu speaking regions)
- Country: Pakistan
- Capital: Jinnahpur (Karachi)
- Largest city: Jinnahpur (Karachi)
- Time zone: UTC+05:00 (PST)

Jinnahpur refers to an alleged plot in Pakistan to form a breakaway autonomous state to serve as a homeland for the Muhajir people.

== Overview ==
Muhajirs were immigrants who moved to modern-day Pakistan from modern-day India during partition of India in 1947. The name to be given to the proposed breakaway state was "Jinnahpur", named after Muhammad Ali Jinnah. In 1992, the Pakistani military planted the maps of the proposed Jinnahpur state in the offices of the Muhajir Qaumi Movement (now renamed Muttahida Qaumi Movement) to frame them. The government of Nawaz Sharif chose to use it as the basis for the military operation against the MQM, known as Operation Clean-up.

== Critics ==
In August 2009, Lt Gen (R) Naseer Akhtar, a former corps commander of Karachi, and Brigadier Imtiaz Ahmed, a former director-general of the Intelligence Bureau (IB) who had participated in Operation Clean-up, said that the Jinnahpur maps had been fabricated. According to them, the Jinnahpur maps were false allegations and an attempt to divide the nation. Their stance was immediately challenged by Major (R) Nadeem Dar, then an ISI officer, who claimed to have recovered maps and related documents personally after raiding MQM headquarter and sent them to Major Haroon and Major Nadeem.
