= Sindh Rangers =

Pakistani paramilitary force

Pakistan Rangers Sindh سندھ رینجرز
- Insignia of the Sindh Rangers
- Common name: Sindh Rangers

Agency overview
- Formed: 1942; 84 years ago (as Sindh Rifles); August 20, 1994; 32 years ago (as Pakistan Rangers Sindh)
- Employees: 24,630 personnel

Jurisdictional structure
- Federal agency: Pakistan
- Operations jurisdiction: Pakistan
- Map of Sindh Rangers' jurisdiction (in red) within Pakistan
- Governing body: Ministry of Interior, Sindh Home Department
- Constituting instrument: Pakistan Rangers Ordinance, 1959
- General nature: Federal law enforcement
- Specialist jurisdictions: Paramilitary law enforcement, counter insurgency, riot control; National border patrol, security, integrity

Operational structure
- Headquarters: Karachi, Sindh
- Agency executive: Major-General Laiq Rafiq, Director General
- Parent agency: Civil Armed Forces

Website
- pakistanrangerssindh.org

The Sindh Rangers (formally Pakistan Rangers Sindh) (Sindhi:سنڌ رينجرز) is a federal paramilitary force in Pakistan. It is one of nine Civil Armed Forces and is one of two Ranger forces with the other one being the Punjab Rangers, which operates in Punjab province. The paramilitary operates administratively under the Interior Ministry of Pakistan, which consists of the Interior Secretary and Interior Minister and the Sindh Home Department which consists of the Home Secretary and Home Minister, but is usually commanded by officers on secondment from the Pakistan Army. Their primary purpose is to secure and defend about 912 km (567 mi) of the southern part of the border with neighbouring India. They are also often involved in major internal and external security operations with the regular Pakistani military and provide assistance to municipal and provincial police forces to maintain law and order against crime, terrorism and unrest.

As part of the paramilitary Civil Armed Forces, the Rangers can fall under the full operational control of the Pakistan Armed Forces when necessary. This is not exclusively limited to a wartime scenario, but whenever Article 245 of the Constitution of Pakistan is invoked to provide "military aid to civil power". An example of this occurring was in 2013, when Karachi, Pakistan's most populous city, had ranked as the sixth-most dangerous city worldwide due to intense violence by criminals, corrupt political agents and Islamist militants (whose presence came as a consequence of the Soviet–Afghan War and Pakistan's intake of millions of Afghan refugees in the 1980s). As the situation severely deteriorated and fell out of the control of local police, the Pakistan Rangers undertook a large-scale military operation and initiated an intense crackdown on criminals, the MQM political party, as well as Taliban-aligned militants. This operation took Karachi down from the world's sixth-most dangerous city to 93rd, and allowed the residents of Karachi to resume a normal lifestyle that had been disrupted due to the chaos.

== Role ==
Aside from the primary objective of guarding the 912 kilometer of the international boundary that Sindh province shares with India on the India–Pakistan border, the Rangers are also responsible for maintaining internal security in Pakistan and serve as a major law enforcement organization in the country. Despite this, they do not possess the power to make arrests like the regular police with the exception of when the state temporarily sanctions them with such an authority in times of extreme crisis. Their primary objective as an internal security force is to prevent and suppress crime by taking preventive security measures, cracking down on criminals and thwarting organized crime with the use of major force. All suspects apprehended by the Rangers during a crackdown are later handed over to police for further investigation and possible prosecution when the chaos is brought under control. The same privileges are also temporarily granted by the government to other security organizations such as the Frontier Corps for the same reasons.

The Rangers are also tasked with securing important monuments and guarding national assets in all major cities, including Islamabad.

The Rangers have notably contributed towards maintaining law and order in Islamabad, Karachi and Lahore in major crises, due to the developing internal instability in Pakistan.

== History ==
The origins of the Rangers go back to 7 October 1958 where small paramilitaries were restructured and renamed to the West Pakistan Rangers. In 1972, following the independence of East Pakistan and Legal Framework Order No. 1970 by the Government of Pakistan, the force was officially renamed from the West Pakistan Rangers to the Pakistan Rangers and put under control of the Ministry of Defence with its headquarters at Lahore.

In 1974, the organization became part of the Civil Armed Forces under the Ministry of Interior, where it has remained since.

In late 1989, due to growing riots and the worsening situation of law and order in the province of Sindh, a new force was raised for a strategic anti-dacoit operation. The paramilitary force operated under the name of the Mehran Force and consisted of the then-existing Sindh Rangers, three battalions of the Pakistan Army (including the Northern Scouts). The Mehran Force was under the direct command of the Director-General (DG) of the Pakistan Rangers with its nucleus headquarters in Karachi.

Following these series of events, the federal government decided to substantially increase the strength of the Pakistan Rangers and raise a separate, dedicated headquarters for them in the province of Sindh. On 1 July 1995 the Pakistan Rangers were bifurcated into two distinct forces, the Pakistan Rangers – Punjab (Punjab Rangers) and Pakistan Rangers – Sindh (Sindh Rangers). Consequently, the Mehran Force and other Pakistani paramilitary units operating in the province of Sindh were merged with and began to operate under the Sindh Rangers.

=== Wartime responsibilities ===
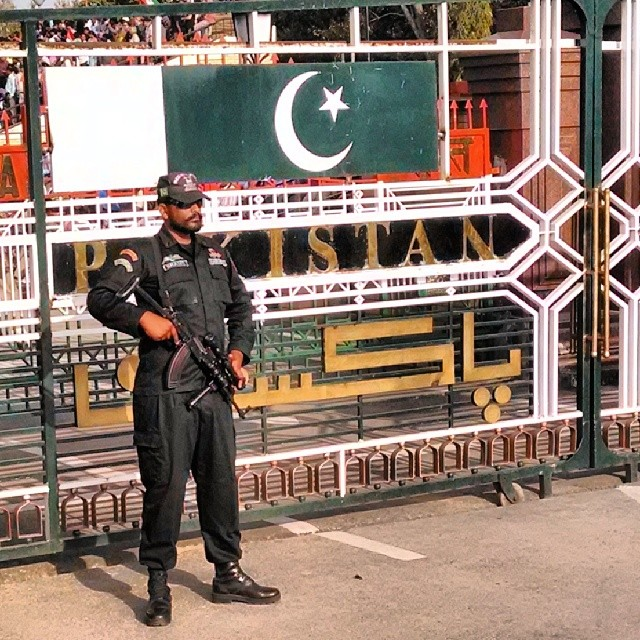
A Punjab Ranger at the Wagah border.

The West Pakistan Rangers fought alongside the Pakistan Army in several conflicts, namely the Indo-Pakistani War of 1965 and the Indo-Pakistani War of 1971. After the war in 1971 and subsequent independence of Bangladesh, the force was federalized under the Ministry of Defence as the Pakistan Rangers and shortly afterwards in 1974, it was made a component of the Civil Armed Forces (CAF) under the Ministry of Interior. Since then, the Pakistan Rangers are primarily responsible for guarding the border with neighbouring India during times of peace and war. The Pakistan Rangers are credited for providing the Pakistan Army with additional troops for Special Police Units (SPUs) for various peacekeeping missions during the Yugoslav Wars (United Nations Protection Force - Croatia/Bosnia and Herzegovina) and in Haiti (United Nations Stabilization Mission - Haiti).

UN peacekeeping troops from SPUs are entrusted with the task to provide protection and security to UN officials, provide operational and backup support, respond to threats to public order, and assist various humanitarian agencies. The Pakistan Rangers have participated in military exercises with the Pakistan Army's Special Service Group (SSG) and also assisted with military operations in the past since their revitalization and rebuilding after the Indo-Pakistani War of 1971. The first such participation was in 1973, when they operated under the command of the SSG to raid the Iraqi embassy in Islamabad alongside local police. In 1992, the Sindh Rangers saw an extensive deployment throughout Karachi to keep peace in the city in support of the Government of Sindh. The Sindh Provincial Police and Pakistan Rangers were involved in Operation Blue Fox against the MQM with direction from the Pakistan Army. Due to their close association with the military, the Rangers also saw combat against regular Indian troops during the Kargil War of 1999 in Kashmir.

=== Deployment in Karachi ===
When threats to the business and political community were increasing alarmingly in Karachi in the forms of kidnapping for ransom, extortion, industrialists began to shift their investments and activities to Bangladesh and other countries. Chief of Army Staff, General Ashfaq Pervez Kayani took notice of the dire situation and at the request of the government as well as the business community, the Pakistan Rangers were deployed with special powers granted by the constitution. The Rangers played a crucial role in restoring and maintaining peace and curbed law offenders without any discrimination and consideration of political affiliation. The people of Karachi and the business community in particular took major relief from this and lauded the role of the Rangers throughout Sindh.

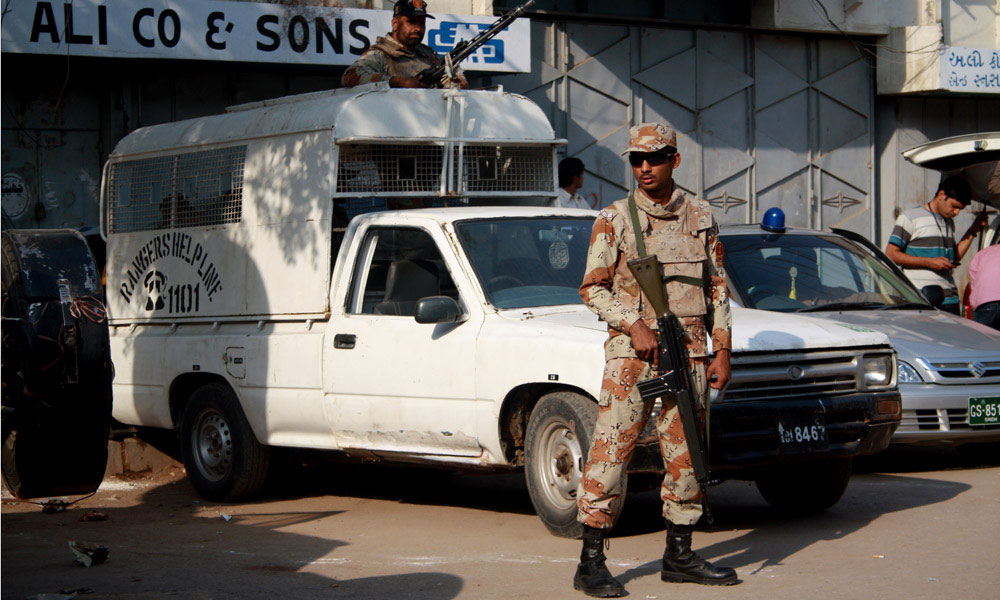
Sindh Rangers personnel standing guard in Karachi.

In July 2010 in a citywide operation across Karachi, the Rangers captured 83 people who were suspected of criminal activity. The suspects were transferred to the custody of local police.

During 2011-12 the subunits of the Rangers, along with other law enforcement agencies, received a number of drug-testing kits from a UN programme, to assist in their work against the smuggling of drugs through Pakistan.

Director-General (DG) of the Sindh Rangers, Ejaz Chaudry visited the Karachi Chamber of Commerce and Industry on 17 November 2011 – where the entire business community unanimously acclaimed the Pakistan Rangers' role in maintaining peace in the city and demanded the extension of their stay with special orders for another year.

In June 2011, a Ranger patrol was involved in the extra-judicial killing of an unarmed 22-year-old man in Karachi. The man was alleged to be a thief who had just been caught. A widely distributed video showed a Ranger shooting the man twice at close range and then waiting for him to die. The footage was later broadcast by major news networks throughout the country and sparked intense public backlash and protests. The police later announced they had arrested two Rangers for the killing. The Sindh High Court sentenced Shahid Zafar (the Ranger who killed the man) to death. Various appeals for acquittal were made by Zafar's lawyers but were overturned by the Supreme Court of Pakistan which upheld the death sentence.

In March 2015 the Rangers raided the main office of the Muttahida Qaumi Movement (MQM) in Karachi and detained members of the party. A large amount of armaments and ammunition were seized in the raid.

The corps was involved in assisting the General population during a heatwave in June 2015 by providing medical care at ten locations in Karachi including the corps hospital.

In January 2016, two employees working for Pakistan International Airlines (PIA) were found dead after a chaotic public protest blocked a road near Jinnah International Airport. The Sindh Rangers were assigned to clear the streets of protesters and restore public order.

U.S. Lieutenant-General Vincent Stewart gave testimony to a US Senate committee in February 2016, in which he said the Rangers operations carried out in Karachi had helped reduce violence in the country.

In March 2016, the Sindh Rangers requested the Supreme Court of Pakistan to allow the force to establish its own policing stations throughout Karachi, citing the lack of composure and efficiency on the part of the regular Sindh Police.

Another major operation in October 2017 saw the Rangers arrest 16 people accused of being gang members in the Lyari area, engaged in various crimes such as robbery and selling illegal drugs.

The policing powers of the Rangers have been repeatedly renewed because by law they can only assist in law enforcement on a temporary basis. One example of this was in July 2018 when the expiry date for the powers was moved to 10 November 2018. Another example was on 6 April 2019 when the provincial government issued a notice to prolong these powers until 4 July 2019.

Beyond the policing powers, the Rangers have also assisted in rescue and relief operations during emergency situations such as in August 2020 when Karachi experienced considerable flooding from heavy rainstorms.

The force has also participated in operations to counter the smuggling and supply of illicit drugs. In October 2022 the Rangers collaborated with the Anti Narcotics Force to seize over 100 kg of hashish.

In November 2022 the Rangers coordinated with local police and stopped a bus carrying 122 people of Afghan origin who could not prove they were citizens or had visas.

=== Public communication ===
The Sindh Rangers are starting their own radio show in Karachi, known as "Rangers Hour" on FM 101, which is intended to communicate with and broadcast news as well as relevant updates to the people of the metropolis; preceding this, a radio service was also launched by the Sindh Police on FM 88.6 with a similar purpose. The Sindh Rangers also established a 24-hour helpline (1101) for the people to report any applicable information or crime/terrorism in the city.

== Organisation ==
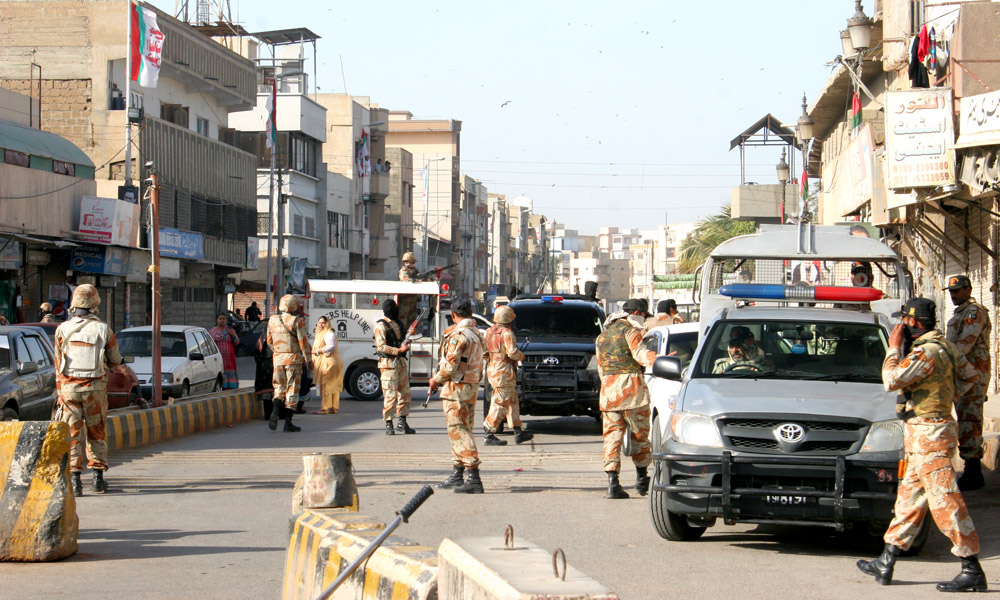
Sindh Rangers in 2015

The Rangers are a paramilitary force with the primary purpose of serving as the border guard along the India–Pakistan border. The Rangers function under the authority of a director-general (DG) appointed by the Pakistan Army after clearance from the Chief of Army Staff. The DG Sindhi Rangers holds the two-star rank of major-general. Currently, the DG Sindh Rangers is Major-General Azhar Waqas (HI) M. The majority of the other officers come from the Army, however some Rangers can be inducted as direct-entry sub-inspectors. These officers can reach a maximum rank of Senior Superintendent Rangers (SSR) - roughly equivalent to the army rank of lieutenant colonel. Personnel joining as sepoys can reach a maximum rank of honorary DSR (Deputy Superintendent Rangers), which would be equivalent to an army captain.

The Sindh Rangers headquarters have been at the Jinnah Courts building in South Karachi since 1999. It is made up of approximately 24,630 personnel, of which 15,000 are serving in Karachi. The corps is subdivided into 30 wings (which function similarly to a battalion) — each consisting of about 600-700 Rangers.

In addition to the Sindh Rangers' primary duty of border security (covering the province of Sindh's 912 kilometre-long border with India), they also have the responsibility of patrolling and protecting the Indus River, national highways and areas with hilly terrain where regular police forces cannot operate properly.

=== Units ===
The Rangers are divided into a number of smaller sectors, each comprising three or four wings. In 2012, the sectors were:

- Rangers Hyderabad 1
- Rangers Hyderabad 2
- Rangers Karachi 1
- Rangers Karachi 2
- Rangers Karachi 3
- Rangers Nawabshah
- Rangers Sukkur
- Shahbaz Rangers Khairpur.
- Thar Rangers, Tharparkar.
- Rangers Larkana.
- Rangers Ghotki

A 2022 source indicates the three Karachi sectors are called:

- Abdullah Shah Ghazi Rangers
- Sachal Rangers
- Bhittai Rangers

A 2015 source listed eight wings (battalions) in Karachi:

- 44 Wing
- 53 Wing
- 63 Wing
- 72 Wing
- 82 Wing
- 83 Wing
- 91 Wing
- 93 Wing

A news report of January 2021, about the destruction of vast quantities of seized contraband goods by Pakistan Customs, indicated that 73 Wing is based in Hyderabad. A separate news source of April 2021 noted the presence of 51 Wing in Sukkur.

Others

- Rangers Anti-Terrorism Wing
- Rangers Intelligence Wing Karachi
- Rangers Training School, Karachi
- Sindh Rangers Hospital, North Nazimabad
- Rangers Security Guards (Pvt) Ltd - a private business run by the Sindh Rangers (amongst many other commercial ventures)
- Rangers Air Wing (formerly 50 Aviation Squadron) - an air support unit run by the Interior Ministry

=== Training and selection ===
Selection for the Sindh Rangers lasts between 2–3 weeks and both male and female citizens of Pakistan can join. Disregarding physical fitness standards, an applicant must be between 18 and 30 years old to qualify for entry. The educational standards is that the applicant must have passed with a degree in the Faculty of Arts (FA) or Faculty of Science (FSc), roughly equivalent to a high school diploma in the United States, from a government-registered college. After selection and training, a Ranger can be deployed to anywhere in Sindh province (or countrywide in times of crisis) or abroad if necessary, according to the Pakistan Rangers Act of 1959.

=== Ranks and insignia ===
Rank group	General / flag officers	Senior officers		Junior officers
Pakistan Rangers
Pakistan Rangers	Director general ڈائریکٹر جنرل	Senior superintendent of the Rangers سینئر سپرنٹنڈنٹ۔	Superintendent of the Rangers سپرنٹنڈنٹ	Deputy superintendent of the Rangers ڈپٹی سپرنٹنڈنٹ۔	Inspector انسپکٹر	Direct Entry Sub inspector ڈائریکٹ انٹری سب انسپکٹر۔

Rank group	Junior commissioned officers			Non commissioned officer	Enlisted
Pakistan Rangers							No insignia
Pakistan Rangers	Senior inspector سینئر انسپکٹر۔	Inspector انسپکٹر	Sub inspector سب انسپکٹر۔	Havildar حوالدار۔	Naik نائیک۔	Lance Naik لانس نائیک۔	Sepoy سپاہی۔

== Standard equipment ==
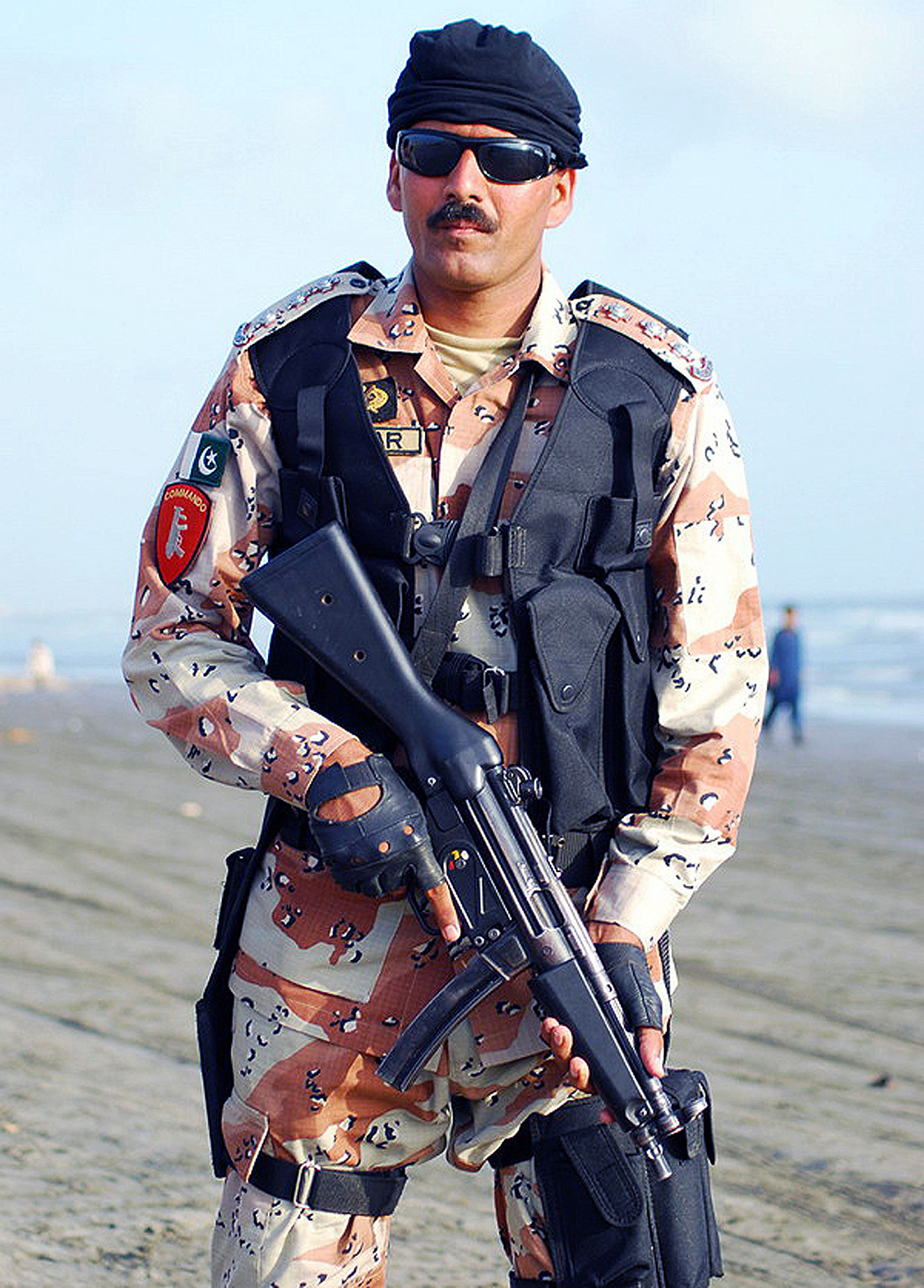
A uniformed Sindh Ranger Senior Inspector in Desert Battle Dress Uniform armed with a Heckler & Koch/POF MP5.

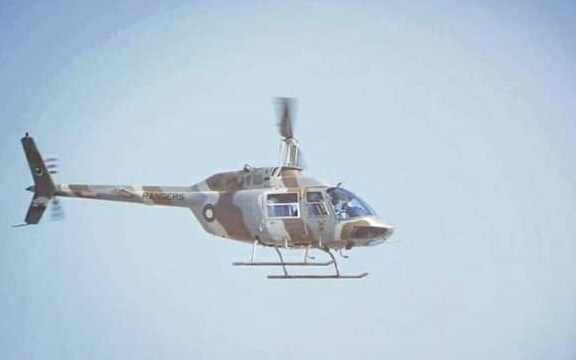
A Bell 206 helicopter in operation by the Sindh Rangers

- Automatic rifles – 7.62mm Heckler & Koch G3, 7.62mm Type 56, 9mm Steyr AUG
- Submachine guns – 9mm Heckler & Koch MP5
- Pistols – Glock series, Sigma series
- Sniper rifles – POF PSR-90, Steyr SSG 69
- Hand grenades – ARGES P84 (POF made)
- Anti-tank weapons – RPG-7, M40 recoilless rifle
- Machine guns – 7.62mm Rheinmetall MG3 (POF made)
- Heavy machine guns – 12.7mm Type 54 (POF made)
- Mortars – Various locally produced in use
- Bulletproof jackets – Various local and foreign types
- Helmets – Modular Integrated Communications Helmet (MICH) and various indigenously produced helmets
- Optics – NVGs
- Utility vehicles – Toyota Hilux, APC Saad/Talha
- Helicopters – Mil Mi-17, Bell 412, Bell 206

== Sindh Rangers' schools and colleges ==
Sindh Rangers run various educational facilities for the upliftment of the rural areas of Sindh.

Some of the Rangers governing schools and colleges located across Sindh are

- Quaid-i-Azam Rangers School & College Toll Plaza Karachi
- Quaid-i-Azam rangers School & College nazimabad karachi
- Quaid-i-Azam Rangers School & College Hyderabad
- Quaid-i-Azam Rangers School Sukkur
- Quaid-i-Azam Rangers School Larkana
- Quaid-i-Azam Rangers School & College Benazirabad@Nawabshah
- Quaid-e-Azam Rangers Public School Umerkot
- Thar Rangers Welfare School
- Rangers Public School Choondiko, Khairpur

== Director-Generals ==
	Name	From	to
	Major General Muhammad Ashraf	1997	October 2001
	Major General Salauddin Satti	2001	2003
	Major General Shahid Aziz	2003	2005
	Major General Javed Zia	2005	2006
	Major General Jamil-ul-Rehman Afridi	2006	2008
	Major General Liaquat Ali Khan	2008	2009
10	Major General Ijaz Chaudhry	2010	2012
11	Major General Rizwan Akhtar	March 2012	August 2014
12	Major General Bilal Akbar	August 2014	Dec-2016
13	Major General Muhammad Saeed	Dec-2016	April 2019
14	Major General Syed Omer Ahmed Bokhari	April 2019	December 2021
15	Major General Iftikhar Hassan Chaudhry	December 2021	Sept 2022
16	Major General Azhar Waqas	Sept 2022	November 2024
17	Major General Shamraiz Khan Tanoli	November 2024	September 2026
18	Major General Laiq Rafiq	September 2026	Incumbent

== See also ==
- Punjab Rangers
- Civil Armed Forces
- National Guard (Pakistan)
- Pakistan Levies
