= Muttahida Qaumi Movement – Pakistan =

Pakistani political party

Muttahida Qaumi Movement (Pakistan) متحدہ قومی موومنٹ (پاکستان) United National Movement (Pakistan)
- Abbreviation: MQM-P
- Leader: Khalid Maqbool Siddiqui
- Deputy Convener(s): Syed Mustafa Kamal; Farooq Sattar; Nasreen Jalil; Amir Khan
- Founder: Farooq Sattar
- Founded: August 23, 2016; 10 years ago
- Split from: MQM-L
- Preceded by: MQM-L
- Headquarters: Bahadurabad, Karachi
- Student wing: All Pakistan Muttahidda Students Organization
- Charity Wing: Khidmat-e-Khalq Foundation
- Youth Wing: Mohajir Youth Movement
- Women Wing: Mohajir Women Movement
- Ideology: Pakistani nationalism; Muhajir nationalism; Social liberalism; Secularism
- Political position: Centre to centre-left
- National affiliation: PDM
- Colors: Red Green White
- Slogan: Empowering People
- Senate of Pakistan: 4 / 100
- National Assembly of Pakistan: 23 / 336
- Provincial Assembly of Sindh: 42 / 168

Election symbol
- Kite

Party flag

Website
- mqmpakistan.net

Muttahida Qaumi Movement – Pakistan (MQM–P) (Note: Urdu: متحدہ قومی موومنٹ (پاکستان) Muttahidah Qọ̄mī Mūvmaṅṫ Pākistān) is a Pakistani political party with a liberal political position and a Muhajir nationalist ideology. The leader of the party is Khalid Maqbool Siddiqui. The party's symbol is the kite. It is mostly active in Karachi where the majority of Muhajirs currently reside. The party aims to represent the human rights of Muhajirs in Pakistan through peaceful and democratic struggle. The Party is a splinter faction of MQM-L.

== History ==
The party came into existence due to a split within the MQM-L, and was founded as a separate party by Farooq Sattar, who split it from MQM founder and leader Altaf Hussain. The faction was announced after Sattar's release from custody by the Pakistan Rangers a paramilitary organization.

== Election campaigns ==
MQM-P participated in two major by-elections since its formation, but was defeated in both.

=== Senate of Pakistan ===
Election	Leader	Seats		Position	Resulting Coalition
Election	Leader	#	±	Position	Resulting Coalition
2018	Khalid Maqbool Siddiqui	5 / 104	▲1	5th	Opposition Coalition
2021	Khalid Maqbool Siddiqui	3 / 100	▼2	6th	Opposition Coalition
2024	Khalid Maqbool Siddiqui	1 / 100	▼2	6th	Coalition Government

=== National Assembly ===
Election	Leader	Votes		Seats		Position	Resulting Coalition
Election	Leader	#	%	#	±	Position	Resulting Coalition
2018	Khalid Maqbool Siddiqui	733,245	1.38	7 / 342	▼17	8th	PDM Coalition (2018 - 2022) PDM Coalition (2022 - 2024)
2024	Khalid Maqbool Siddiqui	1,119,962	1.89	21 / 336	▲14	8th	Coalition Government

=== Sindh Assembly ===
Election	Leader	Votes		Seats		Position	Resulting Coalition				
Election	Leader	#	%	#	±	Position	Resulting Coalition				
Election	Leader	2018	Khawaja Izharul Hassan	766,789	7.65	Position	Resulting Coalition	21 / 168	▼30	3rd	Opposition Coalition
2024	Ali Khursheedi	905,896	7.99	36 / 168	▲15	2nd	Coalition Government				

== Merger with PSP ==
On 8 November 2017, MQM Pakistan and Pak Sarzameen Party announced an "establishment-sponsored" merger. However it took a long time before PSP merger was announced by Syed Mustafa Kamal during a MQM convention with Farooq Sattar and Khalid Maqbool Siddiqui on 12 January 2023 before the 2023 local government elections in Sindh.

== Party desertion ==
Many MQM lawmakers left the Sattar faction in the past, including deputy mayor Arshad Vohra.

== PIB vs Bahadurabad faction ==
MQM-Pakistan was further divided into the Farooq Sattar (PIB) and Bahadurabad factions.

== See also ==
- Mohajir Qaumi Movement Pakistan
- Muttahida Qaumi Movement – London
- MQM militancy
- MQM violence (1994–2016)
- Pak Sarzameen Party
