= Altaf Hussain (Pakistani politician) =

British Pakistani politician; founder of the Muttahida Qaumi Movement (born 1953)

- الطاف حسین
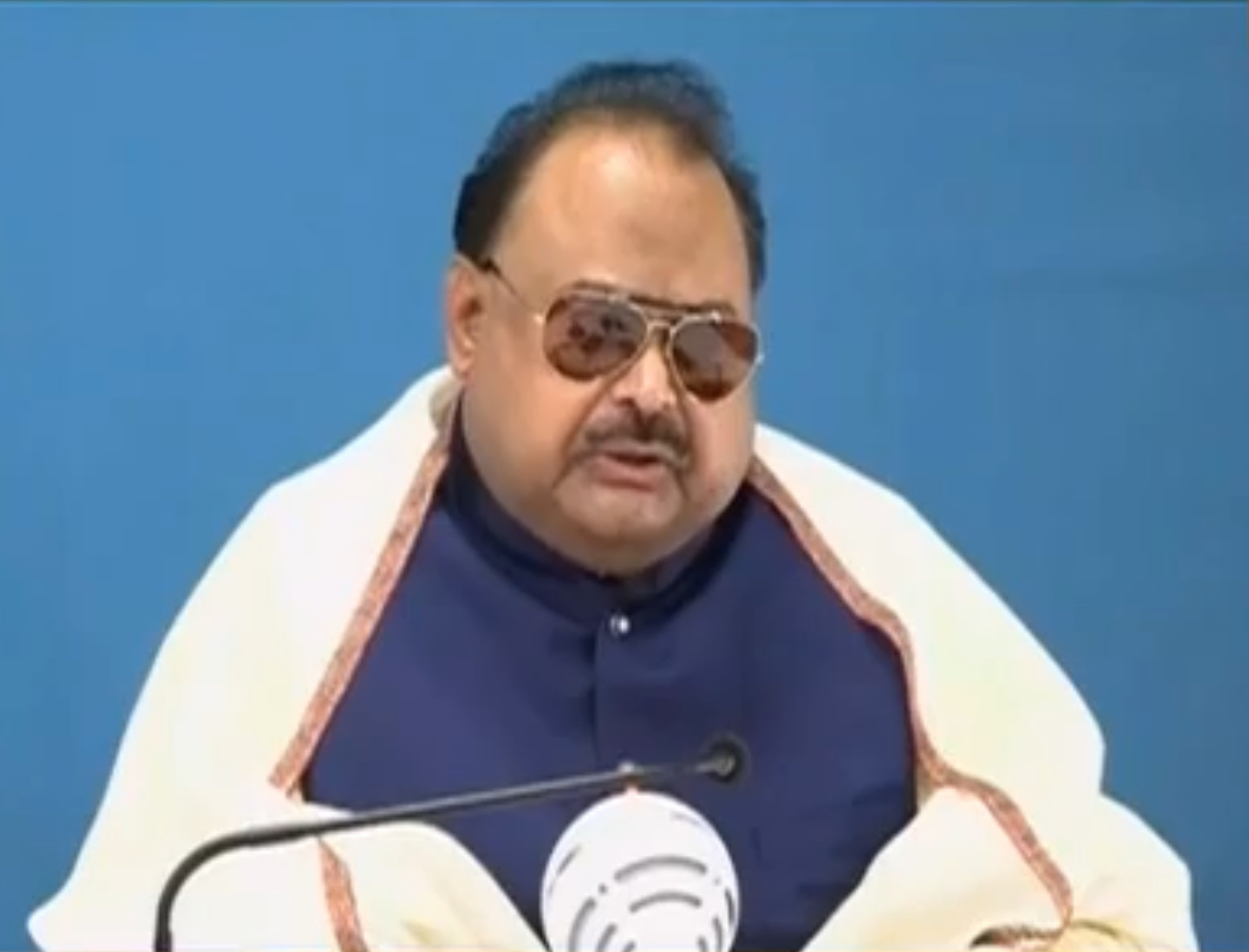
- Hussain on ABP Sanjha in 2019

Leader of the Muttahida Qaumi Movement
- Incumbent
- Assumed office 18 March 1984
- Preceded by: Office established

Personal details
- Born: 17 September 1953 (age 73) Karachi, Pakistan
- Party: Muttahida Qaumi Movement
- Spouse: Faiza Gabol (m. 2001; div. 2007)
- Children: Afzaa Altaf
- Education: University of Karachi; Islamia Science College
- Occupation: Politician
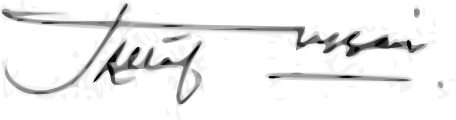
- Signature

Altaf Hussain (Urdu: الطاف حسین; pronounced [əltaːf ɦʊseːn]; born 17 September 1953 in Karachi) is a British Pakistani politician who is known as the founder of the Muttahida Qaumi Movement. He fled Pakistan in 1992 after the Operation Clean-up crackdown against his party was launched, moving to live in exile in the United Kingdom. Since 2015, he has been a fugitive from the Anti Terrorism Court of Pakistan on the charges of 'murder, targeted killing, treason, inciting violence and hate speech'. He went on trial in the UK in January 2022 for 'promoting terrorism and unrest through hate speech in Pakistan', and was acquitted the next month.

His supporters refer to him as Pir Sahib (Sufi spiritual guide), Quaid-e-Tehrik (leader of the movement), Rahbar (guide) or Altaf Bhai (brother Altaf).

== Early life ==
=== Family background ===
Altaf Hussain was born on 17 September 1953 to Nazir Hussain and Khurseed Begum in Karachi. Before the independence of Pakistan, Hussain's parents resided at their ancestral home in Nai ki Mandi, Agra, U.P., British India. His father Nazir Hussain was an officer with the Indian Railways in Agra. His paternal grandfather Maulana Ramzan Hussain was the Grand Mufti of Agra. His maternal grandfather Pir Haji Hafiz Rahim Bakhsh Qadri was also religious scholar. Hussain had four sisters and six brothers.

Following the partition of India in 1947, a wide-scale migration of Muslims ensued, mostly from the various states in the Dominion of India to the newly established Dominion of Pakistan. Hussain's parents were initially reluctant to leave everything behind in Agra to resettle in Pakistan but were later forced by Hussain's elder brother to reconsider. Upon emigrating to Pakistan, the family settled in Karachi. They were provided with government housing in Abyssinia Lines reserved for Muhajirs (people and families migrating from the Dominion of India).

Hussain's elder brother Nasir Hussain was later employed by the government and given a small dwelling on Jehangir Road. The family subsequently left their government allotted residence and moved in with Nasir. The family later moved again in the 1970s to a small house in Azizabad, which later became the headquarters of Hussain's political party, the Muttahida Qaumi Movement (MQM; formerly the Muhajir Qaumi Movement).

=== Education and non-political career ===
Hussain received his early education from the Government Comprehensive School in Azizabad. He later enrolled in the Government Boys Secondary School to complete his matriculation in 1969. For the first year of his intermediate education in pre-medical sciences, he attended the National College Karachi. He later moved to City College Karachi for his second year.

In 1974, Hussain graduated from the Islamia Science College with a Bachelor of Science. In 1979, he graduated from the University of Karachi with a Bachelor of Pharmacy. After graduating, Hussain began his career as a trainee at the Seventh-day Adventist Hospital in Karachi while simultaneously working for a multinational pharmaceutical company.

=== Short-lived military service ===
In 1970, General Yahya Khan introduced the National Service Cadet Scheme (NSCS), making it compulsory for higher secondary scholars to enlist with the army. According to the MQM, Altaf Hussain enlisted with the Pakistan Army through the NSCS and was assigned to the 57th Baloch Regiment as soldier number 2642671. Upon completion of his training his regiment was assigned from Hyderabad to Karachi, from where it was sent to East Pakistan via ships.

== Political career ==
After the 1971 Indo-Pakistani War came to an end in 1971, Hussain returned to West Pakistan to wilfully join with the regular army. According to MQM, the selection officer rejected him because his parents were Muhajirs who came from India, even when he insisted he was born in Pakistan. This is quoted as one of the many instances that formulated Hussain's future political aspirations. The political struggle of the All Pakistan Muhajir Students Organisation (APMSO) shifted to include the issue of stranded Pakistanis in Bangladesh, and on 14 August 1979, Hussain participated in a demonstration at the Mazar-e-Quaid for the safe return of stranded Pakistanis, also called Biharis. Following the demonstration, he was arrested and sentenced on 2 October 1979 to nine months imprisonment and flogging with five strokes. Hussain was later released on 28 April 1980 after he had served his sentence.

The urban centres of Karachi and Hyderabad had increasingly become ethnically diverse and riots along ethnic lines were commonplace. In May 1985, a Pakhtun minivan driver struck and killed a Muhajir schoolgirl, inciting the first Afghan-Muhajir ethnic riot. Later, following an unsuccessful raid on an Afghan heroin processing and distribution centre in Sohrab Goth by security forces, the Afghans attacked Muhajir residents of Aligarh Colony, which instigated the bloody riots of December 1986. These riots saw the popularity of the MQM and its leader Altaf Hussain rise and the party's ideology was greatly influenced as a result.

Before October 1986, the urban city of Hyderabad was largely dominated by the Sindhi nationalist party Jeay Sindh Qaumi Mahaz (JSQM) founded by G. M. Syed, giving rise to the nationalist slogan Sindhudesh (Sindhi: سنڌو ديش, lit. 'Country of Sindhis'). The only Muhajir political movement countering the JSQM was led by Syed Mubarak Ali Shah, Nawab Zahid Ali Khan and Nawab Muzaffar Hussain. After their deaths, the Urdu-speaking people of Hyderabad were without a charismatic Muhajir leader.

On 31 October 1986, Hussain gave his first public address in Hyderabad at the site of the historic Pacco Qillo, where he was greeted by a crowd. After his address, his message was well received by the Urdu-speaking people of Hyderabad, and he was able to fill the void left by the deaths of the Muhajir leaders. Hussain and a few of his companions were arrested by security personnel after his address, implicating him in several alleged criminal cases. His arrest enraged his supporters, who launched public movements for his release. The charges against him and his companions were later dropped and they were released from Karachi Central Prison on 24 February 1987.

In 1987 the government began widespread arrests of MQM workers all over Sindh. Hussain surrendered to law enforcement on 30 August 1987 on the condition that the arrests of his party's workers be stopped immediately. During Hussain's imprisonment, the MQM placed highly in the local elections of 1987, and there was pressure to release him. He was released on 7 January 1988.

In early 1987, Hussain issued the MQM's Charter of Purpose (Urdu: قرادادِ مقصود, romanized: Qarardad-e-Maqasid), which formed the basis for the party's ideology. The charter was paramount in addressing many of the "long-standing grievances" of Sindhi nationalists, and a cooperative arrangement was worked out between the MQM and various Sindhi nationalist parties in early 1988. Apart from the points stipulated in the party's original resolution, Hussain also introduced the idea of Muhajir being a fifth subnationality of Pakistan alongside the Punjabis, Pathans, Balochis, and Sindhis.

Hussain said that while he was admitted to Abbasi Shaheed Hospital in 1988, Late Hameed Gul, Inter-Services Intelligence (ISI) chief at the time, a sent him a briefcase full of money via Brigadier Imtiaz Ahmed. He said the intention was to bribe him into joining the military establishment-led Islami Jamhoori Ittehad (IJI; Urdu: اسلامی جمہوری اتحاد, lit. 'Islamic Democratic Alliance') coalition which was against the Pakistan People's Party (PPP), but he rejected the offer. Later both Ahmed and Gul confirmed the statement.

The 1988 general election indicated that the voting patterns in Sindh were based on ethnic lines, as the PPP and the MQM won almost all of the province's seats in the National Assembly. The PPP had derived its support from the Sindhi population in the province, and the MQM from the Muhajirs. In less than four years since its founding, the MQM had emerged as the third-largest political party in Pakistan.

The PPP had been successful in Sindh but didn't fare well in the other provinces and had to resort to forming a coalition government. Hussain and his party offered their support, but insisted on a formal agreement between the PPP and the MQM. This 59-point MQM-PPP accord, known as the Karachi Declaration, was signed on 2 December 1988. It reiterated many of the points defined in the earlier MQM charter. However, when Benazir Bhutto came into power, she was unwilling or unable to commit to her part of the bargain. Her reluctance in this matter was largely interpreted by Muhajirs as pro-Sindhi and anti-Muhajir. When the declaration was not implemented violence erupted between the APMSO and the PSF, the student wings of the MQM and the PPP, respectively.

After Bhutto's disavowal, Hussain approached Nawaz Sharif, leader of the IJI, which was an opposition coalition opposed to the Bhutto government. As a result of their meeting, a formal agreement between the MQM and the IJI came to pass. However, when Sharif later came into power, he did not honour those commitments either. Hussain became increasingly harsh and hostile in his opinions regarding the governing parties and would often accuse them of political hypocrisy. Due to the perception that striving for justice in a constitutional capacity was futile, ethnic militancy thrived. The gulf between Muhajirs and Sindhis widened, leading to several cases of ethnic cleansing in Hyderabad. Hussain favours peace between India and Pakistan and is a vocal advocate of bridging gaps between the two neighbouring rivals.

== Views ==
=== Jammu and Kashmir ===
On the issue of Kashmir, Hussain stated that Indo-Pakistani dialogue should be allowed to "proceed on the basis of mutual adjustment and agreement... [and it] should be clear to all concerned that there can be no military solution to any of the contentious issues, let alone the issue of Kashmir."

=== Muhajir interests ===
While much of the politics of the MQM revolve around fighting for justice for the Muhajir community in Pakistan, Hussain claims that the party "[stands] for equal rights and opportunities for all irrespective of colour, creed, caste, sect, gender, ethnicity or religion". The party started out as a movement for the empowerment of Muhajirs in Pakistan but later modified its underlying ideology to reflect a broader political scope, by changing its name from Muhajir Qaumi Movement to Muttahida Qaumi Movement.

=== Partition of India ===
He claims that the partition of India "was the division of blood, culture, brotherhood, [and] relationships".

=== Stranded Pakistanis ===
Hussain has advocated for the government of Pakistan to assist stranded Pakistanis, who are mostly of the Bihari ethnic group, to be safely repatriated to Pakistan from Bangladesh.

=== Taliban ===
Hussain is a critic of the Taliban, warning in 2008 against the Talibanisation of Karachi and stating that a "well planned conspiracy to intensify sectarian violence in the city was being hatched."

== Operation Clean-up, ban and other charges ==
The Pakistani government launched Operation Clean-up in 1992 and sent the Rangers and Police into Karachi to crack down on the MQM. Hussain escaped Karachi one month before the operation began, following an attack on his life on 21 December 1991. He fled to London in 1992 and applied for political asylum. In the later months of 1995, the political killings of members from both parties sparked an outcry throughout the city. This involved the killing of the younger brother of PPP's Syed Abdullah Shah, the Chief Minister of Sindh, which subsequently led to the killing of Hussain's 62-year-old brother Nasir and 27-year-old nephew Arif. From 1993 to 1996, the port city of Karachi was a political battleground between Prime Minister Bhutto's PPP and the MQM. In the wake of the ensuing political unrest, the MQM remained vocal about the arbitrary arrests and extrajudicial killings of its members.

In 2015, the Lahore High Court banned media coverage of Hussein, with the airing of his image and speeches banned across all electronic and print media. The Anti Terrorism Court of Pakistan declared him a fugitive on the charges of treason, inciting violence, and hate speech, and sentenced him to 81 years in prison. In 2017, the Anti Terrorism Court issued non-bailable arrest warrants for Hussain in the murder case of Dr. Imran Farooq, who was a senior member of the MQM. Pakistan asked Interpol to issue a red warrant against Hussain but Interpol refused, saying it does not "intervene in political and religious matters of a state".

It was reported that the Karachi police and the paramilitary Sindh Rangers force had arrested Nasir Hussain and his son in the Federal B area of Karachi on 4 and 6 December 1995, respectively. In a statement issued on 7 December 1995, the MQM blamed the government and the law enforcement agencies for the unlawful arrests of Nasir and Arif from their residence in Samanabad. On 9 December 1995, the badly mutilated corpses of both Nasir and Arif were found in an isolated area in Gadap Town in Karachi, and were taken to a nearby Edhi centre.

Hussain and other leaders of the MQM decried the cases against him, which the party alleges are false, politically motivated cases against the MQM related to the 1990s operation against them. In November 2009 all cases were dropped under the National Reconciliation Ordinance, however the ordinance was later found unconstitutional by the Supreme Court of Pakistan.

On 20 June 2013 the London Metropolitan Police started a money laundering case against Hussain when it recovered some cash from his residence during a search. On 3 June 2014 he went to a police station for an interview. On 17 September 2016, his bail was cancelled for insufficient evidence. On 13 October 2016, Scotland Yard officially dismissed the money laundering case on the basis of lack of evidence.

Pakistan Tehreek-e-Insaf's chairman Imran Khan accused him of inciting violence and soliciting murder in Karachi. In response, numerous complaints were filed with the London Metropolitan Police against Hussain for inciting violence. Scotland Yard couldn't find any credible evidence in the incitement of violence case and subsequently dropped it.

On 11 June 2019, Hussain was detained by Scotland Yard in connection with a speech made on 22 August 2016 under Section 44 of the Serious Crime Act 2007 and was acquitted on 15 February 2022. Farooq Sattar, one of the senior members of the MQM in Pakistan, distanced himself from Hussain and the London-based leadership's statements and said the party is not against Pakistan.

== Retirement ==
=== Altaf Hussain's August 2025 announcement ===
On 12 August 2025, Altaf Hussain, founder of Muttahida Qaumi Movement–London, addressed a global gathering of MQM workers via video link and declared that he was "relieving all party workers of their oath of allegiance to him". He stated:

" For the past 47 years, I have been struggling for the rights of Pakistan’s deprived and oppressed people, especially the Muhajir community. I have worked day and night without a single day off. In this struggle, we have endured the martyrdom of thousands of colleagues, enforced disappearances, displacement, destruction of homes, forced occupation of properties, and countless other sacrifices. My own family has not been spared either. My 28-year-old nephew, Arif Hussain, was hacked to death with an axe. My 70-year-old brother-in-law, Aslam Ibrahmani, was arrested from Karachi, brutally tortured for six months in Adiala jail, and dumped outside in a near-dead state, before he succumbed to his injuries. None of my siblings escaped the ordeal of repeated raids on their homes, forcing them into exile, Despite the martyrdom of thousands of comrades, the anguish of thousands of disappeared colleagues, and the imprisonment of many — including those still in jail — I have concluded that I have failed not only to change Pakistan’s rotten and outdated system, but also to secure the rights of my Muhajir nation. Therefore, from August 10, 2025, I relieve all comrades, including the former coordination committee, convener, deputy convener, and all workers, from the oath of loyalty they took to the movement and to me. They are now free to join any political party they wish, wherever they wish, and wherever they wish. As long as I live, I will continue the movement to achieve rights through social media. Success or failure is in the hands of God. "

Hussain recounted past sacrifices, including the enforced disappearance and killing of his brother and nephew.

=== Interpretation as party dissolution ===
Commentators and media outlets widely interpreted the statement as effectively signalling the dissolution of MQM–London as a political organization, owing to the removal of its foundational loyalty structure.

== Personal life ==
Hussain married a Baloch women named Faiza Gabol in 2001 and divorced in 2007. They have a daughter Afzaa Altaf.

== In popular culture ==
Jamil Jamali, a character inspired by Hussain and PPP politician Nabil Gabol, is portrayed by Rakesh Bedi in the Indian spy thriller duology Dhurandhar (2025) and Dhurandhar: The Revenge (2026).

== Books ==
- My Life’s Journey: The Early Years (1966–1988), a translation of Safar-e-Zindagi, 2011.
- Philosophy of Love, 2014.
