= Zafar Baloch =

Pakistani politician (1967–2013)

- ظفر بلوچ
- Born: 1 January 1967; Lyari, Karachi, Pakistan
- Died: 18 September 2013 (aged 46); Karachi, Pakistan
- Occupations: Politician, community leader
- Known for: Lyari political leadership, Peoples Aman Committee
- Political party: Pakistan Peoples Party

Zafar Baloch (1967 – 18 September 2013) was a Pakistani politician, community leader, and member of the Peoples' Aman Committee (PAC), a local organisation and gang operating in Lyari, Karachi. He was known for his strong influence within Karachi's Baloch community and for his role in the complex political and gang-related dynamics of Lyari.

== Early life ==
Zafar Baloch was born in Lyari around 1967 and belonged to the local Baloch community. He rose to prominence through his involvement in community initiatives and his active participation in political and welfare activities within the area.

== Peoples Aman Committee ==
Baloch was considered one of the main leaders of the People's Aman Committee, a controversial organisation allegedly involved in organised crime but also seen by supporters as a protector of Lyari's interests. The PAC was formed as an offshoot of the Rehman Dakait group following Rehman's death.

Though the PAC was officially banned by the government in 2011, its leaders, including Baloch, claimed to work for the welfare of Lyari's residents and maintained informal ties with elements of the Pakistan Peoples Party (PPP).

=== Lyari conflict ===
During the height of the Lyari conflict, Zafar Baloch was viewed as both a powerbroker and a target within Karachi's political and criminal rivalries, particularly in confrontations between PAC groups, law enforcement, and rival political factions. Police operations in Lyari repeatedly targeted PAC members and associates.

== Assassination ==
On 18 September 2013, Zafar Baloch was shot dead by unidentified assailants on motorcycles in the Nayabad area of Lyari. He succumbed to his injuries shortly after the attack. His assassination led to widespread mourning in Lyari and further destabilised the already volatile neighbourhood.

The father of Zafar Baloch accused politician Nabil Gabol of being behind the killing of his son. Subsequently a police case was registered against Gabol. The Express Tribune reported that during the course of the investigation, sources disclosed that the Joint Investigation Team (JIT) which was constituted to investigate the murder of Baloch did not find any conclusive proof of Gabol's involvement in the killing. Habib Jan Baloch, chairperson of Friends of Lyari, rejected the result of the JIT investigation saying “The JIT has no credibility".

== Legacy ==
Baloch remains a controversial figure: hailed as a community protector by supporters and accused of involvement in Karachi's underworld by opponents and law enforcement agencies. His death weakened the PAC's influence and signified the decline of organised resistance in Lyari.

== See also ==
- Uzair Baloch
