= Arshad Pappu =

Pakistani underworld figure

Arshad Pappu (c.1972 – 16 March 2013) was a Pakistani underworld figure and gang leader based in Lyari, Karachi. He led an influential criminal syndicate during the Lyari gang war, clashing primarily with factions led by Rehman Dakait and Uzair Baloch.

== Early life and background ==
Arshad Pappu was the son of Haji Lal Mohammad (known as Haji Laloo), a prominent drug dealer in Lyari. His brother was Yasir Arafat. Through family marriages, Pappu was connected to rival gang leader Rehman Dakait, as Dakait and Pappu's brother Arafat were married to sisters.

== Criminal activities and gang war ==
During the 1990s, Pappu and Rehman Dakait operated together in Lyari before having a violent falling out over ransom money from an abduction. Following the split, Pappu established an independent syndicate.

A major turning point in the Lyari gang war occurred when Pappu was implicated in the kidnapping and murder of Faiz Mohammad (known as "Mama Faizu"), a local transporter and father of Uzair Baloch. After his father's death, Uzair Baloch allied with Rehman Dakait to launch a protracted feud against Pappu's faction.

Pappu was booked by police in over 50 criminal cases involving homicide, extortion, and narcotics. He was imprisoned for five years in Karachi and the Gadani prison in Balochistan. Due to a lack of testifying witnesses, he was acquitted in all cases—including the murder of Faiz Mohammad—and released in early 2012. Following his release, he operated between Karachi and border areas of Balochistan.

== Death ==
On the night of 16 March 2013, Pappu, his brother Yasir Arafat, and an associate named Juma Shera (alias Shera Pathan) visited a flat in the Defence Housing Authority (DHA), where they were abducted by armed men.

They were transported to Lyari, where all three were tortured and killed. Following orders from the Supreme Court of Pakistan, police registered a triple-murder case that indicted Uzair Baloch, Noor Muhammad (alias Baba Ladla), and several police personnel.

== In popular culture ==
- In Aditya Dhar's 2025 Hindi spy thriller film Dhurandhar, Arshad Pappu was portrayed by actor Ashwin Dhar.
