= MQM violence (1994–2016) =

Insurrection in Karachi and Hyderabad, Pakistan

MQM related violence
- Part of MQM militancy
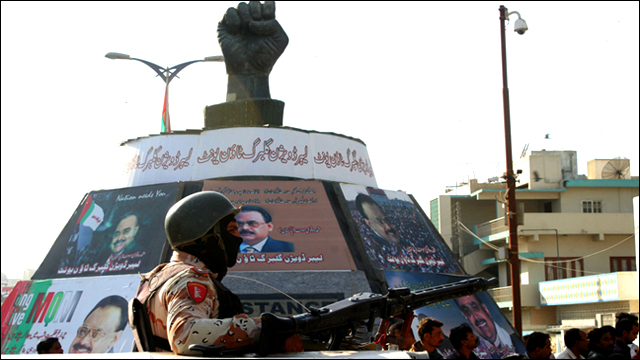
- Pakistan Rangers in 2015 when MQM's HQ Nine Zero was being raided
Date	1994–2016
Location	Karachi and Hyderabad, Sindh, Pakistan
Result	Government of Pakistan victory: Start of Karachi Targeted action and Operation Lyari; Diminishing of MQM militancy; Exile of Altaf Hussain; Splitting of PSP and MQM-P from MQM-L

Belligerents
MQM-L (no border) MQM-H	Pakistan: Sindh; Karachi Government; Supported by: Pakistan Army	ANP; PPP: PAC; Sunni Tehreek; TLP (from 2015) TTP; Jundallah; SSP; LeJ

Units involved
MQM-L: Good Friends; Sector Commanders; Nadeem Commando (1990-95); Faheem Commando (1990-95); (no border) MQM-H	Civil Armed Forces; Frontier Constabulary; Pakistan Rangers; Sindh Rangers; ATW; (no border) Pakistan Police; CTD; Sindh Police; SSU; Pakistani Intelligence community; NACTA; IB; FIA; SB; Supported by: Pakistan Army	ANP; PPP: PAC; Sunni Tehreek; TLP (from 2015) TTP; Jundallah; SSP; LeJ
- 700 killed (1994), 1,770–1,990 killed (1995) 748 killed (2010), 1,244–1,345 killed (2012), 2,909 killed (2014)

The MQM violence refers to political violence related to the Muttahida Qaumi Movement (MQM), a political party and militant organization representing the Muhajir community. Violence began in 1978 against the Sindh government and various other opponents. It was eventually suppressed during Operation Clean-up.

In 1994, after the military's withdrawal, MQM launched another wave of anti-state, sectarian, and ethnic violence. The intensity of this violence subsided following Operation Lyari and Karachi's targeted action. The 2015 Nine-Zero raids led to the arrest of several key MQM leaders and marked the beginning of a crackdown on the party. Another crackdown on 22 August 2016 resulted in the closure of the party headquarters near 90 Azizabad, Khursheed Memorial Hall, MPA Hostel, and Jinnah Park. Several other MQM leaders were arrested, marking "the end of the story for the party founder, Altaf Hussain".

== Violence ==
=== Anti-state activities ===
According to the Sindh Police, from 1991 to 2014, more than 2,000 Havaldars, officers, and informants were killed by MQM.

In August 1989, 18 people, including a police personnel, were killed by MQM gunmen in Karachi.

In February 1990, 82 people were killed during MQM-organised anti-government demonstrations in Karachi and Hyderabad.

During May and June 1994, MQM carried out a series of attacks following the end of Operation Clean-up. These included car bombings, riots, and targeted killings, resulting in the deaths of around 750 people, including non-Urdu speakers and other opponents of MQM.

The conflict reached its bloodiest phase in May 1995, when MQM militants resurfaced and systematically ambushed government offices, police stations, and police patrols using rocket launchers. Although sporadic ethnic and sectarian violence had been a constant feature of Karachi since the 1980s, the level of organization and intensity of violence in 1995 was unprecedented. About 300 people were killed in June alone, with the death toll reaching 600 within two months and 2,000 over the year, primarily due to ethnic violence. Analysts compared the situation to the Kashmir insurgency, which was also ongoing in the 1990s.

On 25 June 1995, nearly eighty policemen were killed in a five-week-long assault by MQM militants, and a total of 221 security personnel lost their lives over the year. Meanwhile, more than seventy police operations resulted in the killing of over 121 individuals labelled as "terrorists," who were believed to be MQM activists or sympathizers. By 1996, the situation was described as a virtual civil war between Pakistani security forces and MQM.

In 2002, MQM assumed office in the provincial government and was elected to the city government in 2006 and 2008. However, Karachi newspapers accused the MQM of eliminating opponents with impunity. This also involved violent, unchecked land expansion and the rise of real estate 'entrepreneurs' who were allegedly engaged in illegal or forceful land occupation, backed by powerful political patrons within MQM. Karachi witnessed exceptionally high levels of violence in 2011, with approximately 800 people killed in targeted attacks attributed to MQM, out of a total of 1,800 killings across the city.

=== Ethnic violence ===
In October 1988, MQM activists killed 90 Sindhis in separate attacks in Karachi. In the same month, at least 46 Sindhis were killed in ethnic riots. In total, 250+ Sindhis died due to MQM retaliation.

In 2007, during the 12 May Karachi riots, MQM party workers were accused of launching highly coordinated attacks on ANP and PPP supporters, resulting in the deaths of 58 people and injuring hundreds, most of whom were Pashtuns. Fourteen MQM workers were also killed during the clashes.

On several occasions in 2007 and 2008, Pashtun-majority neighbourhoods were subjected to violence and bombings, including coordinated attacks against Pashtun street vendors, restaurant owners, and labourers. There were also targeted killings of ANP activists, who were accused of having links with the Pakistani Taliban.

In 2010, following the assassination of MQM politician Raza Haider, MQM-affiliated gangs gunned down nearly 95 people—primarily Pashtuns, along with a minority of Sindhis and Punjabis—during the 2010 Karachi riots.

In March 2011, an attack on a PPP office marked the beginning of a violent spree in which fifty people were killed, mainly Pashtuns, although Urdu-speakers and Balochs were also among the victims. Another eighteen people were killed in April. Pashtun activists blamed MQM for these attacks, though the party denied the allegations.

On 5 July 2011, during a five-day period of protests after MQM quit the ruling government, 114 people were killed in indiscriminate attacks targeting Pashtuns, regardless of their political affiliations. In mid-July, ANP politicians accused MQM of expelling 3,000–4,000 Pashtuns from their neighbourhoods. Meanwhile, remarks by Sindhi politician Zulfiqar Mirza, criticising MQM and perceived as offensive to Urdu-speakers, reignited violence. MQM mobs rampaged through the city, burning vehicles and causing 14 deaths by the following morning. By the end of July, the death toll had risen to between 200 and 318.

=== Extortion ===
In 2015, MQM was accused of setting fire to a factory as part of an extortion scheme, resulting in the deaths of 258 people. MQM built a network of businessmen and market players, influencing what effectively became a parallel economy in Karachi. This network generated organisational profits through alliances reinforced by violence. Dawn reported that Karachi, as an economic hub, was essentially a "hostage city" under MQM's control.

MQM exerted its influence over the economy not only through extortion profits but also through an organised strategy of intimidation. This included enforcing strikes, pen-downs, tool-downs (also known as down tools), and complete shutdowns of Karachi's economic hub. By doing so, MQM effectively held the city's economy hostage from the rest of Pakistan, using this leverage to extract political concessions from the central government and solidify its position as a ruling power.

=== Attacks on journalists ===
In one incident in 2011, after Pashtun journalist Wali Babar was allegedly killed by MQM in Karachi, four journalists linked to his murder investigation, two policemen, a police officer’s brother, and an informer were all "methodically targeted" by MQM.

=== Sectarian conflict ===
Throughout 2008, approximately 143 killings in Karachi were attributed to clashes between MQM and Sunni Tehreek, a Barelvi Sufi Islamist organisation that recruited former MQM members.

In contrast to MQM-A, the breakaway faction MQM-Haqiqi aligned itself with Sipah-i-Sahaba, an anti-Shia Sunni Islamist organization, in Karachi and was involved in attacks on Shi'a places of worship.

MQM was also involved in clashes with the Pakistani Taliban, which was believed to profit from criminal activities such as bank robbery, thefts, car theft, and kidnapping for ransom.

=== MQM infighting ===
MQM's violent activities were not limited to external confrontations; internal factional violence also took place, with party members being targeted in drive-by shootings. One such instance occurred in the first half of 2009, when over a hundred killings took place due to infighting between MQM-Altaf and MQM-Haqiqi factions.

== Government response and operations ==
=== Operations from 1994 to 1996 ===
During Benazir Bhutto's tenure, Interior Minister General Naseerullah Babar conducted the second operation against MQM between 1994 and 1996.

On 5 September 1995, 8 MQM supporters were killed and 11 were injured when security forces attacked what the MQM billed as a peaceful protest against abuses by security forces against MQM female workers.

Due to serious doubts over the credibility of the operation, which involved fake encounters, extrajudicial killings, and a rise in killings in Karachi, Benazir Bhutto's government was dismissed by the then President of Pakistan, Farooq Ahmed Laghari.

==== Killing of Farooq Dada ====
On 2 August 1995, Farooq Patni, alias Farooq Dada, and three other MQM militants, Javed Michael, Ghaffar Mada and Hanif Turk, were shot dead by police in an armed encounter near the airport when they failed to stop and opened fire on the police.

Farooq Dada was the leader of MQM's Nadeem Commando and was considered to be Pakistan's most wanted man and had a 1.5 million rupee (500k US dollar) price on his head and was wanted for over 140 cases and the murder of over two dozen police officers. Dada was allegedly involved in many killings, extortions and kidnappings.

Armed police officers were waiting for him near the airport after being told that he was moving weapons from the Karachi's Malir district. The Sindh Police claimed that Farooq Dada and three others were on their way to Jinnah International Airport to blow up a PIA plane when police, moved in after being tipped off on their whereabouts. Dada and his three accomplices opened fire on the police as they attempted to do stop and pin down his car. A gun battled ensued in which 10 heavily armed officers fired back back. When officers examined the wreckage of his car they found a weapons cache which included machine guns, AKMs, 4 thousand rounds of ammunition and even an RPG-7.

=== Operation in 1998 ===
In the aftermath of Hakeem Saeed's assassination, federal rule was imposed by Prime Minister Nawaz Sharif in Sindh and an operation was initiated against MQM.

=== Karachi targeted action ===
Due to the rise in target killings, organised crimes such as extortion, kidnapping for ransom, and an increased crime rate in the city, the Karachi operation was launched by the Nawaz Sharif government in 2013 with the intention of restoring peace in the city. Although Interior Minister Chaudhry Nisar claimed that the operation was apolitical, there have been systematic crackdowns against MQM. In 2015, MQM's headquarters, Nine Zero, was raided twice by the paramilitary Rangers, and many top officials of MQM were taken into custody. On 22 August 2016, the headquarters was sealed, and hundreds of MQM offices were bulldozed.

Many journalists opine and claim that the government was behind the formation of PSP and MQM-Pakistan. Many MQM officials, including Prof. Zafar Arif, Kanwar Khalid Yunus, Adv. Sathi Ishaq, Amjadullah Khan, Qamar Mansur, and Shahid Pasha, have been in detention for several months.

Member of National Assembly Kanwar Naveed Jameed and Member of Provincial Assembly Kamran Farooqui had also been arrested by the paramilitary forces.

=== Nine Zero raids ===
On 11 March 2015, Sindh Rangers carried out a raid at Nine Zero, the headquarters of MQM in Karachi, as well as at the party's public secretariat, Khursheed Begum Memorial Hall, and arrested over 100 MQM activists.

At least 27 suspects were presented before an anti-terrorism court. Rangers claimed that they apprehended nearly half a dozen target killers, including Faisal Mehmood, aka 'Faisal Mota', who was sentenced to death in the 2011 murder case of Geo News journalist Wali Khan Babar. A large quantity of arms and ammunition, walkie-talkies, binoculars, and other military gear used by NATO forces in Afghanistan were also seized during the raid.

Nine Zero was sealed on 23 August 2016 by the Pakistan Rangers following a hate speech delivered by MQM's leader, Altaf Hussain where he said: 'Pakistan Murdabad' (Death to Pakistan) and later ordered an attack on an ARY channel office. In this speech, he also incited party workers to attack Pakistani media houses, which led to street rioting and one death in Karachi. This 2015 Rangers raid is considered by some to be a turning point for the MQM party, or as others call it, the beginning of MQM's end as a political force. A section of political analysts believed that the situation had already started worsening for MQM when London's Metropolitan Police arrested and detained Altaf Hussain, the party founder, in 2014 for an investigation involving money laundering, which dispelled the impression that he was untouchable and safe in Britain, despite the charges ultimately being dropped due to a lack of evidence.

Later, many leaders of MQM were arrested by Pakistan Rangers for investigation. Since the 2015 raid, several surprising and sudden developments led to the splitting of MQM into multiple factions. A group of former MQM members formed a new party called Pak Sarzameen Party, under the leadership of Syed Mustafa Kamal and Anis Kaimkhani.

== MQM splintering ==
In 1992 party leaders Afaq Ahmed and Amir Khan, after having developed differences with Altaf Hussain broke from the party, establishing the Mohajir Qaumi Movement – Haqiqi (MQM-H).

By 2016, the Muttahida movement had begun to fragment, leading to the emergence of MQM-Pakistan and other breakaway factions such as the Pak Sarzameen Party (PSP), MQM-PIB Colony and MQM-Bahadurabad factions. The original faction became known as MQM-London.

The MQM also experienced a decline in electoral performance. In the 2018 general elections, PTI won 14 out of 21 National Assembly seats in Karachi due to the MQM's weakening influence, while the PPP secured its first mayoral victory in Karachi in 2023.

Another breakaway faction, MQM-Haqiqi, which was established in 1992, also saw a decline in popularity, failing to win any seats in the 2013 and 2015 elections. According to an article in Dawn, the Security Establishment's influence over MQM has grown significantly.

In 2023, the Pak Sarzameen Party (PSP) and the Farooq Sattar Group announced their merger into MQM-P. However, they boycotted the 2023 local bodies elections, a move that MQM leader Raza Haroon criticised, stating that it "essentially threw the party out of politics for the next four years."

In the 2024 general elections, MQM-P secured 20 National Assembly seats in Karachi. In a leaked video, Sindh Governor and MQM-P leader Kamran Tessori said the party did not get its expected votes in the 2024 elections, saying "[o]ur situation is going to be even worse. We did not get votes in the elections." Further contrasting it with the 2018 election where the party only won seven seats.

== See also ==
- MQM militancy
- Operation Clean-up
- Operation Lyari
- Insurgency in Sindh
- Insurgency in Balochistan
- Insurgency in Khyber Pakhtunkhwa
- Terrorism in Pakistan
- Sectarian violence in Pakistan
