= Omar Shahid Hamid =

Pakistani writer and police officer (born 1977)

Omar Shahid Hamid (born October 23, 1977) is a Pakistani writer, a serving police officer of the Police Service of Pakistan, and son of the assassinated Malik Shahid Hamid, managing director of the Karachi Electric Supply Corporation (KESC).

== Career ==
Omar Shahid Hamid was born on 23 October 1977. He was educated at the Karachi Grammar School and studied law at the University of Kent from 1995 and 1998.

After successfully passing the CSS examinations, Omar joined the Police Force in 2003 as an ASP. His first appointment was in Police Headquarters, Garden, Karachi. He has served in Karachi's dangerous Lyari district during the gang wars, and has also served in the Intelligence Bureau and in the Sindh Police's Counter Terrorism Department.

== Personal life ==
Omar Shahid Hamid is the son of the late Shahid Hamid, a bureaucrat and managing director of KESC (now K-Electric), who was murdered along with his driver Ashraf Brohi and guard Khan Akbar, in the neighborhood of Defence Housing Authority, Karachi on 5 July 1997. Saulat Mirza, the accused in the case, was convicted and sentenced to death by the court, and was hanged in Mach Jail on 12 May 2015. Omar is married and has one son.

== Death threat ==
Omar Hamid has served as a police officer for 17 years. In 2011, while he was serving as head of Karachi's counter-terrorism cell, he was placed on a Taliban hit list. He subsequently took a leave of absence from the police for five years and went to London where he wrote his first three novels. In 2016, Omar returned to Karachi and rejoined the counter terrorism department of the Sindh Police as a Senior Superintendent of Police (SSP).

== Writer ==
While on sabbatical, Omar wrote a crime thriller novel, The Prisoner (2013), inspired by his experiences in the police and as a counter-terrorism specialist. The book became a bestseller in both India and Pakistan, was longlisted for the DSC South Asia Literature Prize, and is being adapted for a feature film. His second thriller novel, The Spinner's Tale, was published in 2015 by Pan Macmillan India, and was loosely based on events and characters involved in the kidnapping of the Wall Street Journal reporter Daniel Pearl, who was murdered in Karachi in 2002. The Spinner's Tale won the Karachi Literature Festival's fiction prize in 2017, and also won the Italy Reads Pakistan prize in the same year. Omar released his third thriller novel, The Party Worker, in January 2017. In 2018 he won the Karachi Literature Festival Fiction Prize a second time for The Party Worker (2017). The Party Worker was contracted in March 2019 for a Netflix adaptation. The Fix (2019), a cricket thriller, explored the arcane world of cricket match-fixing. Betrayal is his fifth novel. Shuja Nawaz, author of Crossed Swords: Pakistan, Its Army, and the Wars Within, writes about Betrayal: “another riveting thriller ripped from the headlines by Omar Shahid Hamid. The counterterrorism expert takes you on a high-speed chase down the rabbit hole of hostile South Asian politics. The search for an Indian mole at the heart of Pakistan’s security structure takes you across the globe at breathless speed, combining a love story with the murky world of spycraft. You will want to read it non-stop.” Betrayal, an espionage thriller novel, released in 2021.

== In popular culture ==
He is portrayed by Aditya Uppal in the 2025-2026 Indian spy action thriller duology Dhurandhar (2025) and Dhurandhar: The Revenge (2026), which are based on Operation Lyari.
