= Dhurandhar =

2025 Indian film by Aditya Dhar

- Theatrical release poster
- Directed by: Aditya Dhar
- Written by: Aditya Dhar (Note: Additional Screenplay by Shivkumar V. Panicker and Ojas Gautam)
- Produced by: Aditya Dhar; Lokesh Dhar; Jyoti Deshpande
- Starring: Ranveer Singh; Akshaye Khanna; Sanjay Dutt; Arjun Rampal; R. Madhavan; Sara Arjun; Rakesh Bedi; Gaurav Gera; Danish Pandor; Manav Gohil
- Cinematography: Vikash Nowlakha
- Edited by: Shivkumar V. Panicker
- Music by: Shashwat Sachdev
- Production companies: Jio Studios; B62 Studios
- Distributed by: Jio Studios; PVR Inox Pictures
- Release date: 5 December 2025
- Running time: 214 minutes
- Country: India
- Language: Hindi
- Budget: ₹250–255 crore (combined with part 2)
- Box office: ₹1,350.83–₹1,428 crore

Dhurandhar (Note: transl. Stalwart) is a 2025 Indian Hindi-language spy action thriller film written and directed by Aditya Dhar. Produced by Dhar, Lokesh Dhar and Jyoti Deshpande under Jio Studios and B62 Studios, the film features an ensemble cast consisting of Ranveer Singh, Akshaye Khanna, Sanjay Dutt, Arjun Rampal, R. Madhavan, Sara Arjun, Rakesh Bedi, Gaurav Gera, and Danish Pandor alongside several supporting actors. The first instalment of a duology, it centres on a high-stakes covert counter-terrorism operation. The film follows an undercover Indian intelligence agent who infiltrates Karachi's criminal syndicates and political power structures in Pakistan in an effort to dismantle a terror network targeting India.

The film's storyline draws loose inspiration from multiple real-life geopolitical events and conflicts in South Asia, including the 1999 IC-814 hijacking, the 2001 Indian Parliament attack, the 2008 Mumbai attacks, and developments linked to Pakistan's Operation Lyari. Principal photography for Dhurandhar took place from July 2024 to October 2025 across multiple locations in India and abroad, including the states and union territories of Punjab, Maharashtra, Chandigarh, Ladakh and Himachal Pradesh, as well as Thailand. The film features music composed by Shashwat Sachdev, cinematography by Vikash Nowlakha, and editing by Shivkumar V. Panicker. With a runtime of 214 minutes, Dhurandhar ranks as one of the longest Indian films ever produced.

Dhurandhar was released theatrically on 5 December 2025 and received mixed reviews from critics, with praise for its cast performances, direction, cinematography, action sequences, musical score, and production design, with criticism directed towards its extended runtime. The film also attracted controversy for its blending of fictional elements with real historical events, with some commentators describing it as propagandistic. Commercially, the film achieved significant box-office success, grossing over ₹1,000 crore worldwide within three weeks of release, having beat multiple records, including being the fifth-highest-grossing Indian film, second highest-grossing A-rated Indian film, and the second highest-grossing Hindi film worldwide at the time of its release.

The film was banned from theatrical release in several Gulf Cooperation Council countries. A direct sequel, Dhurandhar: The Revenge, was released on 19 March 2026.

== Plot ==
On 30 December 1999, Minister of External Affairs Devavrat Kapoor and Ajay Sanyal, Director of the Intelligence Bureau negotiate with terrorist Zahoor Mistry to release three terrorists and pay a US$10 million ransom in exchange for the lives of airline passengers held captive in Kandahar. Though R&AW Special Secretary K. S. Bhullar rejects Sanyal's proposal to infiltrate terrorist networks in Pakistan, Kapoor later authorises Sanyal's covert "Operation Dhurandhar" following the 2001 Indian Parliament attack.

Three years later, in 2004, Hamza Ali Mazari is an Indian agent who reaches Pakistan via the Torkham border crossing in Afghanistan, landing up in the Lyari suburb of Karachi. He meets Mohammed Aalam, a juice-shop owner, moves in with him, and works as a waiter while studying local gang politics. As a Baloch, Hamza can align only with the gang led by gangster Rehman Dakait and his cousin and deputy Uzair Baloch.

Hamza learns that a rival Pathan gang, led by Rehman's estranged father Babu Dakait and Arshad Pappu, plan to kill Rehman's eldest son Naieem Baloch. Babu's men attack a wedding attended by Naieem and his younger brother Faizal; Hamza saves Faizal, but Naieem is killed. At the hospital, Rehman and Uzair note Hamza's firearm skills and recruit him. Jameel Jamali of the Pakistan Awami Party (PAP) urges Uzair not to retaliate before the general elections, but Hamza encourages revenge. Rehman's gang massacres Babu's men, and Rehman brutally murders Babu with a weighing stone, proclaiming Baloch dominance over Lyari.

At a PAP rally, Hamza meets Jameel's young daughter Yalina and begins a relationship with her. Rehman is introduced to Major Iqbal of the ISI by the Khanani brothers, businessmen who are nudging Rehman into politics; Iqbal requests weapons and ammunition for a terror attack on India and in return, he will get Rehman a place in politics. Hamza learns about Iqbal and Khanani’s counterfeit-currency operation, and relays the information to Aalam, in reality an Indian field agent, who informs Sanyal; the IB suspects Pakistan possesses Indian currency plates. Rehman and his men get the requested weapons from Balochistan.

However, because of a threat given by Rehman to Khanani, he informs Jameel that Rehman is entering politics. Jameel’s career is threatened by this. Backed by Major Iqbal, Rehman enters politics and declares an alliance between his party the People's Aman Committee, and the PAP of Aquib Ali Zarwari. Jameel responds by recruiting suspended Superintendent of Police Chaudhary Aslam to eliminate Rehman, an old nemesis to Aslam, leading to the formation of the Lyari Task Force. On the day of the delivery of the weapons, Rehman’s son suddenly falls sick and is rushed to the hospital while Hamza and Uzair go to deliver weapons. There, Hamza learns that the attack has been postponed as an Indian agent had told the IB of their arrival and sees Iqbal torture that Indian spy. During the way to the hospital, Rehman is arrested by Aslam and Hamza interrogates the chef of the house who admits to Jameel, Aslam and Pappu plotting to kill Rehman in a staged encounter; the meeting between the three was recorded by Yalina. Hamza threatens Jameel that if Rehman isn’t released, he will leak the video and torture LTF officers at their secret office. Aslam is forced to release Rehman.

Despite Hamza's intelligence, the 26/11 Mumbai terror attack occurs and Rehman, Iqbal, Khanani watch it live from the KKI factory in his attendance. Traumatized, Hamza meets Aalam and resolves to dismantle Pakistan's terror infrastructure. He secretly proposes to Jameel that by marrying Yalina, he will rule Lyari while granting Jameel lasting influence. He then conspires with Jameel and Aslam to eliminate Rehman. At Hamza and Yalina's wedding, Major Iqbal requests another weapons shipment for an attack on Amritsar. Exploiting Rehman's drunkenness, Hamza schedules the delivery to coincide with another engagement, creating an ambush opportunity. On the day of delivery, Hamza sends Uzair to the shipment site while driving Rehman to Aslam's trap. Rehman realises the betrayal mid-journey; a violent struggle follows, ending in a crash. Hamza escapes, kills two of Rehman's henchmen, and helps Aslam subdue Rehman, who later dies from his injuries in the hospital.

Hamza's real identity is revealed to be Jaskirat Singh Rangi, an Indian death-row inmate turned covert operative for Ajay Sanyal. With Rehman eliminated, he consolidates power in Lyari and prepares to target "Bade Sahab", the architect of multiple Pakistani terror attacks.

== Cast ==
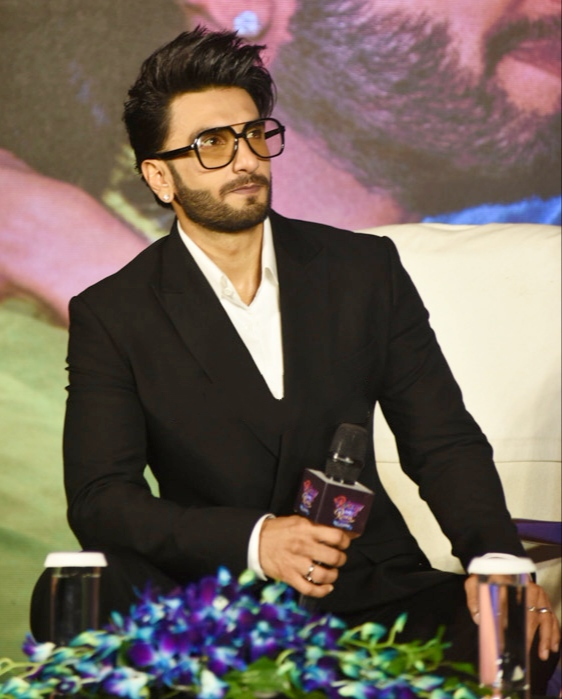
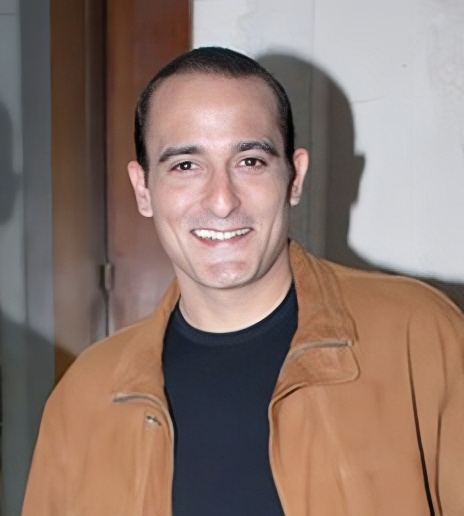
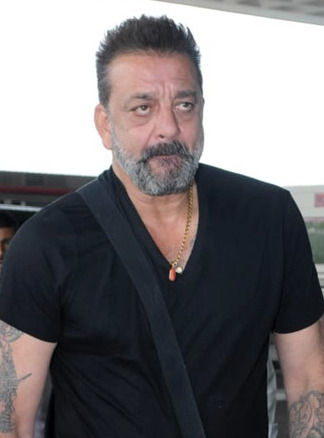
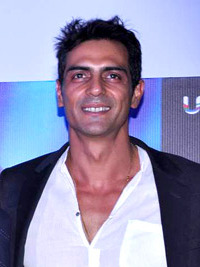
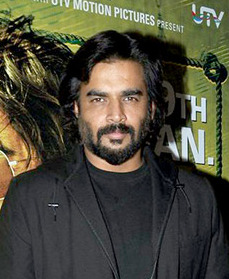
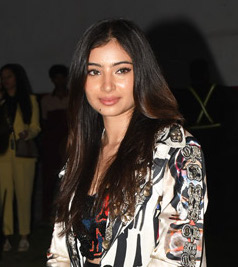
From left to right: Ranveer Singh, Akshaye Khanna, Sanjay Dutt, Arjun Rampal, R. Madhavan, and Sara Arjun appear in key roles in the film.
- Ranveer Singh as Hamza Ali Mazari / Jaskirat Singh Rangi
- Akshaye Khanna as Rehman Dakait, leader of the Baloch gang and chairman of the People's Aman Committee
- Sanjay Dutt as SP Chaudhary Aslam, Lyari Task Force, Sindh Police
- Arjun Rampal as Major Iqbal, ISI (based on Ilyas Kashmiri and Major Iqbal)
- R. Madhavan as Ajay Sanyal, Director of IB (based on Ajit Doval)
- Sara Arjun as Yalina Jamali, Jameel's daughter
- Rakesh Bedi as Jameel Jamali, a senior politician of the Pakistani Awami Party (PAP) and Member of the National Assembly (based on Nabil Gabol and Altaf Hussain)
- Gaurav Gera as Mohammed Aalam, a juice shop owner in Lyari; Hamza's handler
- Danish Pandor as Uzair Baloch, Rehman's cousin and second-in-command of the Baloch gang
- Manav Gohil as Sushant Bansal, Deputy Director of IB
- Saumya Tandon as Ulfat, Rehman's wife
- Bimal Oberoi as Shirani, leader of the Baloch United Force (BUF)
- Asif Ali Haider Khan as Babu Dakait, leader of the Pathan gang; Rehman's father
- Naveen Kaushik as Donga, Rehman's right-hand-man
- Mustafa Ahmed as Rizwan Shah
- Rouhallah Gazi as Siyahi, Rehman's henchman
- Shrysh Zutshi as Baba Ladla "Babla"
- Hitul Pujara as Naieem Baloch, Rehman's elder son
- Aditya Uppal as ASP Omar Haider, Lyari Task Force (based on Omar Shahid Hamid)
- Madhurjeet Sarghi as Prabhneet Kaur Rangi, Jaskirat's mother
- Gitikka Ganju Dhar as Shabnam, Jameel's wife and Yalina's mother
- Ashwin Dhar as Arshad Pappu, leader of the Pathan gang
- Nadeem Khan as Akhlaq, Rehman's cook
- Ankit Sagar as Javed Khannani, co-founder of Khanani & Kalia International (KKI)
- Mushtaq Naika as Altaf Khanani, co-founder of KKI; Javed's twin brother
- Vinod Tharani as Azam Cheema, Lashkar-e-Taiba (LeT) intelligence chief; planner of the 26/11 attacks
- Faiz Khan as Sajid Mir, LeT operative; chief planner of the 26/11 attacks
- Sanjay Mehta as Abdul Bhuttovi, co-founder and leader of LeT, planner of the 26/11 attacks
- Carl Andrew Harte as David Headley, planner of the 26/11 attacks
- Dalvinder Saini as Ajmal Kasab, one of the perpetrators of the 26/11 attacks
- Vivek Sinha as Zahoor Mistry (Zahid Akhund), one of the hijackers of the Indian Airlines Flight 814 (IC-814)
- Rajesh Sangwan as Ibrahim Athar, one of the hijackers of IC-814
- Sanjay Mehndiratta as Aquib Ali Zarwari, President of Pakistan; leader of the PAP (based on Asif Ali Zardari)
- Akash Khurana as Devarat Kapoor, Minister of External Affairs (based on Jaswant Singh)
- Ali Raza Namdar as K. S. Bhullar, Special Secretary of R&AW (based on A. S. Dulat)
- Abhishek Singh as Terrorist Ismail
- Shweta Shrivastav as Constable Kamlesh Kumari Yadav
- Krystle D'Souza as dancer in the song "Shararat"
- Ayesha Khan as dancer in the song "Shararat"
- Jasmine Sandlas as singer in the song "Shararat"
- Madhubanti Bagchi as singer in the song "Shararat"

== Production ==
The film was officially announced in July 2024 by Ranveer Singh and Aditya Dhar on their social media accounts. The official title was revealed in December 2024. Principal photography took place from July 2024 to October 2025 across India and Thailand. Initially conceived as a single film, the project was later split into two parts due to its scale and narrative complexity, with both instalments shot concurrently as a single project.

== Music ==
The soundtrack was composed by Shashwat Sachdev, in his second collaboration with Dhar after Uri: The Surgical Strike (2019). The songs featured lyrics written by Irshad Kamil. Justin Jose served as the re-recording mixer for the film. The music rights were acquired by Saregama.

The title track was released on 15 October 2025. Featuring vocals by Hanumankind and Jasmine Sandlas, it is a remake of the 1995 Punjabi-language song "Na Dil De Pardesi Nu" sung by Muhammad Sadiq and Ranjit Kaur, composed by Charanjit Ahuja and written by Babu Singh Maan. The second single titled "Ishq Jalakar (Karvaan)" was released on 25 November 2025, ahead of its schedule due to high public demand. This song was a recreated version of the Hindi Qawwali "Na To Karvan Ki Talash Hai" from Barsaat Ki Raat (1960), sung by Manna Dey, Asha Bhosle, Sudha Malhotra, S. D. Batish & Mohammed Rafi, composed by Roshan and written by Sahir Ludhianavi.

The third single "Gehra Hua" was released on 27 November 2025. The full album was released on 1 December 2025. The extended album with five additional songs was released on 10 December 2025.

== Marketing ==
A first-look poster and a teaser were released on 6 July 2025, coinciding with Singh's 40th birthday. The teaser featured vocals by Jasmine Sandlas and Hanumankind. The trailer was originally scheduled to release on 12 November. It was postponed due to the 2025 Delhi car explosion. Later, it was released on 18 November 2025 at the Nita Mukesh Ambani Cultural Centre in Mumbai. The teaser and trailer were edited by Ojas Gautam, Dhar's brother-in-law, who also served as a second unit director and additional screenwriter for the film. The audio launch took place on 1 December 2025.

While promoting the film at the 56th International Film Festival of India in Goa, Singh received backlash for mimicking a sacred deva ritual, which some people found to be disrespectful towards the Bhoota Kola tradition of the Tulu people. He later issued a formal apology. In January 2026, an FIR was filed against Singh for allegedly hurting religious sentiments.

== Release ==
=== Theatrical ===
Dhurandhar was released worldwide on 5 December 2025. The film received an A (adults only) certificate from the CBFC for strong violence, along with a finalised runtime of 214 minutes after some violent visuals and profanities were censored. It was received well in North America, crossing over USD 2 million in its first weekend and continued to perform well across the US, UK, Australia and parts of Europe, helping it top ₹200 crore in overseas markets. The film was de facto banned across countries of the Gulf Cooperation Council.

On 31 December 2025, the distributors replaced the film's Digital Cinema Package (DCP) across India with an altered version. The changes included muting words like 'Baloch' and 'intelligence' after they were 'found to be offensive to certain communities'. Previously, the filmmakers received a legal notice from members of the Baloch community, which accused them of defaming the Baloch. Objections were raised in particular to a line "You can trust crocodiles but not the Baloch".

The film was re-released again in India on 12 March 2026 while in the overseas it was released on 13 March 2026. The re-release happened in more than 1,000 screens worldwide, ahead of the release of the sequel.

=== Distribution ===
The film was distributed by PVR Inox Pictures in areas of Central India, Tamil Nadu and Kerala.

=== Home media ===
The digital streaming rights for the first part were acquired by Netflix for ₹85 crore. The film began streaming on Netflix from 30 January 2026 in Hindi along with dubbed versions in Tamil and Telugu languages. The streaming release had 9 minutes cut from the film's original theatrical version, making this version's runtime 205 minutes (3 hours and 25 minutes). However, mostly statutory disclaimers regarding smoking were removed from the digital version to streamline the pace of the film.

Later, Netflix reported the film trended at number one in 22 nations globally, most notably in Middle Eastern and Asian countries. The film, with 7.6 million views, also became the first Indian film to cross 7 million views on Netflix within its first weekend, surpassing films like Animal, Fighter and Pushpa 2: The Rule. It was also the number one non-English film on Netflix in its first week.

Reports regarding the Netflix version were mixed, with viewers claiming that the release appeared to be censored, with several scenes cut compared to the theatrical version, and that the colour grading was inferior to that of the theatrical release. The film was reportedly downloaded 2 million times through piracy sites within a week in Pakistan, becoming the most pirated film in the country where Indian films are banned since 2019. The uncut version of the film (marketed as "Raw & Undekha") (Note: transl. Raw and Unseen) began streaming on both Netflix and JioHotstar from 22 May 2026.

== Reception ==
=== Critical reception ===
Dhurandhar received mixed reviews from critics. On the review aggregator website Rotten Tomatoes, 35% of 20 critics' reviews are positive, with an average rating of 5.80/10.

Trade analyst Taran Adarsh gave 4.5/5 stars and described the film as a "brilliant" and "power-packed" action spectacle, citing its strong storytelling and box-office appeal. Gayatri Nirmal of Pinkvilla gave 4/5 stars and praised the second-half, screenplay, and background score but criticised the runtime. Siddhant Adlakha of IGN rated the film 8/10 stars and wrote "Bollywood gangster saga Dhurandhar walks a fine line between raucous entertainment and hateful propaganda."

Renuka Vyavahare of The Times of India gave 3.5/5 stars and calling the film a "power-packed Karachi mafia thriller" where lead actor Ranveer Singh delivers a "subdued yet scorching" performance that largely anchors the film's impact. She highlighted the film's immersive world-building, the gritty, violent underworld of Karachi's Lyari mafia through a narrative structured in multiple chapters, with a runtime of nearly three-and-a-half hours that nevertheless "rarely feels overbearing", owing to what is described as "stylish, tight storytelling."

Devesh Sharma of Filmfare gave 3.5/5 stars and wrote "Aditya Dhar's Dhurandhar is a film that refuses to be contained by the grammar of a conventional spy thriller." Bollywood Hungama gave 3/5 stars and called it a well-made, ambitious big-screen experience with top-notch craft, memorable moments and some truly outstanding performances. Rishabh Suri of Hindustan Times gave 3/5 stars and described it as a "lengthy yet loaded spy drama", highlighting the performances of Ranveer Singh and Akshaye Khanna as well Aditya Dhar's direction. He also noted the film occasionally feels too long and dense with too many sub-plots.

Radhika Sharma of NDTV gave 3/5 stars and praised the cast performances and soundtrack, but criticised the second half calling it "a completely different film altogether." Taher Ahmed of Deccan Herald gave 3/5 stars and praised the performances, cinematography, and soundtrack, but criticised the runtime, pacing, and climax.

Simran Khan of Times Now gave 3/5 stars and wrote "The Aditya Dhar actioner's ending doesn't quite justify its lengthy runtime. However the adrenaline-pumping set pieces and relentless high-voltage action, paired with a background score that amplifies the drama and keeps the tension from ever dipping, make the ride worth it." Karthik Ravindranath of The Week gave 3/5 stars and wrote "The film's powerful core is diluted by overt jingoism, unnecessary elements, and a tendency to dumb down its message for the audience. Despite these irritants, it remains a largely engaging, albeit flawed, tribute to India's heroes." Vineeta Kumar of India Today gave 3/5 stars and wrote "Dhurandhar is a sprawling, muscular, politically sharp thriller that bites off a lot, and thanks to Khanna's explosive brilliance, chews most of it successfully."

Kartik Bhardwaj of The New Indian Express gave 2.5/5 stars and wrote "The Aditya Dhar directorial seems like a film which is asking for your time, so that it can lay down its cards. But then two hours have passed and the ace seems to be still far up its sleeves." Deepa Gahlot of Rediff.com gave 2.5/5 stars and wrote "Dhurandhar may not have the dark realism of a spy story, which a web show can manage. But it does not have the flamboyance either that has come to be associated with espionage movies."

Shalini Langer of The Indian Express gave 2.5/5 stars, and described the film as an "ambitious spy thriller" that ultimately works only "in flashes". She praised the film's scale, production values, and the attempt to depict the many layers of Lyari's criminal, political, and familial dynamics. However, she argued that despite its large cast and multiple narrative strands, the film only intermittently comes together, with its storytelling lacking consistency.

Sakhi Thirani of Common Sense Media gave 1/5 stars and wrote "Despite dealing with sensitive issues like terrorism and war, Dhurandhar lacks a sincere or thoughtful storyline. Instead, it's more concerned with romanticizing torture, aggression, and machismo without examining the consequences of such violence." Sadanand Dhume of The Wall Street Journal wrote "Dhurandhar is the first major Bollywood movie to realistically portray the terrorist threat India faces." Columnist Shobhaa De wrote "It's not about politics. It's about a story – perhaps fictionalised. ... I won't mind watching it all over again. Yes, three and a half hours of it." Nandini Ramnath of Scroll.in wrote "A considerable stretch of the staggering 214-minute film is no different from gangland chronicles led by swaggering, aphorism-dripping men. Hamza's rise to the top of the Karachi underworld is soaked in blood and cliche".

Athulya Nambiar of Mid-Day wrote "It's too soon to judge Dhurandhar as a good or bad film, simply because the story isn't complete yet." Anuj Kumar of The Hindu wrote "Moored by a charismatic Akshaye Khanna and a brooding Ranveer Singh, Aditya Dhar's ambitious but overstretched and chest-thumping espionage saga serves political interests, tests endurance." Rahul Desai of The Hollywood Reporter India wrote "Aditya Dhar's second film after Uri: The Surgical Strike stars Ranveer Singh as a patriotic spy trapped in an inert and distracted action thriller." Uday Bhatia of Mint wrote "Dhurandhar offers sadism and expert bad vibes and it shares something else fundamental with Dhar's previous work—it's propaganda in service of a hawkish India, designed to flatter the ruling BJP leadership."

=== Box office ===
Dhurandhar grossed ₹1,056.62 crore (US$110 million) in India and ₹293.03 crore (US$31 million) in other territories for a worldwide total of ₹1,350.83 crore (US$140 million). It is the highest grossing Indian film of 2025, third highest grossing Hindi film of all-time, fifth highest grossing Indian film of all-time and the highest grossing A certified Indian film of all time.

The film had a worldwide opening of ₹86.5 crore (US$9.2 million), which drew significant attention within the trade due to its scale and unusual daily trends. According to industry tracking, the film posted reported collections of around ₹24 crore (US$2.6 million) on release day, ₹27 crore (US$2.9 million) on the following day, and a sharp jump to ₹35.5 crore (US$3.8 million) the day after. The reported opening weekend figures were described by trade observers as unprecedented. Trade analysts estimate Dhurandhar collected approximately ₹276 crore nett within nine days of release, placing it on course for a lifetime total of over ₹500 crore nett, with some projections suggesting it could become the first original Hindi film to cross ₹600 crore nett.

Industry reports noted that, despite early adjustments to reported figures, the film's sustained second-week performance was driven largely by organic word of mouth and audience demand. Dhurandhar's second weekend and overall week performed better than first week. It earned over ₹30 crore in Hindi net on its second Monday (11th day), the highest for any Indian film. Trade reports stated Dhurandhar grossed approximately ₹880 crore worldwide within 19 days of release, placing it among the highest-grossing Hindi films globally. With only Pathaan, Jawan (both 2023) and Pushpa 2: The Rule (2024) ahead at the time, analysts projected the film was on course to surpass the ₹1,000 crore worldwide mark, with final estimates ranging between ₹1,150–1,200 crore. Strong and sustained overseas performance, particularly in markets such as the United States, Canada and Australia, was cited as a major contributor to its continued growth, alongside dominant returns from key Indian territories.

On 26 December 2025, Dhurandhar surpassed the ₹1,000 crore worldwide box-office mark, reaching an estimated ₹1,003 crore in global grosses. The milestone was achieved through ₹668.8 crore in India nett collections and ₹206.91 crore in overseas earnings, becoming the fourth Hindi film to do so, ninth overall to achieve this feat, and marking Ranveer Singh's first ₹1,000 crore global grosser.

On 7 January 2026, the film emerged as the highest-grossing film in Hindi domestic net collections with ₹895 crore Hindi net collections, highest grosser in Hindi language alone, and also the most successful Bollywood film after the COVID-pandemic. This record was beaten by its sequel Dhurandhar: The Revenge in April 2026, which grossed over ₹1000 crore. The film's foreign distributor Pranab Kapadia estimates the film lost out on US$10 million (₹90 crore) in earnings because its release was banned in Gulf countries.

== Accolades ==
| Award | Ceremony date | Category | Recipients | Result | Ref. |
|---|---|---|---|---|---|
| Zee Cine Awards | 1 March 2026 | Best Film | Dhurandhar | Nominated | |
| Zee Cine Awards | 1 March 2026 | Best Actor – Male | Ranveer Singh | Nominated | |
| Zee Cine Awards | 1 March 2026 | Song of the Year | "Dhurandhar (Title Track)" | Nominated | |
| Screen Awards | 5 April 2026 | Best Film | Dhurandhar | Nominated | |
| Screen Awards | 5 April 2026 | Best Actor | Ranveer Singh | Won | |
| Screen Awards | 5 April 2026 | Best Director | Aditya Dhar | Won | |
| Screen Awards | 5 April 2026 | Best Actor in a Supporting Role (Male) | Akshaye Khanna | Won | |
| Screen Awards | 5 April 2026 | Best Actor in a Supporting Role (Male) | Rakesh Bedi | Nominated | |
| Screen Awards | 5 April 2026 | Breakthrough New Actor (Female) | Sara Arjun | Nominated | |
| Screen Awards | 5 April 2026 | Best Action | Dhurandhar | Won | |
| Screen Awards | 5 April 2026 | Best Background Score | Shashwat Sachdev | Won | |
| Screen Awards | 5 April 2026 | Best Choreography | "Shararat" (Vijay Ganguly) | Won | |
| Screen Awards | 5 April 2026 | Best Cinematography | Vikash Nowlakha | Won | |
| Screen Awards | 5 April 2026 | Best Costume | Smriti Chauhan (Note: Shared with Sheetal Sharma (Chaava)) | Won | |
| Screen Awards | 5 April 2026 | Best Dialogue | Aditya Dhar | Won | |
| Screen Awards | 5 April 2026 | Best Editing | Shivkumar V. Panicker | Won | |
| Screen Awards | 5 April 2026 | Best Film Writing (Story & Screenplay) | Aditya Dhar | Nominated | |
| Screen Awards | 5 April 2026 | Best Hairstyling & Make-Up | Preetisheel Singh D'souza | Won | |
| Screen Awards | 5 April 2026 | Best Special Effects | Dhurandhar | Won | |
| Screen Awards | 5 April 2026 | Best Song | "Dhurandhar (Title Track)" | Nominated | |
| Screen Awards | 5 April 2026 | Best Lyrics | "Gehra Hua" (Irshad Kamil) | Nominated | |
| Screen Awards | 5 April 2026 | Best Playback Singer (Male) | "Dhurandhar Title Track" (Hanumankind, Sudhir Yaduvanshi, Shashwat Sachdev, Mohd. Sadiq) & "Gehra Hua" (Arijit Singh, Shashwat Sachdev, Armaan Khan) | Nominated | |
| Screen Awards | 5 April 2026 | Best Sound Design | Bishwadeep Chatterjee | Won | |
| Screen Awards | 5 April 2026 | Best Production Design | Saini S. Johray | Won | |
| Indian National Cine Academy Awards | 15–16 April 2026 | Best Actor - Hindi | Ranveer Singh | Won | |
| Indian National Cine Academy Awards | 15–16 April 2026 | Best Background Score | Shashwat Sachdev | Won | |
| Indian National Cine Academy Awards | 15–16 April 2026 | Best Casting | Mukesh Chhabra | Won | |
| Indian National Cine Academy Awards | 15–16 April 2026 | Best Director - Hindi | Aditya Dhar | Won | |
| Indian National Cine Academy Awards | 15–16 April 2026 | Best Editor | Shivkumar V. Panicker | Won | |

== Factual accuracy and political messaging ==
The film begins with a disclaimer stating it represents fiction, however, it repeatedly tells the audience it is inspired by real events. The film's narrative is woven around real life events, including the Kandahar hijacking, 2001 Indian Parliament attack and 2008 Mumbai attacks. It shows real footage of the Mumbai attack and audio recordings of conversations between terrorists and their handlers, and uses real-life gangsters and police based in Karachi's Lyari as its characters. Several commentators felt the blurring of the line between fact and fiction is confusing to the viewers.

Pakistani sociologist Nida Kirmani, with research expertise on Lyari, stated the film's depiction of Lyari is "completely based on fantasy". She also called it "bizarre" that the film chose to cast Lyari gangs into geopolitical tensions with India. Some residents of Lyari also criticised the inaccurate portrayal of their neighbourhood in the film. Journalists and academics in Pakistan criticised the film's linking of Lyari with the 2008 terrorist attacks in Mumbai as an attempt to "fold a Pakistani urban conflict into India's contemporary nationalist imagination".

In contrast, Sadanand Dhume, writing for The Wall Street Journal, said the movie displayed "a firm grasp of history" in its depiction of gang rivalries in Karachi and in showing "Pakistani involvement in terrorism against India." Journalist Aditya Raj Kaul stated that a March 2022 assassination of one of the IC-814 hijackers, Zahoor Mistry, was carried out by a "local Karachi gang", and that he made a documentary about it. Palak Shah confirmed the reality of the counterfeit currency network run by Karachi-based Khanani & Kalia International (KKI) and its ISI backing, later designated by the US Treasury as a "significant transnational criminal organisation".

The film's depiction of India–Pakistan relations led certain commentators to criticise its "simplistic" handling of political themes and historical context.

The film is quite explicit about its political messaging; the character of IB director Ajay Sanyal, fashioned after Ajit Doval, is shown as being frustrated with the then Indian government's weak-kneed responses to Pakistani terrorist attacks. Sanyal claims there is no point telling his superiors about a key piece of information involving counterfeit currency because widespread corruption prevails in the bureaucracy. A union minister is accused of having links to the Pakistani counterfeit racket. "Preserve the evidence, hopefully a politician comes in the future who will act", says Sanyal in a scene set in 2008, in retrospective anticipation of the coming Narendra Modi government.

The film ends with the claim about Naya Bharat ("New India"), in which Yeh ghar mein ghusega bhi, aur maarega bhi ("it will not only storm your house, but also kill every last one"), referencing a slogan from director Dhar's previous film Uri: The Surgical Strike but which was also later used in Modi's 2019 campaign speeches. Nissim Mannathukkaren, writing for The Hindu, characterised the film as propaganda as it lionises a powerful security figure of the Narendra Modi government, and proactively lauds its muscular military and counterterrorism strategies. Prathyush Parasuraman in Frontline also called it propaganda as it sets up a "translucence" of fiction and fact with the motive of trying singing paeans to the current administration of India.

The film's depiction of Pakistani characters has also been described as questionable. While they are portrayed attractively, the "rot in their moral posture becomes increasingly clear", according to Parasuraman. Unlike the Indian victims of violence who are clearly humanised, the Pakistani victims are dealt with in a gory manner and eschewing any sympathy. A 'butcher' aesthetic was applied to an entire Karachi neighbourhood, and the Muslims of the subcontinent appear to be equated with 'barbarians'.

The device of splicing in transcripts of actual conversations of the Mumbai attack terrorists typed on a red screen, which was highlighted by many commentators, is seen by some as an effort to incite anger. The Pakistani characters are uniformly shown to be rejoicing in India's horror, chanting "Allah hu Akbar" as if "cruelty were devotion". Some reviewers read Islamophobia into the treatment of Muslims.

== In popular culture ==
The widely discussed dialogue, "Ghayal hoon, isiliye Ghatak hoon" (transl. I am Wounded, which is why I am Lethal), delivered by Ranveer Singh's character Hamza, was incorporated into Dhurandhar as a tribute to Sunny Deol's iconic persona. The dialogue sparked widespread nostalgia on social media, with fans celebrating it as a callback to Sunny Deol's celebrated 1990s films Ghayal and Ghatak. Another popular dialogue, "Mera Baccha Hai Tu" (transl. You are my child) delivered by Rakesh Bedi's character, Jameel Jamali, throughout the Dhurandhar films, went viral across social media, becoming a popular fixture in memes and short-form video clips.

== Sequel ==
Initially planned as a single film, Dhurandhar was eventually split into two parts. The film's post-credits scene teases a sequel later titled as Dhurandhar: The Revenge, exploring the events that took place at the end of the first part. Dhurandhar: The Revenge was released worldwide on 19 March 2026, coinciding with Gudi Padwa, Ugadi, and Eid al-Fitr. Alongside its original Hindi language, it was also released in the Telugu, Tamil, Malayalam, and Kannada languages.
