= Dhurandhar: The Revenge =

2026 Indian film by Aditya Dhar

- Theatrical release poster
- Directed by: Aditya Dhar
- Written by: Aditya Dhar
- Additional screenplay: Ojas Gautam; Shivkumar V. Panicker
- Produced by: Aditya Dhar; Lokesh Dhar; Jyoti Deshpande
- Starring: Ranveer Singh; Arjun Rampal; Sanjay Dutt; R. Madhavan; Sara Arjun; Rakesh Bedi; Gaurav Gera; Danish Pandor
- Cinematography: Vikash Nowlakha
- Edited by: Shivkumar V. Panicker
- Music by: Shashwat Sachdev
- Production companies: Jio Studios; B62 Studios
- Distributed by: Jio Studios
- Release date: 19 March 2026
- Running time: 229 minutes (Note: The theatrical runtime of the film was 229 minutes. However, on OTT, the uncensored version was released with an extension of +3 minutes (232 minutes).)
- Country: India
- Language: Hindi
- Budget: ₹250–255 crore (combined with part 1)
- Box office: ₹1,852.44 crore

Dhurandhar: The Revenge (Note: transl. Stalwart: The Revenge) is a 2026 Indian Hindi-language spy action-thriller film written and directed by Aditya Dhar. It is produced by Dhar, Lokesh Dhar, and Jyoti Deshpande under Jio Studios and B62 Studios. It is a sequel to the 2025 film Dhurandhar and the final installment of a duology. The film stars Ranveer Singh, Arjun Rampal, Sanjay Dutt, R. Madhavan, Sara Arjun, Rakesh Bedi, Gaurav Gera, Danish Pandor, and Manav Gohil, with several actors reprising their roles from the first film. It follows an undercover Indian intelligence agent who continues to infiltrate Karachi's criminal syndicates and Pakistani politics while avenging the 26/11 attacks and confronting larger threats.

The film's storyline loosely incorporates multiple real-life geopolitical events and conflicts in South Asia, including Operation Lyari, the 2014 Indian general election, and the 2016 Indian banknote demonetisation. Shot back-to-back alongside the first film, principal photography began in July 2024 in Bangkok, Thailand, and concluded in October 2025. Filming took place across Punjab, Chandigarh, Maharashtra, Ladakh, Himachal Pradesh, and Thailand, with some areas doubling for Pakistan-set sequences. Shashwat Sachdev composed the film's soundtrack. With a runtime of 229 minutes, it is among the longest Indian films ever produced.

Dhurandhar: The Revenge was released in theatres worldwide on 19 March 2026, coinciding with the celebrations of Gudi Padwa, Ugadi, and Eid. The film received mixed reviews, with praise for its performances, storytelling, soundtrack, and technical aspects, with criticism for its levels of violence and for containing alleged nationalist propaganda. Like its predecessor, it was banned in all Gulf Cooperation Council countries. Commercially, the film became a major box office success, grossing over ₹1,000 crore worldwide within its first week of release, as well as outgrossing its predecessor by several hundred crores. Grossing over ₹1,800 crore worldwide, it emerged as the second-highest-grossing Indian film of all time, the second-highest-grossing Hindi-language film worldwide, the highest-grossing Hindi-language film domestically, and the highest grossing A-rated Indian film of all time.

== Plot ==
In 2000, Jaskirat Singh Rangi leaves his hometown in Pathankot for military training. During his absence, a land dispute involving local MLA Sukhwinder Singh results in a brutal attack on his family. His father is hanged, his elder sister is gang raped and murdered, and his younger sister Jasleen is abducted. Jaskirat travels to Uttar Pradesh with his friend Gurbaaz, the son of a narcotics smuggler, and meets mafia don and politician Atif Ahmed, from whom they purchase weapons and ammunition. Jaskirat single-handedly attacks Sukhwinder's mansion, kills him and his gang members, and rescues Jasleen. Arrested and sentenced to death, he entrusts her care to Gurbaaz before his imprisonment.

In 2002, Jaskirat is abducted during a prison transfer and brought before intelligence officials Ajay Sanyal and Sushant Bansal. They persuade him to channel his grief into serving his country by infiltrating Pakistani terror networks. Given the identity of Hamza Ali Mazari, he travels through Kabul to Lyari, where he begins his undercover mission under handler Mohammed Aalam. (Note: As depicted in Dhurandhar (2025))

In 2009, following the death of Rehman Dakait in Lyari, Hamza exploits rivalries between Baloch and Pathan gangs, provoking a conflict that kills Pathan leader Arshad Pappu and leads to the arrest of Rehman's cousin Uzair Baloch. Hamza consequently becomes a dominant force in Karachi's underworld and enters the circle of "Bade Sahab", a gravely ill, bedridden Dawood Ibrahim. Dawood tasks him with smuggling narcotics into India to finance further terrorist operations.

Punjabi rebels arrive to assist the operation, and Hamza recognises Gurbaaz among them. Now a drug-addicted and violent smuggler, Gurbaaz reveals during a party that he recognised Hamza immediately, has married Jasleen and started a family with her, and inherited his father's trafficking business. Unconcerned about the terrorists' intentions, Hamza's efforts to persuade Gurbaaz to reconsider fail as he threatens to expose Hamza's identity, and his drug-induced hallucinations trigger a fight in which he accidentally kills himself. Aalam helps conceal the incident but asks Hamza to kill him if capture becomes inevitable. Discovered beside Gurbaaz's body, Aalam is killed by Hamza in front of the guests. That night, Hamza's wife, Yalina, discovers his identity. He justifies his mission by citing atrocities committed by Pakistan's leadership against India and its own citizens, persuading her to remain silent for their son, Zayan's sake.

Suspicious of Hamza, SP Chaudhary Aslam investigates him but is killed in a suicide attack orchestrated by Hamza through the Balochistan United Force (BUF). Following Narendra Modi's victory in the general elections, Sanyal meets Hamza in Dubai and authorises him to dismantle the remaining terror network. Sanyal also proposes 'Operation Green Leaf', the demonetisation of high-denomination banknotes. Hamza assassinates key figures, including terror financier and counterfeit-currency producer Javed Khanani, whose operation is crippled by demonetisation, and IC 814 hijacker Zahoor Mistry. Sanyal witnesses Mistry's death over a video call. Meanwhile, imprisoned Atif Ahmed is assassinated by unknown gunmen during a live news broadcast, shocking Major Iqbal, Sajid Mir and others.

Aslam's second-in-command Omar discovers Hamza's identity by threatening Zayan and interrogating Yalina, then informs Iqbal. When Dawood prepares an attack on India, Hamza delivers weapons to Iqbal's madrassa in Muridke. Iqbal identifies him as an Indian spy and stabs him, but explosives planted in the weapons crates kill several militants. A firefight breaks out between Iqbal's Mujahideen and the BUF, disguised as Pakistan Rangers. Hamza destroys Iqbal's transport with an RPG, orders the madrassa destroyed, and pursues Iqbal to a shipping yard, where he kills him in a kerosene tanker explosion.

After a final phone call with Yalina, Hamza is captured and tortured by Omar. Sanyal secures his release by blackmailing Pakistani intelligence chief Shamshad Hassan with evidence of his dealings with Israeli intelligence. Hamza recommends framing Uzair as an Indian spy to divert suspicion.

Hamza's father-in-law, Jameel Jamali, collects him and reveals that he has long been an Indian asset, secretly poisoning Dawood while embedded in his network. With his mission complete, Hamza abandons his alias and returns to India as Jaskirat Singh Rangi, leaving Yalina and Zayan behind to protect them. Although commended for his service, he disappears before his formal debriefing and returns to the vicinity of his childhood home, gazing at it wistfully from afar.

In the mid-credits scene, flashbacks depict Jaskirat's training with the Research & Analysis Wing (R&AW). In the post-credits scene, Shamshad orders Omar's confinement in a mental asylum after Omar threatens to expose Shamshad's role in securing Hamza's release to the National Assembly.

== Cast ==
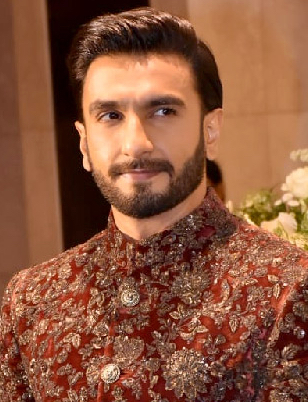
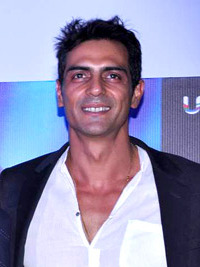
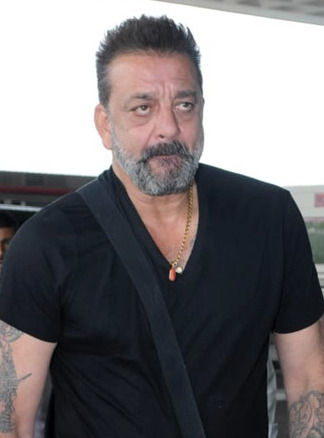
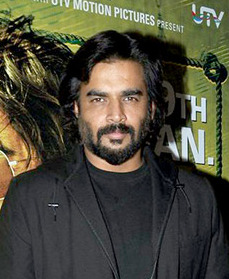
From left to right: Ranveer Singh, Arjun Rampal, Sanjay Dutt and R. Madhavan reprise key roles from the first film.
- Ranveer Singh as Hamza Ali Mazari / Jaskirat Singh Rangi
- Arjun Rampal as Major Iqbal, ISI (based on Ilyas Kashmiri and Major Iqbal)
- Sanjay Dutt as SSP Chaudhary Aslam, Lyari Task Force (LTF), Sindh Police
- R. Madhavan as Ajay Sanyal, Director of IB (based on Ajit Doval)
- Sara Arjun as Yalina Jamali, Hamza's wife
- Rakesh Bedi as Jameel Jamali, Yalina's father; a senior politician of the Pakistani Awami Party (PAP) and Member of the National Assembly of Pakistan (based on Nabil Gabol and Altaf Hussain)
- Gaurav Gera as Mohammed Aalam, a juice shop owner in Lyari and Hamza's handler
- Manav Gohil as Sushant Bansal, Deputy Director of the IB
- Danish Pandor as Uzair Baloch, leader of the Baloch gang
- Bimal Oberoi as Shirani, leader of the Balochistan United Force (BUF)
- Danish Iqbal as Dawood Ibrahim / Bade Sahab
- Raj Zutshi as Lt. General Shamshad Hassan, Director General of the ISI
- Udaybir Sandhu as Gurbaaz "Pinda" Singh (based on Harvinder Singh Sandhu "Rinda")
- Mustafa Ahmed as Rizwan Shah
- Madhurjeet Sarghi as Prabneet Kaur Rangi, Jaskirat's mother
- Aditya Uppal as ASP Omar Haider (based on Omar Shahid Hamid), LTF
- Salim Siddiqui as Atif Ahmed (based on Atiq Ahmed)
- Ram Chander as Ashfaq Ahmed (based on Khalid Azim)
- Ashwin Dhar as Arshad Pappu, leader of the Pathan gang
- Abhay Arora as Yasir Arafat, Pappu's younger brother
- Ankit Sagar as Javed Khanani, co-founder of Khanani & Kalia International (KKI)
- Vinod Tharani as Azam Cheema
- Faiz Khan as Sajid Mir
- Sanjay Mehta as Abdul Bhuttovi
- Rajesh Dogra as Abdul Rehman Makki
- Suvinder Vicky as Brigadier Jahangir, Iqbal's father
- Saumya Tandon as Ulfat, Rehman's widow
- Umarr Navid Nirban as Zayan, Hamza and Yalina's son
- Pari Pandher as Jasleen Kaur Rangi
- Hitika Bali as Harleen Kaur Rangi
- Aashish Duggal as MLA Sukhwinder Singh
- Bhasha Sumbli as Lawyer Veena
- Vijender Singh as Amarjit Singh (based on Paramjeet Singh Panjwar)
- Vivek Sinha as Zahoor Mistry (based on Zahid Akhund)
- Amandeep Singh as Sunpreet Singh "Sunny DVD" (based on Harmeet Singh)
- Neha Pawar as Black Site Agent / Chemistry Teacher
- Mashhoor Amrohi as Nawab Shafiq (based on Nawaz Sharif)
- Sanjay Mehandiratta as Aquib Ali Zarwari, President of Pakistan and leader of the PAP (based on Asif Ali Zardari)
- Himanshu Gokhani as DGP Sanjay Kumar, Uttar Pradesh Police (based on DGP Prashant Kumar)
- Akshaye Khanna as Rehman Dakait (archival footage)
- Yami Gautam as Shazia Bano (Note: Gautam played the role of an undercover Indian agent in disguise of a nurse. The character's name was a reference to her 2025 film Haq in which she played the role of Shazia Bano (modelled after Shah Bano).) (cameo appearance)

== Production ==
The sequel was developed as the second and final installment of the Dhurandhar duology. Initially planned as a single film, the filmmakers later decided on a two-part release. Both parts were shot concurrently as a single production. The decision to divide the film was made during post-production, owing to the volume of footage and narrative complexity. Principal photography for both films took place between July 2024 and October 2025 across India and Thailand. Additional filming for the second part took place in January and February 2026.

== Music ==
The soundtrack was composed by Shashwat Sachdev, with lyrics written by Irshad Kamil and Kumaar. The music rights were acquired by T-Series for ₹27 crore, replacing Saregama.

The song "Aaahh Men!" by Doja Cat was featured in the teaser released on 3 February 2026, and also appears in the film. The first single, "Aari Aari", was released on 12 March 2026. The song is a remix of the 2003 eponymous track by Danish musical duo Bombay Rockers and featured in the film's trailer. The second single, "Main Aur Tu", was released on 17 March 2026. The full album was launched the same day at the NESCO Centre in Mumbai. An extended album with eleven additional tracks was released on 24 March 2026.

Reviewers generally found the soundtrack effective in enhancing the film's impact, though some noted it fell short of the energy of the first film's score.

== Marketing ==
A post-credits scene in the first instalment revealed the title and release date for the sequel. Initial reports suggested the teaser would be screened alongside Border 2 in theatres on 30 January 2026, but this did not materialise. The teaser was later released on 3 February 2026, using footage that had also appeared in the post-credits scene of the first part. The official trailer was released on 7 March 2026 and received great response from audience. Within 48 hours, the trailer received more than 312 million views across all social media platforms.

== Release ==
=== Theatrical ===
Dhurandhar: The Revenge was released worldwide on 19 March 2026, coinciding with Gudi Padwa, Ugadi, and Eid al-Fitr. Alongside its original Hindi language, it was also released in Telugu, Tamil, Malayalam, and Kannada. The film received an A (adults only) certificate from the CBFC for strong violence, with a final runtime of 229 minutes after some violent scenes and profanities were cut. Overseas screenings ran for 235 minutes. Paid preview shows were scheduled on the evening of 18 March in all languages, though several screenings were delayed or cancelled; Kannada and Malayalam shows were particularly affected by technical and censorship-related issues. Like its predecessor, the film was banned across Gulf Cooperation Council countries. On 30 March 2026, a revised print was sent to the theatres after makers rectified some technical mistakes alongside the censoring of certain abuses in the dialogues.

=== Home media ===
The post-theatrical digital streaming rights across India were acquired by JioHotstar for ₹150 crore. In international territories, the film's uncut version (marketed as "Raw & Undekha") (Note: transl. Raw and Unseen) was released on Netflix on 15 May 2026. The uncut version included all unmuted cuss words, extended gory scenes, and some minor changes in several sequences. In India, the film's uncut version was released on JioHotstar on 5 June 2026. A day earlier, on 4 June, the film's grand digital premiere also took place on the platform along with interviews and candid conversations with the film's cast. Later, the film was also released on Netflix in India on 19 June 2026.

== Reception ==
=== Critical response ===
Dhurandhar: The Revenge received mixed reviews from critics. On the review aggregator website Rotten Tomatoes, 36% of 22 critics' reviews are positive, with an average rating of 6.10/10. Many reviews from international publications criticised the film for both its violence and politics.

Nicolas Rapold, writing for The New York Times, said the film "amps up the ultraviolence and the provocative mingling of heroic theatrics with India-Pakistan history." Sowmya Rajendran, writing for Newslaundry, noted that despite its pro-establishment messaging the first film worked across ideological lines due to strong storytelling, and found the sequel "angrier, louder, and more blatant in its messaging" and "emptier". Shahana Yasmin of The Independent wrote that for some viewers the blend of history and mythmaking creates an immersive patriotic thriller, while for others it blurs the line between history and propaganda. IGN reviewer Siddhant Adlakha characterised the film as "in favor of naked political propaganda".

Agnivo Niyogi, writing for The Telegraph, wrote the film "has more gore, more violence and brazen propaganda" and "lacks the finesse that Dhurandhar at least could boast of." Trade analyst Taran Adarsh gave the film 4.5/5 stars and described it as a "masterpiece" and praised its scale, drama, emotions, action, performances and overall impact. Bollywood Hungama also gave the film 4.5 out of 5 stars, saying its emotional core distinguished it from the spectacle. Rishabh Suri of Hindustan Times rated it 4 out of 5, describing it as "a roller-coaster thriller that may not match the first film's precision but is elevated by Ranveer Singh's powerful performance and a gripping second half." Radhika Sharma of NDTV rated it 3 out of 5. Divya Nair of Rediff.com gave the film 4 out of 5 stars, calling it "an engaging, twist-filled entertainer with layered storytelling and strong impact, despite its politics, gore, and inconsistencies." Chirag Sehgal of News18 rated it 3.5 out of 5, noting a gripping plot with several narrative twists. Nandini Ramnath, writing for Scroll, compared the film to Marco, L2: Empuraan, and K.G.F: Chapter 2, but with what she described as pro-government propaganda woven into the action.

Shubhra Gupta of The Indian Express gave the film 2 out of 5, writing that it fails to match the first part and that the hyper-nationalism and hyper-masculinity quickly blur together. Vineeta Kumar of India Today awarded 3.5 out of 5 stars, calling it "loud, unapologetic, and absolutely certain of itself" while crediting the film with a consistent cinematic voice. Renuka Vyavahare of The Times of India rated it 3 out of 5, describing it as "a relentless action extravaganza teetering on excess." Mayank Shekhar of Mid-Day rated it 3.5 out of 5. Sajin Shrijith of The Week rated it 3.5 out of 5, finding the film "longer and paced differently compared to its predecessor," with the third act feeling stretched. Nonika Singh of The Tribune gave the film 3 out of 5, writing that violence is "its default setting."

Tatsam Mukherjee of The Wire wrote that the film uses real-life traumas to fuel ideological messaging that is "less fictitious than Dhar and his crew would care to address." Anuj Kumar of The Hindu wrote that the film "roars, but in its deafening cocktail of patriotism and propaganda, it forgets the quiet cost of humanity." Mamta Raut of Mashable India called the film "a paradox," describing it as a competently executed spy thriller that "leans heavily into propaganda." Lachmi Deb Roy of Firstpost rated it 3.5 out of 5, calling it "engaging, immersive, and ferociously intense" while noting the action was purposeful rather than gratuitous. Devesh Sharma of Filmfare.com gave 3.5 out of 5, describing the film as "a loud, gory, hyper-nationalistic spectacle that storms in with scale and swagger but forgets the value of brevity."

Kartik Bhardwaj of Cinema Express labelled it "a masterful, stylish piece of mythmaking that mixes gripping storytelling with heavy political messaging." Gayatri Nirmal of Pinkvilla praised the execution while observing that the second chapter "feels slightly sluggish" and the background score does not match the impact of the first instalment. Srujani Mohinta of Zee News described it as fitting the category of a mass entertainer with emotionally charged sequences. Sneha Bengani of CNBC TV18 called it a spectacle-heavy sequel driven by Ranveer Singh's screen presence but weighed down by thin characterisation and an excessive runtime. Sakshi Salil Chavan of Outlook gave 2 out of 5 stars, writing that the film "leans heavily into gore, violence and strong pro-government messaging" but "falls short of recreating the rich worldbuilding that defined the first film."

=== Box office ===
Dhurandhar: The Revenge grossed over ₹1,852 crore (US$200 million) worldwide, becoming the second-highest-grossing Indian film of all time. It collected ₹1,361 crore (US$150 million) in India and ₹475.93 crore (US$51 million) in overseas market without releasing in GCC countries and China. The film recorded final footfalls of over 4 crore admissions during its theatrical run. It eventually became the second-highest-grossing Hindi-language film worldwide, the highest-grossing Hindi-language film domestically, the third-highest-grossing film in India, the highest-grossing Indian film of 2026 and the ninth-highest-grossing film of 2026 overall worldwide.

The film grossed ₹75 crore from paid previews on 18 March 2026, a day before the official release of the film, breaking the previous Indian record held by Stree 2 (2024) and They Call Him OG (2025). The film earned ₹130–174 crore on its opening day 19 March 2026, 196–240 crore worldwide including the previous day's premieres. This marked the highest opening day for a Bollywood film, surpassing the previous record held by Adipurush. The global opening weekend gross was over $80 million, only behind Project Hail Mary. By the end of its opening weekend, the film had earned ₹759.91 crore worldwide, with overseas earnings of around ₹209.60 crore. The film's global earnings reached ₹1,435 crore by the end of its second weekend and crossed ₹1,500 crore in its second week. It was the fastest Indian film to cross ₹1,500 crore worldwide.

On 5 April 2026, the film became the first Indian film to cross $25 million in North America and the highest-grossing Indian film in Germany. On 6 April, the film became the first Hindi film to cross ₹1,000 crore net collections in India across all languages. The combined worldwide gross of the Dhurandhar duology surprassed ₹3,203 crore (US$340 million), and it has been called the highest grossing Indian film franchise, surpassing Baahubali and Pushpa franchise. India Today reported that Dhurandhar: The Revenge has emerged as the highest-grossing Indian film worldwide excluding China and GCC countries; where the film wasn't released. In overseas market, In its fifth week of release, the film became the highest grossing Indian film in UK, Australia and New Zealand with £4.388 million, $8.255 million and $1.295 million respectively.

== Factual accuracy and political messaging ==
The film opens with a disclaimer stating that it is a work of fiction inspired by real events and should not be construed as an accurate depiction of historical fact. Despite this, the film incorporates several real-life terrorist attacks on India into its plot and reimagines events and public figures from recent Indian political history, including the 2016 Indian banknote demonetisation and a fictionalised version of slain politician and gangster Atiq Ahmed.

Several reviewers questioned the accuracy of specific factual claims. Dainik Bhaskar reported that the film's depiction of the Atiq Ahmed-based character as involved in a counterfeit currency racket was contradicted by chargesheets filed by Uttar Pradesh Police, and that the film's timeline of events surrounding his arrest was incorrect. The film also presents as established fact an unproven claim linking that character to weapons smuggling connected with Lashkar-e-Taiba and the ISI. The Federal noted that no documentation corroborated any Pakistani link beyond statements by Uttar Pradesh Police. The Indian Express described the director's approach as blending real events with fiction as a deliberate storytelling device.

The film attracted significant critical commentary regarding its political framing. Variety wrote that the film intensifies existing patriotic sentiment and that its level of violence places it above other recent examples of anti-Muslim narrative in Indian cinema. The Federal found that the film implies membership of any party opposed to the Bharatiya Janata Party (BJP) is tantamount to receiving Pakistani funding. The Economist noted that professional critics on Rotten Tomatoes broadly characterised both films as propaganda for Narendra Modi. Nissim Mannathukkaren, writing for The Hindu, argued that the film conflates the ruling party with the state, rendering other forms of political violence invisible while spectacularising nationalist violence. Prathyush Parasuraman, writing for Frontline, argued that the film instrumentalises both Pakistani and Indian minorities within a nationalist framework. Siddhant Adlakha, writing for IGN, argued that the film's repeated incorporation of real political events into its fictional narrative risks inflaming tensions around India-Pakistan relations and the treatment of Indian Muslims. Vineeta Kumar, writing for India Today, argued that the film's target is Pakistani state-sponsored terrorism rather than Pakistan or Muslims broadly, and that its position aligns with that of the Indian government.

The Independent reported divided audience opinion and suggested the film's commercial success may reinforce hypermasculine nationalism as a durable formula in mainstream Hindi cinema. The film received characterisations from professional critics including "naked political propaganda", "pro-establishment propaganda", "pro-government propaganda", and "brazen propaganda".

Not all commentators accepted the propaganda characterisation. Yasser Usman, writing for NDTV, argued the film should be understood within the tradition of the Bollywood masala film rather than treated as a political manifesto. Nirmalya Dutta, writing for The Times of India, questioned whether the propaganda label was being applied consistently across films. Writing for Open, a commentator argued that similarly partial readings could be applied to acclaimed Western films such as Saving Private Ryan and Zero Dark Thirty.

== In popular culture ==
The dialogue "Mera Baccha Hai Tu" (transl. you are my child), spoken by the character Jameel Jamali (Rakesh Bedi) in both Dhurandhar films, gained circulation on social media and in memes and short-form video content. Several brands and agencies, including Delhi Police, Wai Wai, Haldiram's, and Vadilal, adapted the dialogue for marketing campaigns.
