= Vikash Nowlakha =

Indian cinematographer

- Education: University of Tasmania; New York Film Academy
- Occupation: Cinematographer
- Years active: 1997–present
- Website: vikashnowlakha.com

Vikash Nowlakha is an Indian cinematographer and filmmaker who works in Hindi films. He has worked as a director of photography for feature films like Rocket Singh: Salesman of the Year (2009), Laapataa Ladies (2024), Dhurandhar (2025) and its sequel Dhurandhar: The Revenge (2026). In addition to his work in films, he has also shot TV commercials worldwide for the New York Knicks, Nike Jordan, Maserati, BMW, Fevicol and Ambuja Cements and various other International brands, which have garnered several awards and accolades.

== Early life ==
Vikash Nowlakha graduated in Philosophy from the University of Tasmania (1997). In 2001, he enrolled at the New York Film Academy to study cinematography.

== Career ==
Nowlakha began his professional journey in the film industry in 1997 after moving to Mumbai, where he took up his first role as an assistant director at an advertising production house.

In the late 1990s, he served as a producer at MTV, which sparked his interest in visual storytelling.

Over the following decade, he built experience in commercial filmmaking. His early work primarily involved television commercials for international automotive brands including Maserati, BMW, Buick, Chevrolet, Yamaha, Lexus, Honda, Škoda, Vespa and Fiat, as well as campaigns for Nike, Adidas, Fevicol, Ambuja Cements, and the NBA team New York Knicks.

Nowlakha gained wider recognition in 2009 with the film Rocket Singh: Salesman of the Year, directed by Shimit Amin.

After a period largely focused on advertising, he returned to major long-form projects with the documentary The Year Earth Changed (2021), narrated by David Attenborough. In 2022, he worked on the BBC series The Green Planet, the Hindi web series Bloody Brothers, and the fantasy film Brahmāstra: Part One – Shiva, directed by Ayan Mukerji.

In 2024, he served as director of photography for Laapataa Ladies, directed by Kiran Rao. For his work on the film, he received the Best Cinematography award at the 2025 Zee Cine Awards and a nomination at the 70th Filmfare Awards. The film was selected as the Indian entry for the Best International Feature Film for the 97th Academy Awards.

In 2025, he received critical acclaim for his cinematography on Dhurandhar - the highest-grossing Hindi film in India as of 2026, and is also credited on its sequel Dhurandhar: The Revenge (2026).

== Filmography ==
Year	Film	Language	Notes	Ref.
2007	Dus Kahaniyaan	Hindi		
2008	Woodstock Villa	Hindi		
2009	Rocket Singh: Salesman of the Year	Hindi		
2021	The Year Earth Changed	English	Documentary	
2022	The Green Planet	English	Television series	
2022	Bloody Brothers	Hindi	Web series	
2022	Brahmāstra: Part One – Shiva	Hindi		
2024	Laapataa Ladies	Hindi		
2025	Dhurandhar	Hindi		
2026	Dhurandhar: The Revenge	Hindi		

== Awards and nominations ==
Year	Award	Category	Result	Film	Ref.
2025	2025 Zee Cine Awards	Best Cinematography	Won	Laapataa Ladies	
2025	70th Filmfare Awards	Best Cinematography	Nominated	Laapataa Ladies	
