= Operation Lyari =

Anti-crime operation in Karachi, Pakistan

Lyari Operation
- Part of MQM violence (1994–2016), MQM militancy, Organized crime, Karachi gang wars and operations
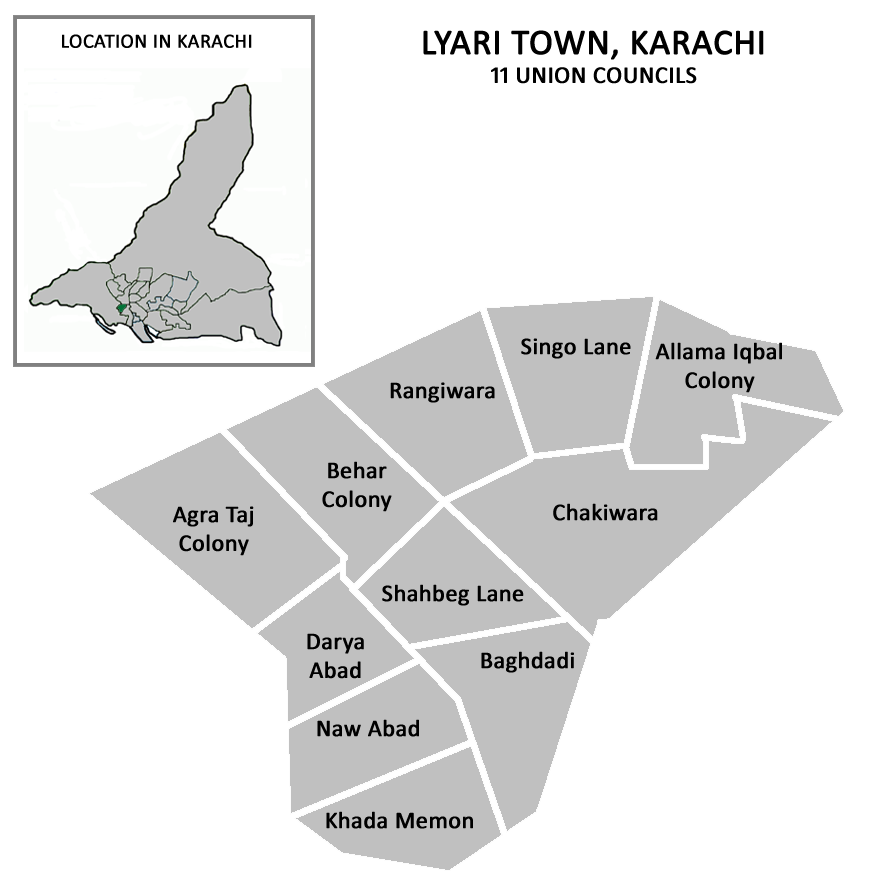
Date	24 April–4 May 2012; 7 September 2013–20 August 2023
Location	Lyari, Karachi, Sindh, Pakistan
Result	Sindh government victory: Sindh Police fail to infiltrate Lyari; Sindh Rangers lead the Operation; Lyari records an 80% decline in crime rate; Large scale gang wars mostly cease; Significant caches of weapons and ammunition seized; Low intensity violence continues

Belligerents
Pakistan; Civil Armed Forces; Pakistan Rangers; Sindh Rangers; ATW; Federal Constabulary; Pakistan Police; Sindh Police; SSU; Lyari Task Force; CTD; Pakistani Intelligence community; NACTA; IB; FIA; SB	Lyari Syndicates and Parties: People's Aman Committee (PAC); Lyari Aman Committee (LAC) (Splinter group of PAC); Radical Balochis; Jhengu Group; Taju Group; Faisal Pathan Group; Wasiullah Lakho Group; Sipah-e-Sahaba Pakistan; Political Support: PPP (until 2013); MQM-L (until 2015)

Commanders and leaders
FIA: Saud Ahmad Mirza; CID & Lyari Task Force (LTF): SSP Chaudhary Aslam (Sindh Police) †; IG Sindh Mushtaq Shah; AIG Shahid Hayat; DIG Javed Odho; DSP A.S Mirani SHO Sajjad Mangi; SHO Zulfiqar Lashari SHO Aslam Rajput; Ghulam Sibtain †; Former: Rehman Malik; Hassan Soomro † Chakiwara SHO Frontier Corps; Major-General Ejaz Shahid Inter-Services Intelligence; Lt. Gen. Rizwan Akhtar	Rehman Dakait †; Uzair Baloch (POW) Faction: Faisal Pathan (POW); Jabbar Jhengu; Sana Baloch †; Billu Dakait; Chooha Khan; Sheraz Comrad †; Hamza Ali Mazari †; Amjad Lashari †; Eyebrow Singh Khashrann †; Salman Dada †; Aadi Baloch †; Mulla Nazeer †; Murga Aslam; Kamran Kami Baloch; Naeem Lahoti †; Mullah Sohail †; Ali Daad Zigri; Fallicle Khanzada; Rajat Rand (POW); Noor Mohammad, Baba Ladla † Faction: Zahid Ladla; Shahid Rehman; Shakeel Commando; Sikander Sikku; Nasir Khan †; Gul Mohammad †; Basit alias Maut †; Moosa Baloch †; Yousuf Gojji †; Mairaj Baloch †; Younus Baloch †; Ustad Taju; Mullah Nisar; Umer Kutchi; Wasiullah Lakho; Shafi Pathan; Ismail Afhani; Shakir Ali alias Shakir Dada †

Units involved
CID (Counter-Terrorist Force): Police Commandos; Lyari Task Force (LTF); Special Branch, Police (SBP); Anti-Extremist Cell (AEC)	Crime syndicate leaders; Militants; Terrorists; Gangsters; Target Killers

Strength
Unknown	Unknown

Casualties and losses
Unknown	Unknown

Operation Lyari (Urdu: جرّاحت لیاری, romanized: Jarr'āhat Lyāri) was a Pakistani government crackdown against crime syndicates, terrorist groups and other local gangs based in the town of Lyari within Karachi in the 2010s and early 2020s, and part of the greater Karachi Operation.

== Background ==
=== Historical factors ===
Karachi is a cosmopolitan city and the biggest city of Pakistan; its population is more than 20 million and includes many ethnic communities. The city's demographics play an important role in its politics. Ethnic politics have resulted in sporadic violence throughout Karachi's history, often leading to bloody conflicts. After the independence of Pakistan in 1947, Muslim immigrants from areas constituting modern-day India migrated in large numbers to the newly created Muslim nation of Pakistan and became settled in Karachi, the historical capital of the Sindh province. These migrants came to be known as Muhajir people (Muhajir meaning "immigrant") with their mother tongue as Urdu. They dominated much of Karachi's businesses, something which was feared and resented by many of the province's native Sindhi people and radical Sindhi nationalists. After the breakaway of East Pakistan in 1971 and the formation of Bangladesh, Pakistan accepted a large number of Biharis (known as "Stranded Pakistanis") loyal to the country, trapped in Bangladesh and offered them citizenship. The Bihari migrants assimilated into the diverse Muhajir population. Some Bengalis in Pakistan also stayed behind. The Pashtuns (Pathans), originally from Khyber Pakhtunkhwa, FATA and northern Balochistan, are now the city's second largest ethnic group in Karachi after Muhajirs. With as high as 7 million by some estimates, the city of Karachi in Pakistan has the largest concentration of urban Pashtun population in the world, including 50,000 registered Afghan refugees in the city. As per current demographic ratio Pashtuns are about 25% of Karachi's population.

Karachi's status as a regional industrial centre attracted migrants from other parts of Pakistan as well, including Punjab, Balochistan and Pashtun migrants from the frontier regions. Added to this were Iranians, Arabs, Central Asians as well as thousands of Afghan refugees who came to Karachi, initially displaced by the Soviet invasion of Afghanistan; some of the Afghan and Pashtun migration brought along conservative tribal culture, further intensifying ethnic and sectarian violence and also giving rise to mob culture.

==== Ethnic differences ====
There are several ethnic groups in Lyari including Sindhis, Kashmiris, Saraikis, Pashtuns, Balochis, Memons, Musta'li/Dawoodi Bohra Ismailis, etc. other than Muhajirs. The ethnic mix has resulted in political parties being affiliated with specific communities. Examples are;

- Muttahida Qaumi Movement (MQM) was founded for the political interests of the Muhajir people in urban Sindh, particularly Karachi.
- Pakistan People's Party (PPP) was popular among Sindhis & Balochis and Lyari in particular was (PPP) stronghold.

==== Religious and sectarian differences ====
Sectarian parties and Sunni–Shia conflict have also led to violence in this district with many wanted terrorists hiding out in Lyari.

== Operations in 2012 ==
Lyari had long been a stronghold of Pakistan Peoples' Party (PPP). The PPP took under its wing a well known gangster named Abdul-Rehman Baloch, alias Rehman Dakait, to keep the Lyari vote bank in check by not allowing other parties access to Lyari. In exchange Rehman Dakait would be allowed a free rein to extort local businesses, smuggle drugs, arms and ammunition. This agreement was the brainchild of Zulfiqar Mirza and then President Asif Ali Zardari who placed Rehman Dakait as the leader of a newly formed Peoples' Aman Committee in 2008 to look after the affairs of Lyari and to regulate crime in his territory. He brought down petty crime and became a local hero. Despite his enhanced reputation he went on his own crime spree unchecked and became the undisputed crime boss in Lyari. He soon fell out with the PPP, by 2009 he was a wanted man and was killed in a police encounter in August 2009.

The People's Aman Committee was then taken over by his first cousin and partner in crime Uzair Jan Baloch. Uzair was an ardent enemy of MQM and after several targeted killings came under pressure from the PPP to disband. Despite being officially defunct, the organization continued to function de facto on the ground. The government finally issued a notification on 11 October 2011, which banned the Peoples' Aman Committee under Clause (11/B) of Anti-terrorism Act 1997. The Sindh Home Ministry, after banning the People's Aman Committee (PAC), finally issued its notification. Additionally, the ministry directed law enforcement agencies to monitor the activities of the committee.

Uzair Jan Baloch had become a serious liability for PPP. A member of his gang, Saqib alias Sakhi, was killed in police encounter on 1 April 2012. Uzair Jan and many of his colleagues were also booked by the police for the murder of a policeman. Rival gangs began to kill his men. Uzair Jan felt betrayed and blamed the current activism against him on the PPP politicians of Lyari such as Malik Mohammad Khan along with National Assembly member from Lyari Nabil Gabol and MPA Saleem Hingoro. Uzair Jan Baloch on 26 April 2012, assassinated Malik Mohammad Khan while he was leading a procession of party activists against the conviction of Prime Minister Yousuf Raza Gilani by the Supreme Court in a contempt case. The Interior Minister Rehman Malik after conferring with the President and other PPP members decided to start an operation to seize and destroy the Lyari gangs.

The Lyari operation commenced on 27 April 2012. Uzair's house was raided, with the criminal eluding capture. MPA Sania Baloch condemned the raid and said that she would raise the issue in the assembly. Early on police and local authorities made progress, however stiff resistance caused high casualties on all sides, resulting in a 48-hour suspension on 4 May 2012. The Inspector General (IG) of Sindh police Mushtaq Shah addressed a press conference at Central Police Office in Karachi stating that the Lyari operation was in its final stages and that the Taliban along with other criminals were involved in Lyari clashes. However, there was no way to corroborate this information. The operations of 2012 were abruptly halted when Nawaz Sharif intervened, to cash in on the conflict between the rivals and win the votes of people of Lyari. Pakistan Muslim League-Nawaz's Sindh leader Raja Saeed met with Uzair Baloch, and also expressed solidarity with the people of Lyari. The 2012 operations were a predominantly a police led operation but only succeeded in arresting a minority of gangsters.

== Karachi Operation 2013–2017 ==
In 2013, operations were conducted under the new Federal Government of Pakistan Muslim League (N) after Prime Minister Nawaz Sharif visited Karachi and devised a strategy to curb violence. With the provincial government of PPP on board, the prime minister gave a go-ahead to Pakistan Rangers to conduct raids and arrest criminals. The Pakistan Rangers was given task to clean the city from any form of violence originating due to the activities of the criminal gangs, armed wings of political parties such as MQM, PPP, and ANP and Islamist extremist groups. By the time Rangers commenced its operation, Karachi became the world's sixth most dangerous city in the world. The Rangers initially faced problems in the Urban Warfare. Rangers stated raised a specialized wings known as the Rangers Anti-Terrorism Wing (RAT wings). The targeted operation began on 7 September 2013, and since thousands of criminals and terrorists have been killed or arrested. The Operation targeted target killers (contract killers), extortionists, PPP-supported terrorists Lyari gangs, MQM-supported hitmen/assassins mainly operating from Nine Zero and the Islamist groups such as Tehreek Taliban Pakistan, Lashkar-e-Jhangvi, and ISIS-K. Under the Karachi Operation, Rangers killed criminals like Baba Ladla, Faisal Pathan, and Matiullah Mehsud. The Rangers also arrested criminals like Saulat Mirza, Uzair Baloch, and Shakeel Commando. The Interior Minister Chaudhry Nisar Ali Khan recently declared the first phase of the operation a success.

The Lyari gangs was specifically targeted under Lyari Operation which was sub-operation of the larger Karachi Operation. The Lyari which was no-go area, mostly returned to Normalcy by 2017. The gangs were dismantled and gangsters were either killed or arrested. Uzair Baloch was also arrested in 2016 by the Pakistan Rangers.

In 2014, the city was ranked the 6th most dangerous city in the world. After success of the operation, crime fell drastically in Karachi, and the city was ranked 93rd most dangerous in mid-2020.

== Death of Baba Ladla ==
Notorious Lyari gang leader, Noor Muhammad alias Baba Ladla was killed in Lyari during a shootout with the Pakistani Rangers in 2017.

== See also ==
- MQM militancy
- MQM insurrection (1994–2016)
- Insurgency in Sindh
- Operation Clean-up
- Pucca Qila Massacre

== In popular culture ==
The sub-plot of Indian spy action thriller duology Dhurandhar and Dhurandhar: The Revenge is loosely based around Operation Lyari in which many people in real-life characters such as Rehman Dakait (played by Akshaye Khanna), SP Chaudhary Aslam Khan (played by Sanjay Dutt), Uzair Baloch (played by Danish Pandor), Baba Ladla (played by Saurav Khurana) and Arshad Pappu (played by Ashwin Dhar) appear.
