= List of longest films in India =

Indian Cinema Longest Films

This list of longest Indian films is composed of films with a running time of 200 minutes (3 hours, 20 min) or more.

== List ==
| Title | Running time | Language | Year | Ref(s) |
|---|---|---|---|---|
| CzechMate: In Search of Jiří Menzel | 448 mins (7 hr, 28 min) | Czech, English, Slovak | 2018 | |
| Tamas | 298 mins (4 hr, 58 min) | Hindi | 1988 | |
| Thavamai Thavamirundhu | Original cut: 275 mins (4 hr, 35 min); Theatrical cut: 204 mins (3 hr, 24 min) | Tamil | 2005 | |
| LOC: Kargil | 255 mins (4 hr, 15 min) | Hindi | 2003 | |
| Mera Naam Joker | 248 mins (4 hr, 8 min) | Hindi | 1970 | |
| Sangam | 238 mins (3 hr, 58 min) | Hindi | 1964 | |
| Lagaan | 233 mins (3 hr, 53 min) | Hindi | 2001 | |
| Dhurandhar: The Revenge | Theatrical Version:229 mins (3 hr, 49 min); OTT Version:232 mins (3 hr ,52 min) | Hindi | 2026 | |
| Daana Veera Soora Karna | 226 mins (3 hr, 46 min) | Telugu | 1977 | |
| Baahubali: The Epic | 225 mins (3 hr, 45 min) | Telugu | 2025 | |
| Pushpa 2: The Rule | Theatrical cut: 200 mins (3 hr, 20 min); Alternate version: 224 mins (3hr 44 mins) | Telugu | 2024 | |
| Khatarnaak | 223 mins (3 hr, 43 min) | Hindi | 1990 | |
| Nadodi Mannan | 220 mins (3 hr, 40 min) | Tamil | 1958 | |
| Parthiban Kanavu | 219 mins (3 hr, 39 min) | Tamil | 1960 | |
| Aaryamala | 218 mins (3 hr, 38 min) | Tamil | 1941 | |
| Mohabbatein | 216 mins (3 hr, 36 min) | Hindi | 2000 | |
| Aayiram Thalai Vaangi Apoorva Chinthamani | 214 mins (3 hr, 34 min) | Tamil | 1947 | |
| Dhurandhar | 214 mins (3 hr, 34 min); 205 mins (3 hr, 25 min) (Netflix) | Hindi | 2025 | |
| Jodhaa Akbar | 213 mins (3 hr, 33 min) | Hindi | 2008 | |
| Indrasabha | 211 mins (3 hr, 31 min) | Hindi | 1932 | |
| Thayumanavar | 211 mins (3 hr, 31 min) | Tamil | 1938 | |
| What's Your Raashee? | 211 mins (3 hr, 31 min) | Hindi | 2009 | |
| Hey Ram | Tamil version: 210 mins (3 hr, 30 min); Hindi version: 207 mins (3 hr, 27 min) | Tamil; Hindi | 2000 | |
| Kabhi Khushi Kabhie Gham | 210 mins (3 hr, 30 min) | Hindi | 2001 | |
| Swades | 210 mins (3 hr, 30 min) | Hindi | 2004 | |
| Lava Kusa | 208 mins (3 hr, 28 min) | Telugu | 1963 | |
| Netaji Subhas Chandra Bose: The Forgotten Hero | 208 mins (3 hr, 28 min) | Hindi | 2005 | |
| Suvarna Sundari | 208 mins (3 hr, 28 min) | Telugu | 1957 | |
| Hum Aapke Hain Koun..! | 206 mins (3 hr 26 min) | Hindi | 1994 | |
| The Bengal Files | 204 mins (3 hr, 24 min) | Hindi | 2025 | |
| Sholay | Alternate cut: 204 mins (3 hr, 24 min); Theatrical cut: 198 mins (3 hr, 18 min); Final cut: 209 minutes (3 hr, 29 min) | Hindi | 1975 | |
| Sampoorna Ramayanam | 204 mins (3 hr, 24 min) | Tamil | 1958 | |
| Naan | 203 mins (3 hr, 23 min) | Tamil | 1967 | |
| Lajja | 202 mins (3 hr, 22 min) | Hindi | 2001 | |
| Border 2 | 201 mins (3 h, 21 min) | Hindi | 2026 | |
| Animal | 201 mins (3 hr, 21 min) | Hindi | 2023 | |
| Gun Gun Gane Gane | 201 mins (3 hr 21 min) | Assamese | 2002 | |
| Saudagar | 201 mins (3 hr, 21 min) | Hindi | 1991 | |
| Salaam-e-Ishq | 201 mins (3 hr, 21 min) | Hindi | 2007 | |
| Kerala Varma Pazhassi Raja | 200 mins (3 hr, 20 min) | Malayalam | 2009 | |

== See also ==
- List of longest films
- List of multilingual Indian films
- Pan-Indian film
