= Uzair Baloch =

Pakistani gangster (born 1970 or 1979 from some sources)

- عزیر جان بلوچ
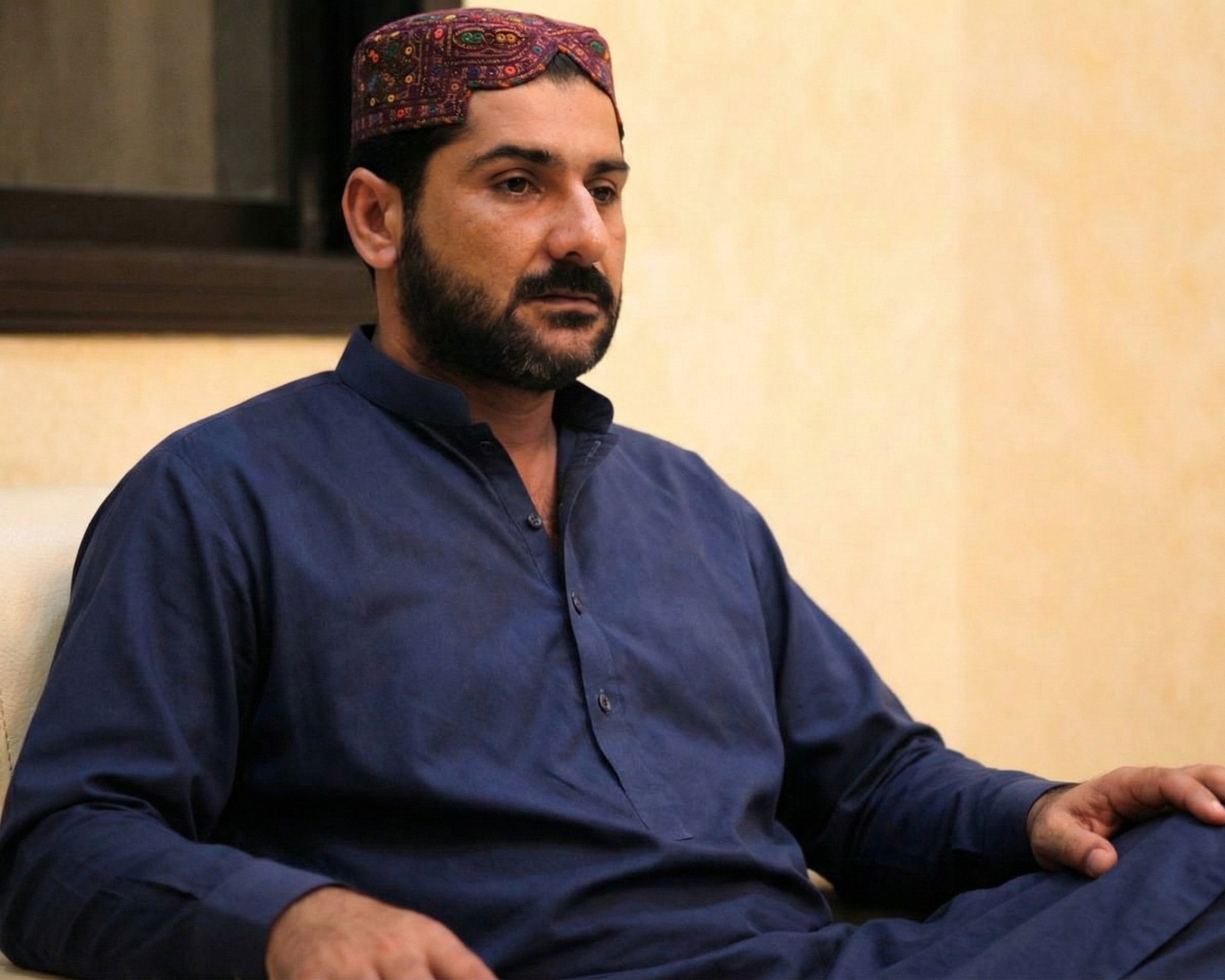
- Uzair Jan Baloch
- Born: 11 January 1970 (age 56); Lyari, Karachi, West Pakistan
- Citizenship: Pakistani; Iranian
- Occupation: Crime lord
- Years active: 2001–2015
- Organization: Peoples' Aman Committee
- Known for: Participating in organised crime in Karachi
- Predecessor: Rehman Dakait
- Opponents: Arshad Papu Gang; MQM-L
- Spouse: Samina Uzair
- Relatives: Rehman Dakait (cousin)
- Status: Incarcerated at Karachi Central Jail
- Criminal charges: Murder; targeted killing; extortion; terrorism; drug trafficking; organized crime; espionage
- Penalty: 12 year’s imprisonment (2020)
- Reward amount: Pakistan: Rs. 2 million (US$7,200)
- Capture status: 1st capture: 2003; 2nd capture: 2009; 3rd capture: 2016
- Wanted since: 2003

Uzair Jan Baloch (Urdu: عزیر جان بلوچ, romanized: 'Uzair Jān Balōc, born 11 January 1970) is a Pakistani gangster and former crime lord. He was also the head of the outlawed Peoples' Aman Committee based in Lyari, Karachi, Sindh, Pakistan.

== Early life ==
Uzair Jan Baloch was born on 11 January 1970 in Lyari, Karachi. His father, Faiz Muhammad (known as Mama Faizu), was a transporter who originated from Iran's Sistan and Baluchestan province. Some members of his family live in Iran and hold dual Iranian-Pakistani citizenship. In 2006, Uzair fled to Iran while escaping an operation against Lyari's street gangs. There, he obtained an Iranian passport and national identity card. In around 2010, his Iranian documents expired and he renewed them.

Baloch started off his career in politics as an independent candidate in the 2001 municipal elections for Lyari's mayorship, but lost to Habib Hassan of the Pakistan People's Party. In 2003, his father was kidnapped for ransom and brutally murdered by Arshad Pappu, son of the Lyari drug lord Haji Laloo. This is said to have marked Uzair's foray into organised crime, as he set out to avenge his father's murder. He initially pursued his father's murder case in courts, but received threats from Lalu's gang. Arshad Pappu happened to be a rival of gangster Rehman Dakait, Uzair's first cousin, with the two involved in a bitter conflict over land and drugs in Lyari. His cousin Rehman invited him to join his gang, and while Uzair initially refused, he later acquiesced as they shared a common enemy. Members of the two gangs started killing each other, with casualties reaching the hundreds. In 2009, Dakait was killed during a shootout with police and Uzair Baloch took over his gang. In 2013, Arshad Pappu and his brother Yasir Arafat were eventually kidnapped by Uzair's gang, tortured and beheaded. Their corpses were paraded before being burnt, and the ashes dumped in a sewer. Uzair Baloch and his associate Baba Ladla reportedly played football with the severed heads. The Friday Times quoted Baloch as having said: "It is karma – what goes around comes around", referring to the avenging of his father's murder.

== Activities and arrests ==
In 2003, Uzair was arrested by a Sindh Police SP Chaudhry Aslam Khan but was later released on bail due to his links with politicians. After the encounter of Rehman Dakait, Uzair became the new gang leader and was involved in many criminal activities. He also became chief of People's Aman Committee. Uzair also had links with Pakistan People's Party and was protected by PPP until 2012. In June 2014, Sindh Government issued his red warrants and head money of Rs 2 million. He was wanted for more than 50 cases of extortions, target killings of policemen and gang members. Uzair left Pakistan after his red warrants were issued. On 29 December 2014, he was arrested by Interpol from Dubai International Airport. He was taken into custody by Interpol and was extradited to Pakistan. He was travelling from Muscat to Dubai. On 30 January 2016, Sindh Rangers took Uzair into custody after obtaining his physical remand from Sindh High Court's administrative judge for the Anti Terrorism Courts. He was in Mithadar, Karachi under the custody of Sindh Rangers. In February 2016, Uzair's wife Samina Baloch filed an application in the Sindh High Court to seek orders for his medical examination and permission for his family members to meet him. In 2021, was sentenced to 12 years imprisonment and sent to the Central Jail Karachi after he was found guilty of working for an international spy agency, following the completion of a military trial against him.

== Total assets ==
According to Pakistani media reports, Uzair Baloch owns a four-story mansion in Lyari with an indoor swimming pool, in addition to a house worth 1.1 million dirhams in Dubai, an office in Dubai International City worth half a million dirhams, a bungalow and plot in Muscat worth 0.9 and 0.6 million dirhams respectively, and a property in Chabahar worth Rs 10 million. The properties are registered under the names of his close relatives or friends. He also has four bank accounts in Dubai holding over 1 million dirhams, and acres of land in Chakiwara and Hub worth several millions of rupees.

== In popular culture ==
In the 2025-26 Indian spy action thriller duology Dhurandhar and Dhurandhar: The Revenge, based on Operation Lyari, he is portrayed by actor Danish Pandor.

The movie brought many old facts and stories about Uzair back in circulation, with people remembering him through their memoirs in different ways.
