= Bloody Brothers =

Indian web series

- Genre: Crime; Thriller; Comedy
- Based on: Guilt by Neil Forsyth
- Written by: Sidharth Hirwe; Anuj Rajoria; Riya Poojary; Navneet Singh Raju
- Directed by: Shaad Ali
- Starring: Jaideep Ahlawat; Mohammed Zeeshan Ayyub; Tina Desai
- Country of origin: India
- Original language: Hindi
- No. of seasons: 1

Production
- Cinematography: Vikash Nowlakha
- Editor: Abhijit Deshpande
- Production companies: Applause Entertainment; BBC Studios

Original release
- Release: 18 March 2022

Bloody Brothers is an Indian dark comedy web-series written by Siddharth Hirwe, Anuj Rajoria, Riya Poojary, Navnit Singh Raju and directed by Shaad Ali. It is a remake of the Scottish television series, Guilt. This web-series is produced by Applause Entertainment Pvt. Ltd starring Jaideep Ahlawat, Mohammed Zeeshan Ayyub, Tina Desai, Shruti Seth, Jitendra Joshi, Maya Alagh, and Satish Kaushik. Bloody Brothers is released on ZEE5 on 18 March 2022.

== Synopsis ==
Two brothers, Jaggi and Daljeet, accidentally kill an old man on a darkened residential street. They manage to conceal their crime, but, when the people around them start to suspect, the brothers’ lives start falling apart. They soon find that they cannot trust anyone. Not even each other.

== Cast ==
- Jaideep Ahlawat as Jagjit "Jaggi" Grover
- Mohammed Zeeshan Ayyub as Daljit Grover
- Tina Desai as Sophie
- Shruti Seth as Priya Grover
- Mugdha Godse as Tanya
- Yuri Suri as Mr Yuri
- Jitendra Joshi as Dushyant
- Maya Alagh as Shiela Aunty
- Satish Kaushik as Handa
- Asrani as Samuel Alvarez

== Reception ==
Saibal Chatterjee from Ndtv gave three star out five stars and said the film was "a thriller that shuns the usual trappings of the genre. No blowouts, no gunfights, no chases, no heavy-handed confrontations - it thrives on sustained restraint."

Archika Khurana from Times of India said "Jaideep Ahlawat & Zeeshan Ayyub's nuanced chemistry powers this dark comedy." Shefali Deshpande of Quint said "This Dark Comedy Is the Perfect Weekend Binge". Nikita Thakkar from Bollywoodlife gave three out of five stars and wrote "Jaideep Ahlawat and Mohammed Zeeshan Ayyub shine in this complicated thriller." Iraa Paul from DNA gave three stars out of five stars stating Mohd Zeeshan Ayyub, Jaideep Ahlawat starrer is intriguing but slow-paced." Nandini Ramnath from Scroll wrote "Jaideep Ahlawat and Zeeshan Ayyub sparkle in black comedy."

== Episodes ==
No. Overall	No. in Season	Title	Directed by	Written by	Release date
1	1	Jaggi	Shaad Ali		18 March 2022
Jaggi and Daljeet hit an old man with their car while returning home from a wedding. Daljeet meets Samuel's niece Sophie, and they are drawn to each other. Sophie becomes suspicious about her uncle's death.
2	2	Daljeet	Shaad Ali		18 March 2022
Jaggi gets Dushyant, a private detective, to handle the case. Dushyant confides in Sophie about his suspicions, and Jaggi and Daljeet get worried. Sheila, Samuel's neighbour, reveals a shocking truth to Jaggi.
3	3	Priya	Shaad Ali		18 March 2022
Sheila demands a huge sum of money from Jaggi to hide his secret. Jaggi receives a package from Sheila. Priya meets Tanya as she is irritated with Jaggi. Sophie confronts Sheila about her lies.
4	4	Sophie	Shaad Ali		18 March 2022
Daljeet confronts Sophie about the picture. Jaggi tries to explain to Daljeet not to get involved in legal matters. Daljeet and Sophie find a letter in one of the books addressed to Sophie.
5	5	Shiela	Shaad Ali		18 March 2022
Sophie questions Sheila about the missing money from Samuel's account. Jaggi, Daljeet, and Dushyant team up to counter Handa and strike a deal with the government official who helps Handa with black money.
6	6	Handa	Shaad Ali		18 March 2022
Sheila tells Sophie the truth about Jaggi and Daljeet. Handa burns Daljeet's bookstore and overtakes Jaggi's legal firm. Sophie reveals the truth to Daljeet about her identity. Jaggi strikes a deal with Sheila.
