= Nayaabad =

Residential neighborhood locality in Karachi, Pakistan

Coordinates: 24°52′N 67°00′E

Nawabad نو آباد
- Neighbourhood
- Interactive map of Nawabad نو آباد
- District: Karachi South
- City: Karachi
- Country: Pakistan
- Time zone: UTC+5 (PST)
- Postal code: 75300

Nayaabad or Nawabad or Naya Abad (Urdu: نو آباد) is a neighbourhood in Lyari, located in the Karachi South district of Karachi, Pakistan.

There are several ethnic groups in Nawabad including Muhajirs, Sindhis, Punjabis, Kashmiris, Seraikis, Pakhtuns, Balochis, Memons, Bohras and Ismailis. Over 99% of the population is Muslim. The population of Lyari Town is estimated to be over 600,000 in 2005.
