= Rehman Dakait =

Pakistani gangster (1975–2009)

Rehman Baloch
- Born: Sardar Abdul Rehman Baloch; 1975; Lyari, Karachi, Pakistan
- Died: 9 August 2009 (aged 33–34); Steel Town, Karachi, Pakistan
- Cause of death: Police encounter
- Other names: Rehman Dakait; Khan Bhai; Khan Saheb; Sardar Baloch
- Organization: Peoples' Aman Committee
- Known for: Involvement in Lyari gang war; Founding Peoples' Aman Committee
- Successor: Uzair Baloch
- Political party: Pakistan Peoples Party
- Opponent: Arshad Pappu
- Relatives: Uzair Baloch (cousin)
- Reward amount: PKR 5 million

Sardar Abdul Rehman Baloch (Urdu: عبدالرحمن بلوچ, 1975 – 9 August 2009), known by the alias Rehman Dakait (Urdu: رحمان ڈکیت), was a Pakistani gangster based in Karachi's Lyari neighbourhood who formed the Peoples' Aman Committee which was affiliated with the Pakistan People's Party. The Government of Sindh had set a reward of Rs. 5 million on his head. Rehman was accused of being involved in more than one hundred crimes. He was wanted for several serious crimes including dacoity, murder and attempted murder, drug trafficking, kidnapping for ransom, and illegal arms trafficking.

== Early life and background ==
Rehman was born in 1975 in Lyari, Karachi in the Pakistani province of Sindh to Iranian Balochi Haji Abu Da'ad Muhammad known by the alias 'Dadal' and his third wife Khadija Bibi. Iqbal "Babu" Dakait later claimed to be Rehman's biological father.

Lyari is one of the most populous, oldest and least developed localities of Karachi with the majority of the population being of Baloch origin (others include Kutchi Gujaratis, Sindhis, and Urdu-speaking Muhajirs). Lyari became home to crime shortly after Pakistan's independence in 1947.

Dadal and his brother, Sher Muhammad a.k.a. Sheru, were petty criminals involved in drug smuggling since 1964. They came up against Kala Nag who dominated the Lyari drug trade and underworld. Kala Nag was killed in the 1970s during a police chase (he jumped from a building while running from the police). Dadal and Sheru now resumed their drug peddling without major competition and eventually died natural deaths.

== Criminal activities ==
=== Gang wars ===
Haji Lal Mohammad a.k.a. Haji Laloo and Iqbal "Babu" Dakait eventually came to control the Lyari underworld in different areas of the locality (often threatening local residents for loyalty). Allah Baksh a.k.a. Kala Nag II, the son of Kala Nag, joined the Babu Dakait Gang and the two worked together against Laloo. Kala Nag II was arrested in 1991 and remains imprisoned.

Illegal arms entered Lyari and Karachi amid the Afghan jihad in the 1980s, and petty drug peddlers, now armed, started extortion as another means of income with the gang wars heating up. Rehman joined the Laloo Gang during this time. He had started peddling drugs from a young age and is said to have had a man stabbed when he was just 13.

Haji Laloo and Babu Dakait started making hits on each other. While Babu Dakait hired Hanif Bajola, a contract killer to kill Laloo, the latter trained Rehman to kill Babu.

According to the Sindh Police, Rehman killed his mother on 18 September 1995 with local news reporting that this was his first murder. Rumours say that he murdered his mother in a fit of rage; when he went to make a hit on Babu Dakait, the latter told Rehman that he had an affair with his mother and was his real father.

Babu Dakait eventually lost four of his sons in the ensuing gangwar. In 1996, he suffered a paralytic stroke and was arrested. In the same year, Rehman Dakait and Yasser Arafat (Haji Laloo's son) were also arrested. Arshad Pappu, another son of Laloo, was also a member of the Laloo Gang but kept a low profile.

=== Drug trade and other crimes ===
In 1997, Rehman escaped police custody while being taken to a court hearing. After the escape, the Laloo Gang expanded its criminal activities from drugs to extortion, contract killing and kidnapping. The Laloo Gang splintered when members started double-crossing each other in illegal deals. Haji Laloo cut Rehman out from the kidnapping ransom of Saleem Memon from Kharadar. In another instance, Faiz Mohammad a.k.a. Faizoo, a transporter and friend of Rehman, was killed by Laloo's son Arshad Pappu after he refused to pay him extortion money.

After Haji Laloo's arrest in 2001, the Laloo Gang splintered into the Rehman Dakait's Baloch Gang and Arshad Pappu' Pathan gang.

After the split, Rehman rapidly expanded his influence outside Lyari towards Malir and Korangi and he was competing with other underworld gangs in the city (including those associated with the MQM).

Rehman was reportedly involved in over 80 criminal cases, many of which he had been bailed out of by his mentor Haji Laloo.

== Politics ==
Around 2008, Rehman started introducing himself as Sardar Abdul Rehman Baloch and became a political figure in Lyari. He established and was the supervisor of the Peoples Aman Committee of Lyari, ostensibly to control the decades-old gangwar and to ensure "peacekeeping." Though it was also involved in criminal activities including securing territorial control for Rehman's gang, extortion etc.

He associated himself with the then ruling Pakistan People's Party (PPP). His growing power in Lyari made him influential in local Karachi politics, business circles and the PPP political structure in Karachi. The Aman Committee enjoyed political patronage of the PPP, although the party's leadership officially denied any connection.

After his death, the leadership of the Aman Committee and Baloch gang was led by his cousin Uzair Baloch.

== Arrest and death ==
With the Sindh Police unable to end the gangwars and crime in Lyari, a designated "Industrial Crime Unit" was established in 2004 but failed to achieve its objectives and was disbanded in November 2005. It was replaced by the "Lyari Task Force".

Rehman was arrested in November, 2008 in Jinnah Town, Quetta and his arrest was followed by protests outside the Karachi Press Club. He later escaped from police custody.

On 9 August 2009, Rehman and his companions Aqeel Baloch, Aurangzaib Baba and Nazir Bala were again intercepted by SP Chaudhry Aslam Khan and his police party. A shootout ensued late in the night in which Rehman and his accomplices were grievously injured. They died en route to the hospital. His death was alleged to be a fake police encounter (extrajudicial killing). Pakistani politician Zulfiqar Mirza has said that he was responsible for getting Rehman killed and regretted his action. Aslam was known for being the only surviving police officer from the anti-crime "Operation Cleanup" of the 1990s, against the Muhajir Qaumi Movement, with other police officers who had participated in this operation being killed in subsequent target killings by MQM-affiliated militants.

== Legacy ==
After Rehman's death, the situation in Lyari became tense. Thousands of people attended his funeral in Lyari, where he is viewed as a Robin Hood-like figure rather than as a criminal (known for distributing the wealth earned from his criminal activities among the poor of Lyari).

Under Rehman's cousin Uzair Baloch, the People's Aman Committee was strengthened even further in both political and criminal spheres before his eventual arrest in 2015.

In March 2024, one of Rehman's sons, Sarban Baloch, along with his accomplice Maqsood, were shot dead in south Karachi in the old city near Nabi Bux police station. The police said that Sarban was wanted in several criminal cases, including cases of murder, drug trade, kidnapping for ransom and extortion. Sarban was from Rehman's second wife who had three more sons from Rehman. She had married a local construction worker after Rehman's death.

On 2 February 2026, Jibran Baloch, another one of Rehman's sons, was arrested in the Kalakot area of Karachi by policemen from the Kalakot Police Station. Police confiscated two pistols along with multiple rounds of ammunition from him during the arrest. He was described by the police as a habitual and professional criminal with a history of arrests in multiple cases.

== Personal life ==
Like his father Dadal, Rehman also married three times. The number of Rehman's children is said to be around seventeen.

== In popular culture ==
Rehman has been depicted in the 2025 Indian spy action thriller duology Dhurandhar (where he has a central character) and Dhurandhar: The Revenge, based on Operation Lyari (where he has a cameo appearance in the latter). His character was portrayed by Akshaye Khanna.

The portrayal of the character of Rahman Dakait in Dhurandhar has evoked all kinds of emotions and reactions in different quarters, with people echoing different perspectives on his actual character and personality.

== See also ==
- Umar Farooq Zahoor
