= Nadeem Commando =

Militant organization in Pakistan

- ندیم کمانڈو
- Leader: Farooq Dada
- Dates active: 1990–1996
- Dissolved: 1996
- Country: Pakistan
- Allegiance: Muttahida Qaumi Movement – London
- Headquarters: Nine Zero, Karachi, Sindh, Pakistan
- Active regions: Karachi and Hyderabad
- Ideology: Muhajir nationalism
- Wars: MQM militancy; Operation Clean-up/Operation Blue Fox

The Nadeem Commando was a small militant Muhajir organization in Pakistan. The origin of the group is unknown, but it is thought to have been active from at least the early 1990s until 1996, when the Pakistani government declared that the majority of the group had been arrested or killed during both 'Operation Clean Up' (1992-1994) and the later anti-crime operation in Karachi (1994-1996) under the second Benazir Bhutto government. Farooq Dada was presumed its leader until 1995, when he was shot to death by police near Jinnah International Airport. His assumed replacement was also shot and killed by police in 1995. It is believed to have been involved and affiliated with the MQM-Altaf/MQM-London, formally known as the Mohajir Qaumi Movement (MQM). The Institute for Conflict Management considered Nadeem Commando a terrorist group.

== Killing of leader ==
On 2 August 1995, Farooq Patni, alias Farooq Dada, and three other MQM militants, Javed Michael/Mikael, Ghaffar Mada and Hanif Turk, were shot dead by police in an armed encounter near the airport when they failed to stop and opened fire on the police.

Farooq Dada was the leader of MQM's Nadeem Commando and was considered to be Pakistan's most wanted man and had a 1.5 million rupee (500k US dollar) price on his head and was wanted for over 140 cases and the murder of over two dozen police officers. Dada was allegedly involved in many killings, extortions and kidnappings.

Armed police officers were waiting for him near the airport after being told that he was moving weapons from the Karachi's Malir district. The Sindh Police claimed that Farooq Dada and three others were on their way to Jinnah International Airport to blow up a PIA plane when police, moved in after being tipped off on their whereabouts. Dada and his three accomplices opened fire on the police as they attempted to do stop and pin down his car. A gun battled ensued in which 10 heavily armed officers fired back back. When officers examined the wreckage of his car they found a weapons cache which included machine guns, AKMs, 4 thousand rounds of ammunition and even an RPG-7.

Despite this, their family members claimed that the men had earlier been arrested from their homes. Another MQM worker, Mohammad Altaf, arrested later on the same day was reportedly identified by Farooq Dada and his three companions when they were brought to Altaf's house by police to help identify him. Witnesses were reported to have seen the four MQM workers at the time of Altaf's arrest; they were, at that time, reportedly held in shackles.
