= Danish Pandor =

Indian actor and model

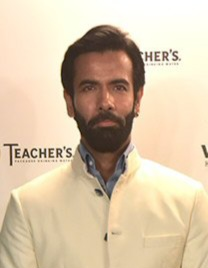
- Pandor in 2026
- Born: 22 December 1987 (age 38); Mumbai, Maharashtra, India
- Occupations: Actor; Model
- Years active: 2007–present
- Height: 1.88 m (6 ft 2 in)

Danish Pandor (born 22 December 1987) is an Indian actor and model who works in Hindi films and television. He is best known for his breakout role as Pakistani gangster Uzair Baloch in the spy action thriller duology Dhurandhar and Dhurandhar: The Revenge.

== Early life and education ==
Born in Mumbai, Maharashtra, India he completed a four-month acting course at the Kishore Namit Kapoor Acting Institute in Mumbai, whilst balancing his college studies. He trained under Withur Chaturvedi, Rupesh Thapliyal, and Samar Jai Singh, focusing on character improvisation and imagination. He holds a master's degree in Business and Finance from the University of Mumbai.

== Career ==
=== Modeling ===
Pandor began his career as a model at the age of 20 in 2007 when he contested in the Gladrags Manhunt contest and placed within the top five. Pandor returned to modeling in 2026, walking the runway for designer Satya Paul at a menswear showcase at London's Lancaster House, which marked the brand's debut international presentation of its menswear line.

=== Acting ===
Pandor made his television debut in 2010 in the second season of the soap opera Kitani Mohabbat Hai, playing the jealous elder brother of the protagonist. Four years later, he made his film debut as a sexual abuser in the thriller W (2014) which centres on the vengeance led by three women against their rapists. He later appeared in a supporting role in the crime series Agent Raghav – Crime Branch, and had a small stint in the long-running family drama Ishqbaaaz. Between 2018 and 2019, he played Bada Badariya in the Netflix crime series Sacred Games. In the following years, Pandor worked across multiple streaming platforms. He performed as a character actor in the football drama web series Bombers on ZEE5, and thriller Matsya Kaand on MX Player. Pandor had a brief part in the poorly received comedy film Double XL (2022) which explores body positivity. He had a major role in the Amazon Prime docuseries Dancing On The Grave. He portrayed an unfaithful husband in SonyLIV series 36 Days, and played the lead heroine's boyfriend in the Vikram Bhatt produced horror film 1920: Horrors of the Heart (2023).

The year 2025 marked a turning point in Pandor's career as he appeared in two mainstream Hindi films that achieved major success. He played Ikhlas Khan in the historical action film Chhaava and gangster Uzair Baloch in the spy action-thriller ensemble Dhurandhar. Both outings became one of highest grossing Indian films of all time and Pandor's performance in the latter earned him acclaim. Despite a supporting antagonist role, his screen time was extensive. Four months later, he reprised his role for its sequel, Dhurandhar: The Revenge (2026), which emerged as an even greater commercial success. A graphic scene in the film depicting his character playing football with a severed head made him a subject of memes. In June of the same year, he featured as Afzal, the leader of a radical faction during the Partition of India, in Imtiaz Ali's critically acclaimed film Main Vaapas Aunga.

He will next play a supporting role of a cricketer in Ashutosh Gowariker's Lalkaara, starring Aamir Khan.

== Personal life ==
Pandor is a practising Muslim.

He is reportedly in a relationship with actress Aahana Kumra.

== In the media ==
In April 2026, Pandor starred in an advertising campaign for Beardo's Godfather fragrance.

== Filmography ==
Key
| † | Denotes films that have not yet been released |

=== Film ===
| Year | Title | Role | Notes |
|---|---|---|---|
| 2014 | W | Dhruv | |
| 2022 | Double XL | Viren | |
| 2023 | 1920: Horrors of the Heart | Arjun | |
| 2025 | Chhaava | Ikhlaas Khan | |
| 2025 | Dhurandhar | Uzair Baloch | |
| 2026 | Dhurandhar: The Revenge | Uzair Baloch | |
| 2026 | Main Vaapas Aaunga | Afzal | |

=== Television ===
| Year(s) | Title | Role | Notes |
|---|---|---|---|
| 2011 | Kitni Mohabbat Hai | Mikhail Singhania | |
| 2015-2016 | Agent Raghav – Crime Branch | Rajbir | |
| 2017 | Ishqbaaaz | Vikram Aditya Thapar | |

=== Web series ===
| Year | Title | Role | Notes |
|---|---|---|---|
| 2018 | Sacred Games | Bada Badariya | |
| 2019-2020 | Bombers | Arjun | |
| 2021 | Matsya Kaand | Anil Ajmera | |
| 2023 | Dancing on the Grave | Akbar Khaleeli | |
| 2024 | 36 Days | Mohit | |
