= Aslam Khan (police officer) =

Pakistani police officer (1963–2014)

Chaudhry Aslam Khan
- Born: Mohammed Aslam; 10 April 1963; Arghushal, Dhodial, KPK, Pakistan
- Died: 9 January 2014 (aged 50); Essa Nagri, Karachi, Sindh, Pakistan
- Cause of death: Assassination by the Pakistani Taliban
- Resting place: Gizri graveyard
- Police career
- Country: Pakistan
- Department: Sindh police
- Branch: CID; Lyari Task Force
- Service years: 1984-2014
- Rank: Senior Superintendent of Police

Aslam Khan (10 April 1963 – 9 January 2014), better known as Chaudhary Aslam, was a Pakistani police officer in the Sindh Police. On 9 January 2014, he was killed in a suicide car bombing carried out by the internationally designated terrorist group Tehrik-e-Taliban Pakistan (TTP).

== Early life ==
Aslam was born in 1963 to Advocate Akram Khan in the Arghushal village of Dhodial, a union council in Mansehra District of Khyber Pakhtunkhwa. He belonged to the Arghushal clan of the Swati tribe of Pashtuns. He moved to Karachi with his father after completing his primary education.

== Police career ==
Aslam joined the Sindh Police on 31 October 1984 as an Assistant Sub-Inspector (ASI) in Karachi and served in several police stations across Karachi and in Balochistan due to provincial allocation. Chaudhry Aslam rose through the ranks, first becoming an Inspector and then a Station House Officer (SHO) of Gulbahar police station in 1987. On 25 February 1999, he was appointed the Deputy Superintendent of Police (DSP) of Nazimabad. In the 2000s, he was variously posted at Special Branch Larkana, SRP Sukkur and the anti-Car Lifting Cell Karachi. He was promoted as a Superintendent of Police (SP) in 2005.

In 2010, Aslam was appointed as SP, in-charge of the Anti-Extremism Crime Wing/Investigation Wing of Criminal Investigation Department.

From 2005 to 2013, Aslam arrested and killed gang war criminals, target killers, extortionists and militants belonging to the Muttahida Qaumi Movement (MQM), Tehrik-i-Taliban Pakistan (TTP), Balochistan Liberation Army (BLA), Lashkar-e-Jhangvi (LeJ) and Sipah-e-Sahaba Pakistan (SSP).

=== Karachi underworld ===
Aslam worked as an encounter specialist (a euphemism for extrajudicial killings) from 1992 to 1994 and 1996 to 1997. He was suspended then came back to service in 2004 and received the task of eradicating target killers. Later he was ordered to lead the Lyari Task Force (LTF) and end the gang war in Lyari Town.

During the 2000s, most of the officers associated with the earlier 1990s Operation Clean-up in Karachi were killed and his career was severely damaged due to controversies during this time.

In 2006, as the head of the Lyari Task Force, he was arrested for the murder of gangster Mushtaq Brohi. After being in jail for sixteen months, the Sindh High Court released Aslam and his associates on bail in December 2007. In 2009, allegations of murder surfaced once again that SP Investigation, Chaudhry Aslam, and his associates had killed gangster Rehman Dakait in what has been alleged to be a fake police encounter. In response Aslam told an interviewer "I have never staged fake encounters in my career" a few weeks later that month when the allegations began to surface. "I have no idea why people in Lyari call me ‘encounter specialist’ even though most of the criminals I have arrested are alive and in prison" Aslam said.

Aslam won himself a reputation for his performance in the 2012 Operation Lyari which once again aimed at clearing the area of criminals.

=== 2011 attack by Taliban ===
On the morning of 19 September 2011, Aslam escaped unhurt from a Pakistani Taliban attack in the Defence Housing Authority, Karachi. The attacker had rammed an explosives-laden car into the outside of his house - which resulted in the death of eight people, including his own guards, and cook. TTP claimed responsibility for the attack as retaliation for ongoing efforts against them, including the arrest and killing of many of its members. At that time Aslam, whose home was half blown away by the blast, defiantly said he knew he was the target but it would not deter him from fighting against extremists and that he would bury them in the same ground.

== Assassination ==
On 9 January 2014, Aslam died, along with two other officers, his guard and driver, when an explosives laden car smashed into Aslam's convoy on the Lyari Expressway in the Essa Nagri area of Karachi. Aslam had previously survived nine such attempts. The Mohmand Agency chapter of the banned Tehrik-i-Taliban Pakistan (TTP) claimed responsibility for the attack. Sajjad Mohmand, a spokesman for the militant group, said Aslam was targeted for carrying out operations against the TTP. "Aslam was involved in killing Taliban prisoners in CID cells in Karachi and was on the top of our hit-list," he said. Investigators in Karachi who were probing the death of Aslam revealed that his own driver who was also one of his bodyguards was involved in the murder. The investigation team stated that the bodyguard-driver informed the terrorists of Aslam's motorcades movement.

Pakistan accused Kulbhushan Jadhav, an Indian national arrested in 2017 in Balochistan on allegations of spying and terrorism, of being involved in Aslam's assassination. In 2017, a video was released by the Inter-Services Public Relations (the media wing of the Pakistan Armed Forces) where Jadhav can be seen confessing that the assassination of Aslam was sponsored by the Indian intelligence agency Research & Analysis Wing on the directions of its chief Anil Dhasmana. The validity of the video has been criticized by the Indian side, claiming it to be doctored and forced upon Jadhav following torture to serve the interests of the Pakistani government.

=== Reactions to his death ===
Prime Minister of Pakistan Nawaz Sharif praised Chaudhry Aslam and the other officers killed as martyrs and said that such attacks will not deter the law enforcement agencies in their fight against terrorism.

The Inter-Services Public Relations (ISPR) issued a statement made by Chief of the Army Staff General Raheel Sharif, acknowledging the contributions of police and other Law Enforcement Agencies (LEAs) in the fight against terror, and paying tribute to Aslam for laying down his life in the line of duty.

Then Muttahida Qaumi Movement (MQM) chief Altaf Hussain also condemned the killing of Aslam and his two colleagues. "SSP Chaudhry Aslam was active in fighting against terrorists who are carrying out subversive activities in Pakistan. He conducted operations against terrorists and criminal elements bravely", Altaf Hussain said.

People from Aslam's hometown in Dodial and the Mansehra District mourned him shortly after finding out about his death.

"I have no words to say about my brother but I can only say he was a brave child and shining students of his school and spent his entire life as a brave man" said Mohammad Khalid, the only brother of Aslam Khan before leaving Swat for Karachi in order to recite funeral prayers for his now-deceased brother.

Fida Hussain, a childhood friend of Aslam, stated that he had spoken to Aslam on days before his death and had warned him to be careful of his enemies. He added "Would you believe what was his reply? 'The night I’m destined to be in grave will not come [to me] outside'." Hussain also said that Aslam had been known since his childhood in his hometown and school for being a polite and brave person. Hussain described him as an intelligent students who was loyal to his friends and also that Aslam had continued to remain in contact with his friends. Hussain finished by saying "Though he was not frequent visitor to his native village, whenever he came, he visited his friends and recalled past memories with great enthusiasm and joy. I cannot forget his last meeting with me, which is now a great asset for me".

== In popular culture ==
=== Biopic ===
In 2019, it was announced that an action movie based on his life would be released, Chaudhry – The Martyr, directed by Azeem Sajjad. The movie was finally released in 2022. Chaudhry's role was played by his cousin Chaudhry Tariq Islam, who hails from the same village, is a Deputy superintendent of police (DSP) himself, and worked with Khan for over thirty years; the director acknowledged he had cast him because he's "well versed with [Khan's] body language, gestures, attitude and reflexes."

=== Indian cinema ===
He was portrayed by Sanjay Dutt in the Indian-Hindi spy action thriller duology, Dhurandhar (2025) and Dhurandhar: The Revenge (2026). SP Aslam Khan was a fan of Indian matinee idol, Sanjay Dutt.

This led to some controversy. The portrayal of his character has evoked all kinds of emotions and reactions, with people echoing different views on his real character. Prior to the release of the film, his wife Noreen Aslam voiced her concern over his portrayal in the film and even threatened to take legal action, though she did not actually do so.

== See also ==
- Deaths in 2014
- Terrorist incidents in Pakistan in 2014
- Safwat Ghayur
