= Nissim Mannathukkaren =

Indian professor, writer, and scholar

Dr. Nissim Mannathukkaren
- Education: Bangalore University, Jawaharlal Nehru University and Queen's University,

Nissim Mannathukkaren is an associate professor and chair in Dalhousie University's Department of International Development Studies in Halifax, Nova Scotia, Canada. The Rupture with Memory: Derrida and the Specters that Haunt Marxism is his first book (2006).

== Biography ==
=== Early life and education ===
He is from Muvattupuzha, Kerala, India and currently resides in Canada. He completed his B.A degree in Politics, Economics and History from Bangalore University, M.A degree in Political Science and MPhil degrees in Political Science from Jawaharlal Nehru University and PhD degree in Political Studies from Queen's University, Canada. .

== Views ==
=== Caste system ===
Mannathukkaren writes in the final paragraph of his Being the privileged article, "Let us, similarly, in an upper caste-dominated society, acknowledge the vast undeserved space we occupy. Let us cede what has to be ceded.

== Publications ==
=== Books ===
- Rupture with Memory: Derrida and the Specters that Haunt Marxism
- Communism, Subaltern Studies and Postcolonial Theory: The Left in South India

=== Book chapters ===
- Nissim Mannathukkaren. (2018) The ‘people’ and the ‘political’. In Mujibur Rehman. (author) Rise of Saffron Power. 1st Edition, Routledge. Pages 26.
- Nissim Mannathukkaren, 2010, Reading cricket fiction in the times of Hindu nationalism and farmer suicides: Fallacies of textual interpretation, The Politics of Sport in South Asia, Routledge, 26.

=== Articles ===
In India's English-language press, he writes op-eds for The Hindu, The Wire, Indian Express, Telegraph, Outlook, Scroll, Quint, Deccan Chronicle, Newsclick, Citizen, openDemocracy, The Kochi Post, Janata Weekly and so forth.

==== The wire ====
- A Communal Virus and Our Collective Irrationality

==== open Democracy ====
- Modi government and the muzzling of the Indian media

=== Research ===
Mannathukkaren's research interests are primarily in the areas of Left and communist movements, Development and democracy, Modernity, Politics of popular culture and Marxist and postcolonial theories. Citizenship Studies, Journal of Peasant Studies, Third World Quarterly, Economic and Political Weekly, Journal of Critical Realism, International Journal of the History of Sport, Dialectical Anthropology, Inter-Asia Cultural Studies, and Sikh Formations are among the journals that have published his work.

- Communalism sans violence: A Keralan exceptionalism?

=== Book reviews ===
- Vinay Gidwani, Capital, Interrupted: Agrarian Development and the Politics of Work in India, 2009, Journal of Peasant Studies, Vol. 36, No. 2, 2009, 464–466.

== Recognition ==
- 2000, The Commonwealth Scholarship and Fellowship Plan (CSFP) scholarship, for doctoral studies.
- 2010, The Social Sciences and Humanities Research Council of Canada (SSHRC) research award, for his project ‘Unveiling the Janus of Modernity: A Case Study of Kerala”.

== Controversies ==
Nissim Mannathukkaren was one of the 250 writers and cultural activists who demanded the restoration of Article 370 of the Constitution of India, and the restoration of the state of Jammu & Kashmir.

== Bibliography ==
- Mannathukkaren, NISSIM (2021). COMMUNISM, SUBALTERN STUDIES AND POSTCOLONIAL THEORY : the left in south india. S.l: ROUTLEDGE INDIA. ISBN 978-1138056794.
- Mannathukkaren, Nissim (2006). The rupture with memory : Derrida and the specters that haunt Marxism. Pondicherry: Navayana. ISBN 8189059084.

== See also ==
- List of Dalhousie University people
