= Rangers Anti-Terrorism Wing =

Pakistani paramilitary unit

Agency overview
- Formed: 2004

Jurisdictional structure
- Federal agency (Operations jurisdiction): Pakistan
- Operations jurisdiction: Sindh, Pakistan
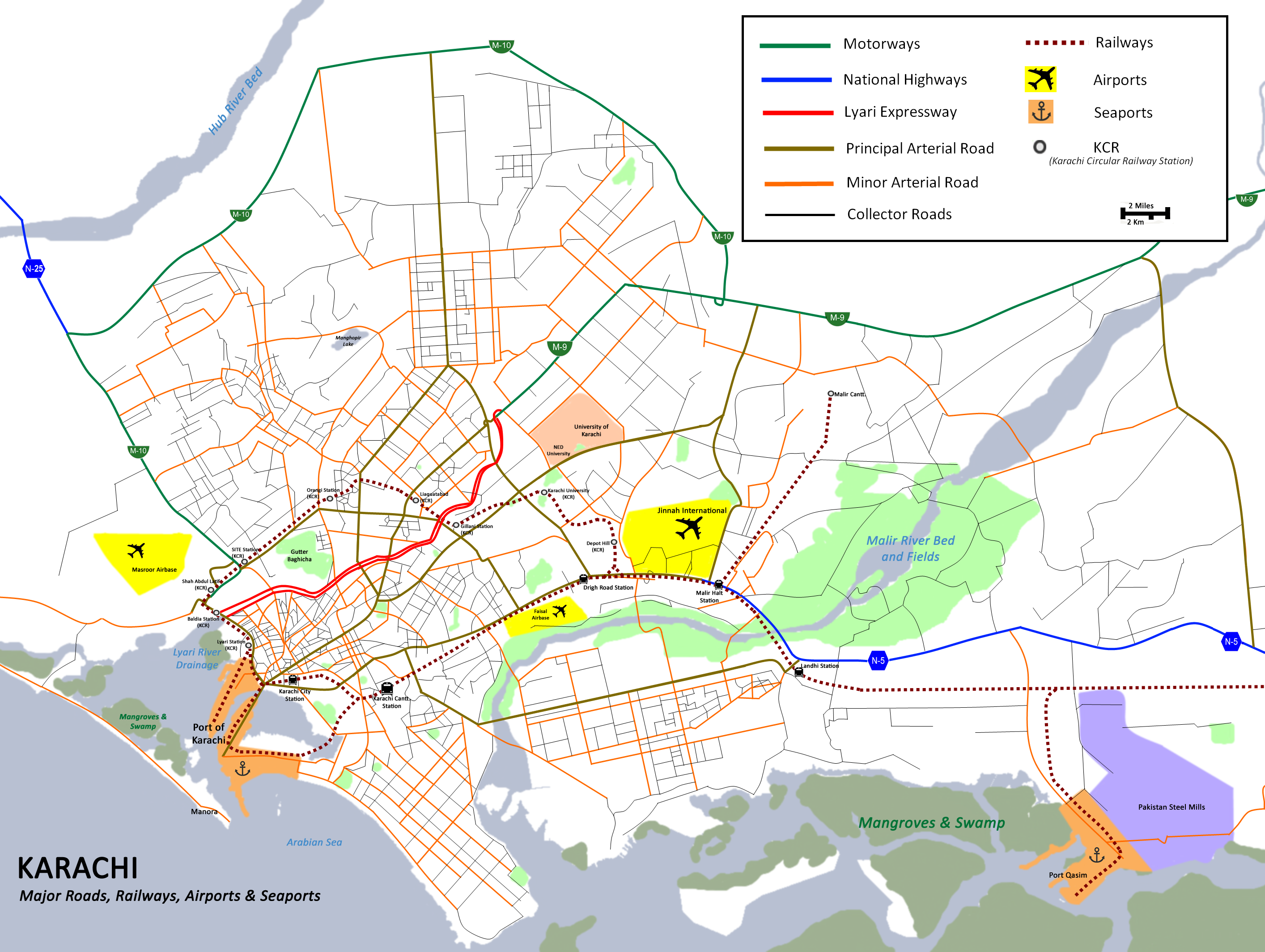
- Map of Rangers Anti-Terrorism Wing's jurisdiction
- Legal jurisdiction: Sindh, Pakistan
- Primary governing body: Government of Pakistan
- Secondary governing body: Government of Sindh
- Constituting instrument: The Anti Terrorism Act 1997
- General nature: Federal law enforcement
- Specialist jurisdiction: Counter terrorism, special weapons operations; protection of internationally protected persons, other very important persons, or state property

Operational structure
- Overseen by: Pakistan Army
- Headquarters: Karachi
- Parent agency: Sindh Rangers

The Rangers Anti-Terrorism Wing is a specialised counter-terrorism unit of the paramilitary Sindh Rangers, operating in the city of Karachi, Pakistan. It was formed in 2004 following increased violence in Karachi. One of the primary tasks of the unit is to carry out operations against suspected terrorists.

== History ==
In March 2013 the wing participated in a large operation of over 1,000 Rangers against potential terrorists in the Manghopir area of Karachi. In October of the same year, the unit took part in a coordinated series of actions with local police in the Lyari area of Karachi, against suspected gangs of criminals. The wing was also involved in a similar raid on Manghopir with around 1,000 Rangers in February 2014. This was followed by another operation in Manghopir of 300 personnel looking for members of illegal organisations. In February 2020 the wing transferred stolen items back to owners, which had been recovered in earlier operations.

== See also ==
- National Counter Terrorism Authority
- Counter Terrorism Department (Pakistan)
