= People's Aman Committee =

پیپلز امن کمیٹی
- Founded: 2008
- Founded by: Rehman Dakait †
- Founding location: Lyari, Karachi, Sindh, Pakistan
- Years active: 2008–2013
- Territory: Southern Pakistan
- Ethnicity: Mostly Balochs & Niazi Pashtuns
- Membership: 1,000+ (peak)
- Leaders: Rehman Dakait †; Uzair Baloch (POW)
- Criminal activities: Drug trafficking, Extortion
- Rivals: Arshad Pappu gang MQM

The People's Aman Committee (Urdu: پیپلز امن کمیٹی) was a Pakistani political party alleged militant group/gang which was tied to the Pakistan People's Party and based in the town of Lyari, in the city of Karachi, in Sindh province. The PAC was founded by the infamous Karachi gangster Rehman Dakait in 2008 and is accused of involvement in organized crime and gang wars. After Rehman's death in 2009, leadership of the group was taken over by his cousin, Uzair Baloch.

The PAC supported the Pakistan People's Party, the ruling party in Pakistan from 2008 until the 2013 elections.

The organization initially only served Lyari, but soon offices were set up in other Baloch-populated neighbourhoods of Karachi, such as Dalmiya (Shantinagar), Malir, Gadap, Old Golimar, Mawach Goth, and even in some nearby towns and villages in Sindh and Balochistan.

The PAC has a bitter rivalry with the Muttahida Qaumi Movement (MQM) in the city of Karachi. In March 2011, the PAC agreed to disband after its parent organization the Pakistan Peoples Party was pressured by its then allies, the MQM. Despite being officially defunct in by 2011, the organization continued to function de facto on the ground until the late 2010s as the Lyari Aman Committee (LAC).

== Prohibition ==
On October 11, 2011, the PAC was banned under Clause (11/B) of Anti-terrorism Act 1997. The Sindh Home Ministry, after issuing its notification also directed the law enforcement agencies to monitor PAC activities. The home ministry notification outlaws establishment of PAC offices and restricts its activities anywhere in the province.

== See also ==
- Operation Lyari
