= NA-241 Karachi South-III =

Constituency of the National Assembly of Pakistan

- Constituency for the National Assembly of Pakistan
- Region: Aram Bagh Town (partly), Saddar Town, Defence, Clifton Cantonment and Karachi Cantonment (partly) of Karachi South in Karachi
- Electorate: 462,512

Current constituency
- Party: PPP
- Member: Mirza Ikhtiar Baig
- Created from: NA-250 Karachi-XII

NA-241 Karachi South-III (این اے-۲۴۱، کراچی جنوب -۳) is a constituency for the National Assembly of Pakistan that encompasses much of South Karachi. The constituency is composed of the South Karachi localities of Aram Bagh, Civil Line, Clifton, Defence, Gizri, Mithadar, Kharadar, Nanak Wara, part of Ranchore Line, Saddar, and Serai Quarter.

== Provincial assembly constituencies ==
Constituency number	Constituency	District	Current MPA	Party
109	PS-109 Karachi South-IV	Karachi South District	Bilal Hussain Khan Jadoon	PTI
110	PS-110 Karachi South-V	Karachi South District	Rehan Bandukda	PTI

== Election 2002 ==
General elections were held In NA-250 Karachi-XII on 10 October 2002.

Abdul Sattar Afghani of Muttahida Majlis-e-Amal won by 24,462 votes followed by Nasreen Jalil of MQM with 19,414 votes

General election 2002: NA-250 Karachi-XII
Party	Candidate	Votes	%	±%
MMA	Abdul Sattar Afghani	21,462	31.43	
MQM-P	Nasreen Jalil	19,414	28.43	
PPP	Dr. Mirza Ikhtiar Baig	12,105	17.73	
PML(N)	Mamnoon Hussain	5,565	8.15	
PML(Q)	M.A. Wajid Jawad	4,718	6.91	
PTI	Syed Kamal Shah	3,176	4.65	
PST	Syed Javed Umer	1,226	1.80	
Others	Others (eight candidates)	617	0.90	
Turnout		69,235	33.71	
Total valid votes		68,283	98.63	
Rejected ballots		952	1.37	
Majority		2,048	3.00	
Registered electors		205,400		

== Election 2008 ==
The result of the 2008 general election in this constituency is given below.

Khushbakhat Shujaat of MQM succeeded in the election 2008 and became the member of National Assembly with 52,045 votes, followed by Dr. Mirza Ikhtiar Baig of PPP, who secured 44,412 votes.

General election 2008: NA-250 Karachi-XII
Party	Candidate	Votes	%	±%
MQM-P	Khush Bakhat Shujaat	52,045	51.16	
PPP	Dr. Mirza Ikhtiar Baig	44,412	43.66	
PML(N)	Saleem Zia	3,480	3.42	
Independent	Haleem Ahmed Siddiqui	1,333	1.31	
Others	Others (eight candidates)	461	0.45	
Turnout		104,176	30.23	
Total valid votes		101,731	97.65	
Rejected ballots		2,445	2.35	
Majority		7,633	7.50	
Registered electors		344,657		
MQM-P gain from MMA				

== Election 2013 ==
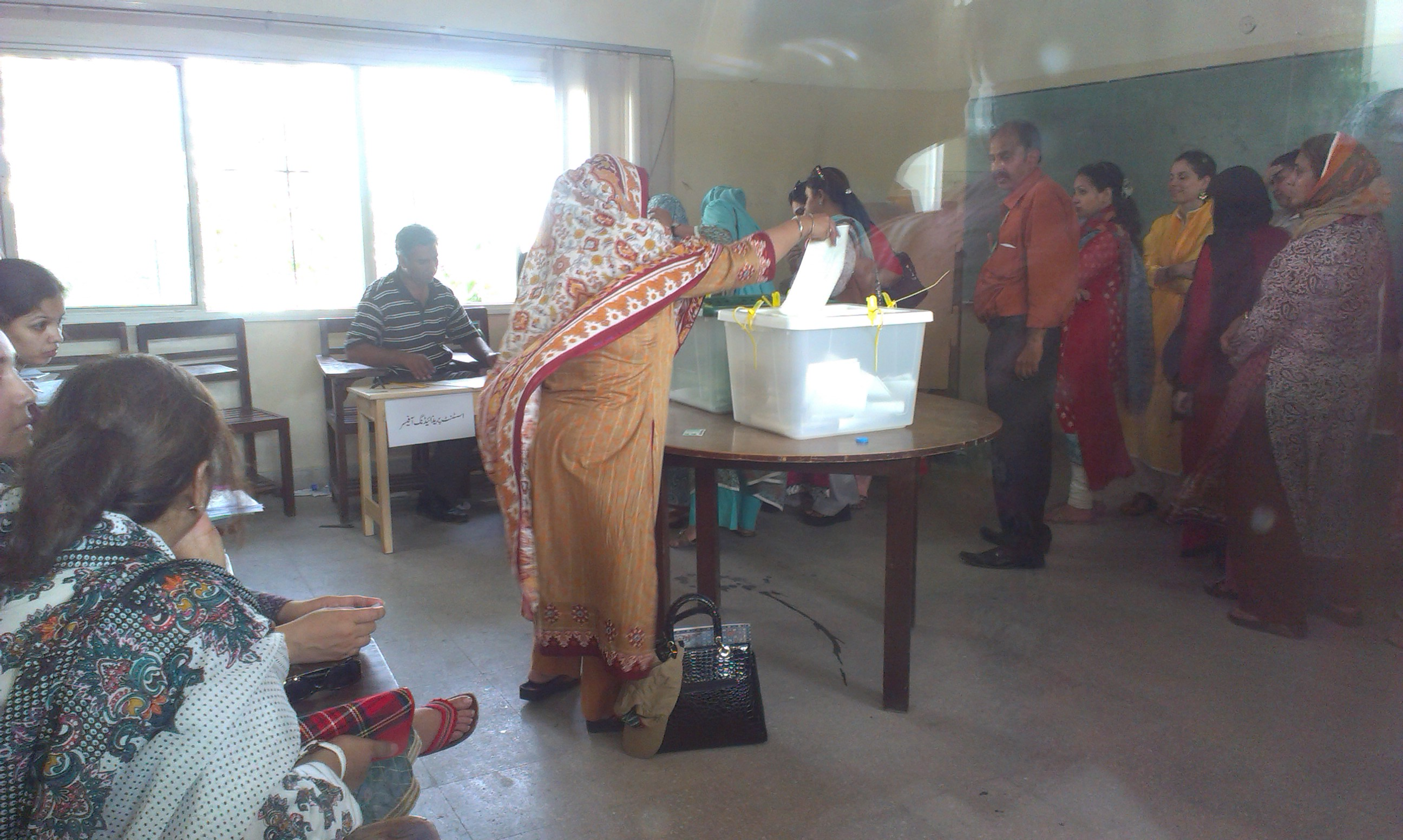
A voter casts their vote in the 2013 general elections

Dr. Arif Alvi of PTI won the 2013 elections with a total of 76,305 votes. The elections were held on 11 May but there were abundant reports of election irregularities which resulted in the Election Commission of Pakistan declaring a re-polling a week later on 19 May 2013 in 42 polling stations out of a total of 186. Alvi was declared the winner with 76,305 votes, followed by Khushbakht Shujaat of MQM at 28,374, and then Naimatullah Khan belonging to JI, who received 11,149 votes. Jamaat-e-Islami boycotted the elections on the afternoon of 11 May (election day), citing massive election rigging in Karachi and Hyderabad.

On 18 May, a day before the re-polling, PTI leader Zahra Shahid Hussain was assassinated outside her house. The entire week, the Muttahida Qaumi Movement (MQM) had been appealing to the Election Commission of Pakistan to hold elections throughout the NA-250 constituency, but their appeal was rejected. Ultimately MQM chose to boycott the re-polling of 42 polling stations in NA-250 on 19 May. Alvi of PTI was declared as a Member of the National Assembly of Pakistan from NA-250 Constituency of Karachi.

Dr. Arif Alvi of Pakistan Tehreek-e-Insaf was declared the winner with 77,659 votes, followed by Khushbakht Shujaat of MQM-L at 30,365, and Naimatullah Khan of Jamaat-e-Islami, who received 11,698 votes.

General election 2013: NA-250 Karachi-XII
Party	Candidate	Votes	%	±%
PTI	Arif Alvi	77,659	60.47	
MQM-P	Khush Bakhat Shujaat	30,365	23.65	
JI	Niamatullah Khan	11,698	9.11	
PPP	Muhammad Rashid Hussain Rabani	4,520	3.52	
Others	Others (twenty eight candidates)	4,176	3.25	
Turnout		129,737	35.49	
Total valid votes		128,418	98.98	
Rejected ballots		1,319	1.02	
Majority		47,294	36.82	
Registered electors		365,531		
PTI gain from MQM-P				

== Election 2018 ==
Previously this constituency was labelled as NA-250, but in the 2018 general elections it was re-labelled by the Election Commission of Pakistan as NA-247 Karachi South-II. The 2018 general elections were held on 25 July 2018. Pakistan Tehreek-e-Insaf's Arif Alvi won the election but later resigned from the National Assembly constituency as he was then elected as the 13th President of Pakistan.

General election 2018: NA-247 Karachi South-II
Party	Candidate	Votes	%	±%
PTI	Arif Alvi	91,020	42.05	
TLP	Syed Zaman Ali Shah Jaffery	24,680	11.40	
MQM-P	Farooq Sattar	24,146	11.16	
MMA	Muhammad Hussain Mehanti	22,780	10.52	
PPP	Abdul Aziz Memon	19,552	9.03	
PML(N)	Afnan Ullah Khan	18,130	8.38	
Others	Others (seventeen candidates)	16,138	7.46	
Turnout		219,037	40.27	
Total valid votes		216,446	98.82	
Rejected ballots		2,591	1.18	
Majority		66,340	30.65	
Registered electors		543,964		
PTI hold		Swing	N/A	

== By-election 2018 ==
On 5 September 2018, Arif Alvi tendered his resignation from the National Assembly as he was elected as the 13th President of Pakistan. The by-election was then held in this constituency on 21 October 2018.

By-election 2018: NA-247 Karachi South-II
Party	Candidate	Votes	%	±%
PTI	Aftab Siddiqui	32,456	51.83	▲9.78
MQM-P	Sadiq Iftikhar	14,026	22.40	▲11.24
PPP	Qaiser Khan Nizamani	13,360	21.34	▲12.31
Others	Others (nine candidates)	2,774	4.43	
Turnout		63,157	11.56	▼28.71
Total valid votes		62,616	99.14	▲0.32
Rejected ballots		541	0.86	▼0.32
Majority		18,430	29.43	▼1.22
Registered electors		546,451		
PTI hold		Swing	N/A	

== Election 2024 ==
General elections was held on 8 February 2024 with one of the lowest voter turnouts in the entire country—estimated at around 23%. Mirza Ikhtiar Baig won the election with 52,456 votes.

General election 2024: NA-241 Karachi South-III
Party	Candidate	Votes	%	±%
PPP	Mirza Ikhtiar Baig	52,456	47.58	▲26.24
PTI	Khurrum Sher Zaman (Note: Filed nomination papers as PTI candidate but ECP allowed him to run as an Independent)	48,610	44.10	▼7.73
JI	Naveed Ali Baig	4,112	3.73	N/A
Others	Others (thirty-four candidates)	5,059	4.59	
Turnout		170,004	23.83	▲12.27
Total valid votes		110,237	100.00	
Rejected ballots		0	0.00	
Majority		3,846	3.49	
Registered electors		462,512		
PPP gain from PTI				

== See also ==
- NA-240 Karachi South-II
- NA-242 Karachi Keamari-I
