= Mohammad Jibran Nasir =

Pakistani civil rights activist and lawyer (born 1987)

- Born: 10 February 1987 (age 39); Karachi, Sindh, Pakistan
- Occupations: Civil rights activist; lawyer
- Spouse: Mansha Pasha (m. 2021)

Mohammad Jibran Nasir (Urdu: محمد جبران ناصر; born 10 February 1987) is a Pakistani lawyer, civil rights activist, and independent politician based in Karachi, Pakistan. He rose to national prominence in December 2014 when he led protests outside Islamabad's Lal Masjid demanding the arrest of cleric Abdul Aziz following the Army Public School massacre in Peshawar. He is founder of NGO Never Forget Pakistan and has contested Pakistani elections in 2013, 2018 and 2024 as an independent candidate from Karachi constituencies.

== Early life and education ==
Nasir was born on 10 February 1987 in Karachi, Pakistan. He completed his O-Levels from Saint Michael's Convent School in Karachi, A-Levels from The Lyceum School in Karachi, and went to the University of London International Programme for Bachelor of Law (LLB Hons.). Later, he completed LLM in International Commercial Law from the University of Northumbria, UK.

== Activism ==
He is a lawyer by profession and is known for criticizing state policies regarding banned organisations in Pakistan and call attention to the need for protection of minorities.

Nasir has been a trustee at Elaj Trust and involved in relief work through Elaj Trust. He founded the NGO, Never Forget Pakistan and is also involved in advocacy for marginalised communities through Pakistan For All.

Nasir became prominent following the December 2014's Peshawar's school attack which led to 150 dead after he led the procession calling for the arrest of Lal Masjid cleric Abdul Aziz, for which he subsequently received alleged threats from Taliban spokesman.

He was noted by Foreign Policy Magazine amongst the three Pakistanis making considerable effort against sectarian violence.

In January 2015, Nasir played a key role in organising a new movement to "Reclaim Pakistan" from violent extremism and played a major role in organising demonstrations carrying playcards and candles. Nasir had been leading protests against terrorism in Pakistan, and was arrested on 5 February 2015 for protesting near the Chief Minister's residence along with other Civil Society activists. Later on the same day, Nasir was released by the Karachi Police. Following his release he addressed protesters gathered and reiterated his 15-day ultimatum to government for taking action against banned organizations.

In 2017, Nasir filed a complaint with Pakistan Electronic Media Regulatory Authority (PEMRA) alleging Aamir Liaquat Hussain in his TV show of running a defamatory and life-threatening campaign against him. Following which PEMRA banned TV show of Aamir Liaquat. Rawalpindi police also registered a case against Aamir Liaquat for threatening the life of Nasir. Amnesty International in a letter to Interior Minister of Pakistan called on the government to take action to protect the lives and rights of activists including of Nasir due to harassment and threats by Aamir Liaquat.

In August 2026, Nasir represented the family of Karachi businessman Mir Raza Ali Khan in proceedings over Ali's death. He challenged changes to the medico-legal board appointed for Ali's exhumation, after which the procedure was postponed and the original board was restored.

== Political career ==
Nasir ran for seat of the National Assembly of Pakistan and Provincial Assembly of Sindh as an independent candidate from Constituency NA-250 (Karachi-XII) and Constituency PS-113 (Karachi-XXV) respectively in 2013 Pakistani general election, but was unsuccessful after securing a meager 259 votes for the NA seat. He lost the National Assembly seat to Pakistan Tehreek-e-Insaf's candidate Arif Alvi and Sindh Assembly seat to Samar Ali Khan. NA-250 was described as one of the most hotly contested seats for the National Assembly. After the 2018 delimitation, the NA-250 constituency was renamed NA-247.

In June 2018, he announced to contest in 2018 Pakistani general election as an independent candidate, for the seat of the National Assembly from Constituency NA-247 and for the seat of the Provincial Assembly of Sindh from Constituency PS-111. His election campaign was titled "Hum Mein Se Aik". Despite numerous publicity campaigns, he lost elections for both the national and provincial assembly seats by substantial margins.

He ran for the seat of the Provincial Assembly of Sindh from Constituency PS-111 as an independent candidate in by-election held on 21 October 2018, but was unsuccessful.

In the 2024 general election, Nasir contested NA-241 (Karachi South) as an independent candidate and secured 1,027 votes, finishing fourth. He also contested the Sindh Assembly seat PS-110 for the fourth time in 2024, running on a platform focused on access, accountability, and justice for the constituency.
