= NA-240 Karachi South-II =

Constituency of the National Assembly of Pakistan

- Constituency for the National Assembly of Pakistan
- Region: Lyari Town (partly), Garden Town and Aram Bagh Town (partly) of Karachi South in Karachi
- Electorate: 385,971

Current constituency
- Created: 2002
- Party: MQM-P
- Member: Arshad Abdullah Vohra

NA-240 Karachi South-II (این اے-240، کراچی جنوبی -2) is a constituency for the National Assembly of Pakistan. It mainly comprised the historic Saddar Town neighborhood of Karachi. After the 2018 delimitations, its areas have been divided among the constituencies of NA-246 (Karachi South-I) and NA-247 (Karachi South-II), with NA-247 getting the larger piece. The Garden Subdivision was equally distributed between the two. After 2023 Delimitations This constituency revived.

== Provincial Assembly segments ==
Constituency number	Constituency	District	Current MPA	Party
107	PS-107 Karachi South-II	Karachi District South	Muhammad Yousuf Baloch	PPP
108	PS-108 Karachi South-III	Karachi District South	Muhammad Dilawar	MQM-P

== Election of 2002 ==
General elections were held on 10 October 2002. Aamir Liaquat Hussain of Muttahida Qaumi Movement won by 30,458 votes.

General election 2002: NA-249 Karachi South-XI
Party	Candidate	Votes	%	±%
MQM	Aamir Liaquat Hussain	30,458	35.55	
MMA	Abdul Majeed Noorani	22,973	26.81	
PPP	Abdul Habib Memon	22,708	26.50	
PST	Muhammad Iftikhar Ahmed Bhatti	7,500	8.75	
Others	Others (eight candidates)	3,578	2.39	
Turnout		86,581	34.55	
Total valid votes		85,681	98.96	
Rejected ballots		900	1.04	
Majority		7,485	8.74	
Registered electors		250,626		

== Election of 2008 ==
General elections were held on 18 February 2008. Farooq Sattar of Muttahida Qaumi Movement won by 103,846 votes.

General election 2008: NA-249 Karachi South-XI
Party	Candidate	Votes	%	±%
MQM	Farooq Sattar	103,846	57.45	
PPP	Abdul Habib Memon	73,324	40.57	
Others	Others (three candidates)	3,578	1.98	
Turnout		182,457	47.01	
Total valid votes		180,748	99.06	
Rejected ballots		1,709	0.94	
Majority		30,522	16.88	
Registered electors		388,099		
MQM hold				

== Election of 2013 ==
General elections were held on 11 May 2013. Farooq Sattar of Muttahida Qaumi Movement – London won by 109,952 votes and became the member of National Assembly.

General election 2013: NA-249 Karachi South-XI
Party	Candidate	Votes	%	±%
MQM	Farooq Sattar	109,952	59.29	
PPP	Abdul Aziz Memon	64,974	35.03	
JUI (F)	Muhammad Owais Siddiqui	7,647	4.12	
Others	Others (seven candidates)	2,884	1.56	
Turnout		188,091	61.76	
Total valid votes		185,457	98.60	
Rejected ballots		2,634	1.40	
Majority		44,978	24.26	
Registered electors		304,528		
MQM hold				

== Election 2024 ==
General elections were held on 8 February 2024 and Arshad Abdullah Vohra of Muttahida Qaumi Movement - Pakistan won by 30,573 votes and became a member of the National Assembly.

General election 2024: NA-240 Karachi South-II
Party	Candidate	Votes	%	±%
MQM-P	Arshad Abdullah Vohra	30,573	26.59	
PTI	Ramzan Ghanchi (Note: Filed nomination papers as PTI candidate but ECP allowed him to run as an Independent)	27,318	23.76	
TLP	Syed Zaman Ali Jafri	17,091	14.86	
PPP	Saleem Mandviwalla	17,025	14.81	
JI	Syed Abdul Rasheed	16,128	14.03	
Others	Others (fourteen candidates)	6,847	5.95	
Turnout		116,654	30.22	
Total valid votes		114,982	98.57	
Rejected ballots		1,672	1.43	
Majority		3,255	2.83	
Registered electors		385,971		
Muttahida Qaumi Movement - Pakistan win (new seat)				

== See also ==
- NA-239 Karachi South-I
- NA-241 Karachi South-III
