= List of international trips made by presidents of Pakistan =

The President of Pakistan is the head of state of the Islamic Republic of Pakistan. During the tenure presidents visit different countries. The following is the list of foreign trips of Presidents of Pakistan.

*Foreign visits (especially private visits) which don't include any considerable engagement are excluded from this list.

== Iskander Mirza ==
=== 1956 ===
| Country | Date/s | Engagements | Ref. |
|---|---|---|---|
| Turkey | July | State visit to Ankara. Addressed the Turkish National Assembly and held talks on bilateral relations and regional issues; a joint communiqué was issued. | |
| Kingdom of Afghanistan | 7–12 August | Official visit to Kabul. Met King Mohammed Zahir Shah; a joint communiqué affirmed the intention of Pakistan and Afghanistan to improve relations and remove differences through friendly negotiations. | |
| Pahlavi Iran | November | State visit to Tehran. Met Shah Mohammad Reza Pahlavi and addressed the Iranian Parliament during the Suez Crisis. | |
| Iraq | 17–22 November | Visited Baghdad for talks with the Muslim members of the Baghdad Pact. Attended the four-power meeting held in the presence of King Faisal II. | |
| Saudi Arabia | November | Informal visit to Saudi Arabia. Held talks with King Saud in an effort to persuade him of the importance of the Baghdad Pact. | |

=== 1957 ===
| Country | Date/s | Engagements | Ref. |
|---|---|---|---|
| Portugal | 11–13 November | Official visit to Lisbon. | |
| Spain | November | Official visit to Madrid. Met Francisco Franco and was received at the Royal Palace. | |

== Yahya Khan ==
=== 1969 ===
| Country | Date/s | Engagements | Ref. |
|---|---|---|---|
| Morocco | 22–25 September | Attended the First Islamic Summit Conference in Rabat. | |
| Pahlavi Iran | 29 October – 4 November | State visit to Tehran at the invitation of Shah Mohammad Reza Pahlavi. A joint communiqué was issued at the conclusion of the visit. | |

=== 1970 ===
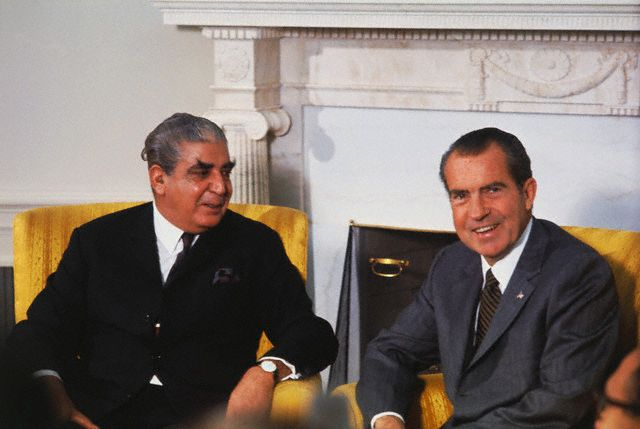
President of Pakistan Yahya Khan with President of the United States Richard Nixon in Washington, D.C., October 1970.

| Country | Date/s | Engagements | Ref. |
|---|---|---|---|
| Soviet Union | 22–25 June | State visit to Moscow. Met Chairman Nikolai Podgorny and Premier Alexei Kosygin and held talks in the Kremlin. | |
| Nepal | 27–30 September | State visit to Kathmandu. A joint communiqué was issued at the conclusion of the visit. | |
| United Kingdom | 18 October | Stopover in London. Spoke to Pakistani demonstrators outside Claridge's and reiterated his pledge to hand over power after the elected assembly framed a constitution. | |
| United States | 24–25 October | Official visit to the United States. Met President Richard Nixon at the White House in Washington, D.C., and discussed bilateral relations and contacts with China. | |
| France | 26 October | Stopover in Paris. Met President Georges Pompidou at the Élysée Palace. | |
| China | 10–14 November | State visit to Peking. Held talks with Premier Zhou Enlai and other Chinese leaders; a joint communiqué was issued at the conclusion of the visit. | |

=== 1971 ===
| Country | Date/s | Engagements | Ref. |
|---|---|---|---|
| Pahlavi Iran | 14–15 September | Short visit to Tehran. Met Shah Mohammad Reza Pahlavi for talks on bilateral and regional issues amid the South Asian crisis. | |
| Pahlavi Iran | 15–16 October | Attended the 2,500-year celebration of the Persian Empire at Persepolis. Met the Shah and other visiting leaders, and held talks with Soviet President Nikolai Podgorny before cutting short the trip. | |

== Fazal Ilahi Chaudhry ==
Under the 1973 Constitution, executive authority vested in the prime minister and the presidency was largely ceremonial during Chaudhry's tenure.

== Ghulam Ishaq Khan ==
=== 1989 ===
| Country | Date/s | Engagements | Ref. |
|---|---|---|---|
| Iran | 6 June | Visited Tehran to attend the funeral and last rites of Ayatollah Ruhollah Khomeini. | |

=== 1990 ===
| Country | Date/s | Engagements | Ref. |
|---|---|---|---|
| China | 20–23 September | State visit to Beijing. Attended the opening ceremony of the 1990 Asian Games and held talks with Chinese leaders; several agreements were signed. | |
| Japan | 10–12 November | Visited Tokyo to attend the enthronement ceremonies of Emperor Akihito. Met Prime Minister Toshiki Kaifu and other foreign leaders. | |

=== 1991 ===
| Country | Date/s | Engagements | Ref. |
|---|---|---|---|
| Iran | 12–15 September | State visit to Tehran. Met President Akbar Hashemi Rafsanjani, addressed the Islamic Consultative Assembly, and Pakistan and Iran concluded memorandums of understanding on railways, road construction, communications, postal cooperation, and oil and gas. | |

=== 1992 ===
| Country | Date/s | Engagements | Ref. |
|---|---|---|---|
| Turkey | 27 September – 1 October | Five-day visit to Turkey before travelling onward to Saudi Arabia. | |
| Saudi Arabia | 2 October | Short visit to Madina. Was received by Acting Governor of Madina Munawwarah, Nasir bin Saeed. | |

== Farooq Leghari ==
=== 1994 ===
| Country | Date/s | Engagements | Ref. |
|---|---|---|---|
| United States | 27 May | Visited New York City and addressed the Association of Pakistani Professionals. | |

=== 1995 ===
| Country | Date/s | Engagements | Ref. |
|---|---|---|---|
| Denmark | 11 March | Represented Pakistan at the World Summit for Social Development in Copenhagen and delivered Pakistan's national statement. | |
| Turkmenistan | 6–8 September | Official visit to Ashgabat. Met President Saparmurat Niyazov and held talks on bilateral relations and regional issues. | |
| Azerbaijan | 9–11 October | Official visit to Baku. Met President Heydar Aliyev, addressed the Milli Majlis, and signed agreements on economic cooperation and reciprocal investment protection. | |

=== 1996 ===
| Country | Date/s | Engagements | Ref. |
|---|---|---|---|
| Switzerland | 3 February | Visited Davos for the World Economic Forum annual meeting; also attended a dinner in Zurich hosted by Pakistan's ambassador. | |
| Turkmenistan | 14–15 May | Represented Pakistan at the 4th ECO Summit in Ashgabat and attended the signing of the gas pipeline agreement between Pakistan, Afghanistan and Uzbekistan. | |
| Uzbekistan | 18–20 October | Official visit to Tashkent. Met President Islam Karimov and discussed bilateral, regional and international issues. | |
| Kyrgyzstan | 26–28 October | Official visit to Bishkek. Met President Askar Akayev and held talks on economic, trade and cultural cooperation. | |

=== 1997 ===
| Country | Date/s | Engagements | Ref. |
|---|---|---|---|
| China | 29–30 April | Official visit to Beijing. Met President Jiang Zemin and other Chinese leaders for talks on bilateral, regional and international issues. | |
| United Arab Emirates | 24–26 May | State visit to Abu Dhabi. Met President Sheikh Zayed bin Sultan Al Nahyan and discussed bilateral ties, the situation in Afghanistan, South Asia and the Middle East. | |

== Rafiq Tarar ==
Under the 1973 Constitution, executive authority vested in the prime minister and the presidency was largely ceremonial during Tarar's tenure.

== Pervez Musharraf ==
Chief Executive: 12 October 1999 - 21 November 2002 President: 20 June 2001 - 18 August 2008

== Asif Ali Zardari ==
President: 9 September 2008 - 9 September 2013

== Mamnoon Hussain ==
President: 9 September 2013 - 9 September 2018

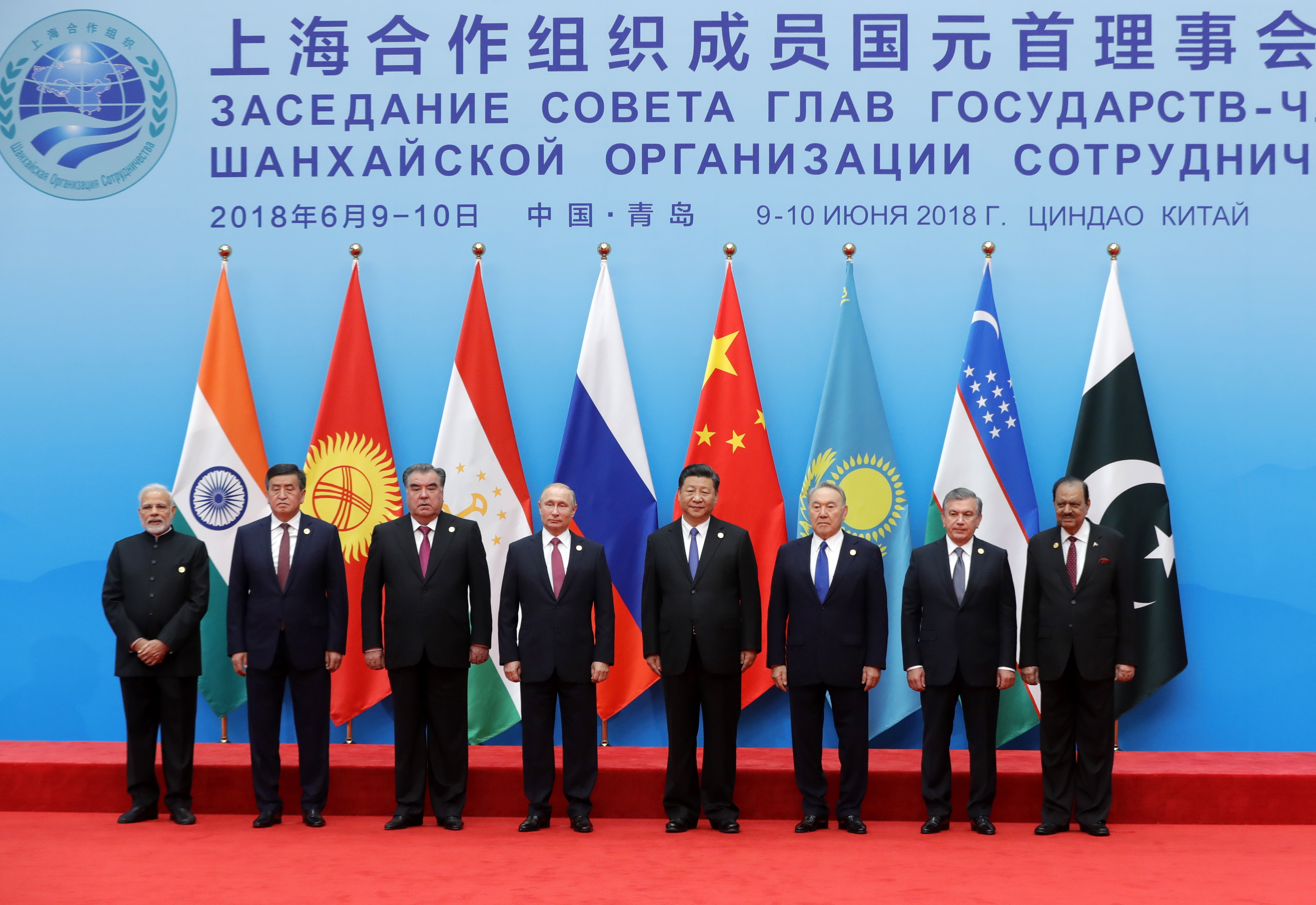
President of Pakistan Mamnoon Hussain at 18th SCO Head of State Summit in Qingdao, 10 June 2018.

=== 2013 ===
| Country | Date/s | Engagements | Ref. |
|---|---|---|---|
| South Africa | 9–15 December | Attended the funeral of Nelson Mandela. | |

=== 2014 ===
| Country | Date/s | Engagements | Ref. |
|---|---|---|---|
| China | 18–21 February | Met with President Xi Jinping, Premier Li Keqiang and Zhang Dejiang. | |
| Afghanistan | 27 March | Attended "Nawroz Festival" and met President Hamid Karzai. | |
| China | 20–22 May | Attended the "4th CICA Summit" and met President Xi. | |
| Nigeria | 9–12 June | Met with President of Nigeria, Goodluck Jonathan. | |
| Turkey | 28-29 August | Attended the "Inaugural Ceremony of President Recep Tayyip Erdoğan". | |
| Afghanistan | 29 September | Attended the "Inauguration Ceremony on President Ashraf Ghani" and met him. | |

=== 2015 ===
| Country | Date/s | Engagements | Ref. |
|---|---|---|---|
| Azerbaijan | 11-14 March | Met with President Ilham Aliyev. | |
| Turkey | 22-26 April | Met with President of Turkey Erdoğan. | |
| Saudi Arabia | 15-25 June | Met King Salman and performed Umrah. | |

=== 2016 ===
| Country | Date/s | Engagements | Ref. |
|---|---|---|---|
| Indonesia | 6–7 March | Attended the 5th Extraordinary OIC Summit. Met with President Joko Widodo. | |
| Sri Lanka | 8 March | Met with President of Sri Lanka Maithripala Sirisena. | |
| Turkey | 13-15 April | Attended "13th OIC Summit". Also met President of Turkey and Belarus, PM of Niger and Chief Executive of Afghanistan. | |
| Uzbekistan | 22–24 June | Attended the "16th SCO Head of States Summit". Held meeting with President of Uzbekistan. | |
| Qatar | 22–25 October | Met with Emir of Qatar Sheikh Tamim Bin Hamad Al-Thani. | |

=== 2017 ===
| Country | Date/s | Engagements | Ref. |
|---|---|---|---|
| Saudi Arabia | 7-18 June | Met King Salman and performed Umrah. | |
| Kazakhstan | 9-12 September | Attended the OIC Science and Technology Summit and Expo 2017. | |
| Turkmenistan | 16–18 September | Attended the Opening Ceremony of "5th Asian Indoor and Martial Arts Games". Also met President of Turkmenistan. | |

=== 2018 ===
| Country | Date/s | Engagements | Ref. |
|---|---|---|---|
| China | 8-10 June | Attended "2018 Qingdao SCO summit". Met with President Xi, also met Indian PM Modi (informally). | |
| Tajikistan | 19–22 June | Attended "International Decade for Action-Water for Sustainable Development 2018-28" conference. Also met President of Tajikistan. | |
| Turkey | 8–10 July | Attended the "2nd Inaugural Ceremony of President Erdoğan". | |
| UK | 26–27 August | Unofficial tour. Visited Kulsoom Nawaz in Hospital in London. Royal College of Physicians, Edinburgh had awarded honorary degree to President Mamnoon. | |

== Arif Alvi ==
President: 9 September 2018 - 10 March 2024

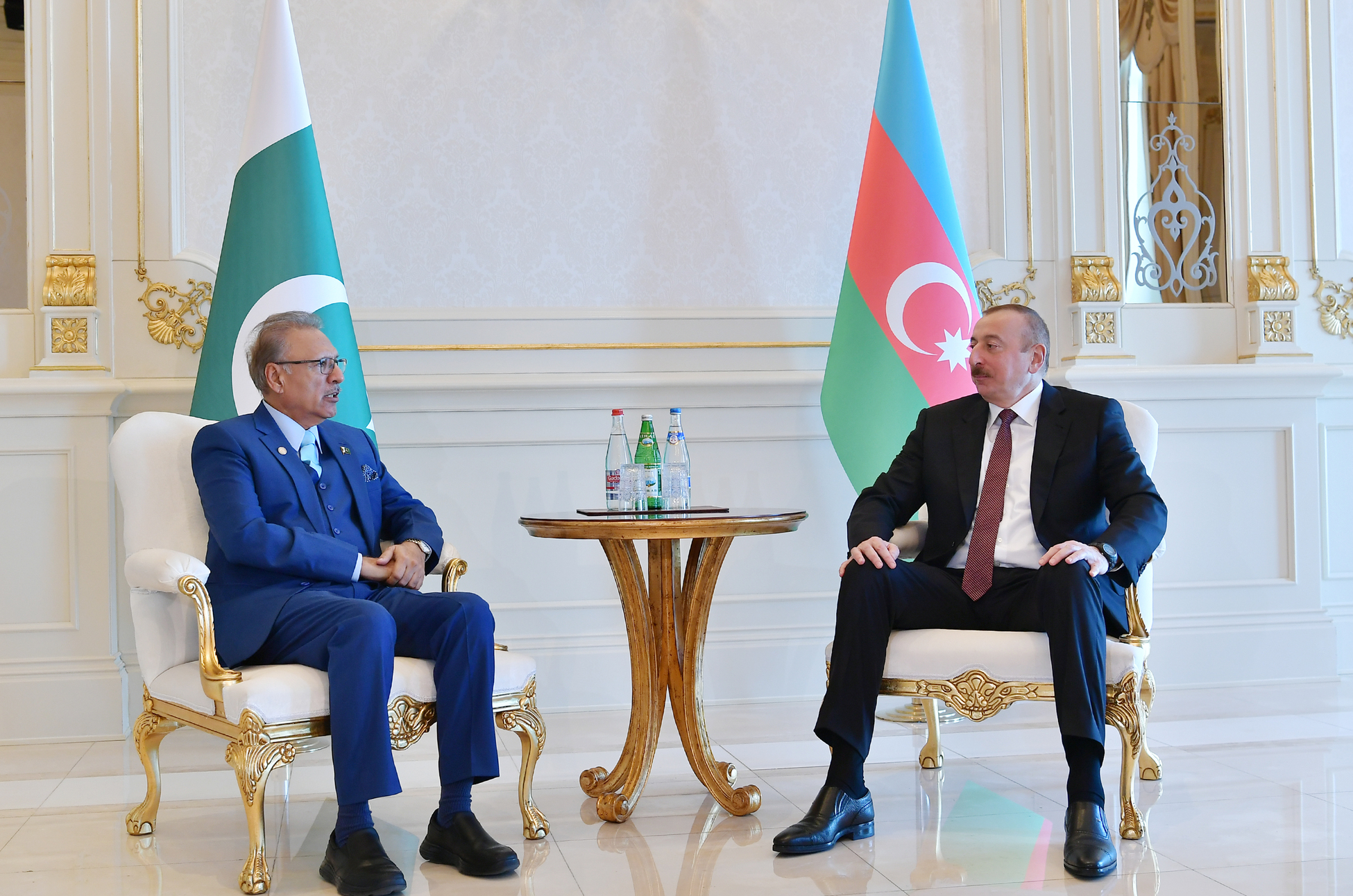
President of Pakistan Arif Alvi meeting with President of Azerbaijan Ilham Aliyev in Baku, 26 October 2019.

=== 2018 ===
| Country | Date/s | Engagements | Ref. |
|---|---|---|---|
| Turkey | 28–30 October | Met with President of Turkey and Kyrgyzstan. Attended inauguration of Istanbul Airport and reception on 95th Republic Day of Turkey. | |
| Saudi Arabia | 9–15 December | Met With King Salman Bin Abdul Aziz Al Saud. | |

=== 2019 ===
| Country | Date/s | Engagements | Ref. |
|---|---|---|---|
| Japan | 20-24 October | Met with PM Shinzo Abe and attended the "Enthronement Ceremony of Emperor Naruhito". | |
| Azerbaijan | 25-26 October | Attended 18th NAM Summit and met with President Ilham Aliyev | |

=== 2020 ===
| Country | Date/s | Engagements | Ref. |
|---|---|---|---|
| China | 16-17 March | President Arif met with his Chinese counterpart Xi Jinping. | |
| Kuwait | 5 October | Met with Emir of Kuwait Nawaf Al-Ahmad, condoles over death of Sabah Al-Ahmad. | |

=== 2021 ===
| Country | Date/s | Engagements | Ref. |
|---|---|---|---|
| Turkey | 14-16 August | President Arif Alvi met with President of Turkey. | |
| UAE | 9-10 October | President Arif Alvi inaugurates Pakistan Pavilion at Expo 2020. Met with Prime Minister of UAE Mohammed bin Rashid. | |
| Turkmenistan | 27-28 November | Attended "15th ECO Summit". Met with Presidents of Turkmenistan, Azerbaijan and Iran. | |

== Asif Ali Zardari ==
President: 10 March 2024 – present

== See also ==
- List of Presidents of Pakistan
- Foreign relations of Pakistan
