= Imran Ismail =

Pakistani businessman and politician

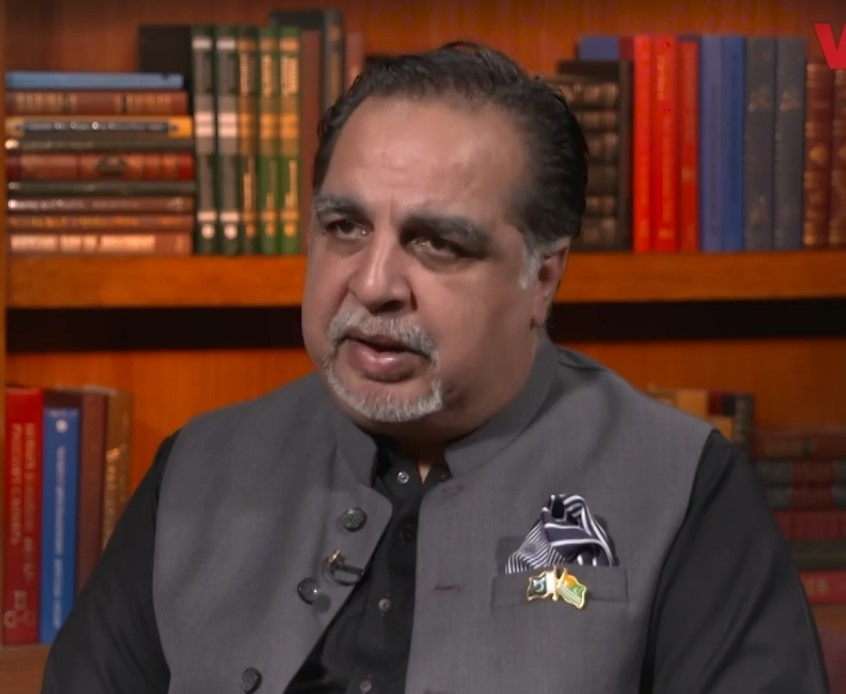

33rd Governor of Sindh
- In office 27 August 2018 – 18 April 2022
- President: Arif Alvi
- Prime Minister: Imran Khan; Shehbaz Sharif
- Preceded by: Muhammad Zubair Umar
- Succeeded by: Agha Siraj Durrani

Member of the Provincial Assembly of Sindh
- In office 13 August 2018 – 27 August 2018
- Constituency: PS-111 (Karachi South-V)

Personal details
- Born: 1 January 1966 (age 60) Karachi, Sindh, Pakistan

Imran Ismail (Urdu: عمران اسماعیل; born 1 January 1966) is a Pakistani businessman and politician. He served as the 33rd governor of Sindh from 27 August 2018 to 18 April 2022. Before being appointed Governor of Sindh, he was a member of the Provincial Assembly of Sindh for a brief period in August 2018.

He is one of the founding members of the IPP and was also one of the key founding members of the PTI in 1996. He parted ways with Imran Khan's PTI in May 2023 over the May 9 riots.

== Early life and education ==
He was born on 1 January 1966 in Karachi, Pakistan, into the Delhi Punjabi Saudagaran community.

He completed his matriculation from Cantt Public School and later attended Government National College, Karachi, for his undergraduate studies. He pursued further studies in leather and chemical technology from institutions in Italy and the United States, focusing on applied sciences in materials and industrial production.

== Professional career ==
Ismail previously served as the Chairman of the Finance Committee of the Karachi Chamber of Commerce and Industry (KCCI). He was also a member of the Managing Committee of the Korangi Association of Trade and Industry (KATI), where he contributed to various initiatives supporting industrial and commercial development.

== Political career ==
Ismail was one of the founding members of PTI in 1996. From its inception, Ismail played an instrumental role in building the party's organizational structure, particularly in Sindh, and worked closely with the leadership to promote PTI's reformist and anti-corruption agenda.

He ran for a seat in the Provincial Assembly of Sindh in the 1997 Sindh provincial election from PS-93 Karachi East-III as a candidate of the PTI, but was unsuccessful. He received 1,302 votes and was defeated by Waseem Akhtar, a candidate of the Haq Parast Group (HPG).

He ran for a seat in the Provincial Assembly of Sindh in the 2002 Pakistani General Election from PS-93 Karachi East-III as a candidate of the PTI, but was unsuccessful. He received 3926 votes and was defeated by Hameed Ullah Khan, a candidate of the Muttahida Majlis-e-Amal.

He ran for the seat of the National Assembly of Pakistan as a candidate of PTI from Constituency NA-246 (Karachi-VIII) in by-election held in April 2015 but was unsuccessful. He received 24,821 votes and lost the seat to Kunwar Naveed Jamil.

He was elected to the Provincial Assembly of Sindh as candidate of PTI from Constitutuency PS-111 (Karachi-XXIII) in the 2018 Pakistani general election.

On 6 August 2018, he was named by Imran Khan as Governor of Sindh. On 11 August 2018, he was formally nominated by PTI for the same office. On 13 August 2018, he took oath as member of the Sindh Assembly. The same day, he reaffirmed the PTI's commitment to demolish the security walls around Karachi's Bilawal House. On 23 August 2018, he was appointed as Governor of Sindh. His appointment as Governor drew criticism from academic experts who claimed Ismail, for being intermediate pass only, does not have the necessary academic qualifications for the office by arguing that Governor office makes him the chancellor of all state-run educational institution. On 27 August 2018, he resigned from his Sindh Assembly seat and took oath as Governor of Sindh. On 18 April 2022, Ismail resigned as Governor of Sindh.

In 2022, Ismail was injured during the attempted assassination of Imran Khan.

In 2023, in the aftermath of the 9 May riots which saw violent attacks on military installations and state-owned property following Imran Khan's arrest, Ismail resigned from all positions within PTI and announced his departure from the party during a press conference on 27 May 2023, condemning the violence and stating that the perpetrators "should be punished,” emphasizing that he had no involvement in the unrest.

== Other work ==
=== Music ===
During his involvement with PTI, Ismail featured in several official party music videos. In August 2017, he appeared alongside Shahzaman and Jawad Kahlown in Rok Sako To Rok Lo Tabdeeli Aayi Re, a PTI anthem released by Az Records that gained over 27 million views on YouTube. Imran Ismail notably contributed by writing the line Rok Sako To Rok Lo and performing in the video, which served as a campaign song for Imran Khan's message of political change. He later featured again in PTI tracks, including Saray Niklo Pakistan Ke Liye released in 2022.

== See also ==
- Governor of Sindh
- Governor of the Punjab
