= E-learning in Pakistan =

E-Learning, or educational technology, in Pakistan (with its ICT infrastructure) has developed mostly in the 21st century. Online universities and e-learning platforms in the country have also opened in recent years. The introduction of 3G/4G technology has contributed to the growth in m-learning (mobile learning), allowing the incorporation of e-learning in classrooms as well as in informal education. Education in Pakistan is under the administration of Federal and provincial governments, allowing multiple e-learning opportunities for individuals in Pakistan.

E-learning in Pakistan has become more popularized in 2020, due to the onset of the COVID-19 pandemic, which resulted in the closure of public and private educational institutes and the transition to online modes of learning. Efforts are being taken to train faculty members to improve the quality of their lectures and methods of virtual teaching. At the same time, the HEC is in contact with telecommunication companies to ensure internet connectivity through subsidised internet packages for students.

== Institutes offering online education in Pakistan ==
Several universities and educational institutions are currently offering online education in Pakistan.

1. Virtual University of Pakistan
2. Allama Iqbal Open University (AIOU)
3. Preston University
4. COMSATS University
5. University of Peshawar

=== Virtual University of Pakistan ===
See original article: Virtual University of Pakistan

Virtual University of Pakistan (VUP) is a public university based in Lahore. It was established in 2002. The university delivers virtual lectures through its cable channels on video-viewing platforms like YouTube and Daily Motion. Virtual University also offers a free online portal for digital skills training programs across the country, known as DigiSkills.

=== Allama Iqbal Open University ===
See original article: Allama Iqbal Open University

Established in 1974, the Allama Iqbal Open University has 44 regional campuses and centers across Pakistan. AIOU is one of the world's largest institutes for distance learning, and the largest distance learning institute in Pakistan. It offers SSC (secondary schooling) to PhD level education to students in Pakistan. AIOU provides e-learning facilities through virtual classrooms as well as providing interactive online study material. Moreover, it provides web-based assignment submission and assessment.

=== Preston University ===
See original article: Preston University

Preston University is a private university based in major Pakistani cities such as Karachi, Islamabad and Lahore. It was established in 1984 and has been offering online programs to students all over the country. Preston University was primarily established as the School of Business and Commerce and was recognized by the Higher Education Commission (HEC) Pakistan.

=== COMSATS University ===
See original article: COMSATS University

Located in Islamabad, the capital of Pakistan, COMSATS University Islamabad has a virtual campus. This campus is called CUI VC and it offers students online courses through asynchronous learning sessions.

==== Virtual lectures to students in rural Multan ====
COMSATS University began offering online lectures through COMSATS Internet. Students in Chak 5 Multan were able to receive lectures through this service from teachers in the capital city, Islamabad, campus. The university began focusing on higher education opportunities in other rural areas as well.

=== University of Peshawar ===
The University of Peshawar offers students distance learning opportunities. It provides resources like e-libraries, audio/video lectures, computer mediated instructions, and other web-enabled materials.

== Prime Minister's Laptop Scheme ==
See original article: Prime Minister's Laptop Scheme

Launched in 2013–14, the target of the Prime Minister's Laptop Scheme was to distribute 100,000 laptops to students in Pakistan and Azad Jammu and Kashmir (AJ&K). The ex-Prime Minister, Nawaz Sharif, directed the Government of Pakistan (PML-N) to initiate a national program to provide laptops to students who perform well academically. Selected students were given a laptop (manufactured by Haier) and a 3G EVO device. Students were also allowed access to HEC's National Digital Library using the 3G/4G EVO device.

This scheme was a part of the Prime Minister's Youth Programs. It was abolished by the Tehreek-e-Insaaf government in Pakistan.

== Free online courses with HEC and Coursera ==
The Higher Education Commission Pakistan (HEC) partnered with Coursera in 2018 to offer students 8,000 free online courses. These courses are offered from many international universities such as Princeton University, Cornell, Northwestern, Stanford, etc.

This initiative was launched for the purpose of spreading opportunities for digital learning among university students and providing the youth with skills required to gain good employment options and economic empowerment. Students who have appeared in the merit list for the Prime Minister's Laptop Scheme will be given the opportunity to access these free courses.

== Jazz Online Learning Opportunities ==
Pakistan's leading digital provider, Jazz, has launched the "Jazz Parho" campaign. The campaign is created for the purpose of providing remote learning opportunities to students across the country, particularly in light of the ongoing COVID-19 pandemic which has led to closure of schools in Pakistan. The "Jazz Parho" campaign includes affordable weekly and monthly data packages, the launch of an Android Application known as Jazz Parho, and the world's most affordable 4G mobile smart phone, known as the Digit 4G. Such efforts are aimed to make mobile and remote learning opportunities more affordable and accessible to students in Pakistan.

== Presidential Initiative for Artificial Intelligence and Computing (PIAIC) ==
The Presidential Initiative for Artificial Intelligence & Computing (PIAIC) was launched by the President of Pakistan, Dr. Arif Alvi, to promote education, research and business opportunities in Artificial intelligence, Blockchain, Internet of things, and Cloud native computing. PIAIC offers programs for distance learning as well as on-site learning, allowing students from across Pakistan to enroll online. However, students need to be present for exams onsite to enroll into the program and for examinations throughout the course of study.

The program has an initial target to enroll as many as 100,000 students within a year.

After a successful launch in Karachi with 12,000 students enrolling, PIAIC have started registering students in other major cities like Islamabad and Faisalabad and soon plan on offering programs in Lahore, Quetta, and Peshawar. These programs are year-long, initially holding one class a week. The classes are 4-hours long.

This initiative is a privately funded not-for-profit educational program that has partnership with non-profit and for-profit organizations like Panacloud, Saylani Welfare International Trust, and Pakistan Stock Exchange (PSX).

=== Women's Inclusion in Technology ===
One of the most important goals of the PIAIC was to provide a conduit for women to seek and find quality and affordable high tech training in most cities of Pakistan. This has resulted in creation of "Women’s Inclusion in Technology", a women's empowerment division in the PIAIC. The division is led by Hira Khan, who is also the COO of Panacloud (Pvt.), Ltd. and a well-seasoned IT trainer and software engineer. She has championed women's empowerment and especially their economic empowerment in Pakistan.
