= Cantonment (disambiguation) =

A cantonment is a military or police quarters.

Cantonment may also refer to:

== Ghana ==
- Cantonments, Accra, a residential suburb

== India ==
- Kollam Cantonment, a residential neighbourhood

== Malaysia ==
- Cantonment Road, a road in George Town, Penang

== Pakistan ==
- Cantonment (Pakistan), several permanent military bases
- Cantonment Public School, Karachi

== Singapore ==
- Cantonment Road, Singapore, a road in Singapore
  - Cantonment MRT station

== United States ==
- Cantonment, Florida, a town
- Cantonment, on the National Register of Historic Places listings in Blaine County, Oklahoma
