= Mirza Ikhtiar Baig =

Member of the National Assembly of Pakistan from Karachi (2024–2029)

- مرزا اختیار بیگ

Member of the National Assembly of Pakistan
- In office 29 February 2024 – 27 March 2026
- Preceded by: Khurrum Sher Zaman
- Constituency: NA-241 Karachi South-III

Personal details
- Born: Karachi, Sindh, Pakistan
- Party: PPP (2008-present)

Mirza Ikhtiar Baig (Urdu: مرزا اختیار بیگ) is a Pakistani politician who is member of the National Assembly of Pakistan.

== Political career ==
Baig won the 2024 Pakistani general election from NA-241 Karachi South-III as a Pakistan People’s Party Parliamentarians candidate. He received 52,456 votes while runners up Independent supported (PTI) Pakistan Tehreek-e-Insaf, candidate Khurrum Sher Zaman received 48,610 votes.
