= PS-110 Karachi South-V =

Constituency of the Provincial Assembly of Sindh, Pakistan

- Constituency for the Provincial Assembly of Sindh
- Region: Clifton Cantonment (partly) including Defense areas of Karachi South District in Karachi
- Electorate: 315,655

Current constituency
- Member: Vacant
- Created from: PS-113 Karachi-XXV (2002-2018); PS-111 Karachi South-V (2018-2023)

PS-110 Karachi South-V (پی ایس-۱۱۰ ، کراچی جنوبی-۵) is a constituency of the Provincial Assembly of Sindh. This constituency from 2002-2018 was demarcated as PS-113 Karachi-XXV, from 2018-2023 the Election Commission of Pakistan labelled this area as PS-111 Karachi South-V and after 2023 this constituency is presently PS-110 Karachi South-V.

== General elections 2024 ==
Provincial election 2024: PS-110 Karachi South-V
Party	Candidate	Votes	%	±%
Independent	Rehan Bandukda (Note: Filed nomination papers as PTI candidate but ECP allowed him to run as an Independent)	47,866	45.12	
JI	Sufyan	22,630	21.33	
PPP	Syed Najmi Alam	18,949	17.86	
PML(N)	Bahar Anwar	4,706	4.44	
Independent	Mohammad Jibran Nasir	3,834	3.61	
MQM-P	Mohammad Shariq Nasim	3,023	2.85	
TLP	Masood Ahmed	2,013	1.90	
Others	Others (thirty five candidates)	3,065	2.89	
Turnout		107,453	34.04	
Total valid votes		106,086	98.73	
Rejected ballots		1,367	1.27	
Majority		25,236	23.79	
Registered electors		315,655		
PTI gain from PPP				

== By elections 2018 ==
The seat became vacant after Imran Ismail resigned for Governor Sindh's post. By elections were held in the entire constituency on 21 October 2018 and Pakistan Tehreek-e-Insaf's Shahzad Qureshi won the seat in by-polls securing 12,455 votes and PPP Mohammed Fayaaz Pirzada coming second with 6,292 votes.

By Elections 2018: PS-111 (Karachi South-V)
Party	Candidate	Votes
PTI	Shahzad Qureshi	12455
PPP	Mohammed Fayaaz Pirzada	6292
MQM	Jehanzeb Mughal	2217
Independent	Mohammed Jibran Nasir	1291
TLP	Sikander Agar	353

== General elections 2018 ==
General elections are scheduled to be held on 25 July 2018.

General election 2018: PS-111 (Karachi South-V)
Party	Candidate	Votes	%	±%
PTI	Imran Ismail	30,578	41.77	
MMA	Sufian	8,754	11.96	
PPP	Murtaza Wahab	8,502	11.61	
PML(N)	Shaikh Jawaid Mir	6,401	8.74	
Independent	Mohammad Jibran Nasir	6,109	8.35	
MQM-P	Syed Mujahid Rasool	4,739	6.47	
PSP	Syed Mubashir Imam	2,419	3.30	
TLP	Tahira Kausar	1,477	2.02	
PST	Ali Nawab	1,475	2.02	
GDA	Zakria Hussain	738	1.01	
Independent	Abid	660	0.90	
Independent	Mian Ilyas Muhammad Abbasi	323	0.44	
AAT	Muhammad Asif	260	0.36	
Independent	Muhammad Ayaz	186	0.25	
Independent	Shaikh Samir Mir	168	0.23	
Independent	Terrance Augustin Francis	162	0.22	
Independent	Muhammad Fayyaz Pirzada	73	0.10	
Independent	Naimat Ullah Shaikh	56	0.08	
APML	Raheel Ahmed Shah	39	0.05	
PJDP	Faraz Faheem	37	0.05	
Independent	Ali Ahmed Rafiq Surmawala	14	0.02	
Independent	Younus Khan Afridi	13	0.02	
Independent	Nabeel Naveed Khan	9	0.01	
Independent	Ghulam Muhammad Banglani	8	0.01	
Total valid votes		73,200	41.59	
Rejected ballots		1,002		
Registered electors		178,401		

== General Elections 2013 ==
In 2013 this constituency was recognized as PS-113 (Karachi-XXV) by the Election Commission of Pakistan The elections were held on 11 May but there were abundant reports of election irregularities which resulted in the Election Commission of Pakistan declaring a re-polling a week later on 19 May 2013

On 18 May, a day before the re-polling, PTI leader Zahra Shahid Hussain was assassinated outside her house. The entire week, the Muttahida Qaumi Movement (MQM) had been appealing to the Election Commission of Pakistan to hold elections throughout the NA-250 constituency which also included PS-113, but their appeal was rejected. Ultimately MQM chose to boycott the re-polling on 19 May. Samar Ali Khan of PTI polled 38,247 votes with Saleem Zia of PML(N) coming second having polled 11,753 votes. Samar Ali Khan was declared as the Member of the Provincial Assembly of Sindh from this constituency of Karachi who

Party affiliation	Contesting candidates	Votes polled
PTI	Samar Ali Khan	38247
PML(N)	Saleem Zia	11753
MQM	Ali Rashid	10532
PPP	Asad Hussain Zuberi	1414
Independent	Muhammad Jibran Nasir	428

== General elections 2008 ==
Contesting candidates	Party affiliation	Votes polled

== General Elections 2002 ==
Party affiliation	Contesting candidates	Votes polled
MQM	Syed Akhtar Mehdi Bilgrami	8983
Muttahidda Majlis-e-Amal Pakistan	Khawaja Sharful Islam	8693
Pakistan Peoples Party Parliamentarians	Raja Kamran Khan	3915
Pakistan Muslim League(QA)	Dr. Rahim Ul Haq	2104
Pakistan Tehreek-e-Insaf	Syed Abdul Qayyum	1937

== See also ==
- PS-109 Karachi South-IV
- PS-111 Karachi Keamari-I
