= List of presidents of Pakistan =

Seal of the President of Pakistan

The president of Pakistan is the ceremonial head of state of the Islamic Republic of Pakistan. However throughout Pakistan's history, the President has constitutionally oscillated between a nominal role for ceremonial purposes and an executive role holding authority over policy-making.

The complete list of presidents of Pakistan includes the persons sworn into the office of president following the proclamation of the Islamic Republic of Pakistan in 1956.

There have been a total of 13 presidents. The first president was Iskander Ali Mirza who assumed office on 23 March 1956. The current office holder is Asif Ali Zardari, who took office on 10 March 2024, following his victory in the 2024 election.

== Line of succession and removal ==
The Constitution discusses the possibility of an acting president. in Chapter 1: The President, Part III: The Federation of Pakistan in the Constitution of Pakistan. Certain office-holders, however, are permitted to stand as presidential candidates in case of vacancy as the constitution does not include a position of vice president:

- The Chairman of the Senate of Pakistan
- The Speaker of the National Assembly of Pakistan. in Chapter 1: The President, Part III: The Federation of Pakistan in the Constitution of Pakistan.

== Key ==
Key for presidents list
Party name
Republican Party
Muslim League (C)
Armed Forces
Independent
Pakistan Muslim League (Q)
Pakistan People's Party
Pakistan Muslim League (N)
Pakistan Tehreek-e-Insaf

== Presidents ==
No.	Portrait	Name (Birth–Death)	Term of office			Political party	Elected
No.	Portrait	Name (Birth–Death)	Took office	Left office	Time in office	Political party	Elected
Executive Role
1		Iskandar Ali Mirza سکندر علی مرزا (1899–1969)	23 March 1956	27 October 1958	2 years, 218 days	Republican	1956
2		Ayub Khan ایوب خان (1907–1974)	27 October 1958	8 June 1962	3 years, 224 days	Army	–
2		Ayub Khan ایوب خان (1907–1974)	8 June 1962	25 March 1969	6 years, 290 days	PMLC	1965
3		Yahya Khan یحییٰ خان (1917–1980)	25 March 1969	20 December 1971	2 years, 270 days	Army	–
4		Zulfikar Ali Bhutto ذولفقار علی بھٹو (1928–1979)	20 December 1971	14 August 1973	1 year, 237 days	PPP	1970
Ceremonial Role
5		Fazal Elahi Chaudhry فضل الہیٰ چودھری (1904–1982)	14 August 1973	16 September 1978	5 years, 33 days	PPP	1973
Executive Role
6		Muhammad Zia-ul-Haq محمد ضیا الحق (1924–1988)	16 September 1978	17 August 1988 †	9 years, 336 days	Army	–
Ceremonial Role
7		Ghulam Ishaq Khan غلام اسحاق خان (1915–2006)	17 August 1988	18 July 1993	4 years, 335 days	IND	1988
—		Wasim Sajjad وسیم سجاد (born 1941) acting	18 July 1993	14 November 1993	119 days	PMLN	–
8		Farooq Leghari فاروق لغاری (1940–2010)	14 November 1993	2 December 1997	4 years, 18 days	PPP	1993
—		Wasim Sajjad وسیم سجاد (born 1941) acting	2 December 1997	1 January 1998	30 days	PMLN	–
9		Muhammad Rafiq Tarar محمد رفیق تاڑر (1929–2022)	1 January 1998	20 June 2001	3 years, 170 days	PMLN	1997
Executive Role
10		Pervez Musharraf پرویز مشرف (1943–2023)	20 June 2001	15 October 2007	6 years, 117 days	Army	2004
10		Pervez Musharraf پرویز مشرف (1943–2023)	19 November 2007	18 August 2008	273 days	PML(Q)	2007
Ceremonial Role
—		Muhammad Mian Soomro محمد میاں سومرو (born 1950) acting	18 August 2008	9 September 2008	22 days	PML(Q)	–
11		Asif Ali Zardari آصف علی زرداری (born 1955)	9 September 2008	9 September 2013	5 years	PPP	2008
12		Mamnoon Hussain ممنون حسین (1940–2021)	9 September 2013	9 September 2018	5 years	PMLN	2013
13		Arif Alvi عارف علوی (born 1949)	9 September 2018	10 March 2024	5 years, 183 days	PTI	2018
14		Asif Ali Zardari آصف علی زرداری (born 1955)	10 March 2024	Incumbent	2 years, 195 days	PPP	2024

== See also ==
- List of heads of state of Pakistan
- Governor-General of Pakistan
- President of Pakistan
  - List of international trips made by presidents of Pakistan
- Vice President of Pakistan
- Prime Minister of Pakistan
  - List of prime ministers of Pakistan
