= Shahzad Qureshi =

Pakistani politician

Member of the Provincial Assembly of Sindh
- In office 22 October 2018 – 11 August 2023
- Constituency: PS-111 Karachi South-V

Personal details
- Born: Karachi, Sindh, Pakistan
- Party: PTI (2018-present)

Shahzad Qureshi is a Pakistani politician who had been a member of the Provincial Assembly of Sindh from October 2018 to August 2023.

== Political career ==
He was elected to the Provincial Assembly of Sindh from Constituency PS-111 (Karachi South-V) as a candidate of Pakistan Tehreek-e-Insaf in by-election held on 21 October 2018.
