= 2018 Pakistani presidential election =

Election for the 13th President of Pakistan

- 4 September 2018

679 votes in the Electoral College (Note: The total size of the electoral college is 706. But considering the vacant seats, the electoral college for 2018 presidential election stood at 679.) Plurality needed to win
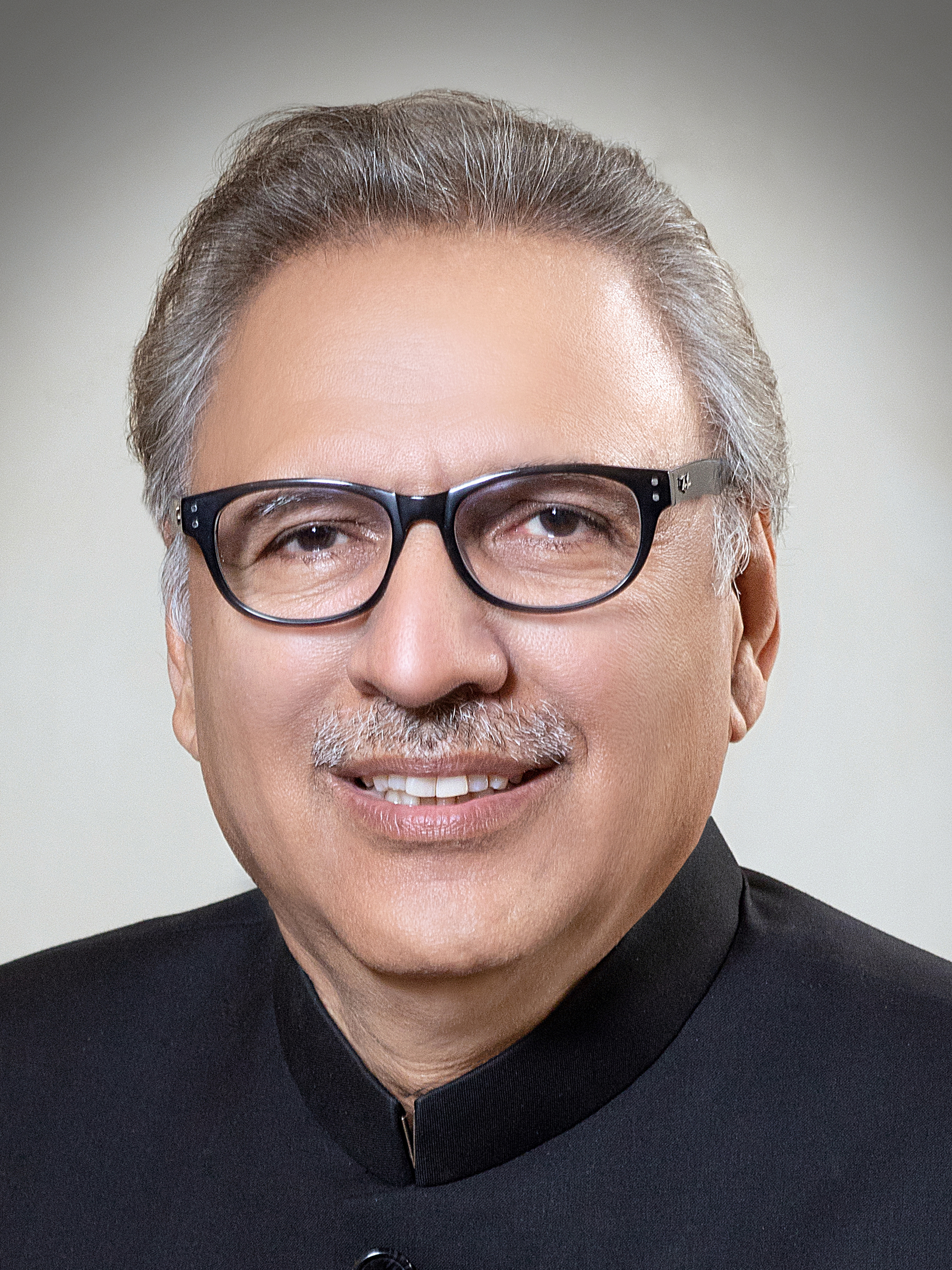

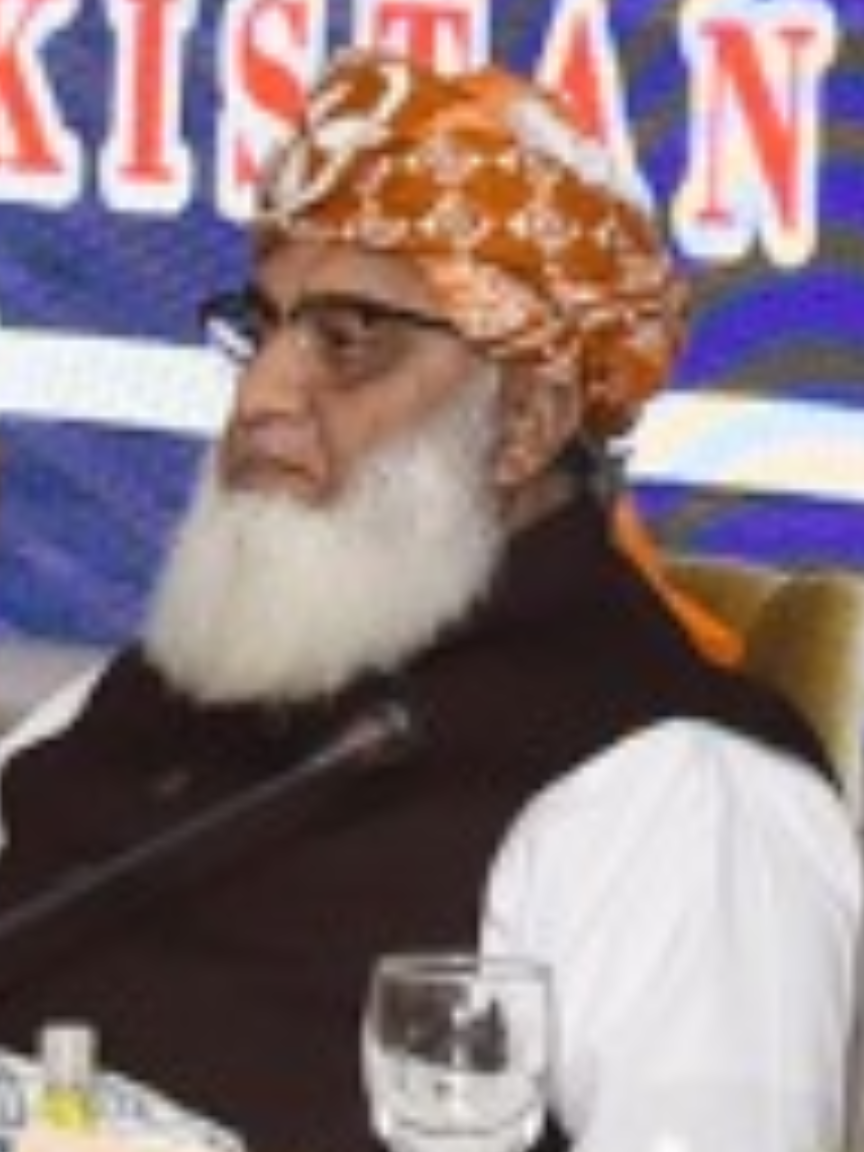

Candidate	Arif Alvi	Fazal-ur-Rehman	Aitzaz Ahsan
Party	PTI	JUI (F)	PPP
Home state	Sindh	KPK	Punjab
Electoral vote	352	184	124
States carried	3 + ICT	0	1
Percentage	53.33%	27.88%	18.79%
President of Pakistan before election
Mamnoon Hussain
PMLN
Elected President of Pakistan
Arif Alvi
PTI

Presidential elections were held in Pakistan on 4 September 2018. The elections saw Arif Alvi of PTI being elected as the 13th president of Pakistan after defeating Fazal-ur-Rehman of MMA and Aitzaz Ahsan of PPP. Although incumbent president Mamnoon Hussain, whose term was to expire on 9 September 2018, was eligible for re-election, he declined to take part.

The PTI-led government coalition nominated a founding member of the party Arif Alvi, right after a week of the announcement of the official victory of PTI in the general elections. The PPP on the other hand took a solo flight in announcing the candidature of PPP stalwart, a law expert and a veteran politician Aitzaz Ashan without having done the consensus with the remaining opposition. Against PTI's Alvi and PPP's Ahsan, the PML-N-led Opposition came up with Fazal-ur-Rehman, the leader of Far-right Islamist MMA, as their joint candidate.

The Elections witnessed a decisive victory for Arif Alvi who managed to get 352 votes from the Electoral College. Opposition's Fazal-ur-Rehman followed with 184 votes, while Aitzaz Ahsan got only 124 votes. Alvi managed to emerge victorious in Punjab, KPK, and Balochistan, as well as the Parliament. Meanwhile, Aitzaz Ahsan was triumphant in Sindh. Although having a higher vote count than Ahsan, Fazal-ur-Rehman wasn't able to win in the Parliament or any Provincial Assembly.

President-elect Arif Alvi was sworn in as the 13th president of Pakistan on 9 September 2018.

== Schedule ==
The Election Commission of Pakistan announced the initial election schedule on 16 August 2018. Polling was conducted on following five places on 4 September 2018:

- Parliament House at Islamabad
- Punjab Provincial Assembly at Lahore
- Sindh Provincial Assembly at Karachi
- KPK Provincial Assembly at Peshawar
- Baluchistan Provincial Assembly at Quetta

Members of Senate and National Assembly cast their vote at Parliament House whereas members of Provincial Assemblies cast their vote at respective assemblies.

== Electoral system ==
The president of Pakistan is indirectly elected by the Electoral College of Pakistan – a joint sitting of the Senate, National Assembly and Provincial Assemblies.

The votes of the members of the Senate and National Assembly are counted as single votes. Meanwhile, the votes given by the provincial assembly legislators are adjusted so as to give each province an equal share in the election. This is so because, each provincial assembly has a varying number of members, depending upon population size. The largest province by population size, Punjab, has a total of 371 members in its assembly, whereas the smallest province of Balochistan has a mere 65 members in its legislature. Therefore, the provincial votes are weighted against the Balochistan assembly in the following manner:

Provincial Assembly	Members	Weightage of each vote	Total votes
Balochistan	65	1	65
Khyber-Pakhtunkhwa	124	0.524	65
Punjab	371	0.175	65
Sindh	168	0.387	65

Regarding timing, the constitution states that election to the office of President must be held no earlier than sixty days and no later than thirty days before the expiration of the term of the incumbent president. If assemblies are not present, the constitution allows the election of president to be delayed thirty days after the general election.

The electoral process itself is done via a secret ballot due to the post of the president being constitutionally non-partisan. Therefore, unlike during the election of the Prime Minister, cross-party voting is not liable to be considered defection.

== Electoral College ==
The Electoral College of Pakistan is formed by a joint sitting of the six leading political bodies in Pakistan:

- the Senate of Pakistan,
- the National Assembly of Pakistan,
- the Provincial Assembly of the Punjab,
- the Provincial Assembly of Sindh,
- the Provincial Assembly of Balochistan and
- the Provincial Assembly of Khyber Paktunkhwa

The maximum strength of the electoral college is 706. However, considering the vacant seats, the electoral college for this presidential election stood at 679. A simple majority is required in a two-candidate contest to claim victory. But in a three-candidate race, the victory requirement goes down considerably depending on how the votes are split.

The weighted votes of each political party in the six bodies constituting the electoral college are as follows:

Body	PTI	PMLN	PPP	MQM-P MQM-L	JUI (F)	PML(Q)	BAP	GDA	IND	BNP(M)	ANP	BNP(A)	AML	HDP	PkMAP	TLP	JWP	NP
National Assembly	151	81	54	7	15	3	5	3	4	4	1	0	1	0	0	0	1	0
Senate	12	31	20	5	6	0	7	1	15	1	1	0	0	0	5	0	0	5
Punjab Assembly	30	28	1	0	0	2	0	0	1	0	0	0	0	0	0	0	0	0
Sindh Assembly	12	0	38	8	0	0	0	5	0	0	0	0	0	0	0	1	0	0
Balochistan Assembly	6	1	0	0	12	0	23	0	4	9	4	3	0	1	1	0	1	0
KPK Assembly	40	3	3	0	7	1	0	0	2	0	4	0	0	0	0	0	0	0
Total (weighted)	251	144	116	33	40	6	28	9	22	14	10	3	1	1	6	1	2	5

== Candidates ==
=== Confirmed ===
- Arif Alvi: PTI member of the National Assembly from NA-241 Karachi South-III. Nominated by Prime Minister Imran Khan on 18 August 2018.
- Aitzaz Ahsan: PPP former member of the Senate from Punjab. Nominated by Asif Ali Zardari on 19 August 2018.
- Fazal-ur-Rehman: Joint Candidate of JUI (F), PMLN and various other opposition parties. Nominated by Shehbaz Sharif on 27 August 2018.

=== Withdrawn ===
- Amir Muqam: President of PMLN in KPK and former MNA. Withdrew his nomination papers following the joint nomination of Fazal-ur-Rehman.

== Voting ==
The voting started at around 10:00 am PST. Prime Minister Imran Khan came to the Parliament House and cast his vote with an hour left in the voting deadline. The voting ended at 04:00 pm PST.

== Results ==
Results of the 2018 Pakistani presidential election
Candidate	Party	Electoral college					Total votes	%	Total weighted	%
Candidate	Party	Parliament of Pakistan	Provincial Assembly of the Punjab	Provincial Assembly of Sindh	Provincial Assembly of Balochistan	Provincial Assembly of Khyber Pakhtunkhwa	Total votes	%	Total weighted	%
Arif Alvi	PTI	212	186	56	45	78	577	53.28	352	53.33
Fazal-ur-Rehman	JUI (F)	131	141	1	15	26	314	28.99	184	27.88
Aitzaz Ahsan	PPP	81	6	100	0	5	192	17.83	124	18.79
Valid votes		424	333	157	60	109	1083	97.65	660	100
Invalid/blank votes		6	18	1	1	0	26	2.35	-	-
Total		430	351	158	61	109	1109	100	-	-
Abstention		16	20	10	4	15	65	5.54	-	-
Registered voters/turnout		446	371	168	65	124	1174	94.46	-	-
