= Wasim Bari =

Pakistani cricketer (born 1948)

Personal information
- Born: 23 March 1948 (age 78); Karachi, Federal Capital Territory, Pakistan
- Batting: Right-handed
- Bowling: Right-arm fast
- Role: Wicket-keeper

International information
- National side: Pakistan (1967–1984)
- Test debut (cap 54): 27 July 1967 v England
- Last Test: 2 January 1984 v Australia
- ODI debut (cap 10): 11 February 1973 v New Zealand
- Last ODI: 30 January 1984 v Australia

Career statistics
| Competition | Test | ODI |
|---|---|---|
| Matches | 81 | 51 |
| Runs scored | 1366 | 971 |
| Batting average | 15.88 | 17.00 |
| 100s/50s | 0/11 | 0/5 |
| Top score | 85 | 88 |
| Balls bowled | 8 | – |
| Wickets | 0 | – |
| Bowling average | – | – |
| 5 wickets in innings | – | – |
| 10 wickets in match | – | – |
| Best bowling | – | – |
| Catches/stumpings | 201/27 | 52/10 |
- Source: ESPNCricinfo, 4 February 2017

Wasim Bari (Urdu: وسیم باری; born 23 March 1948) is a Pakistani former international cricketer who played in 81 Test matches and 51 One Day Internationals from 1967 to 1984. Bari was a wicket-keeper and right-handed batsman. He captained Pakistan in Test matches and one-day internationals. At the end of his 17-year career, he was the most-capped player in Pakistani Test history.

In June 2009, Bari was named as the interim chief selector of the Pakistan national cricket team.

== Career ==
His talent was first recognised in 1967 with members of the England under-25 team stating that he was the best keeper to come out of South Asia. It was in England where he made his Test match debut, with Colin Milburn being his first dismissal. With the bat he managed 15.88 per innings in his career, including an innings of 60 not out at number 11, in which he helped score a last wicket partnership of 133 with Wasim Raja.

According to Tony Greig, commentator and former England captain, most people believe Alan Knott was the best wicket-keeper to have played the game in that era but Knott himself believed Bari was better than him. Imran Khan, who persuaded Wasim Bari from retiring earlier, believed he was as good as Knott.

In 1971 at Leeds, he equalled the then world record of 8 catches in a Test match. He was in the record books again in 1976/77 by stumping 4 batsmen in a Test, against the Australians. In 1979 against New Zealand he caught 7 of the first 8 batsmen, creating a world record for most dismissals in a Test innings. He finished his career with 228 Test victims, the most by a Pakistani and the most by a South Asian keeper at the time. Among South Asians, only M S Dhoni has more catches and stumpings in Test cricket, although Dhoni has played nine more Tests compared to Bari.

Wasim Bari captained Pakistan in 6 Test matches and five one-day internationals, all of them against England home and away, at a time when Pakistan was deprived of some of its best and most recognisable players, such as Imran Khan, Zaheer Abbas, Majid Khan and Mushtaq Mohammed, by Kerry Packer's World Series Cricket. He was caught up in the middle of a controversy during the tour to England regarding the growing practice of short-pitched bowling at tailender batsmen after Iqbal Qasim was forced to retire hurt after being hit by Bob Willis in the first Test at Birmingham.

== Education ==
He was educated at the Cantonment Public School, Karachi.

| Preceded by Mushtaq Mohammad | Pakistan Cricket Captain; 1978 | Succeeded by Asif Iqbal |
