= PS-108 Karachi South-III =

Constituency of the Provincial Assembly of Sindh, Pakistan

- Constituency for the Provincial Assembly of Sindh
- Region: Garden town (partly) of Karachi South District in Karachi
- Electorate: 253,208

Current constituency
- Member: Vacant
- Created from: PS-110 Karachi-XXII (2002-2018); PS-109 Karachi South-III (2018-2023)

PS-108 Karachi South-III (پی ایس-108، کراچی جنوبی-3) is a constituency of the Provincial Assembly of Sindh.

== General elections 2024 ==
Provincial election 2024: PS-108 Karachi South-III
Party	Candidate	Votes	%	±%
MQM-P	Muhammad Dilawar	20,014	26.04	
Independent	Murad Sheikh (Note: Filed nomination papers as PTI candidate but ECP allowed him to run as an Independent)	16,966	22.08	
JI	lbrat	14,438	18.79	
TLP	Sultan Ahmed	9,457	12.31	
PPP	Mammad Fayyaz	9,438	12.28	
Independent	Muhammad Tahsen	1,232	1.60	
Independent	Shehroz	1,156	1.50	
Independent	Raghib Bashir	835	1.09	
Others	Others (twenty two candidates)	3,320	4.31	
Turnout		76,856	30.35	
Total valid votes		76,856	100	
Rejected ballots		0	0.00	
Majority		3,048	3.96	
Registered electors		253,208		
MQM-P gain from PTI				

== General elections 2018 ==
Provincial election 2018: PS-109 Karachi South-III
Party	Candidate	Votes	%	±%
PTI	Ramzan Ghanchi	25,345	28.98	
TLP	Ahmed	19,913	22.77	
MQM-P	Muhammad Tahir	15,188	17.37	
MMA	Muhammad Faisal	8,514	9.74	
PPP	Abdul Rasheed Noorani	7,971	9.11	
PSP	Muhammad Dilawar	5,345	6.11	
PML(N)	Tanveer Ahmed Khan	4,212	4.82	
APML	Abdullah Niaz	229	0.26	
Independent	Aamir Nawaz	181	0.21	
Independent	Sakina Anwar	166	0.19	
GDA	Syed Muhammad Khurrum Shah	135	0.15	
Independent	Arif	85	0.10	
Independent	Jerjis Ali Hoti	72	0.08	
Independent	Muhammad Kamran	26	0.03	
Independent	Jahanzaib	24	0.03	
Independent	Raghib Bashir	22	0.03	
Independent	Syed Pervaiz Ali Shah Jeelani	18	0.02	
Independent	Humayun Sultan	4	0.01	
Majority		5,432	6.21	
Valid ballots		87,450		
Rejected ballots		1,232		
Turnout		88,682		
Registered electors		236,481		
hold				

== General elections 2013 ==
Contesting candidates	Party affiliation	Votes polled

== General elections 2008 ==
Contesting candidates	Party affiliation	Votes polled

== See also ==
- PS-107 Karachi South-II
- PS-109 Karachi South-IV
