= Arshad Abdullah Vohra =

Vice-Chairman of PSP
- In office 12 October 2017 – 12 January 2023

Provincial Assembly of Sindh
- In office 30 August 2016 – 13 March 2019

28th Deputy mayor of Karachi
- In office May 2013 – December 2015
- Preceded by: Nasreen Jalil
- Succeeded by: Arshad Hassan

Member of the National Assembly of Pakistan
- Incumbent
- Assumed office 29 February 2024
- Constituency: NA-240 Karachi South-II

Personal details
- Born: Karachi, Sindh, Pakistan
- Party: MQM-P (2023-present)
- Other political affiliations: PSP (2017-2023); MQM-L (2013-2016)
- Occupation: Businessman, Politician

Arshad Abdullah Vohra (Urdu: ارشد عبدُﷲ ووہرہ; born 17 July 1958) is a Pakistani politician who has been a member of the National Assembly of Pakistan since February 2024. He was the vice-chairman of Pak Sarzameen Party. He is a former deputy mayor of Karachi and ex-parliamentarian of Sindh. He is a professional engineer with a doctorate and a businessman.

== Personal life ==
Vohra was born on 17 July 1958 in Karachi, Pakistan, to an Urdu-speaking Gujarati Sunni Vohra family.

Arshad was elected twice as the chairman of SITE Association, in 2001–02 and 2012–13. He also served as the chairman of All Pakistan Textile Mills Association (APTMA) in 2005–2006.

== Political career ==
=== Provincial Assembly of Sindh ===
He was elected Member Provincial Assembly of Sindh in May 2013. He resigned from his post after he was nominated deputy mayor of Karachi from MQM.

=== Deputy mayor of Karachi ===
He was elected deputy mayor of Karachi on 24 August 2016. He took oath in his office on 30 August 2016.

=== Departure from MQM and joining PSP ===
In October 2017, Arshad Vohra left Muttahida Qaumi Movement and joined the Pak Sarzameen Party. He said in a press conference, with Anis Kaimkhani, that MQM-P "had no vision" which was a major reason as to why he left MQM.

== See also ==
- Mayor of Karachi
