= Aitzaz Ahsan =

Pakistani politician and lawyer (born 1945)

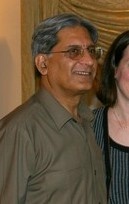

Leader of the Opposition in Senate of Pakistan
- In office 21 March 2012 – 21 March 2018
- Succeeded by: Sherry Rehman
- In office 20 March 1994 – 20 March 2000

Leader of the House of Federation
- In office 12 March 2012 – 12 March 2015
- Prime Minister: Yusuf Raza Gillani; Raja Pervaiz Ashraf; Nawaz Sharif
- Succeeded by: Raja Zafar-ul-Haq
- In office 21 March 1993 – 20 March 1997
- Prime Minister: Benazir Bhutto

26th Minister for Interior and Narcotics Control
- In office 4 December 1988 – 6 August 1990
- President: Ghulam Ishaq Khan
- Prime Minister: Benazir Bhutto
- Preceded by: Malik Nasim Ahmad
- Succeeded by: Chaudhry Shujaat Hussain

Federal Minister for Parliamentary Affairs
- In office 4 December 1988 – 6 August 1990
- President: Ghulam Ishaq Khan
- Prime Minister: Benazir Bhutto

Federal Minister for Education
- In office 1988–1990
- President: Ghulam Ishaq Khan
- Prime Minister: Benazir Bhutto

Minister for Law and Justice
- In office 4 December 1988 – 28 December 1988
- President: Ghulam Ishaq Khan
- Prime Minister: Benazir Bhutto
- Preceded by: Rana Sanaullah
- Succeeded by: Ashtar Ausaf Ali

Provincial Minister of Punjab for Information and Culture
- In office 1975–1977

Provincial Minister of Punjab for Planning and Development
- In office 1975–1977

Member of the Senate
- In office 2012–2018
- In office 1993–1999

Member of the National Assembly
- In office 18 November 2002 – 18 November 2007
- Constituency: NA-124 Lahore-VII
- In office 1990–1993
- Constituency: Lahore
- In office 2 December 1988 – 3 November 1990
- Constituency: Lahore

Member of Provincial Assembly
- In office 1975–1977
- Constituency: PP-28 Gujrat

Personal details
- Born: 27 September 1945 (age 81) Murree, Punjab Province, British India
- Party: PPP (1970-1977) (1980-Present)
- Education: Government College, Lahore
- Alma mater: Downing College, Cambridge
- Occupation: Lawyer (Rtd)

Chaudhary Aitzaz Ahsan (Punjabi, Urdu: چودھری اعتزاز احسن; born 27 September 1945) is a Pakistani politician and lawyer. He served as the Leader of the House in the Senate of Pakistan from 1994 to 1996, and as the Leader of the Opposition from 1996 till 2000 and again from 2012 to 2018. He was elected a member of the Senate of Pakistan from Punjab in 1994. His tenure ended in March 2018.

Born in Murree, Ahsan studied law at the Government College, Lahore and received an LLM from the Downing College, Cambridge. Ahsan became the Planning and Development Minister for Punjab in 1975. After the Operation Fair Play coup, Ahsan became a prominent figure of the Movement for the Restoration of Democracy. Ahsan was elected to the National Assembly from Lahore in 1988 and served as the interior minister of Pakistan under Benazir Bhutto's first government and served until 1990.

Ahsan was elected as a member of the Senate in 1994. He re-joined the cabinet after Benazir's re-election, and went on to serve as the Minister for Law, Justice and Human Rights until 1997. He served as the minority leader in the Senate between 1996 and 1999. Ahsan was elected to the National Assembly again in 2002, and went on to serve as the president of the Supreme Court Bar Association between 2007 and 2008. Ahsan was elected to the Senate in 2012 and in 2015 became the minority leader.

== Early life and education ==
Ahsan was born on 27 September 1945, in Murree, British Punjab. He belongs to a Punjabi Jat family of the Warraich clan, and grew up in Lahore.

He received his early education from Aitchison College. He then enrolled in Government College Lahore and later studied law at Downing College, Cambridge. He was at Gray's Inn in 1967. He then appeared in Central Superior Services examination where he reportedly topped. However, he did not join the government service.

== Political career ==
Ahsan returned to Pakistan in 1967. He joined Pakistan Peoples Party (PPP) and began his political career in 1970s. He was elected as the member of the Provincial Assembly of the Punjab for first time on the ticket of PPP j on by-elections held following the Pakistan General elections of 1977 from Gujrat constituency. He was inducted in the provincial cabinet of Punjab and was appointed the Provincial Minister for information, planning and development. Ahsan was in his twenties during his tenure as provincial minister. He resigned from the provincial cabinet and left PPP following the incident in which Punjab Police opened fire on a rally of lawyers during the Pakistan National Alliance demonstrations against the alleged rigging of elections by the PPP government in 1977. Ahsan joined Tehrik-e-Istiqlal.

He rejoined the PPP following the Operation Fair Play and actively became involved with the Movement for the Restoration of Democracy and for his participation in the MRD, he was repeatedly imprisoned. He was reportedly jailed for two years during Zia -ul-Haq presidency. He was elected as the member of the National Assembly of Pakistan on PPP ticket for the first time in Pakistan General elections of 1988 from Lahore constituency. He was inducted into federal cabinet and was appointed the Minister for Law and Justice, along with the additional portfolio of the Ministry of Interior and Narcotics Control. He was re-elected as the member of the National Assembly of Pakistan on PPP ticket for the second time in Pakistan General elections of 1990 from Lahore constituency.

He lost the Pakistan General elections of 1993 to Humayun Akhtar Khan of Pakistan Muslim League. In 1994 he was elected as the member of the Senate of Pakistan for the first time representing PPP, where he sat as Leader of the Opposition until 1999. In Pakistan General elections of 2002, he ran for the membership of the National Assembly on PPP seat from two constituencies. He was re-elected as the member of the National Assembly for the third time from constituencies of Bahawalpur and Lahore. He retained his Lahore seat. Ahsan did not run in the Pakistan General elections of 2008 due to his involvement in the Lawyers' Movement for the restoration of deposed judges.

Ahsan was elected as the member of the Senate for the second time in the 2012 Pakistani Senate election on technocrat seat representing PPP. In 2013, he reportedly resigned from Senate membership. In 2013, Ahsan became opposition leader in the Senate. In 2015, he for the second time became opposition leader in the Senate.

In late August 2018, Ahsan was nominated by the PPP as a candidate for the 2018 presidential election according to media reports. On 4 September 2018, he clinched 124 electoral votes behind Arif Alvi (352) and Fazal-ur-Rehman (184) in the election.

The notification of the suspension of his basic membership was accepted by the PPP on 14 October 2022 as a result of Ahsan "going against party discipline". A few days before this, Ahsan openly criticized the Sharifs, the political family that headed the PML(N), which was a coalition partner of the PPP at the time. He also criticized the Chief of Army Staff General Qamar Javed Bajwa in the same speech, accusing him of committing a crime for allegedly helping the Sharifs get acquitted in different corruption cases.

== Law career ==
Professionally, Ahsan is a barrister at law and a senior advocate of the Supreme Court of Pakistan. He is a senior partner of Aitzaz Ahsan & Associates. Ahsan has represented several high-profile Pakistani personalities including three Prime ministers of Pakistan in various cases such as Nawaz Sharif, Benazir Bhutto and Yousaf Raza Gillani and former President of Pakistan Asif Ali Zardari. He had served as President of Supreme Court Bar Association of Pakistan.

He is known for representing and leading the lawyers campaign to reinstate former Chief Justice of Pakistan Iftikhar Muhammad Chaudhry. In 2008, Ahsan was awarded the Asian Human Rights Defender Award by the Hong Kong-based Asian Human Rights Commission in recognition. Ahsan was arrested following Pakistani state of emergency, 2007. He was under house arrest in his house in Lahore for four months. He was released in March 2008. Ahsan is also a noted human rights activist in Pakistan.

== Books ==
Ahsan is the author of the book The Indus Saga and the Making of Pakistan and its Urdu translation, Sindh Sagar Aur Qyam-e-Pakistan which presents the cultural history of Pakistan and argues that the Indus region is a distinct entity from the rest of India and constitutes a nation.

He has also co-authored the book Divided by Democracy with Lord Meghnad Desai of the London School of Economics.

Political offices
Preceded by Malik Nasim Ahmed Aheer	Interior Minister of Pakistan; 1988–1990	Succeeded by Mian Zahid Sarfraz
