= Khushbakht Shujaat =

Pakistani politician

Member of the Senate of Pakistan
- In office March 2015 – March 2021

Personal details
- Born: 1 November 1948 (age 77) Bhopal, India
- Other political affiliations: Muttahida Qaumi Movement

Khushbakht Shujaat (Urdu: خوش بخت شجاعت; born 1 November 1948) is a Pakistani politician who has been a member of the Senate of Pakistan since March 2015. Previously, she had been a member of the National Assembly of Pakistan from 2008 to 2013.

== Early life and education ==
Shujaat was born on 1 November 1948 in Bhopal, India.

She received Master of Arts degree in Journalism from the University of Karachi between 1972 and 1975.

She worked as anchorperson in Pakistan Television Corporation before entering politics.

== Political career ==
She joined Muttahida Qaumi Movement (MQM) in 2007.

She was elected to the National Assembly of Pakistan from Constituency NA-250 (Karachi-XII) as a candidate of MQM in the 2008 Pakistani general election. She received 52,045 votes and defeated a candidate of Pakistan Peoples Party.

She ran for the seat of National Assembly from Constituency NA-250 (Karachi-XII) as a candidate of MQM in the 2013 Pakistani general election but was unsuccessful. She received 30,365 votes and lost the seat to Arif Alvi.

In 2015, she was elected to the Senate of Pakistan as a candidate of MQM.
