= Presidential Initiative for Artificial Intelligence and Computing (Pakistan) =

Pakistani government campaign to promote study of AI

- Type: Public
- Established: 9 December 2018
- Affiliation: Panacloud Pvt. Ltd
- Location: Pakistan
- Website: https://www.piaic.org

The Presidential Initiative for Artificial Intelligence and Computing (PIAIC) was launched by the President of Pakistan, Dr. Arif Alvi, to promote education, research and business opportunities in Artificial Intelligence, Blockchain, Internet of Things, and Cloud Native Computing. The initiative comes in a bid to enable Pakistan in making an imprint on the world’s path towards the Fourth Industrial Revolution. It aims to transform the fields of education, research, and business in Pakistan. President Dr. Arif Alvi had launched PIAIC.

== Available Programs ==
PIAIC is currently offering following of the technologies:

- Artificial Intelligence
- Cloud Native and Mobile Web Computing
- Blockchain
- Internet of Things(IoT)
- Certified Cloud Applied Generative AI Engineer (GenEng)

== Distance Learning Education ==
PIAIC offers programs for distance learning as well as on-site learning, allowing students from across Pakistan to enroll online. However, students need to be present for exams onsite in order to enroll into the program and for examinations throughout the course of study The program has an initial target to enroll as many as 100,000 students within a year. After a successful launch in Karachi with 12,000 students enrolling, PIAIC have started registering students in other major cities like Islamabad and Faisalabad and soon plan on offering programs in Lahore, Quetta, and Peshawar.

Javaid Laghari has lamented standards of IT education in Pakistan, including the PIAIC, for not being on par with the developed world. He argues that this has led to low IT exports, especially in high-tech services. While praising the PIAIC as a "good start" for "training a large number of coders", he criticises it as providing too little instruction per week and getting poor reviews.

This initiative is a privately funded not-for-profit educational program that has partnership with non-profit and for-profit organizations like Panacloud, Saylani Welfare International Trust, and Pakistan Stock Exchange (PSX)

== Women Inclusion in Technology ==
Women Inclusion in Technology is an initiative of the Women Empowerment Division under the PIAIC. The program aims to increase women’s participation in Pakistan’s technology sector through education, training, and career development.

The initiative focuses on providing women with access to flexible technical education in emerging technologies. According to PIAIC, the program seeks to address the gender gap in the technology industry by increasing awareness, building technical skills, and supporting women in establishing careers as professionals, entrepreneurs, and leaders in the technology sector.

== PIAIC Faculty & Program Leaders ==
=== Zia Ullah Khan ===
Zia is a senior technology leader and the Volunteer Chief Operating Officer of the PIAIC. He is the CEO of Panacloud and has extensive experience in cloud computing, Web 3.0, artificial intelligence, and emerging digital technologies. At PIAIC, he plays a central role in curriculum design, strategic direction, and instruction, and is widely recognized for his contributions to building Pakistan’s future-ready tech workforce.

=== Daniyal Nagori ===
Daniyal is a technology professional and educator associated with PIAIC’s training and instructional activities. He has been involved in teaching, mentoring, and supporting students across PIAIC programs, contributing to the delivery of technical education and the development of practical skills aligned with industry needs.

=== Hira Shoaib ===
she serves as the Director of the Women Empowerment Division at PIAIC. She leads initiatives focused on increasing women’s participation in technology education and creating inclusive learning opportunities across the program. Her work emphasizes outreach, community building, and support systems that encourage women to pursue careers in artificial intelligence, computing, and related fields.

=== Additional Faculty ===
PIAIC’s AI and computing courses also include many instructors across different quarters and subjects — often regional or visiting teachers involved in teaching Python, data science, cloud, AI fundamentals, and more. Some names historically associated with PIAIC teaching teams include:

- Inam Ul Haq
- Dr. Noman Islam
- Anees Ahmed
- Nasir Hussain
- Muhammad Qasim
- Muhammad Hamza Khan
- Fayyaz Farooq
- Komal Aftab
- Waqas Ali Munawar
