= Farooq Sattar =

Pakistani politician

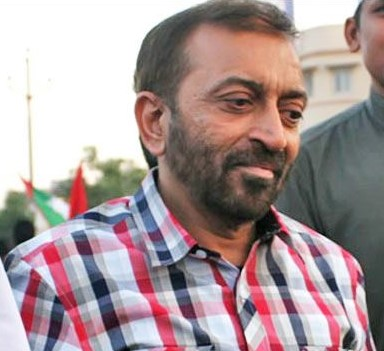

Senior Deputy Convener of the MQM-P
- Incumbent
- Assumed office 2023
- In office 2001–2018

Member of the National Assembly of Pakistan
- Incumbent
- Assumed office 29 February 2024
- Constituency: NA-244 Karachi West-I
- In office 1 June 2013 – 31 May 2018
- Constituency: Constituency NA-249
- In office 16 March 2008 – 15 March 2013
- Constituency: Constituency NA-249
- In office 24 June 2003 – 15 November 2007
- Constituency: Constituency NA-255
- In office 6 November 1990 – 18 July 1993
- Constituency: Constituency NA-249
- In office 2 December 1988 – 6 August 1990
- Constituency: Constituency NA-249

Provincial Minister of Sindh for Local Government
- In office 22 February 1997 – 30 October 1998

Leader of the Opposition in the Provincial Assembly of Sindh
- In office 19 October 1993 – 5 November 1996

Member of the Provincial Assembly of Sindh
- In office 17 February 1997 – 12 October 1999
- In office 19 October 1993 – 5 November 1996

Mayor of Karachi
- In office 9 January 1988 – 27 July 1992
- Preceded by: Abdul Sattar Afghani
- Succeeded by: Naimatullah Khan

Personal details
- Born: Karachi, Sindh, Pakistan
- Party: MQM-P (2016-present)
- Other political affiliations: MQM-L (1986-2016)

Muhammad Farooq Sattar (Urdu: محمد فاروق ستار; born 9 April 1957) is a Pakistani politician who is the Senior Deputy Convenor of the MQM-P.

Born in Karachi, Sattar was educated at the Jinnah Sindh Medical University, Karachi. Sattar began his political career in 1987 as the Mayor of Karachi. In 1993, he served as the Leader of the Opposition in the Provincial Assembly of Sindh and had been a member of the provincial and federal cabinet, in various positions, since 1997. He served as the provincial Minister in Sindh government from 1997 to 1999 and as the Federal Minister for Overseas Pakistanis from 2009 to 2010.

He had been the deputy convener of the MQM as well its parliamentary leader in the National Assembly of Pakistan. He had been a member of the National Assembly of Pakistan and Provincial Assembly of Sindh since 1988, representing Karachi.

== Early life and education ==
Sattar was born on 9 April 1959. He graduated from Jinnah Sindh Medical University, Karachi in 1986.

== Political career ==
Sattar began his political career in 1979 after joining then newly formed student body All Pakistan Muttahidda Students Organization Sattar remained one of its active members until 1986. APMSO later a precursor to Muttahida Qaumi Movement.

In 1987, Sattar, along with former APMSO Chairman and fellow running mate for Deputy Mayor Mateen Yousuf, was elected Mayor of Karachi by the MQM at the age of 28, reportedly, making him the youngest mayor in the world at that time. He served there until 1992.

Sattar was elected as the member of the National Assembly of Pakistan for the first time in the 1988 Pakistani general election on the ticket on MQM from Karachi's south constituency.

Sattar was re-elected as the member of the National Assembly of Pakistan for the second time in the 1990 Pakistani general election on the ticket on MQM from Karachi's south constituency.

Sattar was elected as the member of the Provincial Assembly of Sindh for the first time in the 1993 Pakistani general election on the ticket on MQM from Karachi's south constituency. In 1993, he didn't run for National Assembly seat because MQM boycotted the National Assembly elections. Sattar was appointed by MQM as the Leader of the Opposition in the Provincial Assembly of Sindh.

In 1994, Sattar was arrested after a crackdowns took place against MQM and was reportedly released in 1997.

Sattar was re-elected as the member of the National Assembly of Pakistan for the third time in the 1997 Pakistani general election on the ticket on MQM from Karachi's south constituency. He was also re-elected as the member of the Provincial Assembly of Sindh for the second time in 1997 Pakistani general election on the ticket on MQM from Karachi's south constituency. He vacated his National Assembly seat to retain his winning provincial seat. Sattar was inducted into provincial cabinet and was appointed as the provincial minister.

In 1999, Sattar was arrested over corruption charges soon after the 1999 Pakistani coup d'état in which then Chief of Army Staff, Pervez Musharraf, overthrew elected government of Pakistan. He was released in 2001 after two years in jail. Sattar was facing trial several cases in different session courts in Karachi.

Sattar didn't run for National Assembly seat in the 2002 Pakistani general election for unknown reasons, however, he was nominated by MQM to run in 2002 Pakistan by-elections which were held in 2003 and he was re-elected as the member of the National Assembly of Pakistan for the third time from Karachi's south constituency. The seat became vacant after the death of MNA Mehmood Qureshi.

Sattar was re-elected as the member of the National Assembly of Pakistan for the fourth time in the 2008 Pakistani general election on the ticket on MQM from Karachi's south constituency. Pakistan Peoples Party however alleged that there was rigging in the constituency and accused MQM and Sattar for manipulating the final results. Sattar was inducted into federal cabinet and served as the Federal Minister for overseas Pakistanis from 2008 until his resignation in 2010.

Sattar was re-elected as the member of the National Assembly of Pakistan for the fifth time in the 2013 Pakistani general election on the ticket on MQM from Karachi's south constituency.

Sattar has been the senior deputy convener of the MQM and its parliamentary leader in the National Assembly. In 2008, he was a candidate for Prime Minister of Pakistan. He also served as chairman of the foreign affairs committee in the National Assembly during Pervez Musharraf's rule.

=== MQM Pakistan ===
In 2016, Sattar was charged for listening to, organizing, and facilitating a speech by Altaf Hussain in which Altaf Hussain had said: "Pakistan Murdabad" ('Death to Pakistan').

In August 2016, after the MQM workers attacked on ARY Digital office in Karachi on the call of Altaf Hussain, Sattar was taken into custody by Sindh Rangers while he was trying to address the media in connection to the attack on ARY News office. He was released in few hours. An Anti-Terrorism Court in Pakistan issued a non-bailable arrest warrant for Sattar for hate speech case.

Later, Sattar disassociated with London-based leader of MQM Altaf Hussain saying that MQM will only operate from within Pakistan. He changed the constitution of MQM to incorporate himself as the new chief saying that "MQM is Pakistan. The MQM is registered in Pakistan and recognises the laws and Constitution of Pakistan. The party should operate from Pakistan alone." Dawn reported that MQM was registered with the Election Commission of Pakistan (ECP) in the name of Sattar. Sattar appointed himself as the convener of the coordination committee of MQM.

Following which MQM's London-based leadership expelled Sattar from the party for betraying and asked him to resign from National Assembly which he won on MQM ticket and re-contest the elections afresh. However, Sattar and parliamentarians part of his faction didn't resign from their respective parliaments.

In February 2017, an Anti-Terrorism Court in Pakistan instructed the authorities to put the name of Sattar on the Exit Control List, after Sattar was charged with facilitation of hate speech but police failed to produce the Sattar in court hearings. In March 2017, he was briefly arrested on charges of hate speech case and was released later.

In November 2017, Sattar announced Muttahida Quami Movement Pakistan would make a political alliance with Pak Sarzameen Party (PSP). A day later, he announced his resignation from the party and politics. However, he later retracted his resignation after his mother urged him to stay in politics.

In February 2018, he was removed by the Rabita Committee from the convenership position of MQM. The same day, he dissolved the Rabita Committee and called for fresh intra-party election to elect new leader of the party. In March 2018, The ECP removed him as the convener of the MQM. A few days later, Islamabad High Court (IHC) suspended the decision of the ECP and reinstated Sattar as convener of the MQM. In June 2018, IHC removed Sattar as MQM-P convener. On 9 November 2018, for violating party discipline, his basic membership of MQM-P was revoked.
