= PS-109 Karachi South-IV =

Constituency of the Provincial Assembly of Sindh, Pakistan

- Constituency for the Provincial Assembly of Sindh
- Region: Clifton Cantonment (partly) including Clifton, Civil Lines, Garden town (partly), Arambagh of Saddar Town and Karachi Cantonment (partly) of Karachi South District in Karachi
- Electorate: 222,977

Current constituency
- Member: Vacant
- Created from: PS-112 Karachi-XXIV (2002–2018); PS-110 Karachi South-IV (2018–2023)

PS-109 Karachi South-IV (پی ایس-۱۰۹، کراچی جنوبی-۴) is a constituency of the Provincial Assembly of Sindh.

== General elections 2024 ==
Provincial election 2024: PS-109 Karachi South-IV
Party	Candidate	Votes	%	±%
Independent	Bilal Hussain Khan Jadoon (Note: Filed nomination papers as PTI candidate but ECP allowed him to run as an Independent)	27,856	40.46	
JI	Muhammad Ziker Mahenti	12,825	18.63	
TLP	Muhammad Ahmed Raza	10,047	14.59	
PPP	Abdul Razzaq Sangani	7,158	10.40	
MQM-P	Iftikhar Ali Kaimkhani	6,500	9.44	
Independent	Erum Anis	1,311	1.90	
PML(N)	Mehmood Hussain	1,259	1.83	
Others	Others (twenty six candidates)	1,890	2.75	
Turnout		69,626	31.23	
Total valid votes		68,846	98.88	
Rejected ballots		780	1.12	
Majority		15,031	21.83	
Registered electors		222,977		
PTI gain from PPP				

== General elections 2018 ==
General election 2018: PS-110 Karachi South-IV
Party	Candidate	Votes	%	±%
PTI	Khurrum Sher Zaman	38,884	41.46	
PPP	Syed Najmi Alam	14,049	14.98	
MQM-P	Syed Adil Askari	11,951	12.74	
TLP	Muhammad Rashid	11,165	11.91	
MMA	Abdul Qadir	6,692	7.14	
PML(N)	Muhammad Waseem Vohra	4,473	4.77	
PSP	Muhammad Sharif Awan	3,795	4.05	
ANP	Abdul Qayum	1,291	1.38	
Independent	Wasif Chaman	400	0.43	
PRHP	Muhammad Mateen	263	0.28	
Independent	Syed Farhan Ahmed	239	0.25	
Independent	Aman Ullah	195	0.21	
Independent	Muhammad Ayaz	147	0.16	
GDA	Huma Bano	61	0.07	
Independent	Imran Rasheed	43	0.05	
Independent	Aftab Hussain Lakho	37	0.04	
Independent	Adnan Jamil	29	0.03	
PJDP	Muhammad Asif Qureshi	21	0.02	
Independent	Saifullah Khan	18	0.02	
Independent	Muhammad Azam Khan	18	0.02	
Independent	Muhammad Iqbal Kashmiri	11	0.01	
Total valid votes		93,782		
Rejected ballots		1,398		
Registered electors		236,685		

== General elections 2013 ==
Contesting candidates	Party affiliation	Votes polled

== General elections 2008 ==
Contesting candidates	Party affiliation	Votes polled

== See also ==
- PS-109 Karachi South-III
- PS-110 Karachi South-V
