= Bilal Hussain Khan Jadoon =

Pakistani politician

Bilal Hussain Khan Jadoon is a Pakistani politician who has been a Member of the Provincial Assembly of Sindh since 2024.

== Political career ==
He was elected to the 16th Provincial Assembly of Sindh as a Pakistan Tehreek-e-Insaf-backed independent candidate from Constituency PS-109 Karachi South-IV in the 2024 Pakistani general election.
