= OIC Science and Technology Summit =

2017 summit in Kazakhstan

First OIC Summit on Science and Technology
Date September 10, 2017
Country Kazakhstan
City Astana, Republic of Kazakhstan
Participants participation of 56 OIC member countries, international and regional organizations
Official web-site Outcome documents on OIC website

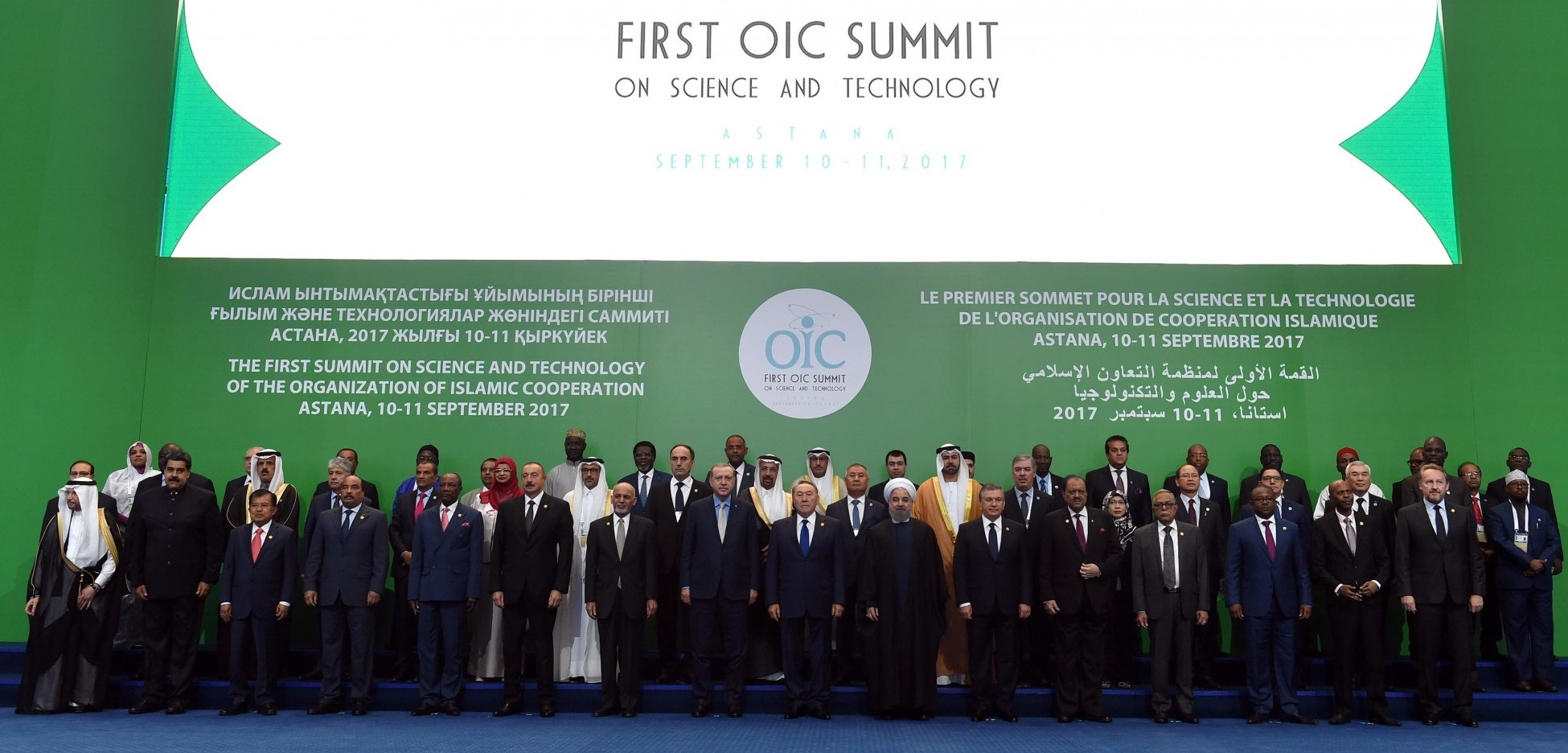
Joint photo of Heads of delegations

First Summit of the Organization of Islamic Cooperation on Science and Technology The first OIC Summit took place on September 10–11, 2017 under the slogan "Science, Technology, Innovation and Modernization in the Islamic World" and was coincided with the closure of The International specialized exhibition Expo 2017.

== Background ==
The summit was held in the Palace of Independence (Astana).

== Initiative ==
President of Kazakhstan Nursultan Nazarbayev for the first time announced this initiative during his speech at the OIC Summit in Istanbul on April 14–15, 2016.

== The goals of the Summit ==
Convening of the Summit at the level of heads of state and government is aimed at developing cooperation between the member states of the Organization in the fields of science, technology, innovation and modernization, including active involvement with the experience of the advanced world. The Summit consisted of four working sessions on the following topics: "The growing influence of science on society’s life in the 21st century," "The role of science and technology in ensuring sustainable development," "Competition and innovation in the modern economy," and "Development of cooperation in science and technology."

== The participants ==
The Summit was attended by 56 OIC member countries, including the heads of state of Azerbaijan, Turkey, Iran, Saudi Arabia, Pakistan, Bangladesh,Uzbekistan and representatives of international and regional organizations.

== Results ==
The Summit adopted the Astana Declaration, which is designed to provide political support for scientific and technological modernization in the Islamic world. The ceremony of awarding the OIC Prize to outstanding scientists who contributed to the development of science and technology tool place during the event. At the initiative of the Turkish delegation, there had been prepared a final report on the issue of Rohingya Muslims of Myanmar.
