= Samar Ali Khan =

Pakistani politician

Member of the Provincial Assembly of Sindh
- In office 29 May 2013 – 28 May 2018

Personal details
- Born: 11 July 1955 (age 70) Murree, Punjab, Pakistan
- Other political affiliations: PTI (2013-2018)

Samar Ali Khan (born 11 July 1955) is a Pakistani politician who was a Member of the Provincial Assembly of Sindh from May 2013 to May 2018. He is married to Atiqa Odho.

== Early life and education ==
He was born on 11 July 1955 in Murree.

He has a degree of Bachelor of Architecture from University of Houston.

== Political career ==
He was elected to the Provincial Assembly of Sindh as a candidate of Pakistan Tehreek-e-Insaf from Constituency PS-113 Karachi-XXV in the 2013 Pakistani general election.

In May 2018, he announced the end of his political career.
