= Saleem Zia =

Pakistani politician

Member of the Senate of Pakistan
- In office March 2015 – March 2021

Personal details
- Party: PMLN

Saleem Zia (Urdu: سلیم ضیا) is a Pakistani politician who is currently a member of Senate of Pakistan, representing Pakistan Muslim League (N).

== Political career ==
He was elected to the Senate of Pakistan as a candidate of Pakistan Muslim League (N) in 2015 Pakistani Senate election.
