= Cantonment Public School, Karachi =

Location
- Frere Street; Karachi Cantonment; Karachi; Pakistan
- Coordinates: 24.85472°N 67.04348°E

Information
- Motto: Carve thy destiny and know thyself
- Established: 1958
- Founder: Khawaja Saghir Ali
- Gender: Boys (grades KG-10); Co-educational (until the late 1960s)
- Age range: 4-16
- Language: English
- Hours in school day: 8 Hours
- Campus type: Urban
- Houses: Wahaj, Babar
- Colours: Steel grey/white/claret logo/blue base and yellow striped tie
- Sports: Football, cricket, field hockey, volleyball, table tennis, badminton, handball
- Publication: Clarion, Souvenir, Sareer
- Alumni: oldpublicans.com
- Board of education: Naval Education Board, Karachi
- Name change: Federal Government Public School in 1976

Cantonment Public School (Urdu: کینٹونمنٹ پبلک اسکول ), shortened to 'Cantt Public School', was a fee paying school located in Karachi, Pakistan. It catered for primary and secondary level education (up to matriculation or secondary school certificate) for the children of Armed Forces personnel stationed in Karachi Cantonment, primarily, but also open to civilians, in limited numbers, as well. The school motto was "Crave thy destiny and know thyself".

== Campus location ==
The school was located in the old center of Karachi at Frere Street, near Saddar, adjacent to the Karachi Cantonment Railway Station and to the Red Cross, Pakistan, offices.

== History ==
The school was founded in 1958 with Mr Khawaja Saghir Ali as its first principal. The school carried on until 1976 under the name of Cantt Public School, Karachi and afterwards as Federal Government Public School, Karachi Cantt. Although still going, the school no longer boasts its original buildings at Frere Street.

== Sports ==
The school had nine cricket fields, which was the most of any school in Karachi, and educated many cricketers, including Wasim Bari. The School also played an important role in the popularization of field hockey in Pakistan.
