= Khurrum Sher Zaman =

Pakistani politician

Member of the Provincial Assembly of Sindh
- In office 13 August 2018 – 11 August 2023
- Constituency: PS-110 Karachi South-IV
- In office 29 May 2013 – 28 May 2018
- Constituency: PS-112 Karachi-XXIV

President of PTI Karachi Division
- Incumbent
- Assumed office 31 July 2023
- Chairman: Imran Khan; Gohar Ali Khan
- Preceded by: Akram Cheema

Personal details
- Born: Karachi, Sindh, Pakistan
- Party: PTI (2013-present)

Khurrum Sher Zaman is a Pakistani politician who had been a member of the Provincial Assembly of Sindh from August 2018 to August 2023. He was previously a member of the Provincial Assembly of Sindh from May 2013 to May 2018.

== Early life and education ==
He was born on 22 December 1974 in Karachi.

He claimed to have received intermediate education.

He is a businessman and owns a food restaurant in Saddar, Karachi.

== Political career ==
He was elected to the Provincial Assembly of Sindh as a candidate of Pakistan Tehreek-e-Insaf (PTI) from Constituency PS-112 Karachi-XXIV in the 2013 Pakistani general election.

He was re-elected to Provincial Assembly of Sindh as a candidate of PTI from Constituency PS-110 (Karachi South-IV) in the 2018 Pakistani general election.
