= Arif Alvi =

President of Pakistan from 2018 to 2024

- عارف علوی
- Alvi in 2019

13th President of Pakistan
- In office 9 September 2018 – 10 March 2024
- Prime Minister: Imran Khan; Shehbaz Sharif; Anwaar ul Haq
- Preceded by: Mamnoon Hussain
- Succeeded by: Asif Ali Zardari

Member of the National Assembly
- In office 13 August 2018 – 6 September 2018
- Preceded by: Imran Khan
- Succeeded by: Aftab Siddiqui
- Constituency: NA-241 Karachi South-III
- In office 1 June 2013 – 31 May 2018
- Preceded by: Khushbakht Shujaat
- Succeeded by: Arif Alvi
- Constituency: NA-241 Karachi South-III

Personal details
- Born: 29 July 1949 (age 77) Karachi, Federal Capital Territory, Dominion of Pakistan
- Party: PTI (1996–present)
- Other political affiliations: JIP (1979–1988)
- Spouse: Samina Alvi
- Children: 4
- Education: De'Montmorency College (BS); University of Michigan (MS); University of the Pacific (MS)
- Occupation: Politician; Dentist

Arif-ur-Rehman Alvi (Note: Urdu: عارف الرحمٰن علوی) (born 29 July 1949) is a Pakistani politician and former dentist who served as the 13th president of Pakistan from September 2018 to March 2024. He was a member of the National Assembly from 2013 until being elected president in 2018. Alvi entered politics in 1979 by joining Jamaat-e-Islami, but later resigned and became one of the founding members of the Pakistan Tehreek-e-Insaf.

Alvi was elected to the National Assembly, from NA-250 Karachi-XII in 2013 and was re-elected in 2018 from NA-247 Karachi South-II. He was later nominated as the PTI's candidate for the presidential election. He was elected as the 13th President of Pakistan after defeating Fazal-ur-Rehman and Aitzaz Ahsan, after which he resigned from the National Assembly and was sworn into office on 9 September 2018, succeeding former President Mamnoon Hussain.

== Early life and education ==
Arif Alvi was born on 29 July 1949. His father, Habib-ur-Rehman Elahi Alvi, was also a dentist, in Lucknow, British India who migrated to Karachi after the establishment of Pakistan, and opened a dental clinic in Saddar Town. His father became politically affiliated with Jamaat-e-Islami Pakistan. According to the PTI website, Alvi's father was a dentist of Jawaharlal Nehru.

After his father started a campaign against compulsory catechism, Alvi was then expelled from the Anglican Karachi Grammar School. He completed his early education in Karachi, and moved to Lahore in 1967 for education in dentistry. Alvi received a Bachelor of Dental Surgery degree from De'Montmorency College of Dentistry. He completed his master's degree in prosthodontics from the University of Michigan in 1975. Alvi received a master's degree in orthodontics in 1984 from the University of the Pacific in San Francisco, California. After returning to Pakistan, he started practicing dentistry and set up Alvi Dental Hospital.

== Professional career ==
In 1981, Alvi was Chairman of the first Pakistan International Dental Conference. In 1987, he became Chairman of the Third Pakistan International Dental Conference. He became Patron of the Fifth Pakistan International Dental Conference. In 1997, Alvi became a Diplomate of the American Board of Orthodontics. He prepared the constitution of the Pakistan Dental Association and went on to become its president. He also served as Chairman of the 28th Asia Pacific Dental Congress.

He served as Dean of the Faculty of Orthodontics of the College of Physicians and Surgeons Pakistan. In 2006, he was elected as the President of Asia Pacific Dental Federation. The next year, he was elected as a Councillor of the FDI World Dental Federation.

== Political career ==
Alvi began his political career as a polling agent and joined a religious party.

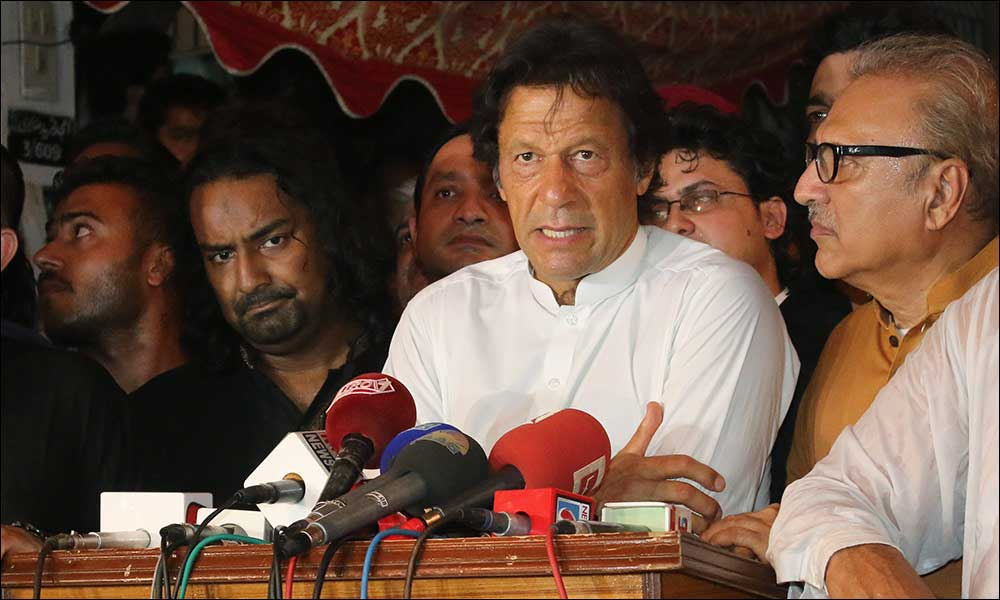
With Imran Khan in 2018 during the PTI's election campaigning process

While studying at De'Montmorency College of Dentistry, he became an active member of the student unions. He became politically affiliated with Islami Jamiat Talaba, a student wing of Jamaat-e-Islami Pakistan (JI) and went on to become president of the student union. In an interview, he told that during his early days, he was a critic of the Ayub Khan regime and was shot twice while participating in a protest in 1969 at The Mall, Lahore; a bullet still remains lodged in his body.

He became politically active after Zulfikar Ali Bhutto announced the 1977 Pakistani general election.

He ran for a seat on the Provincial Assembly of Sindh as a candidate of the JI from a constituency in Karachi in 1979 but was unsuccessful. In 1988, he quit JI and left politics. According to Alvi, he left the party because he had become disillusioned with their narrow focus on politics and had "always felt honest leadership is the real solution to Pakistan’s problems".

After getting inspired by Imran Khan, he joined Pakistan Tehreek-e-Insaf in 1996 and became one of the founding members of the party. He participated in preparing the party constitution of PTI.

He remained a member of the PTI central executive council for a year before becoming president of PTI's Sindh chapter in 1997.

Alvi ran for the seat of the Provincial Assembly of Sindh as a candidate of PTI from Constituency PS-89 (Karachi South-V) in the 1997 Pakistani general election, but was unsuccessful. He came in third receiving 2,200 votes and lost the seat to Saleem Zia.

In 2001, he became the vice president of PTI.

He ran for the seat of the Provincial Assembly of Sindh as a candidate of PTI from Constituency PS-90 (Karachi-II) in the 2002 Pakistani general election, but was unsuccessful. He came in at sixth place securing 1,276 votes and lost the seat to Umer Sadiq, a candidate of the Muttahida Majlis-e-Amal (MMA).

In 2006, he became secretary general of PTI, a position he served in until 2013.

He was elected to the National Assembly of Pakistan as a candidate of PTI from Constituency NA-250 (Karachi-XII) in the 2013 Pakistani general election. He received 77,659 votes and defeated Khushbakht Shujaat. Upon his successful election, he became the only PTI member to win a National Assembly seat from Sindh in the 2013 general elections.

During the 2014 Tsunami March, police invoked the Anti-Terrorism Act against Alvi and several other PTI leaders for allegedly inciting violence. He was implicated in cases stemming from the 2014 attacks on Parliament House and Pakistan Television Corporation (PTV). On one occasion, Alvi and other PTI leaders went to the police station and forcibly secured the release of a PTI lawmaker from jail and were also accused of assaulting the policemen present. In 2018, The Anti-Terrorism Court (ATC) granted pre-arrest bail to PTI leaders, including Alvi, in cases related to the 2014 attack on Parliament House and PTV.

In 2016, he was made president of the PTI Sindh chapter.

He was re-elected to the National Assembly as a candidate of PTI from Constituency NA-247 (Karachi South-II) in the 2018 Pakistani general election. He received 91,020 votes and defeated Syed Zaman Ali Jaffery, a candidate of Tehreek-e-Labbaik Pakistan.

== Presidency (2018–2024) ==
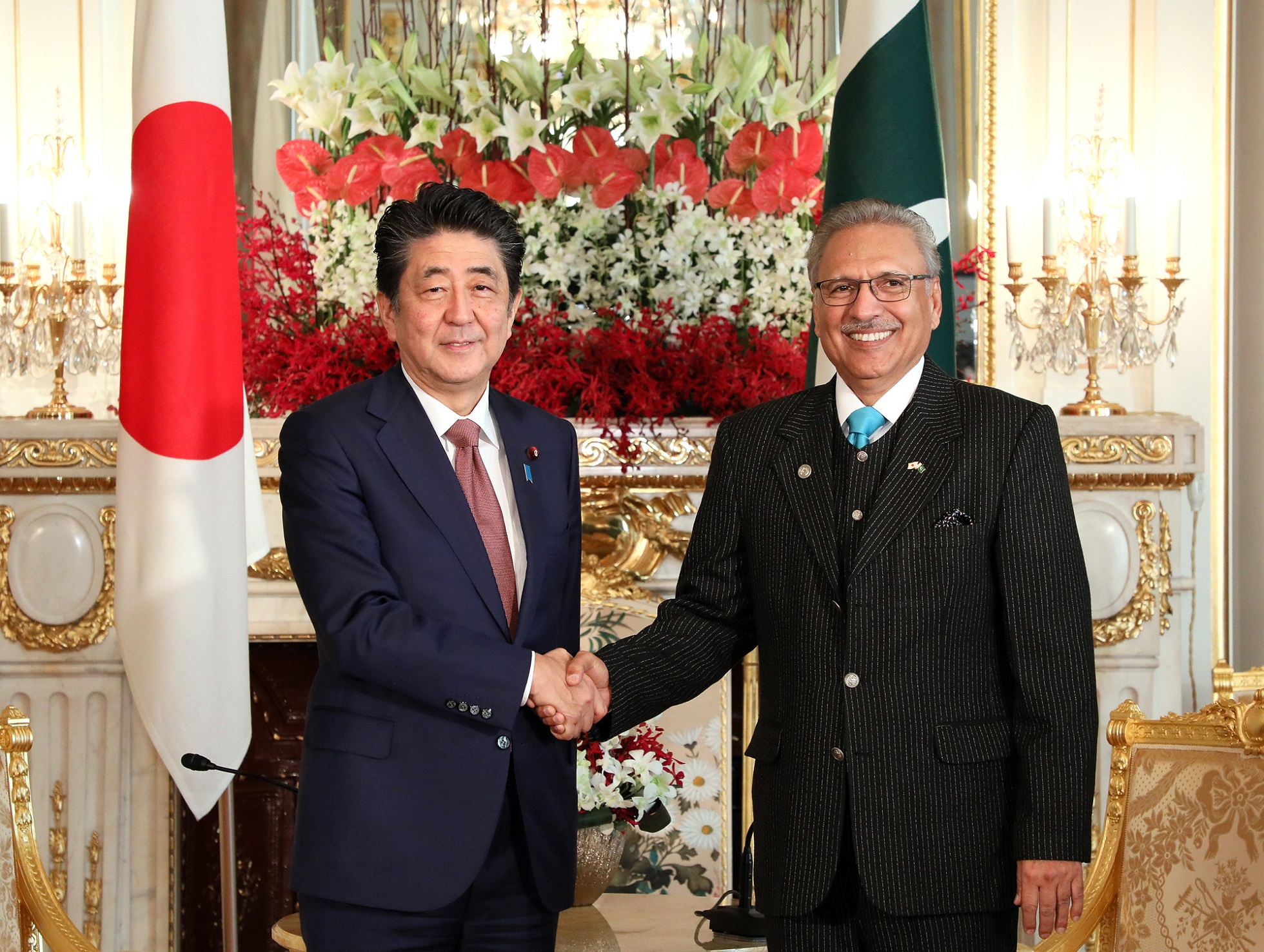
With Japanese Prime Minister Shinzo Abe during the enthronement ceremony of Emperor Naruhito, October 2019

On 18 August 2018, he was nominated by PTI as its candidate for the office of President of Pakistan. On 4 September 2018, he was elected as 13th President of Pakistan in the 2018 Pakistani presidential election. He received 352 electoral votes and defeated Fazal-ur-Rehman and Aitzaz Ahsan who secured 184 and 124 votes, respectively. Upon getting elected as the President, Alvi thanked Prime Minister Imran Khan, and the government coalition for their support. He became the third President of Pakistan whose family migrated to Pakistan from India after the Partition of India. On 5 September 2018, he relinquished his National Assembly seat. On 9 September, he replaced Mamnoon Hussain and was sworn in as 13th President of Pakistan. On 17 September, he addressed the National Assembly for the first time in his capacity as president.

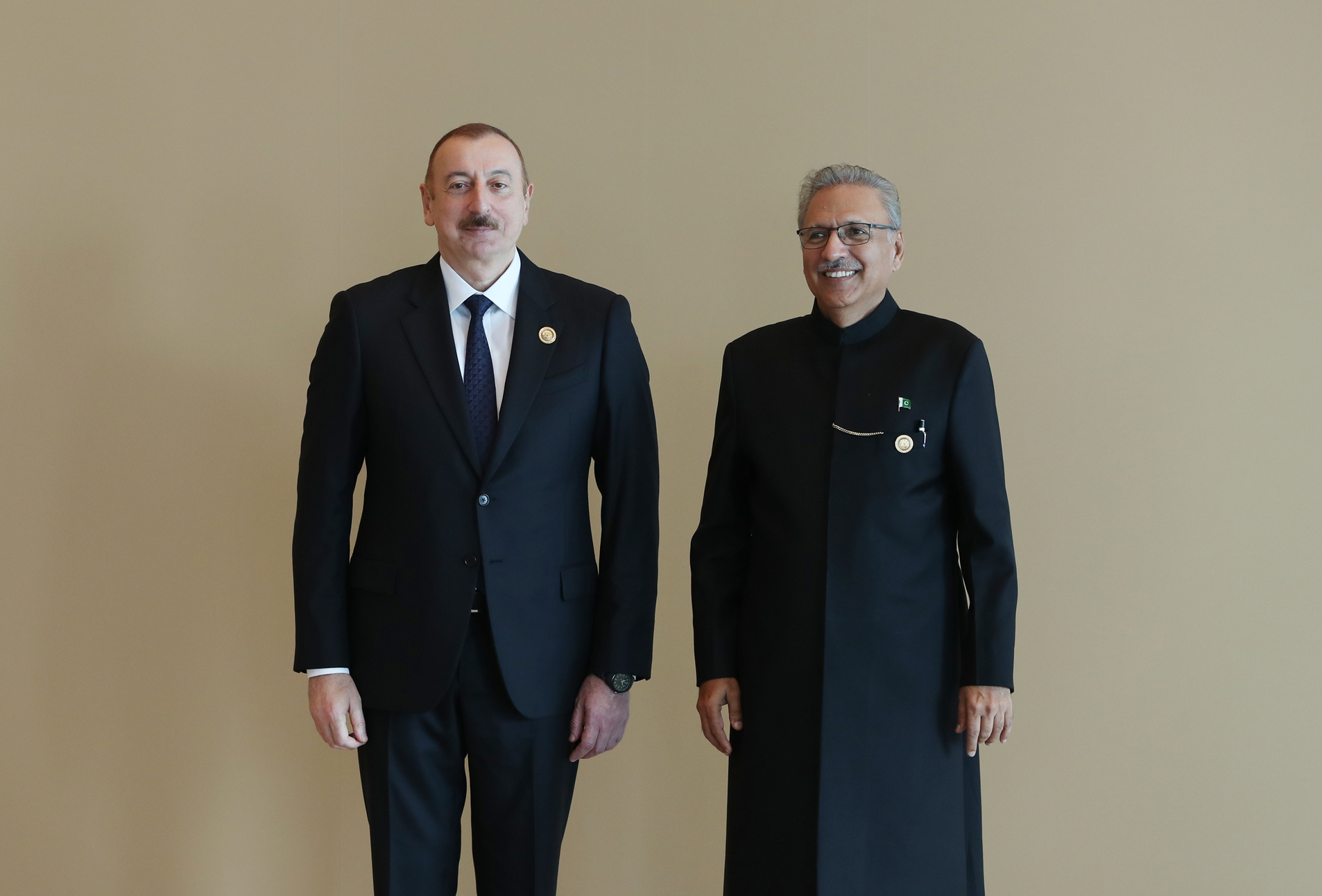
With Azerbaijani President Ilham Aliyev during the 18th Summit of the Non-Aligned Movement, October 2019

In 2018, he started the Presidential Initiative for Artificial Intelligence & Computing (PIAIC).

On 8 September 2023, Alvi marked the conclusion of his five-year term as the country's fourth democratically elected president. However, he continued in office beyond this date due to the absence of an electoral college required to elect his successor. This made him the second President in the country's history to have an extended term.

His term as President of Pakistan ended on 8 March 2024.

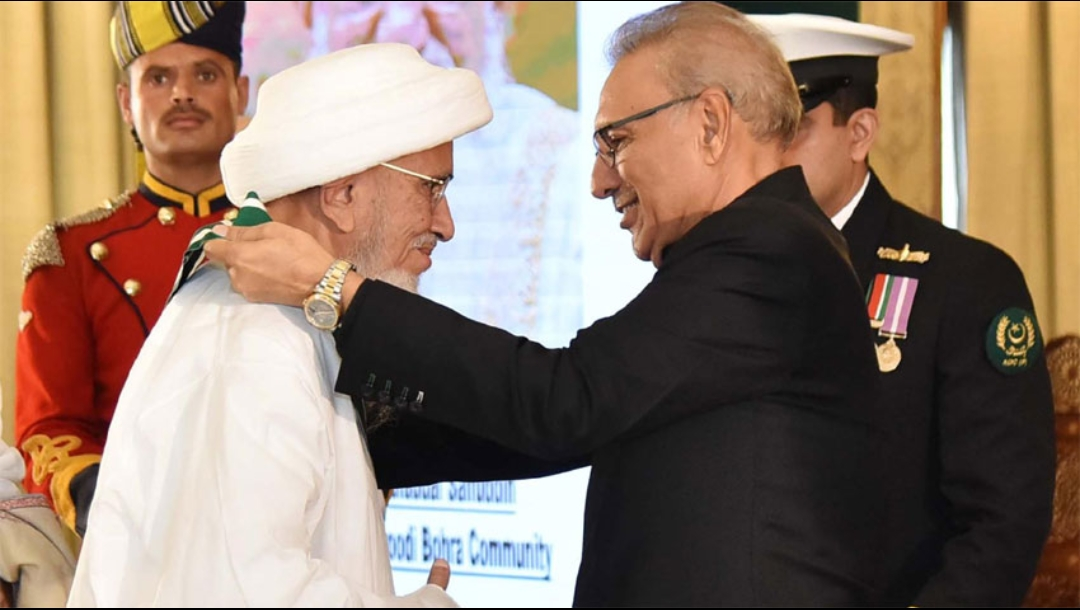
Conferring the Nishan-e-Pakistan on Mufaddal Saifuddin, December 2023

On 3 April 2022, he dissolved the National Assembly of Pakistan on the advice of Prime Minister Imran Khan, in order to prevent the moving of the scheduled no-confidence motion that intended to remove Khan from the office of PM. The dissolution was appealed to the Supreme Court of Pakistan, which declared the move unconstitutional and restored the National Assembly on 7 April, which then proceeded to carry out the no-confidence motion on the night of 9 April. The motion was successful after 174 MNAs voted in its favour (172 were needed), thus ending Imran Khan's term as prime minister. Alvi was criticized for this move and the Supreme Court also declared Alvi's decision "contrary to the Constitution and the law and of no legal effect".

In April 2022, President Alvi faced criticism for missing the oath-taking ceremony of Prime Minister Shehbaz Sharif due to illness. Some accused him of showing bias towards the PTI instead of fulfilling his duties impartially according to the Constitution.

In August 2023, Arif Alvi declined to sign into law two bills, the Official Secrets Amendment Bill 2023 and the Pakistan Army Amendment Bill 2023. However, in a surprising disclosure, Alvi later revealed that he withheld his signature on these bills due to his disagreement with their provisions. He further asserted that his staff at the President House had acted against his directives, undermining his authority. This caused controversy because, according to the Constitution, Alvi should have either approved or rejected the bills within ten days. But the bills were confirmed later without his clear decision.

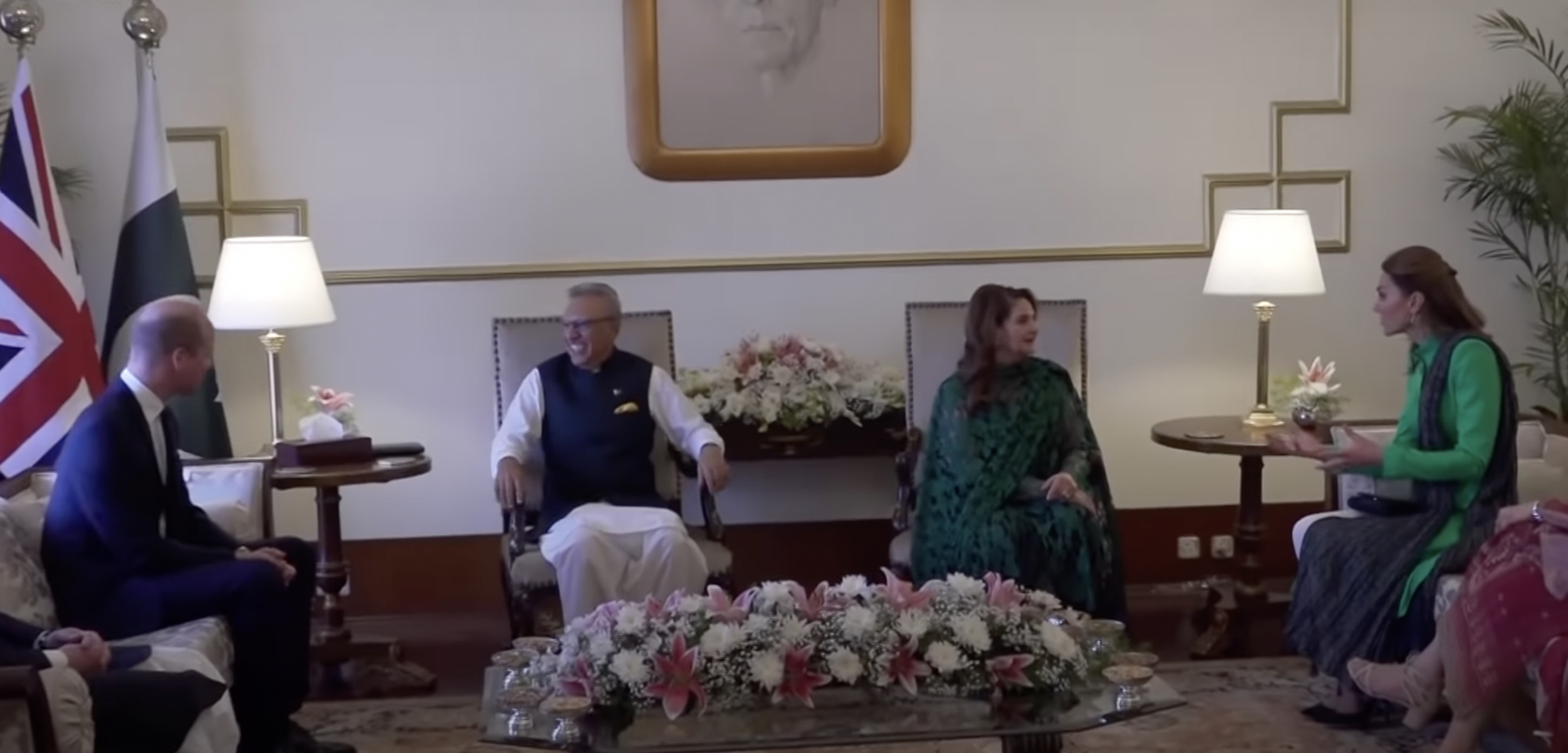
With Prince William and Princess Kate at the Aiwan-e-Sadr, October 2019

In March 2024, Alvi faced criticism for violating the Constitution when he delayed summoning a session of the National Assembly for newly elected MNAs to take oath following the 2024 Pakistani general election. He waited until the last moment to do so after twice rejecting summaries from the caretaker prime minister, citing concerns over the allocation of reserved seats to PTI.

The Friday Times wrote that Alvi's presidency was marked by a troubled legacy riddled with controversies and disputes with elected governments and state institutions. He was often viewed as a president who closely aligned himself with his party, the PTI, rather than serving as a unifying figure for the nation. The News in its editorial wrote that despite criticism from legal experts, the judiciary, and political opponents, Alvi's presidency faced allegations of prioritizing party interests over national concerns. These factors may shape how history perceives his time in office.

== Personal life ==
Alvi is married to Samina Alvi. The couple has four married children.

Alvi is an avid reader, with subjects of interest including quantum physics, the fourth industrial revolution, artificial intelligence, blockchain and cloud computing, while in terms of intellectual influences he considers his mentors to be Plato, Karl Marx, Mawdudi and Thomas Piketty.

== See also ==
- List of presidents of Pakistan
- Constitution of Pakistan
