= Masoud =

- Gender: Male

Origin
- Origin: Arabia
- Meaning: "fortunate", "prosperous", "happy" or "to make others happy"
- Region of origin: Muslim world

Other names
- Related names: Masud, Massoud, Massoude, Massudeh, Masood, Masʽud, Mashud, Messaoud, Mesut, Mesud, Mosād, Massood

Masoud (Arabic: مسعود, lit. 'fortune, happy, prosperous, lucky') is a male given name and surname, originating from Arabic. The name is found in the Arab world, Iran, Turkey, Tajikistan, Afghanistan, Uzbekistan, Pakistan, Russia, Bangladesh, Malaysia, and China. Masoud has spelling variations possibly due to transliteration, including Masud, Massoud, Massoude, Massudeh, Masood, Masʽud, Mashud, Messaoud, Mesut, Mesud, Massood, or Mosād.

Notable people and characters with the name include:

== Given name ==
=== Masoud ===
- Masoud (musician), Iranian music producer, artist, and DJ
- Masoud Kazerouni, 14th-century Persian physician
- Masoud Barzani, President of the Iraqi Kurdistan region from 2005 to 2017
- Masoud Juma, Kenyan footballer
- Masoud Shojaei, Iranian footballer
- Masoud Bastani, Iranian journalist

=== Mas'ud ===
- Masʽud I of Ghazni, sultan of the Ghaznavid Empire from 1030 to 1040
- Masʽud Hai Rakkaḥ, Chief rabbi of Tripoli

=== Masood ===
- Masood Abbas, Pakistani politician
- Masood Abdulah (born 1993), English professional boxer
- Masood Ahmad, Indian politician from Uttar Pradesh
- Masood Ahmad Azizi, Afghan politician and diplomat
- Masood Ahmed (economist), Pakistan-born British economist
- Masood Ahmed Barkati (1933–2017), Pakistani writer and editor
- Masood Ahmed Janjua, Pakistani businessman who disappeared in 2005
- Masood Ahmed Khan (1918–?), Pakistani Olympic field hockey player
- Masood Akhtar (cricketer) (born 1946), Pakistani-American cricketer who played for the United States national team
- Masood Akhtar (actor) (1940–1922), Pakistani actor
- Masood Akhtar (politician), Indian politician from Uttar Pradesh
- Masood Ali Khan (born 1947), Indian scholar, historian and a writer on Islamic history, culture, and religion
- Masood Ali Khan (politician), Pakistani politician from Balochistan
- Masood Anwar (born 1967), Pakistani Test cricketer
- Masood Ashar (1931–2021), Pakistani Urdu short story writer, novelist, journalist, columnist and translator
- Masood Ashraf Raja, Pakistani-born American writer
- Masood Aslam (born 1952), Pakistan Army general
- Masood Azhar (born 1968), Pakistani radical Islamist and terrorist
- Masood Dakik (born 1967), Afghan-German entrepreneur and lobbyist
- Masood Fakhri (1932–2016), Pakistani international footballer
- Masood Helali, Bangladeshi politician
- Masood Iqbal (1952–2003), Pakistani cricketer
- Masood Jan, Pakistani blind cricketer
- Masood Kamandy (born 1981), American artist
- Masood Kausar, Pakistani politician, 28th Governor of Khyber Pakhtunkhwa
- Masood Khadarpoosh (1916–1985), Pakistani bureaucrat, activist, agricultural reformist and a champion of the Punjabi language
- Masood Khan, Pakistani-Kashmiri diplomat, 27th President of Azad Kashmir
- Masood Madani (born 1967), Indian politician from Uttarakhand
- Masood Mufti (1934–2020), Pakistani scholar of Urdu language, short story writer, novelist, dramatist, columnist and civil servant
- Masood Parvez (1918–2001), Pakistani film director
- Masood Rana (1941–1995), Pakistani film playback singer
- Masood Salahuddin (1915–2006), Pakistani cricket umpire
- Masood Shafqat, Pakistani politician from the Punjab
- Masood Shahrukh Khan (born 1995), known as Shahrukh Khan, Indian cricketer
- Masood Sharif Khan Khattak (1950–2023), Pakistani politician, civilian intelligence officer and the first Director General of the Intelligence Bureau
- Masood-ul-Hasan (born 1945), Pakistani cricketer
- Masood ul-Mulk, Pakistani expert on humanitarian aid and a development practitioner
- Masood ur Rehman Usmani (1968–2024), Pakistani Islamic scholar and religious leader

=== Other variations of spellings ===
- Mesud Pezer, Bosnian Olympic shot putter
- Messaoud Bellemou, Algerian musician
- Messaoud Ould Boulkheir, Mauritanian politician
- Moshood K. O. Abiola, politician and philanthropist from Nigeria
- Mesut of Menteşe (died 1319), Turkish bey
- Mesut Bakkal (born 1964), Turkish football manager
- Mesut Cemil (1902–1963), Turkish composer and musician
- Mesut Doğan (born 1982), Turkish Austrian futsal player
- Mesut İktu (born 1947), Turkish voice musician
- Mesut Mert (born 1978), Bulgarian football player
- Mesut Özil (born 1988), German football player
- Mesut Yılmaz (1947–2020), Turkish politician

== Surname ==
=== Masoud ===
- Moez Masoud, Egyptian Muslim cleric

=== Masood ===
- Shan Masood, Pakistani cricketer
- Syed M. Masood, Pakistani-American author
- Tariq Masood, Pakistani Islamic scholar

=== Other variations of spellings ===
- Rükneddin Mesud, King Mesud I
- Mohamed Messaoud, Algerian footballer

== Fictional characters ==
- Masud Rana, in the Bengali spy thriller series of the same name
- Masood Ahmed, fictional character in EastEnders, and his family, including:
  - Zainab Masood
  - Syed Masood
  - Amira Masood
  - Shabnam Masood
  - Tamwar Masood
  - Afia Masood
  - Kamil Masood
  - Yasmin Masood
