= Mann Mayal =

2016 Pakistani romantic television series

- Series Poster
- Genre: Drama; Romance
- Created by: Momina Duraid; Sana Shahnawaz
- Written by: Samira Fazal
- Directed by: Haseeb Hassan
- Starring: Hamza Ali Abbasi; Maya Ali; Gohar Rasheed; Ayesha Khan; Aiman Khan
- Opening theme: "Tere Naal Mein Laiyan Akhiyan" by Quratulain Balouch and Shuja Haider
- Ending theme: "Tere Naal Mein Laiyan Akhiyan" by Quratulain Balouch and Shuja Haider
- Composer: MAD Music
- Country of origin: Pakistan
- Original language: Urdu
- No. of episodes: 33 (list of episodes)

Production
- Producers: Momina Duraid; Samina Humayun Saeed; Sana Shahnawaz; Tariq Shah
- Production locations: Hyderabad; Karachi
- Cinematography: Zeb Rao
- Editor: Mahmood Ali
- Camera setup: Multi-camera setup
- Running time: 35–43 minutes
- Production companies: MD Productions; Next Level Entertainment

Original release
- Network: Hum TV
- Release: 25 January – 5 September 2016

Mann Mayal (Urdu: من مائل, lit. 'Heart inclined') is a Pakistani romantic drama television series that originally aired on Hum TV on 25 January 2016 to 5 September 2016, and was digitally released on Amazon Prime and Iflix. It is co-produced by Momina Duraid of MD Productions and Samina Humayun Saeed of Next Level Entertainment, written by Samira Fazal and directed by Haseeb Hassan. Mann Mayal starred Hamza Ali Abbasi as Salahhudin and Maya Ali as Manahil in leading roles.

The series chronicles the lives of Manahil and Salahuddin. They fall in love with each other but cannot meet due to the differences in their social class.

Mann Mayal received largely negative reviews, with critics praising Abbasi's performance and the soundtrack, but intensely criticising the script for clichéd plot, poor portrayal of women, and perpetuation of harmful norms. Despite this, the series was 2016's highest rated drama serial in Pakistan. At the 16th Lux Style Awards, it won two awards out of five nominations.

== Premise ==
Manahil (Maya Ali) lives in a joint family in Hyderabad. Her neighbour, Salahuddin (Hamza Ali Abbasi) is an ambitious and intelligent man. Manahil's father asks Salahuddin to tutor Manahil seeing her low grades in college. Manahil and Salahuddin fall in love with each other. Still, Salahuddin doesn't marry Manahil due to differences in their social-class status and fear of rejection from her family. Manahil's parents accept Mikaeel's (Gohar Rasheed) wedding proposal, who, unbeknownst to Manahil's family, is a spoiled alcoholic and gambler. Salahuddin says goodbye to Manahil for the last time before her marriage, only to be accused of attempting to run away with her. Salahuddin clears the misunderstanding and leaves for Karachi to work at his friend Ifti's (Vasay Chaudhry) firm. In Karachi, he meets Ifti's sick father, Rehman (Talat Hussain). Rehman is treated poorly by Ifti's wife, Cookie (Arjumand Rahim), and the housekeeper Jameel (Saleem Mairaj). Salahuddin and Rehman develop a close bond and confide in each other.

Salahuddin starts to take care of Rehman while Manahil marries Mikaeel, who proves to be an abusive husband and a gambling addict. Tensions rise between Salahuddin and Ifti when Cookie accuses Salahuddin of conspiring against her to gain Rehman's favour with an eye on the latter's wealth. After a heated confrontation with Ifti and Cookie, Salahuddin decides to leave their house. When Salahuddin finds out Rehman is terminally ill, he begs Ifti to let him stay. Salahuddin agrees to Cookie's condition that he must care for Rehman instead of Jameel. Eventually, Ifti comes to terms with the truth and repents allowing his father to be mistreated. Rehman later dies of his cancer while Salahuddin is visiting his home. Salahuddin is devastated to learn of Rehman's death on his return. Jameel asks Salahuddin for forgiveness and requests to stay with him in his service. Jameel also hands him a sealed package from Rehman, which contains the papers of a high-value plot of land left in Salahuddin's name as a gift. A year later, Salahuddin becomes a successful and wealthy businessman while Manahil becomes a baby boy's mother. Mikaeel's behaviour towards Manahil and their child worsens, and he views them as obstacles to his lifestyle.

After three years, Salahuddin hires a new employee Jeena (Ayesha Khan). Jeena secretly falls in love with him and starts to place herself into his life by preparing meals for him and arranging his clothes despite being discouraged by Salahuddin. Manahil gives birth to her second child (a daughter). All this while, Salahuddin has been secretly keeping tabs on Manahil's life via Jameel, now his employee, friend, and trusted confidante. Mikaeel's gambling addiction continues to worsen. After his parents' death, he severs ties with Manahil and his children and abandons them. Manahil and Salahuddin come face to face. Salahuddin is devastated to see a ruined and broken Manahil. He realizes how his mistakes have led to her suffering. His care and concern for Manahil make her the target of Jeena's jealousy and insecurities. Salahuddin feels helpless as he tries to repair the harm he has done, realizing that the passage of time has left indelible scars on Manahil's soul.

== Cast ==
Main Characters of Mann Mayal featuring (left to right) Hamza Ali Abbasi as Salahuddin, Maya Ali as Manahil (Mannu), Gohar Rasheed as Mikael, and Ayesha Khan as Jeena

=== Main cast ===
- Hamza Ali Abbasi as Salahuddin Shahid
- Maya Ali as Manahil "Mannu" Javed
- Gohar Rasheed as Mikaeel Shahaab
- Ayesha Khan as Jeena

=== Recurring cast ===
- Saba Hameed as - Manahil's mother
- Naeem Tahir as Javed; Manahil's father
- Saleem Mairaj as Jameel; Salahuddin's assistant
- Lubna Aslam as Saliha; Manahil's aunt
- Hajra Khan as Manahil's aunt, Javed's sister
- Aiman Khan as Raabiya "Biya" Shahid; Salahuddin's sister and Mannu's best friend
- Shehryar Zaidi as Shahid; Salahuddin and Biya's father
- Ismat Zaidi as Durdana Shahid; Salahuddin and Biya's mother
- Mehmood Aslam as Shahaab; Mikaeel's father (died in an accident)
- Laila Zuberi as Rahila; Mikaeel's mother(died in an accident)
- Ayesha Khan as Mikaeel's grandmother
- Vasay Chaudhry as Ifti Rehman; Salahuddin's friend
- Arjumand Rahim as Cookie; Ifti's wife
- Talat Hussain as Rehman; Ifti's father
- Faizan Haque as Mikaeel's friend
- Haris Waheed as Mikaeel's gambling partner
- Haseeb Hassan as Receptionist (Guest appearance)
- Minal Khan as Cookie's friend
- Faakhir Mehmood as Aasim

== Episodes ==
No.	Directed by	Written by	Original release date	Bizaisa ratings
1	Haseeb Hassan	Samira Fazal	25 January 2016	49.6
Rabiya passes her exam with A grade, but Manahil finds out that she has failed. She is saddened by her result. Her father consoles her and tells her that he will ask Salahuddin to tutor her. Unknown to Manahil, a proposal came for her which she thinks is for her aunt's daughter Sara.
2	Haseeb Hassan	Samira Fazal	1 February 2016	54.0
Manahil becomes angry when she learns that the proposal came for her and gets mad at Salahuddin for not telling her. Rabiya confronts Salahuddin that he "loves" Manahil. Sara confronts Manahil and warns her that their family will never accept her relation with Salahuddin.
3	Haseeb Hassan	Samira Fazal	8 February 2016	43.7
When Salahuddin does not go to tutor Manahil, she gets worried and runs to Salahuddin's home, her parents find out about them and whole family dispute over whether Salahuddin is worthy of Manahil or not. Later, Manahil's father and her uncle reluctantly agree despite their reservations about Salahuddin. Manahil runs for Salahuddin. Manahil keeps knocking on Salahuddin's house door, but without opening the door, Salahuddin, with a heavy heart, tells her to leave.
4	Haseeb Hassan	Samira Fazal	15 February 2016	62.7
Manahil comes back to her house. Manahil's father accepts Mikaeel's proposal, while Salahuddin receives a job in his friend's firm in Karachi. Manahil's father meets Salahuddin and tells him that he is the "best" choice for Manahil but he wants better for his daughter and asks him to meet Mikaeel to inquire about him and his character.
5	Haseeb Hassan	Samira Fazal	22 February 2016	39.7
Salahuddin calls Manahil one last time before going to Karachi, where she expresses her love for him and he asks her to meet and she secretly escapes. Manahil's disappearance causes panic in the house so Manahil's father calls Salahuddin's parents and accuses them for this act, he gets to know that they both are together and orders them to get home. Upon reaching, Manahil defends Salahuddin, but he says that this was all his idea and they should not hurt or say anything to Manahil. Manahil's father warns Salahuddin to never come back.
6	Haseeb Hassan	Samira Fazal	29 February 2016	51.8
Salahuddin reaches Karachi and sees his friend, Ifti's, and his wife, Cookie's, estranged behaviour towards him. Manahil struggles and suffers in silence with her marriage as Mikaeel is more interested in spending his life alone rather than to be with someone. Manahil makes an effort to adjust with Mikaeel and asks him if she can come with him at his friends' but he refuses due to her senile fashion-style, she later calls Salahuddin.
7	Haseeb Hassan	Samira Fazal	7 March 2016	18.5
Salahuddin tells Manahil that they should not talk to each other and Manahil should only think about her husband and he needs to move on for his career. Which leaves Manahil heartbroken, so she changes her appearance to please Mikaeel. When Salahuddin sees Manahil, outside a parlour, in her new avatar, he feels guilty. Manahil finds out about Mikaeel's drinking and smoking. He scolds her for being a typical wife and tells his parents that he cannot live with her.
8	Haseeb Hassan	Samira Fazal	14 March 2016	16.3
Mikaeel asks Manahil to do house chores, along her social life with him. Cookie and Jameel mistreat Rehman while Salahuddin tries to help. Mikaeel's mother apologises to Manahil for Mikaeel's behaviour and habits, when Manahil asks for money for Mikaeel. Later, Rehman apologises for Cookie's behaviour and asks him to leave the house for better.
9	Haseeb Hassan	Samira Fazal	21 March 2016	74.3
After seeing Rehman's condition and knowing that he has cancer, Salahuddin decides to stay to take care of him. Manahil goes back to her home for the first time after marriage, where her father realises that she is not happy. Salahuddin and Rehman grow closer to each other which upsets Cookie. Salahuddin gets to know about Manahil being home.
10	Haseeb Hassan	Samira Fazal	28 March 2016	35.8
When Rehman gets to know about Salahuddin and Mannu, he tries to make Salahuddin understand about his love for Manahil, and asks him to go to her and try again, and if she rejects him, he wouldn't feel guilty later that he didn't even try. Manahil's family plans to invite Mikaeel, and her father calls him, but he misbehaves with him. So Manahil's father says that if he doesn't need Manahil, then Manahil doesn't need him either, and she will get a divorce.
11	Haseeb Hassan	Samira Fazal	4 April 2016	52.1
Cookie apologises to Rehman on request of Ifti. Rabiya informs Salahuddin that Manahil is getting divorce and tells him about Mikaeel's behavior with her. Salahuddin bids farewell to Rehman to meet Manahil. Salahuddin returns home, Manahil confronts him for leaving her in the first place and asks him to let her go. She also tells him that she will not leave Mikaeel. Mikaeel, still in debt and due to shortage of time, thinks of selling Manahil's jewellery on his friend's advice.
12	Haseeb Hassan	Samira Fazal	11 April 2016	37.2
Manahil's parents are surprised to see sudden change in Mikaeel's personality, however Manahil gets suspicious and finds out the real reason. Salahuddin leaves for Karachi, he finds out about Rehman's death and that left him a four-thousand-guz plot. Mikael's was about to slap him, but Manahil suddenly tells the truth about him selling her jewellery, and faints. Later, when Manahil awakes, Mikaeel yells at her for telling his parents about selling the jewellery. Mikaeel's father orders him to leave the house.
13	Haseeb Hassan	Samira Fazal	18 April 2016	90.4
Mikaeel's friend then advises him to father a child to divert the attention and to attain all the property and control over business. After one year, Manahil is pregnant and back home for the baby's birth. Salahuddin becomes a successful businessman and still deeply in love with Manahil. Manahil's father invite Salahuddin and his family before they shift to Karachi. Salahuddin and Manahil keep looking at each other. Manahil gives birth to a baby boy. Later, series take another leap of three years with Manahil pregnant with her second child. Mikaeel becomes more aggressive and unresponsive towards her and their son.
14	Haseeb Hassan	Samira Fazal	25 April 2016	45.4
Rabiya gets married and shifts to America with her husband. Rabiya takes her parents along with her too, as she is afraid to go alone. Jeena, who just got a job at Salahuddin's office, becomes obsessed with Salahuddin and secretly watches him. Jeena is orphan and lives alone. Manahil has labour pain, so she was going upstairs to tell Mikaeel's parents, when Mikaeel sees her, he thinks she is going to tell about his gambling, so he throws her back in her room and leaves. Manahil, unable to get up, faints there. Salahuddin orders Jameel to find out what happened. So Jameel becomes a temporary servant at Mikaeel's home. Manahil gives birth to a girl.
15	Haseeb Hassan	Samira Fazal	2 May 2016	44.4
Jameel follows Salahuddin's instructions to keep an eye on Manahil, and slowly develops a contact telling Salahuddin's sayings, who he refers to her as "Guru". Jameel comforts Manahil by telling about his Guru's instructions to solve her problems. Manahil and Mikaeel become more distant due to his behaviour. Manahil plans a picnic on the instructions of Guru for her children, where Salahuddin also follows them in the park.
16	Haseeb Hassan	Samira Fazal	9 May 2016	47.3
Salahuddin watches Tipu (Manahil's son. Manahil continues to talk to Salahuddin, who has disguised himself as "Guru" where he regularly watches Manahil. Manahil shares all kind of things with him (like about Salahuddin, Mikaeel's gambling). Jeena consistently tries to impress Salahuddin, she picks up the phone and later, develops a relation with his mother. Manahil finds out about Jameel and Salahuddin, she confronts Salahuddin and warns him not to intervene her life and warns, if he continues, she will commit suicide.
17	Haseeb Hassan	Samira Fazal	16 May 2016	52.9
Mikaeel misbehaves with his parents and orders the guards to throw them out of the casino. Heartbroken by his behaviour, both die in a car accident. Salahuddin, informed by Jameel. Mikaeel confronts Manahil for telling his parents about his gambling, to which she denies. Manahil goes to Salahuddin's office and accuses him of telling Mikaeel's truth to his parents and blames him for their death and for everything bad that happened in her life.
18	Haseeb Hassan	Samira Fazal	23 May 2016	58.9
Manahil wakes up at night to find her daughter having high temperature. She calls Mikaeel, but he doesn't pick up as he is busy in a party. She then calls Salahuddin for help. Salahuddin slaps Mikael. Jeena inquires about Manahil's relation with Salahuddin through his mother and becomes jealous. She expresses her feelings to Jameel and he warns her not to go after Salahuddin as it is a hollow pursuit. Salahuddin convince her to come home for sometime, so Manahil agrees. She burst into tears remembering her parents in-law and decides to leave Mikaeel once and for all.
19	Haseeb Hassan	Samira Fazal	30 May 2016	36.1
Jeena tries to get more along with Salahuddin and that's when he gets to know that she loves him. Mikaeel sells his mother's jewellery and says to Manahil to leave him and go with her parents. Jeena impress Salahuddin by cooking him breakfast and tells him about her family. Mikaeel tells Manahil that he wants to make this home a casino and throws Manahil, along with her children, out of the house.
20	Haseeb Hassan	Samira Fazal	6 June 2016	24.8
Manahil sells her earrings and necklace to buy a train ticket back to her home, but the money wasn't enough, so she calls Jameel for help. Jeena overhears Jameel talking to Manahil, and grabs his phone from him and accuses Manahil for destroying Salahuddin's life. Jameel takes Manahil and her children to his quarter of Salahuddin's home. While Jeena on the other hand, manipulates Salahuddin and gets him ready for engagement. Meanwhile, unknown to Salahuddin that Manahil is staying in his home, she runs to leave the room, only to end up being caught by him.
21	Haseeb Hassan	Samira Fazal	13 June 2016	60.8
Salahuddin tries to make Manahil understand that she should leave Mikaeel, whereas Jeena convinces her to go back and try again instead of going back home to her parents. Manahil agrees and asks Salahuddin to take her to Mikaeel one last time. There, Mikael gives her divorce. On his telephone conversation with Manahil's mother, Salahuddin finds out about Manahil's father's heart attack. Her mother asks him to keep her with him for a few more days. Manahil grabs his phone from him and, devastated by her situation, she informs her mother that Mikaeel has divorced her.
22	Haseeb Hassan	Samira Fazal	20 June 2016	36.5
Salahuddin tells Manahil that he would break off the engagement if he has to. Unknown to them Jeena overhears them and ask Manahil to leave. Finding Jeena with Manahil and seeing her cold behaviour with Manahil, he breaks his engagement. Manahil finds out about her father deteriorating and health breaks down in tears.
23	Haseeb Hassan	Samira Fazal	27 June 2016	18.3
Manahil's family convinces her to stay with Salahuddin for a while until her father's recovery. Jeena try to seduce Jameel and manipulates him with her tricks, she told him that she has feelings for him, and tries to turn him against Salahuddin. Jameel confess her love to Jeena when she threatens to leave. Salahuddin sister Rabiya calls him to leave Manahil, and move on with Jeena and informs about their parents coming to Karachi. Manahil overhears their conversation and ask him to marry Jeena to put all the rumors to rest.
24	Haseeb Hassan	Samira Fazal	4 July 2016	20.3
Jeena avoids Jameel as he tries to come near to her. Jeena uses Jameel to turn Salahuddin's parents against Manahil. Salahuddin mother taunts Manahil for getting divorced and living with Salahuddin under one roof. Jeena becomes anxious due to Jameel intervening her life, trying to spend time with her. Salahuddin's mother ask Manahil about Iddah of divorce and tells her to stay away from Salahuddin.
25	Haseeb Hassan	Samira Fazal	11 July 2016	45
Manahil asks Salahuddin to keep a distance from her after having the last conversation with his mother. Jeena asks Salahuddin's mother about their marriage, who tells her that proposal should come from her family member or friends; she then manipulates her against Manahil. Salahuddin's mother ask Manahil to do house chores; seeing her doing chores, Salahuddin confronts his mother and tells Jeena that he is going to marry Manahil and calls off his engagement with her.
26	Haseeb Hassan	Samira Fazal	18 July 2016	48.7
Disheartened by Salahuddin decision, Jeena vows to take revenge from him. She try to turned Jameel against Salahuddin in a fit of rage. She then lure Jameel into her love saying that if he helps her taking revenge from Salahuddin, she will marry him. Manahil tells Salahuddin that she cannot marry him and asks him to arrange tickets for her and children to Hyderabad but he refuses saying, "he can't let her go".
27	Haseeb Hassan	Samira Fazal	25 July 2016	71.7
Jeena meets Mikaeel and try to lure him out by convincing him to take Manahil and children back and then calls Manahil and accuse her of destroying their life. Jameel calls Jeena to tell her that Manahil is in park, where she reveals her plan that Mikaeel was never there to meet Manahil, instead to abduct the children.
28	Haseeb Hassan	Samira Fazal	1 August 2016	63.9
Salahuddin's confront Jameel and blames him for the incident. Jeena turns the situation against Jameel and blames him for getting caught. Hence Salahuddin throws Jameel throws out of their lives.
29	Haseeb Hassan	Samira Fazal	8 August 2016	61.5
Salahuddin shows no affection to her, when confronting by her mother he tells her that Manahil never loved her and he will go back to Jeena, leaving her mother in shock and furious. Jeena meets Manahil, where she create misunderstanding between Manahil and Salahuddin revealing that Salahuddin spent a night at her house. Manahil and Salahuddin had fight after she confront him, and both blamed each other for ruining their lives. Late Manahil leaves Salahuddin and went back to Mikaeel.
30	Haseeb Hassan	Samira Fazal	15 August 2016	54.2
Mikaeel asks Salahuddin to settle with him abroad so that he could start a new life, to which Salahuddin agrees. But seeing Salahuddin's sacrifices and gratitude towards children, Mikaeel feels guilty over his mistakes and instead asks Salahuddin to take care of Manahil and the children. He brings the children to Salahuddin and leaves. Failing in her plan of separating Manahil and Salahuddin, Jeena plans to poison Manahil and her children.
31	Haseeb Hassan	Samira Fazal	22 August 2016	48.7
Jeena adds poison to drinks that she plans to give Manahil and the children but is interrupted by Salahuddin, who drinks the juice despite knowing that Jeena has poisoned it. Jameel rushes into the house to save Manahil while Jeena flees. Mikaeel visits his parents' graves and accepts his mistakes for one last time, and asks them for their forgiveness. He then gets murdered over his gambling debt when his friend comes to claim his money. The doctor tells Manahil that Salahuddin's condition is lethal; disheartened by their fates and feeling responsible for his condition, she confesses her feelings for him, asks Jameel to take care of him and leaves.
32	Haseeb Hassan	Samira Fazal	29 August 2016	58.3
Manahil blames herself for ruining the lives of people around her and prays for Salahuddin's recovery. After failing in her attempt to separate Manahil and Salahuddin, and misunderstanding that she killed Salahuddin, Jeena kills herself. After Salahuddin's successful operation, Manahil leaves for Hyderabad without seeing him. In Hyderabad, Manahil recalls her memories and tells her father that she wants to start her life again on her own.
33	Haseeb Hassan	Samira Fazal	5 September 2016	68.1
Salahuddin searches for Manahil everywhere and finds out where she has been living. He visits her where she shuts the door after seeing him; she asks him to go and reminiscences how once she left her house for him, and he didn't open the door and complains about how he ruined their lives. Salahuddin then apologizes to Manahil for not making the right decisions, and both reconcile, proclaiming their love each other.

== Production ==
=== Development ===
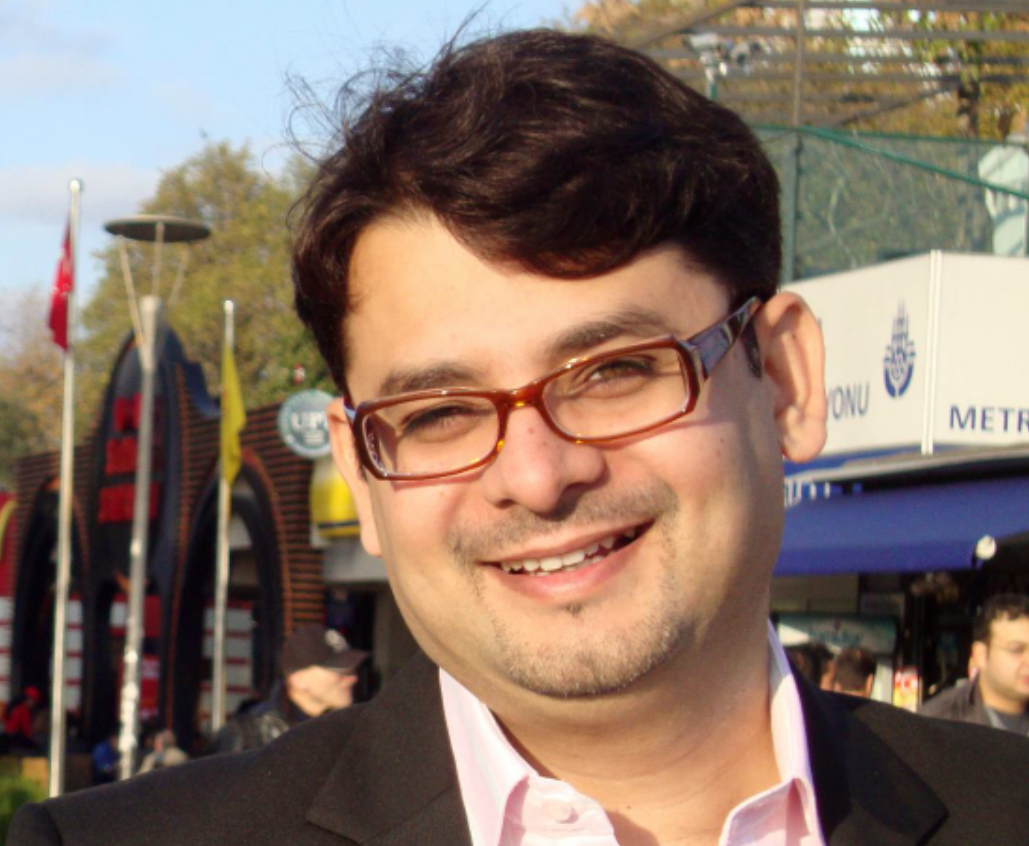
Director of series, Haseeb Hassan

Man Mayal was originally conceived by Hum TV's senior producer Momina Duraid and fashion-stylist Sana Shahnawaz as Tera Ghum Aur Hum in late July 2015, with Duraid's hiring Haseeb Hassan for direction, who was the director of channel's then running serial Diyar-e-Dil that ended in October 2015. Haseeb returns to direct third year in a row since his first project for channel in 2013. The screenplay for the serial is written by Lux Style Award-winning writer Samira Fazal who, previously wrote the screenplays of channel's critically acclaimed serials such as Dastaan, Bari Aapa, Mera Naseeb and most recently Alvida, it also marked the writer's first collaboration with Hassan.

In August 2015, Samina Humayun Saeed and Tariq Shah came on board as a co-producers, both Samina and Tariq previously produced cult followed-drama serial Sadqay Tumhare that aired between 2014 and 2015 television season. While Sana marked her production debut with this serial, she explained, "I'm thrilled to get a chance to work with such an amazing team so early on in my career. I couldn’t have found a better project than Mann Mayal to kick-start this new phase in my creative journey. It’s always a blast working with a team who are not only talented artists but also very dear friends. I’m confident the audiences are going to love this serial."

Writer Khalil-ur-Rehman Qamar initially wrote the lyrics for the series soundtrack and helped producer Sana coined then series name Tera Ghum Aur Hum. Filmmaker Mahesh Bhatt sends regards to Shahnawaz for her production venture. Series music and background score is composed by Hamza Jafri of MAD music, while title track composition and lyrics is written by Shuja Haider and Momina hired Qurat-ul-Ain Balouch to perform the song making her second collaboration with Duraid since 2011, for drama series Humsafar.

=== Casting ===
Creative head and producers Momina Duraid, Sana Shahnawaz and writer Sameera Fazal mutually choose the cast, which includes Maya Ali, Hamza Ali Abbasi to play the leading roles of Manahil, Salah-ul-Din and Gohar Rasheed, Ayesha Khan Meekail and Jeena played negative roles. None of the leading actors have appeared together on television except Hamza and Ayesha who worked together in a 2013 film Waar and Jawani Phir Nahi Ani, and Maya Ali, Ismat Zaidi and Shehryar Zaidi who have previously worked together in Geo TV's, Meri Zindagi Hai Tu. Saba Hameed and Hamza Ali Abbasi have previously worked together in ARY Digital's Pyaray Afzal. Speaking about her character Khan said, "my role is the surprise element in the drama. She is the game changer of the play. I opted for this role because she is not a typical damsel in distress which I think I have done umpteen times; instead she is needy for love. She gives unconditional love to others and expects the same for herself,". This is Mayal Ali second consecutive collaboration with director having previously worked in Diyar-e-Dil. Stating about her character Hamza said, "my character will create magic in this serial". Hamza who plays Afzal as his feature television debut in Piyaray Afzal in 2014, returns to play Salahuddin on the request of Sana. Hamza described his character "is close to who I am." In an interview Hamza explained that, "I have done this serial after giving a hit film because I don’t want to leave television and it is my moral commitment to myself to do one serial a year. Other than this, the story is not a typical saazishi aurto wali kahani and has room for me to come out as a better actor." Gohar who have worked with Abbasi in theater and films said about his character, "Mikail is rich and a little bit spoiled; he has his own set of insecurities which he tries to overcome in his own way."

Veteran Actors Mehmood Aslam and Laila Zuberi were cast to portray the role of Mikael's parents, this roles were initially offered to actors Javed Sheikh and Atiqa Odho. Veteran actors' Saba Hameed and Naeem Tahir were cast for the role Manahil's parents and Shehryar Zaidi and Ismat Zaidi were cast for the role of Salah-ul-Din's parents, popular soap actress Aiman Khan plays the role of Rabiya as Salah-ul-Din younger sister and Manahil's friend. The series also cast Arjumand Rahim, Vasay Chaudhry and National award-winning actor Talat Hussain for the roles of Ifti, Cookie and Rehman.

=== Filming and locations ===
Principal photography commenced on early June 2015 and was completed in September 2015, with a total of thirty-three episodes. Director Haseeb Hassan and production house delayed the ongoing shoot of their series Sanam which was under-production to film ‘’Mann Mayal’’. During the shoot the title of Tera Gham Or Hum was used. Shooting was extensively done in remote areas of Hyderabad, Sindh and in Clifton in Karachi, Sindh.

Several sets-locations were real including Salahuddin's home, which was a 'hundred-year' Haveli, director Hassan said, "The haveli we chose as Hamza’s house was almost 100 hundreds year old. I am glad we shot there because it has been demolished by government now,". Shooting locations were overseen by art director Zeeshan. In an interview Haseeb said, "The wonderful artwork you will notice in the drama has been done by Zeeshan. Whenever I take up any project I always have some period in mind; and this serial the props and accessories we have used would represent the old era and it has been done in a way that everything looks relatable,". Cinematographer Zeb Rao and editor Mehmood Ali return as director of photography and chief editing respectively as both previously worked with Duraid's Diyar-e-Dil that earned them critical praise and acclaim.

== Music ==
Mann Mayal OST

Soundtrack album by Qurat-ul-Ain Balouch and Shuja Haider
- Released: 23 January 2016
- Recorded: 2016
- Genre: Television soundtrack
- Length: 04 Minutes 06 Seconds (4:06)
- Languages: Punjabi, Urdu
- Label: M.D Productions
- Producer: Momina Duraid

Music video
- "Mann Mayal" OST on YouTube

The title song of Mann Mayal was composed by musician Shuja Haider, who also penned down the lyrics while the background score for the series is done by Mad Music. The OST was performed by Qurat-ul-Ain Balouch '"QB". with Shuja Hyder as being in the chorous. It marks the return of QB to Hum TV, since she performed the OST of Roshan Sitara in 2012 and earlier it she performed the OST of channel's blockbuster drama series Humsafar's title song "Woh Humsafar Tha" in 2012.

The soundtrack was praised for its lyrics and composition and vocals, QB and co-singer Shuja Hyder received much appraisal for their singing as well as enthusiastic reviews for Hyder composing, particularly Hyder being praised for "his vocals add depth and variety to the proceedings." Popularity of "Tere Naal Mein laiyan" led an online competition where on 9 February Hum Network announced on its Facebook page to "record the soundtrack and inbox to series official page, to win a title of Voice of Art and gifts hampers."

=== Track listing ===
All lyrics are written by Shuja Haider; all music is composed by Shuja Haider and Mad Music.

No.	Title	Artist(s)	Length
1.	"Tere Naal Mein laiyan"	Qurat-ul-Ain Balouch and Shuja Haider	4:06
2.	"Tere Naal Mein laiyan (slow version)"	Rasmia Baloch and Shuja Haider	4:11
Total length:			8:17

== Broadcast and release ==
=== Broadcast ===
Mann Mayal was originally scheduled to air in late December 2015, however, due to post-production delays, Hum TV rescheduled the series for January 2016. It was initially titled Tera Ghum Aur Hum in an early press releases but then it was changed to Dil-e-Jaanam and then to Mann Mayal, with no official reason given by Hum Network management to these changes. Mann Mayal aired a weekly episode on every Monday succeeding TV series Maan which was shifted on Friday after the finale of Tumhare Siwa, starting from its premiere date, with time slot of 8:00 pm. It was announced that series will be premiered on 22 January 2016 after Tumhare Siwa but then moved to Monday with the premiere date of 25 January. The show approximately airs weekly episode for 35–40 minutes (without commercials). The series was ordered and comprised the section of 33 episodes whereas initially it was announced to air 24 episodes. It was aired on Hum Europe in UK, on Hum TV USA in USA and Hum TV Mena on UAE, with same timings and premiered date. All International broadcasting aired the series in accordance with their standard times. By July 2016 Mann Mayal was broadcast by Hum Network's new channel Hum World HD for US region and In 2022, it aired in India on channel Zee Zindagi.

== Reception ==
=== Television ratings ===
Number of Episodes	Timeslot (PST)	Premiere			Finale			TV Season	Rank	Overall viewership
Number of Episodes	Timeslot (PST)	Date	PAK Viewers (Millions)	Television Rating Points (TRP)	Date	PAK Viewers (Millions)	Television Rating Points (TRP)	TV Season	Rank	Overall viewership
33	Mondays; 08:00 pm	25 January 2016	15	4.9	5 September 2016	30	9.3	2016	#1	48.3

Mann Mayal premiered with 11 million viewers in Pakistan, while on 29 January 2016, Hum TV announced that the pilot episode had received 4.9 Television Rating Points (TRP), which was the channel's highest ratings. Second week in a row it received the highest TRPs with 5.9 and for second and third episodes. For consecutive seven weeks it was the highest-rated drama series with ratings of 6.2 TRP respectively. On 30 March 2016 Hum TV announced that the channel has gained 5.8 TRPs for series tenth episode, the next week ratings were up further with 6.7 TRP for eleventh episode, with episodes twelve, thirteen and fourteen Mann Mayal was rated with TRP of 4.4, 6.7 and 5.8. Moreover, fifteenth-episode of series achieved highest ratings of 8.1 TRP, according to the channel, it was network's highest rating for any series in 2016. Hunza Gul of Brandsynario stated that Mann Mayal, was the highest trending topic of Twitter., with next three weeks it scored TRP of 6.7 for sixteenth and eighteenth episode and 4.2 for seventeenth.

From nineteenth episode to its twenty-first, the series scored TRP of 6.3, 6.5 and 6.7, on its twenty-third and twenty-fifth episode it received 7.4 and 7.7TRP. It achieved the record breaking 9.7 TRPs on Its Twenty-sixth episode breaking all the previous records including channels 2013 series, Humsafar and Zindagi Gulzar Hai. Mann Mayal was placed on first position on a list of top 10 Pakistani shows of 2016, It scored 6.1, 6.7 and 7.1TRPs for the twenty-seventh, twenty-eighth and twenty-ninth episodes, respectively. Close to finale, on its thirtieth episode Mann Mayal peaked at 5.5 TRPs, furthermore on its thirty-second episode it averaged 6.1 TRPs. The Last episode of Mann Mayal averaged 7.1 TRPs peaking at TRP more than 9.3 and maximising 9.8 as claimed by the channel on their Facebook page.

Mann Mayal TV Ratings : Pakistan viewers per episode (millions)

Season	Episode number																																
Season	1	2	3	4	5	6	7	8	9	10	11	12	13	14	15	16	17	18	19	20	21	22	23	24	25	26	27	28	29	30	31	32	33
1	4.9	5.9	5.9	6.2	6.2	6.2	6.2	6.2	6.2	5.8	6.7	4.4	6.7	5.8	8.1	6.7	4.2	6.2	6.3	6.5	6.7	6.5	7.4	7.4	7.7	9.7	6.1	6.7	7.1	5.5	6.1	6.9	9.8

Source: Kantar Media TRP's and Audience Management, see

=== Viewership ===
From its eighth till fifteenth episode Mann Mayal averages 2.2 Million Viewers according to MediaLogic’s overnight ratings. Onwards episode eighteenth, series begin receiving negative reviews from the critics, despite this it reached points more that 2.9 Million views till episode 21. Till episode thirty Mann Mayal received 2.9 Million viewers where as on its final episode it finally reached a record viewership more than 3.5 Million viewers.

=== Critical reception ===
Before the premiere of series, Mann Mayal was listed as one of the most anticipated serials of 2016. Writing for Dawn News, Sadaf Haider remarked, "This is a well-made drama worth watching. Anyone who sees the first episode can not wait to see the next. If Mann Mayal can steer clear of obvious clichés, it has the potential to not only be a blockbuster, or a 'must watch', but something iconic. All the ingredients are there." In April issue of The Express Tribune, Mann Mayal was ranked second behind Dillagi.

In a less enthusiastic review for The Express Tribune Kanza Riaz said that, "Mann Mayal is teaching our society some horrendously wrong things." She heavily criticized the serial saying, "the director and producer chose to tell a story of a weak woman who falls in love with her neighbour/friend's brother for no apparent reason. She then employs every cheap trick in the book to attract him and convinces him to ask her parents for her hand in marriage." She further evaluate the role of women in society being "powerful" not "weak" and condemn "love marriage" concept in Pakistani culture. She praised the previous women oriented dramas such as Daam, Durr-e-Shehwar, Zindagi Gulzar Hai and Alpha Bravo Charlie. She concluded by saying "our entertainment media has become extremely commercialised and rating-oriented." Ayesha Siddique of The Nation opposes the idea of spreading "wrong message" to the people and said, "Mann Mayal is attempting to make girls more expressive and bolder," and explained that, "If a girl likes someone she should express her feelings. It is not against the dignity of a woman. It is not against anyone’s dignity at all. The taboo over a woman proposing to a man should be revisited."

The soundtrack of the series was heavily praised and has garnered more than a million views on YouTube, according to Saavn, the series ranked the top charts for three consecutive weeks of its release, and on the new official Pakistani music app Taazi, the song was among the highest-rated original soundtrack of series followed By "Yar-e-Man" of Diyar-e-Dil. In lukewarm a review for Dawn News Sadaf haider felt that series suffers from "obvious plot holes" and stated "What doesn't make sense is that each character can see a clear path out of distress but they refuse to take it." In another review, she opined, "Despite the soaring music Hum TV uses to invoke a pavlovian response out of its audience, much of the dramatic tension required to connect emotionally with the plot is lacking." In a negative review, she found that, "Team Mann Mayal has managed to produce a very slick product, easily digested by the masses. While there are complaints of plot loopholes and one dimensional characters, this started off as a very popular serial and still is. So far, Mann Mayal has offered nothing new or challenging. It confirms every stereotype and comforts its audience’s prejudices, making it a winning and very commercially viable combination."

The character of Mikaeel (portrayed by Gohar Rasheed) received critical appraisal from critics, but he faces criticism and harsh reaction from public, in an interview he said, "a woman came up to me and asked if I am Mikaeel from Mann Mayal, when I said yes, she responded, You are a bad person and you should leave this place before we slap you." Gohar has been associated with organization that run for Down Syndrome Program causes and in a wake of this cause he auctioned all of his wardrobe from series to raise funds for this programs, he said, "I am honored to be a part of this auction and to do something for these children and I hope everyone to be a part of this auction and raise money for Karachi Down Syndrome."

Despite receiving highest-ratings, Mann Myal has been a subject of skeptical reviews and reception. In addition to critical reviews Jeenas character received wide media attention and has been a subject of controversy since beginning. Commenting on her character Ayesha Khan said, "With Mann Mayal, people hate my character Jeena but that’s the success of the character. What is frustrating though is when people can’t seem to differentiate between my onscreen persona and who I am in real life."mean I'm going to take their words to heart and change who I am over it. For me these judgments by bloggers are trash and that's exactly where they go,"

Sadaf Haider of DAWM Images wrote, "Mann Mayal is an undeniable runaway commercial success, it will not have the repeat value or iconic status that Humsafar, Diyar-e-Dil, Pyarey Afzal, Dastaan, Aun Zara, or other great iconic serials have. It will go down as just another pot boiler that made a lot of money, which is shame because this serial started off with a spark of brilliance." Furthermore, it was criticized for its storyline with critics saying it "senseless", and was panned for its overrun which initially was to have only twenty-four episodes. The finale episode of series revived widespread criticism and critical reviews both from public and critics. In a brief review of series, Sadaf Haider of Dawn News wrote, "even Mannu's newfound feminism couldn't save Mann Mayal's last episode, and further stated, "Mann Mayal had some great production value in the first 20 episodes, the script still had some internal logic and it has always been beautifully picturised. High ratings may well have been the reason for its decline in quality, as the producers realised that this cash cow could be milked for another 10 episodes." In a 2021 article by Aqsa Younas of The Friday Times, the portrayal of the protagonist as a 'good wife' who faces abuse and depends on a man to save her, and the antagonist who is portrayed as selfish because she is determined was criticised.

=== Controversies ===
Kanza Riaz of The Express Tribune wrote for her February 2016 blog stating that Mann Mayal is teaching our society some horrendously wrong things! Riaz discouraged the plot of Manahil and Salahuddin's love story saying that Mannu's young age love has a negative affect for Pakistan's youth, she also says that it highlights a bad influent for women. Riaz discouraged the introduction episodes saying Just three episodes in, I have to say that I, for one, am heavily disappointed. The director and producer chose to tell a story of a weak woman who falls in love with her neighbour/friend’s brother for no apparent reason. She then employs every cheap trick in the book to attract him and convinces him to ask her parents for her hand in marriage. Lastly Riaz comments on Mann Mayal's television rating The rating of Mann Mayal has gone through the roof; young women are ardently watching the show and what’s sad is that they are even impressed and inspired by it! We are showing these girls that it’s okay to lust after our smoulderingly handsome teachers. Looking to this Director Haseeb Hassan cleared the entire controversy in his interview with HIP.

== Awards and accolades ==
Year	Award	Date	Category	Recipient(s)	Result	Ref.
2016	Hum Awards	April 23, 2016; 28 May 2016 (televised)	Best Drama Serial	Momina Duraid	Nominated	
2016	Hum Awards	April 23, 2016; 28 May 2016 (televised)	Best Drama Serial - Popular	Momina Duraid	Nominated	
2016	Hum Awards	April 23, 2016; 28 May 2016 (televised)	Best Director Drama Serial	Haseeb Hassan	Nominated	
2016	Hum Awards	April 23, 2016; 28 May 2016 (televised)	Best Actor - Popular	Hamza Ali Abbasi	Won	
2016	Hum Awards	April 23, 2016; 28 May 2016 (televised)	Best Actress - Popular	Maya Ali	Nominated	
2016	Hum Awards	April 23, 2016; 28 May 2016 (televised)	Best Supporting Actor	Gohar Rasheed	Won	
2016	Hum Awards	April 23, 2016; 28 May 2016 (televised)	Best Writer Drama Serial	Samira Fazal	Nominated	
2016	Hum Awards	April 23, 2016; 28 May 2016 (televised)	Best Original Soundtrack	Tere Naal Mein Laiyaan	Won	
2016	Hum Awards	April 23, 2016; 28 May 2016 (televised)	Best Onscreen Couple Jury	Hamza Ali Abbasi & Maya Ali	Nominated	
2016	Hum Awards	April 23, 2016; 28 May 2016 (televised)	Best Onscreen Couple - Popular	Hamza Ali Abbasi & Maya Ali	Won	
2016	Hum Awards	April 23, 2016; 28 May 2016 (televised)	Best Actor in a Negative Role	Ayesha Khan	Nominated	
2016	Lux Style Awards	April 19, 2017; 20 August 2016 (televised)	Best TV Play	Momina Duraid, Samina Humayun Saeed	Nominated	
2016	Lux Style Awards	April 19, 2017; 20 August 2016 (televised)	Best TV Director	Haseeb Hassan	Nominated	
2016	Lux Style Awards	April 19, 2017; 20 August 2016 (televised)	Best TV Writer	Samira Fazal	Nominated	
2016	Lux Style Awards	April 19, 2017; 20 August 2016 (televised)	Best Original Soundtrack	Momina Duraid	Won	
2016	Lux Style Awards	April 19, 2017; 20 August 2016 (televised)	Best Actress	Maya Ali	Won	

== See also ==
- 2016 in Pakistani television
- List of programs broadcast by Hum TV
