= Masud =

Masum
- Gender: masculine
- Languages: Arabic: مسعود اِقرا:مَس عَود, Persian: مسعود خوانده شود:مسود

Origin
- Meaning: fortunate, prosperous, lucky, happy

Other names
- Alternative spelling: Masoud, Massoud, Massoude, Massudeh, Masood, Masʽud, Mashud, Messaoud, Mesut, Mesud

Masud (Arabic: مسعود اِقرا:مَس عَود, romanized: fortunate, prosperous, lucky, happy, Persian: مسعود خوانده شود:مسود) is a given name and a surname, commonly found in the Middle East and Asia. Notable people with the name include:

== Given name ==
- Masʽud I (998–1040), sultan of the Ghaznavid Empire
- Masud Ahmad (1943–2018), Pakistani theoretical physicist
- Masud Ahmed (born 1955), Bangladeshi bureaucrat
- Masud Akhond (born 1972), Bangladeshi actor, director, and writer
- Masud Alioghlu (1928–1973), Azerbaijani writer
- Masud Arun, Bangladeshi politician
- Masud Choudhary (1944–2022), Indian civil servant, educator, social reformer, thinker, and politician
- Masud Uddin Chowdhury (born 1954), Bangladeshi Army general
- Masud ibn Davud, Azerbaijani architect
- Masud Gharahkhani (born 1982), Iranian-born Norwegian politician
- Masud Ghnaim (born 1965), an Israeli Arab politician
- Masud Husain, British neurologist and neuroscientist
- Masud Jani, 13th century governor of Bengal
- Masʽud El-Jibril, Nigerian politician
- Masud Karim (1936–1996), Bangladeshi lyricist
- Masud Khan (1924–1989), British psychoanalyst
- Masud Ali Khan (1929–2024), Bangladeshi actor
- Masud Husain Khan (1919–2010), Indian linguist
- Masud Minhas (1911–1936), Indian field hockey player
- Masud Bin Momen, Bangladeshi diplomat
- Masud ibn Namdar, Kurdish document collector and writer
- Masud Naraghi (died 2020), Iranian-born American nuclear physicist and engineer
- Masud Pathik (born 1979), Bangladeshi filmmaker, poet, and lyricist
- Masʽud Hai Rakkaḥ (1690–1768), Sephardi Jewish Hakham and shadar
- Masud Hassan Rizvi (1893–1975), Indian author
- Masud Sabri (1886–1952), Uyghur governor of Xinjiang
- Masud Sa'd Salman (died 1121), Persian poet
- Masud Sezan, Bangladeshi television series and telefilm director
- Masud Shah (died 1246), sultan of the Delhi Sultanate
- Masʽud ibn Muhammad Sijzi, Persian physician
- Masud Yunus (1952–2020), Indonesian politician

== Surname ==
- Faisal Masud (1954–2019), Pakistani endocrinologist
- Khalid Masud (1935–2003), Pakistani Islamic scholar
- Mohammad Masud (1905–1948), Iranian journalist
- Muhammad Khalid Masud (born 1939), Pakistani judge and Islamic scholar
- Naiyer Masud (1936–2017), Indian Urdu short-story writer and literary critic
- Rahmad Mas'ud (born 1976), Indonesian politician and the current mayor of Balikpapan, East Kalimantan
- Zafar Masud (air commodore) (1927–2003), Pakistan Air Force personnel
