= Khalid Ahmad =

Pakistani writer and poet

Khalid Ahmad خالد احمد PP
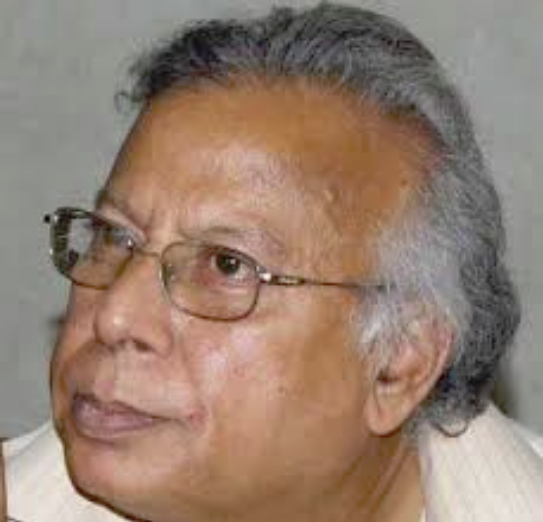
- Khalid Ahmad at an event
- Born: June 5, 1943; Lucknow, British India
- Died: March 19, 2013 (aged 69); Lahore, Pakistan
- Occupations: Poet; Playwright; Columnist
- Spouse: Rabana Khalid
- Relatives: Ahmaq Phaphoondvi (Father); Hajra Masroor (Sister); Khadija Mastoor (Sister)
- Writing career
- Language: Urdu
- Notable awards: Pride of Performance in 2011

Khalid Ahmad, PP (5 June 1943 – 19 March 2013) was a Pakistani Urdu poet, playwright and columnist. He was born in Lucknow, to Mohammad Mustafa Khan 'Maddah', a well-known writer and politician for the Indian National Congress.

== Family ==
Khalid belonged to a learned family of academic and literary background. His father, known by his alias “Ahmaq Phaphoondvi”, spent most of his life in prison for writing against the British rule. His mother, Anwar Jahan Begum, was his father’s second wife and had seven children from her first marriage. Several of Khalid’s step-siblings, including Khadija Mastoor and Hajra Masroor, gained international recognition as authors.

== Early life ==
Following the partition of British India in 1947, four-year-old Khalid, along with his mother and step-siblings, relocated to Pakistan. His father, however, chose not to migrate, as he was against the partition. Famous poet and writer Ahmad Nadeem Qasmi was their family's guardian and close friend.

He completed his schooling and matriculation at Muslim Model High School in Lahore, in 1957. Afterward, he earned his bachelor's degree from Dyal Singh College. He then pursued a Master's degree in Physics from Government College Lahore and started working as an information officer at WAPDA, later he retired from the post of Deputy Controller.

== Career ==
=== Columnist ===
Khalid started writing a column for the Daily Imroz. He then wrote for Jang Karachi, followed by Jang Lahore. Later, he was transferred to Tarbela, where he stopped writing for three years. Upon his return, he resumed writing for Jang Lahore. In the last six years of his life, he wrote for Nawa-i-Waqt. Throughout his career, his columns were written under the title of "Lamha-Lamha". Most of his Daily Imroz columns were compiled into a book called "Lamha Lamha".

=== Pakistan Television Corporation (PTV) ===
He worked as both an essayist and playwright for the Pakistan Television Corporation, writing numerous drama serials, plays, and documentaries. He gained recognition for creating dramas without traditional villains, which led to his writing Kajal Ghar. Among his dramas, Kajal Ghar, Kiran and Ghubar were rated as the number one shows on PTV throughout their broadcast. He also wrote several plays and songs for Radio Pakistan.

=== Poetry ===
He became known among the masses owing to his beautiful poetry. Khalid wrote poetry regularly for several literary magazines. Five of his books are compilations of his poetry. He is counted among the poets who introduced Urdu Ghazal to new trends, giving a new definition to progressive-ism. One of his famous Ghazal, "Tark-e-Talluqat" features lines that were incorporated into the drama Humsafar's opening theme song "Woh Humsafar Tha" by Quratulain Balouch;

"tark-e-talluqat pe roya na tu na main lekin ye kya ki chain se soya na tu na main"

=== Monthly Bayaz ===
He also published his Urdu monthly literary magazine "Bayaz" for 22 years, before his death. It featured many famous poets, including Jaun Elia, Ahmad Faraz, Habib Jalib and Ahmad Nadeem Qasmi.

== Selected bibliography ==
=== Books ===
- Tashbeeb
- Hatheliyon par Charagh
- Pehli Sada Parinde Ki
- Aik Muthi Havaa
- Daraz Palkon ke Saaye Saaye
- Jadeed Tar Pakistani Adab
- Nam Garifta

=== Drama Serials & Plays ===
Name	Channel	Year
Raqeeb	PTV	
Aik Aur Aik Gyara	PTV	
Baton Baton Main	PTV	
Kiran	PTV	1989
Ghubar	PTV	1996
Khirman	PTV	
Kajal Ghar	PTV	2001

== Awards and recognition ==
- In recognition of his exceptional literary contributions, he was awarded the prestigious Pride of Performance award in 2011 by the President of Pakistan.
- Received the Qaumi Adabi Award (Iqbal Award) in 1999, from the prestigious Pakistan Academy of Letters for his Urdu poetry book "Daraz Palkon Ke Saaye Saaye".
- In 2021, the Pakistan Academy of Letters released an Urdu book on his life and work, which was part of their series; "Pakistani Adab Ke Maymar".

== Death ==
He died of lung cancer on March 19, 2013, due to his long history of smoking. He was survived by his wife, two sons, and a daughter.

The literary community expressed their condolences and grief over his death. Amjad Islam Amjad, in his tribute, shared that he had lost a lifelong companion, describing him as a poet of substance and a man with a strong resolve. Ata ul Haq Qasmi remembered him as a stern and dedicated poet. The Punjab Chief Minister, Shehbaz Sharif expressed deep sorrow over his death, remembering him for his unique poetry. A large number of people from the literary circles attended Khalid Ahmad’s funeral.
