= Zameen (novel) =

Urdu novel by Khadija Mastoor

- Author: Khadija Mastoor
- Original title: زمین
- Translator: Daisy Rockwell
- Language: Urdu
- Genres: Historical fiction; Social novel
- Set in: Pakistan in the late 1940s
- Published: 1983
- Publisher: Idara-e-Farogh-e-Urdu
- Publication place: Pakistan
- English publication date: 2019
- Media type: Print (paperback)
- Pages: 238 (first edition)
- ISBN: 9693505743 (Sang-e-Meel Publications, 1995)
- OCLC: 14358029
- Dewey Decimal: 891.439371
- LC Class: PK2200.K394 Z24

Zameen (Urdu: زمین, romanized: Zamīn, lit. 'land'), alternatively spelled Zamin, is an Urdu novel by Pakistani novelist and short story writer Khadija Mastoor. The novel was published posthumously by Idara-e-Farogh-e-Urdu in 1983. Daisy Rockwell, PhD, translated it into English and released it in July 2019 under the title A Promised Land. Zameen depicts the economic and political upheaval during the partition of British India. It begins at the final setting of Mastoor's first novel Aangan – the Walton refugee camp in Lahore. Consequently, it is sometimes considered an extension of Aangan, however, Rockwell has clarified that it is not a narrative sequel, rather a philosophical and thematic follow-up. It is considered a political allegory and a women-centric historical account of Pakistan's independence.

== Characters ==
Zameen's main characters are:

- Sajida (Sājidah) – the intelligent protagonist. After migrating to Pakistan, she lives with her father at a refugee camp.
- Nazim (Nāẓim) – a Department of Rehabilitation official at the camp who insists Sajida to live at his home with him and his family
- Saleema (Salīmah) – a passionate student, Nazim's female cousin
- Kazim (Kāẓim) – Nazim's amoral and feudalistic brother

== Reception ==
Critic and fiction writer Muhammad Ahsan Farooqi found the novel rich in Mastoor's style of dialogue writing and exposition. Writing about Zameen in his essay "Āṅgan Par Ek Naẓar " (transl. A Look at Aangan) he said, "Where she has used other literary devices to develop the story and the characters against a specific backdrop, she has also taken great care of speech and style." Farooqi compared her storytelling skill to that of Jane Austen.

Khadija Mastoor ... has possibly surpassed all the male and female novelists, with the exception of Qurratul Ain Haider, with her first novel Aangan ... which is a rare example of artistic creation. In her perfection of art she comes close to Jane Austen. Her second novel Zameen, a posthumous publication, is quite good but it is not comparable to Aangan.

— Nazeer Siddiqi, Reflections on Life and Literature (1994)

In his book, Muhammad Naseem said that the author had presented the issues of the establishment of Pakistan and the migration with impartiality and skill. She has very well represented the feelings of a woman. Ahmad Nadeem Qasmi wrote in his article, "The way Aangan's Aaliya and Zameen's Sajida dominate their environment, could it be Khadija's own personality trait? But in my opinion, even more than her personality, it is Khadija's subconscious desire to see the woman dignified, which is embodied in Aaliya and Sajida."

Shaista Hameed attested that the author wrote "every single line of her novels with blood, sweat, and tears". The novel is considered a specimen of her skill of making prose memorable, without being idealistic or mixing lies in it.

Reviewing A Promised Land in Dawn, Asif Farrukhi called Zameen a "neglected novel", while Scroll.in called it "Khadija Mastur's neglected masterpiece" when it republished the article. Lalitha Subramanian noted in the Deccan Herald the absence of bitterness towards India and recommending the novel to Indian readers, appreciated the Pakistani author's regard for Mahatma Gandhi.
