= Mesut =

Mesut is a Turkish given name for males, derived from the Arabic name Masoud. Notable people named Mesut include:

== First name ==
- Mesut of Menteşe (died 1319), Turkish bey
- Mesut Akusta (born 1964), Turkish actor
- Mesut Bakkal (born 1964), Turkish football manager
- Mesut Çaytemel (born 1984), Turkish footballer
- Mesut Cemil (1902–1963), Turkish composer and musician
- Mesut Doğan (born 1982), Turkish Austrian futsal player
- Mesut İktu (1947–2026), Turkish operatic baritone
- Mesut Kurtis (born 1981), Turkish-Macedonian singer
- Mesut Mert (born 1978), Bulgarian football player
- Mesut Özil (born 1988), German football player
- Mesut Ünal (born 1973), Turkish footballer
- Mesut Yavaş (born 1978), Turkish athlete
- Mesut Yılmaz (1947–2020), Turkish politician

== Middle name ==
- Ali Mesut Erez (1922–2011), Turkish politician
