= Masood Ashar =

Pakistani novelist, translator, columnist (died 2021)

SI PP Masood Ashar
- مسعود اشعر
- Born: 10 February 1931; Rampur, Rampur State, British India
- Died: 5 July 2021 (aged 90); Lahore, Punjab, Pakistan
- Occupations: Short story writer, novelist, translator, journalist and columnist
- Awards: 2010 – Pride of Performance Award by the President of Pakistan; 2015 – Sitara-i-Imtiaz Award by the Government of Pakistan

Masood Ahmad Khan (Urdu: مسعود اشعر; Masʻūd Ashʻar; 10 February 1931 – 5 July 2021), better known as Masood Ashar, was a Pakistani Urdu short story writer, novelist, journalist, columnist and translator. On 23 March 2010, he was awarded the Pride of Performance by the President of Pakistan. In 2015, he received the Sitara-i-Imtiaz, third-highest civilian award of Pakistan.

== Early life ==
Masood Ashar was born on 10 February 1931, in Rampur, Uttar Pradesh, India. Ashar completed his early education from the Madrasa-i-Aliya in Rampur. He did his matriculation from Allahabad board in 1948 and did his graduation from Agra.

== Career ==
In 1951, Ashar migrated to Pakistan after completing his graduation and lived in Lahore and Multan where he worked for Zamindar, Daily Imroze, Roznama Ahsan and weekly Aasaar. In 1954, when he joined Urdu Daily Imroze as senior sub-editor then during that period Ahmed Nadeem Qasmi was the editor of Imroz. In 1958, Masood Ashar became the resident editor of Imroz, Multan.

In 1978, during Gen Zia’s dictatorial regime, when massacre at Multan Colony Textile Mills happened then Masood Ashar printed the news of the accident in Daily Imroze. As a punishment, he was transferred from Multan to Lahore. In 1983, he was sacked from his job when he signed a demand for revival of democracy in the country. In 1988, during the government of Benazir Bhutto, he was reinstated to his post and he retired from the newspaper, Daily Imroze as its editor. In 1992, he was associated with a publishing house called Mashal. He frequently visited literary gatherings of the Pak Tea House.

== Works ==
Masood Ashar had written several poems and short stories. In 1948, his first short story was published in Fasana, a journal from Allahabad. In 1964, after a long gap, he returned to writing short stories and his story was published in Savera. He wrote short stories, Ankhon Par Dono Hath in 1974, Saray Afsanay in 1987, Apna Ghar in 2004, Sawal Kahani in 2019. The Oxford University Press published Intikhab: Masood Ashar, a selection of Masood Ashar short stories which was edited by Asif Farrukhi.

=== As writer ===
- Pakistani Adab-1993
- Bismillah Ka Gumbad

=== As translator ===
- Zindagi Se Najat

== Death ==
Masood Ashar died in Lahore on 5 July 2021. He was buried in Lahore. Thousands of people attended his funeral.

== Awards ==
- 2010, Pride of Performance Award by the President of Pakistan.
- 2015, Sitara-i-Imtiaz, third-highest civilian award of Pakistan.
