= Aakhri Station =

Aakhri Station may refer to:

- Aakhri Station (miniseries), a 2018 Pakistani television drama miniseries
- Aakhri Station (film), a 1965 Pakistani Urdu-language film
