= Mesud =

Mesud may refer to:

- Mesud I, sultan of the Seljuqs of Rum from 1116 until his death in 1156
- Mesud II, bore the title of Seljuq Sultan of Rum at various times between 1284 and 1308

See also

- Masoud
