= DD Urdu =

Urdu language TV channel

- Country: India
- Broadcast area: Parts of Asia including India, China and Gulf countries
- Headquarters: New Delhi, India

Programming
- Language(s): Urdu; Hindi; English

Ownership
- Owner: Doordarshan
- Sister channels: DD National

History
- Launched: 15 August 2006
- Former names: Doordarshan Kendra Delhi

Links
- Website: doordarshan.gov.in/ddurdu

DD Urdu is an Indian free-to-air television channel broadcasting from the Doordarshan Studios in New Delhi. It broadcasts entertainment, cultural, news and infotainment programming in the Urdu standard of the Hindustani language. DD Urdu is a round-the-clock infotainment channel of the Doordarshan family. It was launched on 15 August, 2006 to preserve and promote the great cultural heritage of Urdu language & India. Right from its inception, the channel has been spreading its aesthetic sweetness, It provides its viewers with profound content in Urdu language. Urdu has been a language of Heart beats across the boundaries and a blend, containing Hindi and colloquial dialects, thereby making it a Language of Every One. So, now, Urdu Admirers are the Proud Patrons of a Universal Language.

The channel produces a variety of shows related to dramas, film songs, talk shows with acclaimed personalities, national and international current affairs, sports, wellbeing, etc. It also telecasts ‘Special Urdu Weekly Shows’ like Mushairas & Ghazals. Besides all these, the channel produces literature related shows for Urdu lovers. Famous Poets are always invited for weekly Mushaira shows.It records several entertainment programs in studios with prominent guests on various occasions of different Indian festivals.

DD Urdu caters remarkable shows for women, in which several affluent and leading women share their individual journey towards attaining success. The channel composes many documentaries on Urdu Literature, Urdu Poets & Poetry. DD Urdu has many vibrant and informative programs on Bollywood too. DD Urdu Channel has contributed immensely to the Urdu language and has something in store for every admirer of Urdu.

== TV series ==
Name	Director	Main cast	Telecast Year	Genre	Lyricist	Writer/Creator
London Ki Ek Raat	Ravi Deep	Nissar Khan, Tom Alter, Kuldeep Dubey, Ritu Mehta	2008	Historical Drama		Sajjad Zaheer
Ek Waqt Ki Baat Hai	Dhruv Sehgal		2010	Animation	Aman Benson	Desh Premi
Sitare Zameen Par	Ved Prakash	Sameena	2010 – 2011	Talk show		
Awwal Gulookaar	Tanveer Alam	Arun Bakshi, Shravan Rathod, Muskaan Mihani, Sheeba Alam	2014	Musical Show	Tauqueer Alam	Tanveer Alam
Dabi Rooh Ka Azam	Amitabh Sinha	Muztaba Jafar, Mukta SIngh, Geeta Udeshi	2014	Family Drama	Tanveer Alam	B.R. Ishara
Shab Gazeeda	Sunil Batta		2014	Drama		Aneeza Sayed
Mujahid-E-Azadi - Ashfaqullah Khan		Gaurav Nanda	2014	Historical Drama		
Seher Hone Tak/Aashiq-e-Vatan - Maulana Azad	Lavlin Thadani	Aamir Bashir	2014	Historical Drama		
Umrao Jaan Ada	Javed Sayyed	Sudeepa Singh, Usha Bachani, Vipul Roy, Ram Awana, Kuldeep Singh	2014	Historical Drama	Mirza Hadi Ruswa	
Aangan	Javed Sayyed	Gajendra Chauhan, Ravi Yadav, Chitra Jetly, Meenakshi Rana	2018	Historical Drama	Ibrahim Ashk	Khadija Mastoor
