= Woh Humsafar Tha =

Song by Qurat-ul-Ain Balouch

from the album Humsafar
- Language: Urdu
- Genre: Theme song
- Length: 3:45
- Label: Hum TV
- Composer: Waqar Ali
- Lyricists: Naseer Turabi, Khalid Ahmad
- Producer: Momina Duraid

Woh Humsafar Tha (Urdu: وہ ہم سفر تھا, ‘Wuh ham-safar tha’ lit. He was a fellow traveller) is a song based on the ghazal written in 1971 during Bangladesh Independence War by Naseer Turabi after the Fall of Dhaka. It serves as the title song for the Pakistani drama serial Humsafar. It was originally sung by Abida Parveen and later by Qurat-ul-Ain Balouch. The latter version included additional verses taken from Khalid Ahmad's ghazal Tark-e-Tallukat.

== Background ==
The song is inspired by a ghazal written by the renowned poet Naseer Turabi in 1971, following the Fall of Dhaka, a national tragedy for Pakistan . He was profoundly affected by the separation of Pakistan and composed the ghazal with deep emotion and intensity. The lyrics of the ghazal eloquently express the poet's sorrow and heartache over the separation of the people, reflecting his personal anguish and the collective grief of the nation.

The opening verse of the song, however, is derived from Khalid Ahmad's famous ghazal, Tark-e-Talluqat, which is a widely recognized and celebrated piece of poetry in its own right.

== Production ==
It was sung by Qurat-ul-Ain Balouch and used as the title song for the Urdu drama Humsafar. The lines of the song are frequently used during the course of the show. It was composed by Waqar Ali and produced by Momina Duraid.

== Popularity ==
Upon the release of the drama Humsafar, Qurat-ul-Ain's version topped charts in Pakistan along with some other nations and received positive reviews from critics.

== Awards ==
Year	Award	Category	Result	Ref(s).
2012	Lux Style Awards	Song of the Year	Won	
2012	Lux Style Awards	Best Original Soundtrack	Won	
2012	Pakistan Media Awards	Best Singer of the Year (Female)	Won	
2013	Hum Award	Honorary Phenomenal Serial Award	Won	

== See also ==
- Humsafar
- Qurat-ul-Ain Balouch
- Naseer Turabi
- Khalid Ahmad
