= Aangan (novel) =

Urdu novel by Khadija Mastoor

- Front cover of the 2018 English version
- Author: Khadija Mastoor
- Original title: آنگن
- Translator: Neelam Hussain
- Language: Urdu
- Genre: Historical fiction; Social novel
- Set in: British India and Pakistan in the 1940s
- Publisher: Kitab Numa (Kitāb Numā)
- Publication date: 1962
- Publication place: Pakistan
- English publication date: 2000
- Media type: Print (paperback)
- Pages: 488 (first edition)
- Award: Adamjee Literary Award (1963)
- ISBN: 9693505611 (Lahore: Sang-e-Meel Publications, 1995)
- OCLC: 46849662
- Dewey Decimal: 891.439371
- LC Class: PK2200.K394 A83 1962

Aangan /ˈɑːŋɡən/ (Urdu: آنگن, romanized: Āṅgan, lit. 'courtyard'), alternatively spelled Angan, is a period novel by Pakistani novelist and short story writer Khadija Mastoor. Published in 1962, it is hailed as a masterpiece of Urdu literature. It won Mastoor the 1963 Adamjee Literary Award for Urdu prose and has been translated into 13 languages. English translations of the novel by Neelam Hussain titled The Inner Courtyard and by Daisy Rockwell as The Women's Courtyard were published in 2001 and 2018, respectively. A Pakistani TV series adaptation of the novel starring Mawra Hocane, Ahad Raza Mir, Ahsan Khan and Sajal Aly was aired on Hum TV from 2018 to 2019. Renewed interest in the novel made it the number one bestseller in the country in 2019.

== Adaptations ==
A Pakistani TV series adaptation of the novel starring Sajal Aly, Mawra Hocane, Ahad Raza Mir and Ahsan Khan was aired on Hum TV from 2018 to 2019.

In India, a show of the same name based on the novel was created by DD Urdu and aired in mid-2018.

== Reception ==
In his book "Reflections on Life and Literature" Naẓīr Ṣiddīqī opined that, "Khadija Mastoor ... has possibly surpassed all the male and female novelists, with the exception of Qurratul Ain Haider, with her first novel Aangan ... which is a rare example of artistic creation. In her perfection of art she comes close to Jane Austen."

== Legacy ==
The novel has been included in the syllabus of Allama Iqbal Open University, Islamabad and the Central Superior Services examinations.

== See also ==
- Hajira Masroor
- Pir-e-Kamil
- Shahab Nama
