= Khadija Mastoor =

Pakistani novelist and writer (1927–1982)

Khadija Mastoor خدیجہ مستور
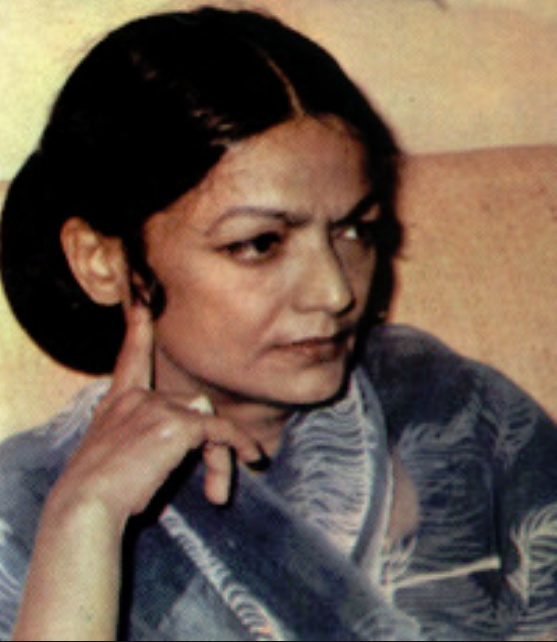
- Born: 11 December 1927; Bareilly, United Provinces of Agra and Oudh, British India
- Died: 25 July 1982 (aged 54); London, England
- Occupations: Author playwright
- Notable work: Aangan (1962); Zameen (1983)
- Spouse: Zaheer-ud-Deen Babar Awan
- Children: Kiran Fayyaz; Pervez Alam Awan
- Relatives: Hajra Masroor (sister); Khalid Ahmad (brother)
- Awards: Adamjee Literary Award

Khadija Mastoor (Urdu: خدیجہ مستور, romanized: K͟hadījah Mastūr; 11 December 1927 – 25 July 1982) was a Pakistani Urdu-language short story writer and novelist. Her 1962 novel Aangan is widely considered a literary masterpiece in Urdu literature, and has been adapted into a television drama series. Her younger sister Hajra Masroor was also a writer, while famous poet Khalid Ahmad was her younger step-brother.

== Family ==
Khadija was born on 11 December 1927 in Bareilly, British India. Her father, Tahawwur Ahmad Khan, was a doctor and a government employee. Her mother, Anwar Jahan Begum was an educated woman with a strong interest in writing, her articles were published in several women's magazines. As a result, the home environment was literary in nature. She had seven siblings – five sisters and two brothers – several of whom went on to become prominent writers, including Hajra Masroor and her step-brother, Khalid Ahmad.

== Early life ==
Khadija and her younger sister Hajra developed an interest in writing stories at a young age. Their stories began to be published in children's magazines of the time, which motivated her to continue. As she grew older, her stories were featured in prominent literary magazines such as Saqi, Adabi Duniya, and Aam-Gir, helping her establish a unique identity.

At a young age, Khadija's father died, leading to difficulties in the household. Her mother later married Mohammad Mustafa Khan, with whom she had one son, Khalid Ahmad. After the creation of Pakistan, her mother and siblings moved to Lahore. During this time, they received immense support from Ahmad Nadeem Qasmi.

== Literary career ==
Khadija started writing short stories in 1942 and continued writing till her death. Five collections of her short stories and two novels have been published. Her stories were based on social and moral values as well as political. Her writings were based on experience and observation.

=== Aangan (1962) ===
Khadija's novel Aangan is regarded as one of the finest novels in Urdu and became her defining work. In 1963, she received the prestigious Adamjee Literary Award for her novel. The novel was translated into English by Neelam Hussain under the title The Inner Courtyard in 2001, and by Daisy Rockwell as The Women's Courtyard in 2018. It has been recognized as a classic by Penguin Books and translated into 13 languages.

A Pakistani television series based on the novel, featuring Mawra Hocane, Ahad Raza Mir, Ahsan Khan, and Sajal Aly, aired on Hum TV from 2018 to 2019. The adaptation sparked a renewed interest in the novel, leading it to become the bestseller of Pakistan in 2019.

== Bibliography ==
=== Short-story collections ===
- Khail (1944)
- Bochaar (1946)
- Chand Roz Aur (1951)
- Thake Haare (1962)
- Thanda Mitha Pani (1981) (winner of Hijra Award)

=== Novels ===
- Aangan (1962) (winner of Adamjee Literary Award in 1963)
- Zameen (1983)

== Personal life ==
In 1950, she married Qasmi's nephew Zaheer Babar Awan, who was a renowned journalist. She had a successful marriage and continued contributing to Urdu literature. They had two children, Kiran Fayyaz and Pervez Alam Awan.

== Death and legacy ==
Khadija Mastoor died aged 54 on 25 July 1982 in London, England, and was buried in Lahore, Pakistan.

In 2005, an event at the Karachi Arts Council was attended by Khadija's sister, Hajra Masroor, as the chief guest. The event, presided over by scholar Sahar Ansari, highlighted how both sisters developed unique writing styles. Ansari noted that Khadija Mastoor wrote based on her personal experiences.

== Screen adaptations ==
Title	Year	Notes
Ab Tum Ja Saktey Ho	1996	Based on a short story
Khirman	–	PTV long play
Aangan	2014	Based on Aangan (novel)
Aangan	2018–19	Based on Aangan (novel)

== See also ==
- List of Pakistani writers
- List of Urdu language writers
- List of people from Lahore
