= Massoud =

- Gender: masculine
- Languages: Arabic: مسعود اِقرا:مَس عَود, Persian: مسعود خوانده شود:مسود

Origin
- Meaning: fortunate, prosperous, lucky, happy

Other names
- Alternative spelling: Masoud, Masud, Massoude, Massudeh, Masood, Masʽud, Masud, Mashud, Messaoud, Mesut, Mesud, Mosād

Massoud (Arabic: مسعود اِقرا:مَس عَود, romanized: fortunate, prosperous, lucky, happy, Persian: مسعود خوانده شود:مسود) is a given name and a surname, commonly found in the Middle East and Asia. It has a variety of spellings including Masoud, Masud, Massoude, Massudeh, Masood, Masʽud, Masud, Mashud, Messaoud, Mesut, Mesud, or Mosād. People with the name Massoud include:

== People with the given name Massoud ==
- Massoud Abdelhafid, Libyan retired army general
- Massoud Achkar (1956–2021), Lebanese politician
- Massoud Amin (born 1961), American professor of engineering
- Massoud Behnoud, Iranian journalist
- Massoud Borazani, 1st president of Iraqi Kurdistan
- Massoud Hamid, Kurdish Syrian photographer
- Massoud Hossaini (born 1981), Afghan-born photojournalist
- Massoud Keshmiri, Iranian militant and undercover politician
- Massoud Khalili (born 1950), Afghan diplomat
- Massoud Nawabi (1954–2010), Afghan poet/writer
- Massoud Pedram, Iranian American computer engineer
- Massoud Rajavi, Iranian militant politician
- Massoud Shafiee, Iranian lawyer

== People with the surname Massoud ==
- Ahmad Massoud (born 1989), Afghan leader
- Ahmad Shah Massoud (1953–2001), Afghan military leader
- Ahmad Wali Massoud (born 1964), Afghan politician
- Ahmad Zia Massoud (born 1956), Afghan politician
- Donia Massoud (born 1979), Egyptian actress and singer
- Ghassan Massoud (born 1958), Syrian actor and filmmaker
- Mena Massoud (born 1991), Egyptian-born Canadian actor
- Moez Massoud, Egyptian scholar
- Shahir Massoud, Canadian chef and television personality
