= Ahmaq Phaphoondvi =

Indian Urdu writer and freedom fighter

- احمق پھپھوندوی
- Born: Mohammad Mustafa Khan; 26 April 1895; Phaphund, Farrukhabad, British India
- Died: 8 August 1957; Phaphund, Uttar Pradesh, India
- Other names: Ahmaq, Maddah
- Known for: Resistance to the British Government, Linguist, Satirical-Poetry
- Political party: Indian National Congress
- Movement: Indian Independence Movement
- Children: Khalid Ahmad

Ahmaq Phaphoondvi (1895-1957) was the alias of Mohammad Mustafa Khan, an Indian Urdu poet, linguist, and freedom fighter. He is known for his contributions to literature, especially his satirical ghazals targeting the British Government of India. Phaphoondvi spent many years in the Aligarh jail for his active participation in the struggle for independence, including the Swaraj Movement and his association with the Indian National Congress.

== Early life and career ==
Ahmaq Phaphoondvi was born as Mohammad Mustafa Khan into a knowledgeable and respected Pashtun family from the Yousafzai tribe, Ahmaq's ancestors had migrated to the Farrukhabad district during the Mughal rule. After his grandfather was hanged for his role in the Indian Rebellion of 1857 against the British Raj, his father relocated to Phaphund.

His father established a successful publishing press in 1862, which operated until 1921, when Ahmaq was jailed. Afterward, the press declined and eventually ceased. After the death of his father in 1912, he went to Madrassa-ul-Uloom in Budaun to learn Arabic. Following this he went to the Tibbia College in Delhi, where he studied medicine for two and a half years.

== Resistance and work ==
=== Poetry and jail ===
From a young age, he demonstrated exceptional talent and became a remarkable poet. In 1919 he was inspired by the Indian National Congress's work and joined their cause, as a result he was jailed by the government in 1921. However, he continued to write from his cell in the Aligarh Jail. His ghazals have been compiled into several books, to name a few: Sang-o-Khisht, Naksh-i-Hikmat and the well-known Josh-o-Amal. An example of his poetry includes:

"Look at the turmoil and the bloodshed among our people, The cleverness of the English mind is used up in all such schemes, this murder and mayhem, wars and battles, cruelties and malice, The country’s garden is barren, with nothing but dust and desolation" (Extract from: 'The cleverness of the English Mind', Original title: 'Angrezi Zehn Ki Tezi')

=== Linguist ===
Ahmaq or Mustafa, was well versed in multiple languages, including: Urdu, Hindi, Arabic, Sanskrit, Pali, Persian and Turkish. He had previously compiled several dictionaries, including Pali-Urdu, Sanskrit-Urdu, Persian-Urdu.

In 1950, his former cellmate, Shri Narayan Prasad, suggested that he write an Urdu-Hindi dictionary, recognizing that many historical documents at the time were in Persian and Urdu and needed to be translated into Hindi. It took him three and a half year to compile this dictionary. It was published by the Uttar Pradesh Government and in service of the Chief Minister Sampurnanand. The dictionary is still published and used in India.

== Death ==
Ahmaq died on 8 August 1957, leaving behind a legacy of resistance, literary contributions, and dedication to independence. The poet Khalid Ahmad was his son, born to his second wife, Anwar Jahan Begum, who migrated to Pakistan in 1947.
