= Masood Mufti =

Pakistani writer (1934 - 2020)

- Born: 10 June 1934; Gujrat, British India
- Died: 10 November 2020 (aged 86); Islamabad, Pakistan
- Occupations: Civil servant, bureaucrat, writer, newspaper columnist
- Awards: Pride of Performance (2010)

Masood Mufti (Urdu: مسعود مفتی; 10 June 1934 – 10 November 2020) was a Pakistani scholar of Urdu language, short story writer, novelist, dramatist, columnist and a civil servant.

== Early life and education ==
Masood Mufti was born in Gujrat, Pakistan on 10 June 1934. He passed his matriculation exam in 1947 and earned his Master's degree in English literature from the Government College, Lahore.

In 1956, he obtained a diploma in public administration from St Catherine's College, the University of Cambridge, followed by a diploma in journalism in 1960.

== Career ==
Masood Mufti was a member of the Civil Service of Pakistan (CSP) from 1958 to 1994 and retired as Additional Secretary to the Government of Pakistan in grade BPS-21. He served as Secretary to the Government of East Pakistan, Education department at Dhaka. After the inception of Bangladesh, he was held by India as a prisoner of war for almost two years. His witness to this national tragedy became the topic of his several books, including Lamhe (1978), his diary.

He was serving as Joint Secretary to the Government of Pakistan in the Economic Affairs Division (EAD) when General Zia-ul-Haq imposed martial law in 1977. In protest, he quit the federal government and went on deputation to serve at the Asian Development Bank (ADB). He spoke against the feudal-army axis in Pakistan's democratic decay. He went on to form the first public library in Loralai district where he served as district magistrate. He also served as the deputy commissioner of Larkana, and the commissioner of Lahore.

During the period of 1994 – 2009, he wrote newspaper articles in English and Urdu for the Pakistani press, as well as wrote books on the subjects of politics and science.

== Literary works ==
Masood Mufti published thirteen books. He wrote books on the subjects of politics, science, and history.

Mufti's works include:

Book	Genre
Chehray	reportage
Do Meenar (2020)	history
Chehray and Mohray	reportage
Rag-e-sang	stories
Rezay	stories
Lamhay (1978)	diary
Mohaddab Sheesha	stories
Ham nafas	reportage
Khiloney	novel
Tikone	plays
Salgirah	stories
Sar-e-rahey	humour
Tauba	stories
Jharnon se kirnain	memoirs

== Awards and recognition ==
- Pride of Performance Award in literature by the President of Pakistan in 2010.

== Death ==
Masood Mufti died on 10 November 2020 of cardiac arrest in Islamabad, Pakistan aged 86. He was buried in Islamabad. Among the noted Pakistani writers that attended his funeral were two former chairmen of Pakistan Academy of Letters, Iftikhar Arif, Muhammad Qasim Bughio and many other writers.

== Bibliography ==
- Husain, Maqsudah (2004). Masʻūd Muftī: shak̲h̲ṣiyat va fan. Rawalpandi: Nawab and Sons Publications. OCLC 86108850.
