= Quratulain Balouch =

Musical artist

Qurat-ul-Ain Balouch قرۃ العین بلوچ
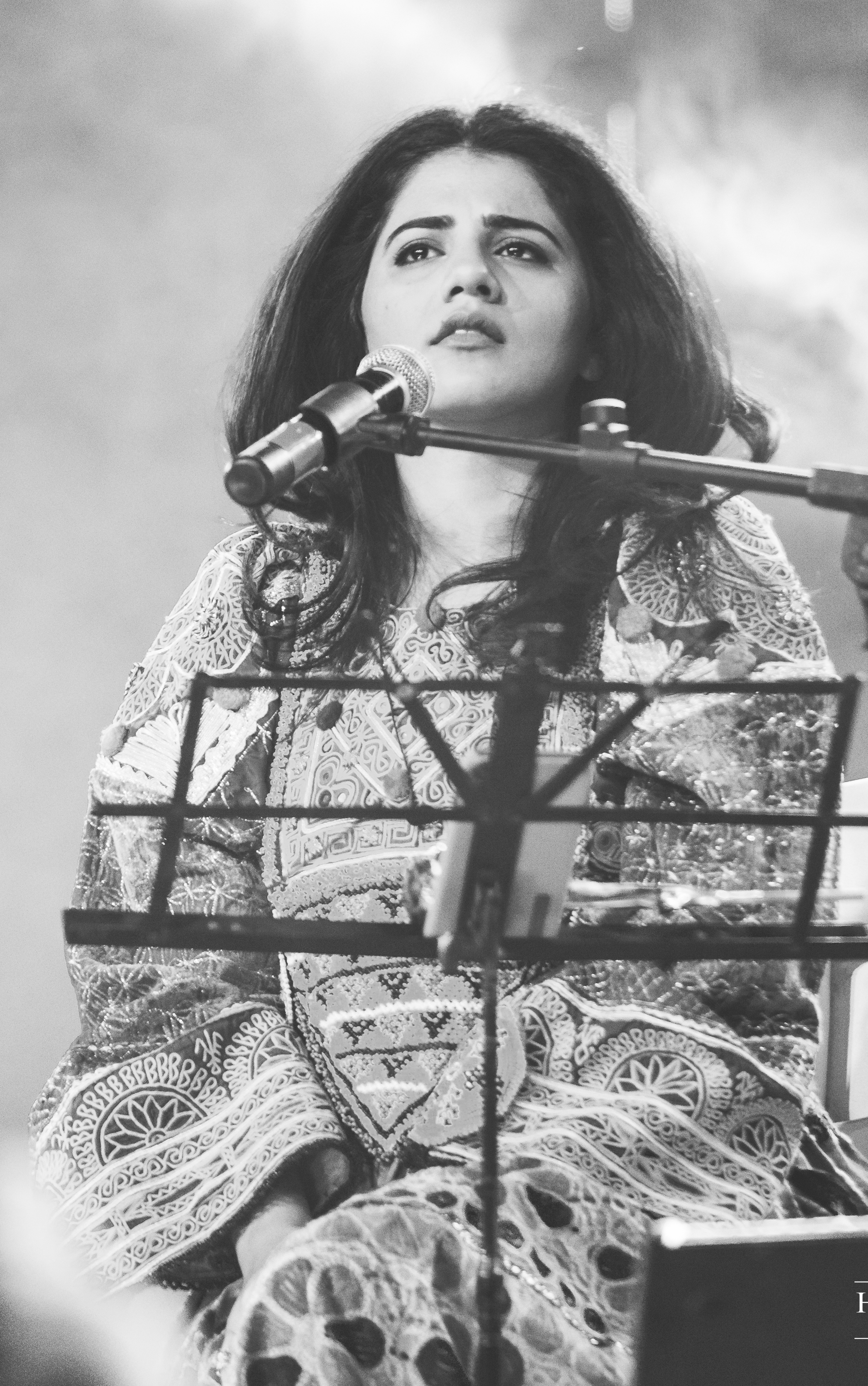
- Qurat-ul-Ain Balouch in 2016

Background information
- Also known as: QB
- Genres: Pop; Rock; Folk; Classical; Sufi
- Occupation: Singer-songwriter
- Instrument: Vocals
- Years active: 2011–present
- Label: Coke Studio Pakistan

Quratulain Balouch (Urdu: قرۃ العین بلوچ) is a Pakistani American singer-songwriter. Also known as QB or the Humsafar Girl, she became popular for her title track "Woh Humsafar Tha" in Hum TV's serial Humsafar.

== Early life ==
Balouch was originally named "Shaheera" but later renamed "Quratulain" at two years old. She grew up in Pakistan and moved to the United States when she was around 18.

She returned to Pakistan five years later in 2011 where she became involved with working at an NGO that did relief work in Khyber Pakhtunkhwa and Azad Kashmir. While working at the NGO, she met members of the music industry, who noticed her talent during an impromptu performance. She was encouraged to post her music on YouTube, which kickstarted her music career.

Balouch stated that while she had had a connection with music growing up, she never considered pursuing it as a career in her youth, and the path emerged through fortunate opportunities. She has shared that her family was unhappy about her career path, but later came "to terms with the fact that I was born to sing."

== Career ==
Balouch has no formal music education. She grew up listening to Nusrat Fateh Ali Khan, Muhammad Juman, Pathanay Khan and others.

Her singing career started with her cover of Reshma's "Ankhian Nu Ren De" in 2011. She came into the limelight when she featured alongside Jal in the song "Panchi" as part of season 4 of Coke Studio. She rose to fame after her award-winning performance of "Woh Humsafar Tha" for 2011 drama serial Humsafar.

In 2012, she represented her country in a live performance with the BBC Philharmonic Orchestra. In 2016, she made her debut in Bollywood with song "Kaari Kaari" in film Pink.

== Personal life ==
Balouch has shared her love of Sufism as both the answer to her spiritual questions and the inspiration for her music.

In the past, Balouch has expressed that feminism requires action over “shouting for ‘rights’” causing her to garner backlash and criticism before clarifying she appreciates women who “work everyday towards what they believe in.”

Balouch has stated she dislikes being referred to as QB, due to sharing the initials Qandeel Baloch, clarifying she respects her as a “reflection of the society.. speaking her truth.”

On 5 September 2025, Balouch was injured by a bear attack while camping in Gilgit Baltistan, on a trip to assist victims of the 2025 Pakistan floods. She describes the incident, along with a car accident she was in, as making her “stronger, more resilient, and less fearful,” seeing her survival as a second chance at life that have motivated her to keep going.

== Discography ==
=== Coke Studio Pakistan ===
Year	Season	Song	Co-singer(s)	Ref.
2011	4	"Panchi"	Jal	
2015	8	"Sohni Dharti"	Season's ft. artistes	
2015	8	"Sammi Meri Waar"	Umair Jaswal	
2016	9	"Aye Rah-e-Haq Ke Shaheedo"	Season's ft. artistes	
2016	9	"Baliye (Laung Gawacha)"	Haroon Shahid	
2016	9	"Sab Jag Soye"	Shuja Haider	
2017	10	"Qaumi Taranah"	Season's ft. artistes	
2017	10	"Faasle"	Kaavish	
2017	10	"Laal Meri Pat"	Akbar Ali and Arieb Azhar	
2017	10	"Dekh Tera Kya/Latthay Di Chaadar"	Farhan Saeed	
2019	12	"Mundiya"	Ali Sethi	
2022	14	"Thagyan"	Zain Zohaib	

=== Soundtracks ===
Year	Song	Drama	Network	Notes	Ref(s)
2011	"Woh Humsafar Tha"	Humsafar	Hum TV		
2012	"Roshan Sitara"	Roshan Sitara	Hum TV		
2012	"Behkawa"	Behkawa	Geo Entertainment		
2013	"Naina Tere"	Mera Pehla Pyar	ARY Digital	Co-singer Shiraz Uppal	
2015	"Aey Zindagi"	Aey Zindagi	Hum TV		
2016	"Tere Nal Main Layian"	Mann Mayal	Hum TV	Hum TV	
2016	"Judaai"	Judaai	ARY Digital		
2016	"Kaari Kaari"	Pink		Hindi film Debut	
2017	"Morey Saiyaan"	Moray Saiyan	ARY Digital	Co-singer Uzair Jaswal	
2023	"Jannat Sa Aggay"	Jannat Se Aagay	Geo Entertainment		
2023	"Khushbo Mein Basay Khat"	Khushbo Mein Basay Khat	Hum TV		
2024	"Gila Hai Kiya Tera"	Qarz-e-Jaan	Hum TV		

=== Others ===
Year	Song	Note
2011	"Ankhian Nu Ren De"	Cover
2012	"Mae Ni"	Cover
2012	"Dekha Na Tha"	
2013	"Uss Paar"	music video
2013	"Mera Ishq"	music video
2014	"Peera"	co-singer Khawar Jawad
2014	"Koi Labda"	Punjabi song
2014	"Every Teardrop is a Waterfall"	English song
2015	"Bewafaiyan"	Single
2016	"Saaiyaan"	Single
2016	"Mere Maula"	Tribute to Amjad Sabri, sung with Ali Zafar and Ali Sethi
2016	"Pyar Wyar"	music video from Cornetto Pop Rock (season 1); co-singers Noori
2017	"Chal Diye"	music video from Cornetto Pop Rock (season 2); co-singer Ali Azmat
2018	"COLORS"	co-singer Jason Derulo
2018	"Dil Karda Ay / Agar Tum Mil Jao"	co-singer Ali Sethi
2018	"Tak Meday Sona"	co-singer Soch

== Awards and nominations ==
Year	Nominee / work	Award	Result
Lux Style Awards
2012	"Woh Humsafar Tha" – Humsafar	Song of the Year	Won
2012	"Woh Humsafar Tha" – Humsafar	Best Original Soundtrack	Won
2017	"Saaiyaan"	Song of the Year	Won
2017	"Tere Naal Mein Laiyan" – Mann Mayal	Best Original Soundtrack	Won
2018	"Chal Diye" – #CornettoPopRock2	Song of the Year (shared with Ali Azmat)	Nominated
Pakistan Media Awards
2012	"Woh Humsafar Tha" – Humsafar	Singer of the Year (Female)	Won
Hum Awards
2013	"Woh Humsafar Tha" – Humsafar	Hum Honorary Phenomenal Serial Award	Won
2013	"Roshan Sitara" – Roshan Sitara	Hum Award for Best Original Soundtrack	Nominated
Achievement Award
2011	"Woh Humsafar Tha" – Humsafar	Pakistan's Youngest Achievement Award	Won
Filmfare Awards
2017	"Kaari Kaari" – Pink	Filmfare Award for Best Female Playback Singer	Nominated
Mirchi Music Awards
2016	"Kaari Kaari" – Pink	Female Vocalist of The Year	Nominated
2016	"Kaari Kaari" – Pink	Upcoming Female Vocalist of The Year	Nominated
International Pakistan Prestige Awards
2017	"Tere Naal Mein Laiyan" – Mann Mayal	Best Singer	
