= Aakhri Station (film) =

- Directed by: Suroor Barabankvi
- Screenplay by: Suroor Barabankvi
- Based on: Pagli by Hajra Masroor
- Produced by: Suroor Barabankvi
- Starring: Rani; Haroon; Shabnam
- Music by: Khan Ataur Rahman
- Release date: 1965 (Pakistan)
- Country: Pakistan
- Language: Urdu

Aakhri Station (transl. The Last Station) is a 1965 Pakistani Urdu film based on short story Pagli by feminist Urdu literature writer Hajra Masroor while screenplay is written by Suroor Barabankvi. Directed and produced by Barabankvi also, the film stars Haroon and Rani in lead roles along with Shabnam in supporting role.

Aakhri Station is a prime example of film making of East Pakistan: literary and socially conscious. The story of the film revolves around the romance of Fozia, station master's daughter and Jameel, an honest engineer surrounded by corrupt contractors. Shabnam's performance in the film was praised and is regarded as one of her career's best. The film was included in the list of "10 Best Films of Pakistani cinema" by BBC Urdu.

== Plot ==
Jamil, a young engineer comes to East Pakistan where he joins the railway department. On station, there is an intellectually disabled girl who often wanders there. It comes across to Jamil that there is a backstory behind her intellectual disability. Some time before, her marriage was called off because her father could not fulfill the groom's demand of huge dowry. Her father died in result and caused her mental state to decline.

== Cast ==
- Rani
- Haroon
- Shabnam
- Shaukat Akbar
- Jalil Afghani
- Mushtaq
- Aziz
- Sattar
- Abdur Razzak as Mushtaq, assistant of station master

== Awards and nominations ==
Year	Award	Category	Awardee	Result	Ref.
—N/a	Nigar Awards	Best Scriptwriter	Hajra Masroor	Won	
—N/a	Nigar Awards	Best Supporting Actress	Shabnam	Won	
