= Masud Alioghlu =

- Native name: Masud Alioghlu
- Born: October 5, 1928; Mahmudlu, Qubadli District, Azerbaijan SSR, Soviet Union
- Died: June 23, 1973 (aged 44); Baku, Azerbaijan SSR, Soviet Union
- Occupation: Writer
- Language: Azerbaijani
- Citizenship: Soviet Union
- Education: Baku State University

Masud Alioghlu Valiyev (October 5, 1928, Mahmudlu, Gubadly District – June 23, 1973, Baku), was an Azerbaijani writer. Doctor of Philology.

== Biography ==
Masud Alioghlu was born on October 5, 1928, in Mahmudlu village, Gubadly District. He is the son of Ali Valiyev, the People's Writer, and the father of Afag Masud, the writer.

In 1946, he gained admission into the Philological faculty of Azerbaijan State University. After graduating from the university, he started his scientific activity at the Institute of Literature named after Nizami of the Azerbaijan National Academy of Sciences (ANAS). At the age of 27, he was awarded the academic degree of candidate of philological sciences for his scientific research work entitled “Civil War Theme in Our Prose”, and at the age of 40, he was awarded the scientific degree of a Doctor of Philology for his scientific research work on the topic “Ways of Development of Azerbaijani Soviet Prose.”

He is the author of about 100 articles, monographs on the literary creativity of such writers as Nizami, Fuzuli, M.F. Akhundov, N. Vazirov, S.S. Akhundov, A. Hagverdiyev, J. Mammadguluzade, M.A. Sabir, M. Hadi, H. Javid, Y.V. Chamanzaminli, Sheikh Mohammad Khiabani, Shahriyar, just to name a few. Furthermore, M. Alioghlu is the author of valuable books that illuminate the landscape of the contemporary literature of his time.

He is the author of the first series of articles and the fundamental “Huseyn Javid” monograph which gave literary justification to Huseyn Javid whose works were banned during the Soviet era.

Masud Alioghlu died in Baku on June 23, 1973, when he was only 44.

== Works ==
- J. Mammadguluzade's Dramaturgy – Azerneshr, 1954
- S.S. Akhundov – Azerneshr, 1956
- Ideological Friends – Azerneshr, 1961
- Rasul Rza – Azerneshr, 1960
- A New Person in Literature – Azerneshr, 1964
- Ideological Brothers – Azerneshr, 1966
- The Critic's Thoughts – Azerneshr, 1968
- Literary Fragments – Azerneshr, 1974
- H. Javid's Romanticism – Azerneshr, 1975
- Aim and Art – Yazichy, 1980
- Love and Heroism – Yazichy, 1979
- The Bored People (In Two Volumes) – Elm and Tehsil, 2009
- The Bored People (Selected Works) – Baku, Tehsil, 2018, 792 pages ISBN 978-9952-518-05-4
