= Masud Naraghi =

Iranian-American nuclear physicist

Masud Naraghi (died 2020) was an Iranian-born nuclear physicist and engineer. In the early 1970s, he was appointed by the Shah of Iran to lead the newly formed Atomic Energy Organization of Iran (AEOI) in Tehran. Specifically, Naraghi led the research and procurement efforts centered at the Tehran Nuclear Research Center.

According to Der Spiegel, in 1987, as the head of Iran's nuclear energy commission, Naraghi was part of a secret delegation that met with associates of A.Q. Khan in Zurich. In this meeting, he negotiated for the technical foundations of a uranium enrichment program.

In the aftermath of the Iranian Revolution, he immigrated to the United States. He was president of Torr International, a nanotechnology company headquartered in New Windsor, New York.
