= Masood Ahmad Azizi =

Afghan politician

Masood Ahmad Azizi مسعود عزیزی
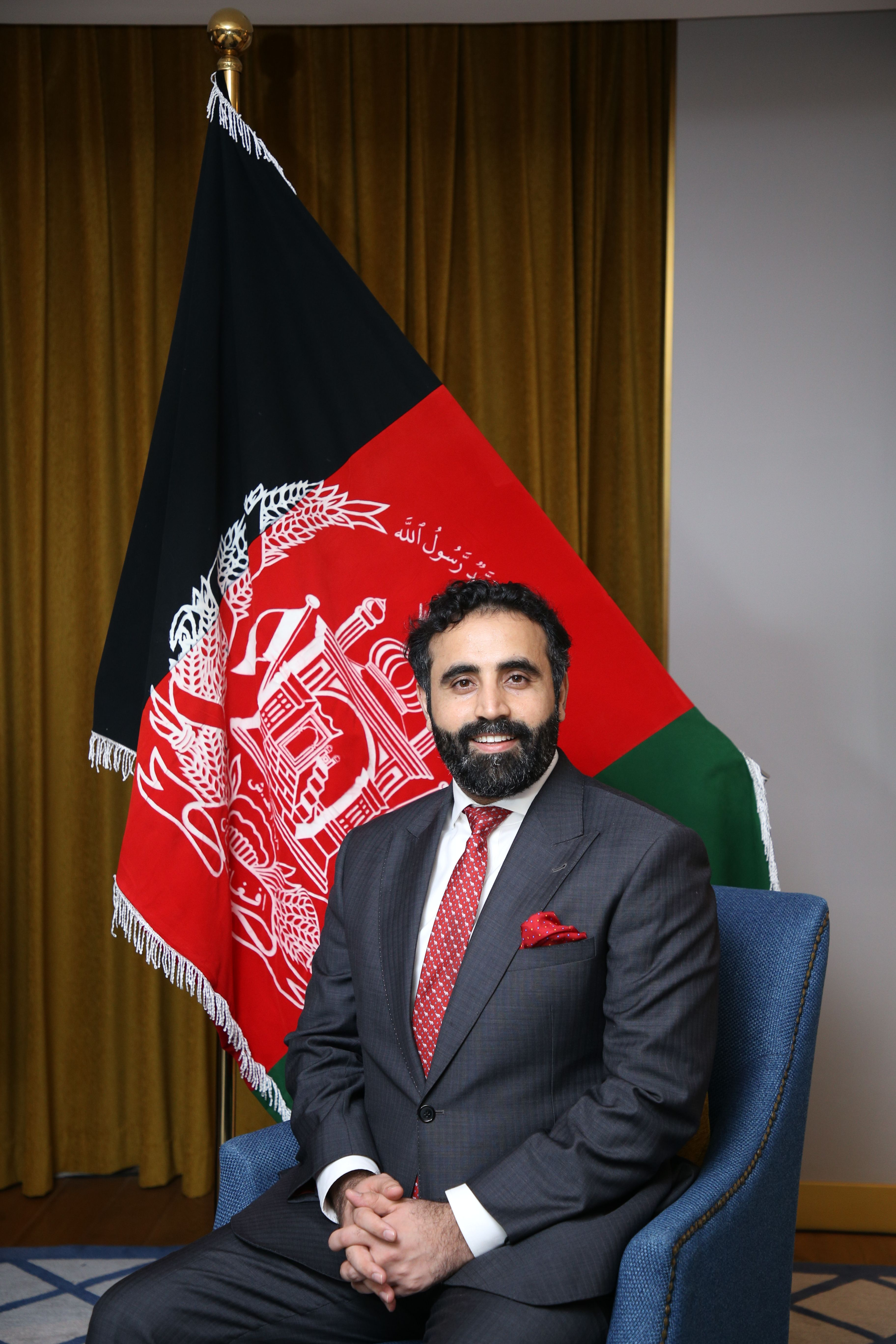
- Afghan Consul General Masood Ahmad Azizi in Dubai

Consul General
- In office 2020–2023

Personal details
- Born: 4 June 1983 (age 43) Kandahar, southern province of Afghanistan
- Education: University of Warwick

Military service
- Allegiance: Afghanistan
- Branch/service: Afghan Foreign Ministry
- Rank: Major General

Major General Masood Ahmad Azizi (Pashto: مسعود عزیزی; born 1983) is an Afghan politician and is a former Consul General of Afghanistan in Dubai & Northern Emirates in the UAE. Prior to that he was Deputy Interior Minister for Policy and Strategy. Azizi previously served as the Chief of Staff of the Governor of Nangarhar and Kandahar.

== Early life ==
Masood Ahmad Azizi was born on 4 June 1983 in Kandahar Province, into a family of relative affluence, son to a political and tribal leader Abdul Aziz Khan. He became involved in politics as the Special Assistant to the Governor of Kandahar.

== Political career ==
Prior to his diplomatic career, Masood Ahmad Azizi became Deputy Minister of Policy and Strategy in the Ministry of Interior and brigadier general in December 2013. President Karzai issued Azizi a second star to Major General Azizi for his accomplishments in the honor of his Nation.

Azizi chaired positions within Afghanistan ranging from the Special Assistant to a Governor to being the Chief of Staff of Nangarhar. As Chief of Staff of Nangarhar, he identified three key issues. The first was the high poppy cultivation rate in Nangarhar, the second was the need to implement infrastructure concerning the rule of law, and the third was to reduce the gap between the local community and government.

Two significant programs that were substantial national and international talking points were the disarmament of illegal groups while simultaneously informing, educating and interacting with the local populace to keep the public informed every step of the way. For his “commitment, dedication and personal risk for Afghanistan” he was awarded the Hero Medal “Ghazi Meer Masjidi Khan Medal”.

== Education ==
Azizi was educated at an independent school during his migration in Pakistan. He holds a Bachelor in Law and a Master in International Relations the University of Warwick. He has attended courses and workshops relevant to his past and prior work in Afghanistan and in developed countries, a prime example being recently attended courses on “Leadership and Local Governance, Media and Management, Strategic Studies and Post-Conflict studies”.

MG. Azizi wrote his Master's thesis on “Tribalism in Afghanistan”. He has performed hours of interviews, lectures, and research concerning the effects of international policies related to Afghanistan.

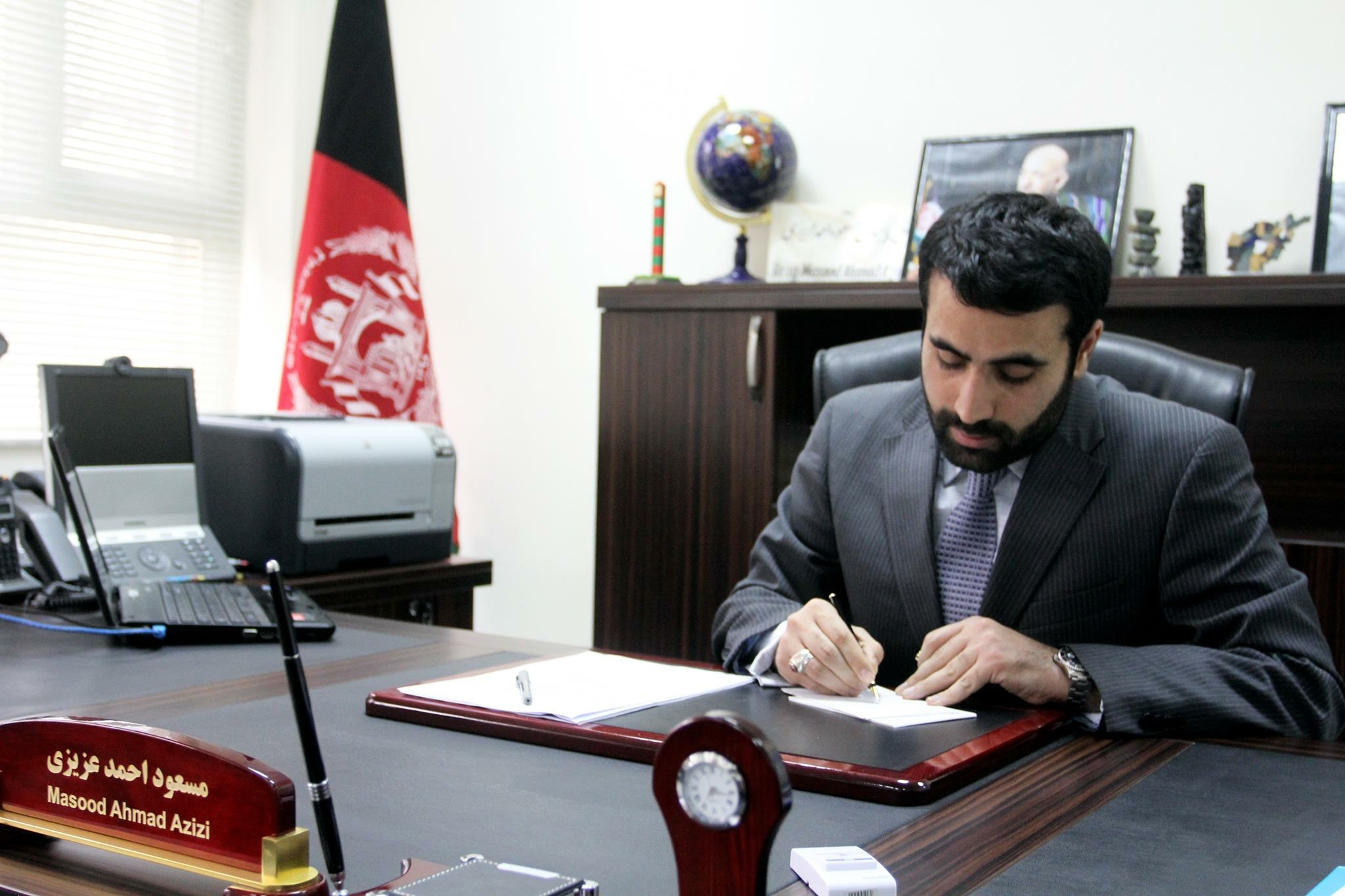
Azizi in 2013

He is fluent in Pashto, Dari, Urdu and English.
