= Hajra Masroor =

Pakistani writer (1930–2012)

Hajra Masroor ہاجرہ مسرور
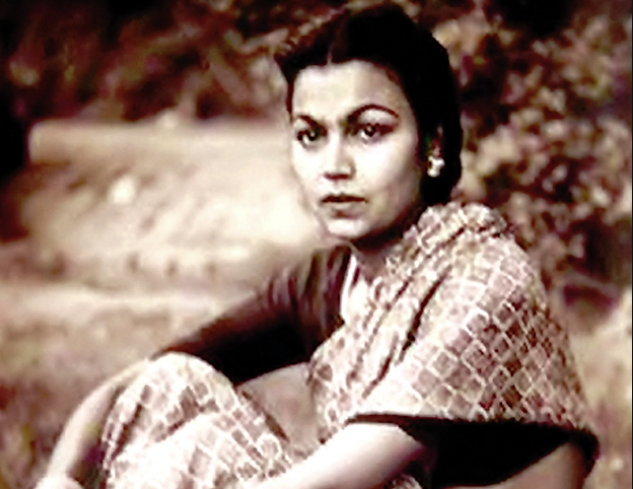
- Born: 17 January 1930; Lucknow, British India
- Died: 15 September 2012 (aged 82); Karachi, Pakistan
- Occupation: Writer
- Known for: Feminist writer Progressive Writers' Movement
- Relatives: Khadija Mastoor (sister); Khalid Ahmad (brother)
- Awards: Pride of Performance Award in 1995 by the President of Pakistan

Hajra Masroor (Urdu: ہاجرہ مسرور; Hājrah Masrūr; 17 January 1930 – 15 September 2012) was a Pakistani writer who established herself with her short fiction stories, known as afsana in Urdu literature. Her elder sister, Khadija Mastoor, was also an accomplished short-story writer and novelist.

== Personal life ==
Hajra Masroor was born on 17 January 1930 in Lucknow, British India to Dr. Tahawwar Ahmad Khan, who was a British Army medical doctor, and Anwar Jahan Begum, a published writer. Her father had suddenly died after a heart attack at the young age of 38. She had five sisters, including Khadija Mastoor, and a younger brother, Khalid Ahmad, who also became a poet, playwright and newspaper columnist. Her family was mainly raised by her mother. She began writing from her early childhood.

After independence of Pakistan in 1947, she and her sisters migrated to Pakistan, and settled in Lahore. According to an account by an Urdu writer in his book, few knew that Hajra was once engaged to famous Urdu poet Sahir Ludhianvi. Ludhianvi mispronounced a word at a literary gathering. When Hajra pointed that out, he got angry and the engagement was broken off. Later, she married Ahmad Ali Khan, who was the editor of daily Dawn for 28 years. They were married for 57 years before he died in 2007. They have two daughters.

== Career ==
Hajra Masroor began writing short stories from an early age. Her short stories published in the literary magazines had received high appreciation from Urdu literary circles. She edited literary magazine Naqoosh with Ahmad Nadeem Qasmi. Qasmi was also a friend of hers and her sister. She made her place in the history of Urdu literature and Urdu fiction with bold imagination and writing of short stories in a non-traditional way. She wrote simple yet effective prose, had a down-to-earth style of writing. Her early collections of short stories included Chirkey (1944), Hai Allah, and Chori Chuppay. Her collected plays were published as Woh Log. She also wrote the script of Suroor Barabankvi’s film Aakhri Station.

She wrote several books of short stories in which she raised the social, political, legal, and economic rights for women equal to those of men. Hajra Masroor was one of the torchbearer of the Progressive Writers' Movement as well as one of the pioneers of feminism in the subcontinent.

== Death and legacy ==
Hajira Masroor died on 15 September 2012 in Karachi, Pakistan.

== Bibliography ==
Short stories

- Chand Ke Doosri Taraf چاند کی دوسری طرف
- Tisri Manzil تیسری منزل
- Andhere Ujale اند ھیرے اُجالے
- Choori Chupe چوری چُھپے
- Ha-ai Allah ہائے اللہ
- Charkhay چرکے
- Woe Log وہ لوگ
- Charagh Ki Lau Per چراغ کی لو پر
- Sargoshian سرگوشیان

== Awards and recognition ==
- Pride of Performance Award in 1995 by the President of Pakistan
- Aalmi Frogh-e-Urdu Adab Award.

| Year | Ceremony | Work | Award | Ref. |
|---|---|---|---|---|
| 1965 | Nigar Awards | Aakhri Station | Best Scriptwriter | |

== See also ==
- List of Pakistani writers
- List of Urdu language writers
- List of people from Lahore
