= Taazi =

Defunct Pakistani website and smartphone application focusing on music

- Taazi music on Android
- Company type: Privately held company
- Dissolved: 2020
- Headquarters: Islamabad, {{{location_country}}}
- Area served: Worldwide
- Key people: Haroon (CEO & Founder)
- Website: taazi.com
- Launched: August 2015; 11 years ago

Taazi (Urdu: تازی) was a Pakistani website and smartphone application that focused on music. It was an online music streaming service and a digital distributor of Lollywood, Coke Studio and other regional Pakistani music across the world. Taazi described itself as a platform to combat piracy and gave local musicians a medium to monetize their music through its unique billing system. Taazi featured content of both established and upcoming musicians. Taazi.com was discontinued in 2020.

== History ==
Taazi was created, over a 3-year period, by a team of programmers and musicians based in Islamabad. Taazi was founded and run by producer, director and musician Haroon. Taazi was a division of Unicorn Black, a media production and technology company that develops and produces original content. Haroon is also the creator and director of the Pakistani animated TV series Burka Avenger.

== About Taazi ==
Taazi was Pakistan's first legal music app and website. Taazi had more than 100,000 songs and more than 2,500 enlisted artists.

The Taazi app had more than 100,000 downloads. Users living in Pakistan as well as abroad could have downloaded content by paying through mobile credit and PayPal. 70% of the revenue generated was given to the artists whereas 30% was retained by Taazi. Taazi was a platform that connected users with artists. Artists uploaded their content and subscribers downloaded content legally.

== Content acquisition ==
Taazi worked as a distribution platform. All content on Taazi was uploaded legally. Agreements were in place for the most popular Pakistani music content including the following:

- Coke Studio Seasons 1–8
- Nescafe Basement Hits
- EMI Pakistan
- Digital Entertainment World
- Multiple independent record labels having access to thousands of Pakistani songs
