= Naseer Turabi =

Pakistani poet (1945–2021)

Naseer Turabi نصير ترابی
- Born: 15 June 1945; Hyderabad, Hyderabad Deccan, British India
- Died: January 10, 2021 (aged 75); Karachi, Sindh, Pakistan
- Resting place: Wadi-a-Hussain graveyard
- Education: Masters in Public Relations, University of Karachi
- Occupation: Poet
- Awards: Allama Iqbal Award for Urdu poetry by the Pakistan Academy of Letters in 2020

Naseer Turabi (Urdu: نصير ترابی; 15 June 1945 – 10 January 2021) was a Pakistani Urdu language poet.

Playback singer Ahmed Rushdi played a significant role in Turabi's success and helped popularize his ghazals.

== Early life and career ==
Naseer Turabi was born in Hyderabad Deccan on 15 June 1945. His father, Allama Rasheed Turabi, was a religious scholar.

Turabi came to Pakistan with his family after the independence of Pakistan in 1947 and settled in Karachi. He finished his basic education in 1962 and received his M.A. in Mass Communications from University of Karachi in 1968.

Turabi was friends with fellow poets Faiz Ahmed Faiz, Nasir Kazmi, and Mustafa Zaidi.

He began writing poetry in 1962. His first collection of poetry, Aks-e-Faryadi, was published in 2000. He wrote two other books: Laaraib and Sheyriaat.

Pakistani singer Abida Parveen provided vocal rendering for his poem Woh hamsafar tha. This ghazal was written in response to the fall of Dhaka. It was later used as a theme song for the TV drama series Humsafar (2011).

He also wrote lyrics for the theme song "Dil Ka Jo Mol Chukatay Honge" of Mol and Zindagi Gulzar Hai drama series. He has also written lyrics of Dil Aitebaar for Khwab Saraye and for Yaqeen Ka Safar OST.

== Death ==
Naseer Turabi died in Karachi on January 10, 2021, at age 75 due to a heart attack and respiratory issues. He was interred at the Wadi-e-Hussain graveyard in Karachi where his friend, Mustafa Zaidi is also buried.

== Accomplishments ==
- Executive Member - Pakistan Writers Guild, Sindh (1978–83)
- Member Syndicate - Karachi University (Governor's Nominee (1994–97)
- Member Board of Governors - Area Study Center for Europe (1994–97)
- Member Board of Governors - "REHAB" (NGO) (1998-2001)
- Re-nominated Member Syndicate - Karachi University, by the Governor of Sindh (2001–04)
- Member Board of Governors, Institute of Clinical Psychology (2001–04)
- Coordinator Legal Aid Committee headed by Justice (R) Nasir Aslam Zahid (2007–09)
- Participated in Mushairas and Literary Seminars locally and internationally and all over Pakistan as a prominent Urdu poet from Pakistan (1979-)
- Conducting Literary Programs on National Radio and Television for the past 45 years.
- Contributed weekly columns in the daily "Jahan Pakistan" (Oct 2013 - May 2015)
- Author of Poetry collection – "AKS Faryadi" which includes his globally famous poem "Wo Hamsafar Tha", with the maximum hits on any Pakistani poetry on YouTube in the shortest duration (2000).
- Research compilation of Linguistic requirements of Urdu in "Shairiyat". This book is prescribed by Board of Secondary Education Sindh, Pakistan in the Intermediate syllabus (2013).
- Printed Second poetry collection "Laraib" (2016).
- Adviser at Hamdard University, Pakistan to develop Curriculum for Bachelors and Masters Level Programs.
- Mentored research students for thesis on Urdu Poetry and Literature.
- Conducted, hosted, and presided over seminars for the promotion of Urdu Language.
- Developed a concept after research on Mir Anees Marsiya and connecting it with the video camera - film making technique.
- Worked on world-famous Urdu Poet, Ahmed Faraz's "Intikhab" of his poetry collection.
- 2020: Allama Iqbal Award from the Pakistan Academy of Letters for Urdu poetry.

== Books ==
=== عکسِ فریادی ===
Aks-e-Faryadi ("The Supplicant’s Reflection") A widely acclaimed collection of modern Urdu ghazals, reflecting themes of loss, memory, and socio-political consciousness. It remains Turabi’s most recognized work.

=== شاعریات ===
Sheriyat ("Poetics") A reflective work exploring the theoretical foundations and aesthetics of Urdu poetry, including Turabi’s insights into poetic structure, form, and metaphor.

=== لا رَیب ===
Laara'ib ("No Ambiguity") A collection of devotional poetry, including naʿat, manqabat, and salaam, paying tribute to sacred Islamic figures through lyrical verse.

=== لغتِ عوام ===
Lughat-ul-Awam ("Dictionary of the People") A dictionary of colloquial Urdu expressions and vernacular idioms, offering a sociolinguistic perspective on common speech and evolving popular usage.
