= Humsafar =

2011-12 Pakistani television series

- Title Card
- Also known as: Rafeeq Al Ruh
- Genre: Family drama; Romance
- Created by: Momina Duraid
- Based on: Humsafar by Farhat Ishtiaq
- Written by: Farhat Ishtiaq
- Screenplay by: Farhat Ishtiaq
- Directed by: Sarmad Sultan Khoosat
- Starring: Fawad Khan; Mahira Khan; Naveen Waqar; (See all Cast)
- Theme music composer: Waqar Ali
- Opening theme: Woh Humsafar Tha by Qurat-ul-Ain Balouch
- Ending theme: Woh Humsafar Tha by Qurat-ul-Ain Balouch
- Composer: Waqar Ali
- Country of origin: Pakistan
- Original language: Urdu
- No. of episodes: 23

Production
- Producers: Momina Duraid; Nina Kashif
- Production locations: Karachi; Hyderabad
- Camera setup: Multi-camera setup
- Running time: 38-42 minutes
- Production company: Momina Duraid Productions

Original release
- Network: Hum TV
- Release: September 24, 2011 – March 3, 2012

Humsafar (Urdu: ہم سفر, lit. 'Companion or Life Partner') is a 2011 Pakistani television series based on the novel of the same name by Farhat Ishtiaq (who also wrote the screenplay) and directed by Sarmad Sultan Khoosat. It stars Fawad Khan, Mahira Khan, and Naveen Waqar in lead roles and Atiqa Odho, Hina Khawaja Bayat, Behroze Sabzwari and Noor Hassan Rizvi in supporting roles. The series was first broadcast on 24 September 2011 on Hum TV.

Humsafar became the most successful program on the channel at the time, earning it widespread acclaim and international recognition. Due to its success, critics referred to this era of Pakistani television as a "Golden Age". It was claimed as the highest-rated serial of its time in Pakistan, with the TRPs of 10.71, peaking at 13.9 TRPs.

== Plot ==
Khirad Ahsaan belongs to a lower-middle-class community in Hyderabad and lives with her widowed mother, Maimoona, in a small apartment. As the series begins, she has recently completed her Bachelor of Science and is very strong in Mathematics as her father was a maths teacher. Maimoona's brother, Baseerat Hussain, is a self-made millionaire, who lives in Karachi. He is married to Farida, a social worker who runs a human rights NGO. They have one son, Ashar, who has an MBA from Yale and runs the family's high-powered firm with his father.

After Maimoona receives a cancer diagnosis, Baseerat brings her and Khirad to his large home in Karachi for treatment. When she realizes there is no cure, Maimoona asks Baseerat to arrange a marriage for Khirad. Feeling guilty for not taking better care of Maimoona, Baseerat compensates by promising that Ashar will marry Khirad, unbeknownst to Farida, Khirad, or Ashar. Farida opposes the match until Baseerat threatens to throw her out of the house if she does not accept it. While initially opposed, Ashar is emotionally manipulated by his father for the marriage, as well as Khirad by her mother. Sara, who is Ashar’s maternal cousin and childhood best friend who is in love with him, attempts suicide after both learning about the match and hearing from Ashar that he only sees her as a friend. After he rescues her, she promises to move on. Despite being against the idea, Ashar and Khirad get married in a simple nikkah ceremony. Within a short period, Maimoona dies, and Farida appears to have had a change of heart, treating Khirad as a daughter.

After an initial period of complications, Ashar and Khirad eventually find themselves deeply in love with each other. After Baseerat's sudden death, and encouraged by Ashar to follow her dreams, Khirad enrolls in a master's program in applied mathematics. Shortly after joining the program, she discovers that one of her classmates named Khizar, is Sara's paternal first cousin. Ashar becomes secretly jealous of their friendship. Khirad's involvement in college and her achievements also bother him. She and Farida also learn that Khirad is pregnant but decide to keep it as a surprise for Ashar.

However, Khirad never has the opportunity to tell him the news because she has been framed by Khizar, Farida, and Zarina who is Sara’s mother. Khirad learns that the love and attention from Farida, Zarina, and Khizar was a facade that hid a complex conspiracy. Farida feels that because Khirad had a lower-class upbringing, she is beneath Ashar. Zarina hopes that Sara will stop obsessing over Ashar's marriage to Khirad. Farida made a deal with Khizar to pay for his graduate studies in the United States and a marriage to Sara, unbeknownst to Sara and Zarina. With Baseerat gone, Farida, who never forgave him for threatening to throw her out, convinces Ashar that Khirad and Khizar had an affair, despite Khirad’s pleas of innocence. Unable to bear the idea and unwilling to hear Khirad's side of the story, Ashar leaves the house for a while. Farida uses his absence to further fabricate and throws Khirad out of the house in the middle of the night as an act of revenge against Baseerat. Khirad quickly writes a note to Ashar proclaiming her innocence and leaves it with one of the house helpers. She is then taken to Hyderabad by a good samaritan and finds a home with her former neighbour, Batool Bano. As Farida told Ashar that Khirad had run away with Khizar, Ashar declines Khirad's multiple calls. Thus, she realises that she will never be able to convince him of her innocence and gives up on their marriage. She gives birth alone to a premature baby and decides she would raise Hareem herself, working as a math teacher.

Four years later, driven by Hareem's need for open heart surgery, Khirad confronts Ashar. Her youthful innocence and fear of the world have now been both replaced by a firm and courageous persona that allows her to stand up to Ashar. She has also learned how to protect herself with documentation, evidence that forces Ashar to accept the reality that Hareem, whom he did not know existed, is his daughter. He brings them back home during the medical procedures. Khirad is then forced to confront both Sara and Farida, but the strength, independence, and confidence born of her hardships prevent them from bullying her.

Sara confesses her love to Ashar again, but he informs her that he cannot love anyone and that she should stop pursuing him. Khizar returns from America and starts to blackmail Farida by threatening to reveal Khirad's innocence to Ashar if Sara does not marry him. Under pressure, Farida visits Sara and urges her to marry Khizar, but Sara and her mother refuse. Distraught, Sara attempts suicide again, and this time she succeeds.

After Hareem's successful operation, Khirad secretly returns to Hyderabad and leaves Hareem with Ashar, telling him through a letter that he has full custody because she is not financially capable of taking care of her. However, the period with Khirad rekindled Ashar's feelings for her. While looking through a box of albums, Ashar finds Khirad's letter from four years earlier and finally reads it for the first time. The truth of the letter overwhelms him as he realizes he committed a terrible mistake in believing the scene from four years before. He then overhears a phone call between Farida and Khizar, which confirms that what he saw was a fabrication and that Farida deliberately threw Khirad out in order to disavow the unborn child.

Horrified by the reality of his unintentional complicity with the conspiracy against Khirad, he flees to Hyderabad to beg her for forgiveness. He manages to convince Khirad to return home, where they face Farida. In his absence, Farida had found the letter, and thus upon seeing them both, begins to repeat her series of lies. However, Ashar stands up to her, perhaps for the first time. He rejects Farida's narrative, proclaims Khirad's innocence, and states that she belongs in this home with their daughter. Farida becomes so frightened by Ashar's decision to support Khirad that she has a nervous breakdown and loses all connection with reality. Ashar takes full responsibility for all the events and begs Khirad to stay with him. Khirad is hesitant, stating that she is a different person now and that she isn't certain she can love him as she used to. She also wonders how Ashar could have imagined she was capable of the narrative fabricated about her and how he could have abandoned her if he genuinely loved her. Deeply ashamed, Ashar agrees and states that it was entirely his fault and that he has no right to expect she can ever forgive him. However, he hopes she will stay so they can raise Hareem together.

Khirad reluctantly consents to the arrangement, and a few months later, the three are shown enjoying in the rain as a happy family.

== Cast ==
=== Main ===
- Fawad Khan as Ashar Hussain : Khirad's husband; Baseerat and Farida's son; Hareem's father
- Mahira Khan as Khirad Ahsaan : Ashar's wife; Ahsaan and Maimoona's daughter; Hareem's mother
- Naveen Waqar as Sara Ajmal : Zareena's daughter; Farida's niece; Ashar's cousin & bestfriend
- Atiqa Odho as Farida Hussain : Baseerat's widow; Ashar's mother
- Behroze Sabzwari as Baseerat Hussain : Maimoona's brother; Farida's husband; Ashar's father
- Hina Khawaja Bayat as Zarina Ajmal : Farida's sister; Sara's mother
- Noor Hassan Rizvi as Khizar Alam : Sara's cousin
- Saba Faisal as Maimoona Ahsaan : Ahsaan's widow; Khirad's mother; Baseerat's sister
- Salma Zafar as Sherish
- Shahbaz Rajput as Ali
- Qaiser Naqvi as Batool Bano : Maimoona's friend and neighbour
- Sara Kashif as Hareem Hussain : Khirad and Ashar's daughter

=== Guest appearances ===
- Khalid Anam as Ahsaan : Khirad's father
- Mansha Pasha as the wife of Ashar's friend
- Kanwar Arsalan as Raza, Ashar's colleague
- Kanwar Atiq ur Rehman as Umar, Ashar's colleague
- Sarmad Khoosat as Dr. Idrees, Khirad's Professor

== Deviations from the novel ==
Although author Farhat Ishtiaq adapted the screenplay from her novel, Humsafar, there are differences between the two. While the novel is narrated from Hareem's perspective, the serial focuses on Khirad and Asher.

In the novel, Ashar is the brother of two sisters, while in the serial he has no siblings. In the novel, Sara is a minor character who is never close to Asher, becomes mentally ill and is hospitalised. In the serial, Sara is the main character who loves Ashar, is the love interest of Khizar, and dies at the end. In the novel, Khizar loves a girl named Mehreen and never returns from United States.

Khirad and Maimoona reside in Nawabshah in the novel, while the serial's location is in Hyderabad.

While the drama ends with Farida's nervous breakdown and Ashar and Khirad's slow reconciliation, the novel ends with Asher begging Khirad to take him back and Khirad falling into his arms.

== Soundtrack ==
Woh Humsafar Tha

Soundtrack album by Qurat-ul-Ain Balouch
- Released: 2011
- Genre: Theme song
- Length: 3:45
- Language: Urdu
- Label: Hum TV
- Producer: Momina Duraid

The show's theme song, Woh Humsafar Tha, was sung by Qurat-ul-Ain Balouch and composed by Waqar Ali. It serves both as the song for the title sequence and as background music during each episode.

This song is inspired by a ghazal written by Naseer Turabi, which he composed to convey his sorrow following the Fall of Dhaka in 1971. It also incorporates verses from Khalid Ahmad's ghazal 'Tark-e-Talluqat'.

== Production ==
=== Development ===
Humsafar’s producer Momina Duraid, notes that its development was somewhat serendipitous. Duraid was working with author Farhat Ishtiaq on another of her works when she suggested Humsafar as a potential project (because Duraid had just read “and thoroughly enjoyed” the novel). Ishtiaq then told her that Humsafar “had already been declined by two production houses,” to which Duraid responded: “If I can feel it," then the "public can feel it as well".

Ishtiaq states that when she started working on the novel, she "wanted to understand if the idea of love is complete without trust." Although she wrote the screenplay for Humsafar, she states that the novel differs from the television series, as "the former is more about the child, while the show concentrates on the parents as lovers".

== Reception ==
=== Release ===
Humsafar greatly impacted Pakistan's television industry (which had previously for a brief period of time been dominated by Indian Television). It was an enormously popular show during its national television run, was extensively discussed on social media, and by 2014 was the highest-rated Pakistani series to date. The series also had a large global audience. Star reported that the Humsafar page on Facebook had thousands of Pakistani-origin European and North American fans and viewers. Many said that although they had never watched a Pakistani drama, they are now completely hooked on Humsafar.

=== Critical reception ===
Many stated that the series led to a new phase in Urdu drama. Others argued that the series upheld misogyny and was regressive in its tendency to fall into stereotypes. Finally, some critics offered a middle ground, suggesting that the popularity of the series was due to a narrative that was both entrenched in patriarchy but also a critical response to it, offering characters and plot lines that reflected a degree of reality. Human rights activist Abira Ashfaq notes that “the terrible appeal of Humsafar is that it confirms characters and stories set in deeply patriarchal frameworks. It is sexist justice that soothes the hearts of patriarchal vigilantes and keeps us on because we want to see the mother-in-law shamed, humiliated and thrust out, and moral purity rise to the top in the reunion of Khirad and Ashar. It is a modern-day fairy tale, better than Cinderella, worse than Shrek; the born-again revival of TV drama in a tweeting world.” Kanika Rajani of The Indian Express argues that the series is unique in its decision to portray its protagonists as flawed, particularly "Asher’s frustration at his initial failed attempts to communicate with his wife." In a conversation with The Express Tribune in March 2021 , screenwriter Bee Gul found the series as "regressive", saying it didn't showcase a strong or positive narrative, and she further felt the show's depiction of abuse could normalize it in viewers' eyes, and that the protagonist should have stood up for herself.

=== Response to Khirad ===
Mahira Khan's portrayal of "Khirad" received positive feedback from critics and was popular with viewers when the serial debuted. To those who called Khirad a "downtrodden woman," Khan argued, "No, she was not. Go back and look at it, and there is a reason why she was not because the slap was removed from it, there were things that were removed and there were things that were brought in just to show that she had a spine." Khan further states that "Khirad is closest to my heart. We have a lot of crying women in serials. But despite going through so much hardship, Khirad is so dignified." Later, in September 2020, Khan reflected on Humsafar, stating that "Khirad is by far my most special character. She loved fiercely, she gave wholeheartedly and when it came to her self-respect she held that closest to her heart. What a woman."

=== Promotion ===
Hum TV gave the show its Hum Honorary Phenomenal Serial Award.

=== Broadcast ===
- Pakistan originally Broadcast in 2011 on Hum TV.
- Pakistan OTT Digital Broadcast in on Hum Tv Official Youtube Channel.
- India broadcast in 2014 on Zee Zindagi.
- India OTT Digital Broadcast in on Broadcast in on ZEE5.
- International (Global) Broadcast in on Netflix

== Stage adaptation ==
It was adapted as an Indian stage play and will directed by Imran Zahid.

== Awards and nominations ==
Date of ceremony	Award	Category	Recipient(s) and nominee(s)	Result	Ref.
2012	Lux Style Awards	Best Original Soundtrack	Qurat-ul-Ain Balouch	Won	
2012	Lux Style Awards	Best Song Of The Year	Woh Humsafar Tha - Qurat-ul-Ain Balouch	Won	
2013	Lux Style Awards	Best Television Serial - Satellite	Momina Duraid and Nina Kashif	Won	
2013	Lux Style Awards	Best Television Director	Sarmad Khoosat	Won	
2013	Lux Style Awards	Best Best Television Actor - Satellite	Fawad Khan	Won	
2013	Lux Style Awards	Best Television Actress - Satellite	Mahira Khan	Won	
2013	Pakistan Media Awards	Best Drama Serial	Humsafar – Momina Duraid and Nina Kashif	Won	
2013	Pakistan Media Awards	Best Drama Director	Sarmad Khoosat	Won	
2013	Pakistan Media Awards	Best Drama Actor	Fawad Khan	Nominated	
2013	Pakistan Media Awards	Best Drama Actress	Mahira Khan	Won	
2013	Pakistan Media Awards	Best Drama Supporting Actor	Noor Hassan	Nominated	
2013	Pakistan Media Awards	Best Drama Supporting Actress	Naveen Waqar	Won	
2013	Pakistan Media Awards	Best Drama Producer	Momina Duraid	Nominated	
2013	Hum Awards	Hum TV Phenomenal Drama Serial Award	Humsafar	Won	
2013	Hum Awards	Best On-Screen Couple	Mahira Khan and Fawad Khan	Won	
