= Mesut İktu =

Turkish operatic baritone (1947–2026)

Mesut İktu (22 May 1947 – 3 January 2026) was a Turkish operatic baritone, administrator and voice teacher. He was manager and artistic director of the Turkish State Opera and Ballet from 1987 to 1991 and again from 2001 to 2003. İktu was born in Ankara on 22 May 1947, and died in Istanbul on 3 January 2026, at the age of 78.

== Discography ==
- Türk ezgileri – Turkish Folksongs. Kalan. 2009
- The Art of Turkish Song – Necil Kazım Akses (1908–1999), Ahmet Adnan Saygun (1907–1991), Nevit Kodallı (1924–2009), İlhan Usmanbaş (1921–), Muammer Sun (1932–), Cenan Akın (1932–2006), İlhan Baran (1934–), Cemal Reşit Rey (1904–1985), Ulvi Cemal Erkin (1906–1973), Gürer Aykal (1942–). Mesut Iktu, baritone. Sergey Gavrilov, piano VMS
- Bariton Opera arias – Ahmed Adnan Saygun, Gürer Aykal, Rachmaninoff, Tchaikovsky, Wagner, Verdi, Schubert, Brahms, Mahler and Glinka. cond. Maciej Niesiołowski. Kalan Music 2009.
