= Mesut Doğan =

Turkish-Austrian futsal player

Mesut Doğan (born 4 October 1984) is a Turkish-Austrian futsal player. He currently plays for Stella Rossa Vienna and has previously played for FAC Vienna.

He is a member of the Turkey national futsal team in the UEFA Futsal Championship.
