= Daily Imroze =

Pakistani daily newspaper

Daily Imroze (Urdu: روزنامہ اِمروز) is an Urdu language newspaper in Pakistan published daily from Karachi.

This is one of the oldest newspapers of Pakistan that originally started publishing from Lahore in the newly independent Pakistan soon after 1947. It had distinguished people like Maqbool Jahangir, Ahmad Nadeem Qasmi, Intezar Hussain and Shafqat Tanvir Mirza among its journalists, columnists and editors from the 1950s to 1970s.
