= Ahmad Nadeem Qasmi =

Pakistani writer (1916-2006)

Ahmad Nadeem Qasmi احمد ندیم قاسمی SI PP
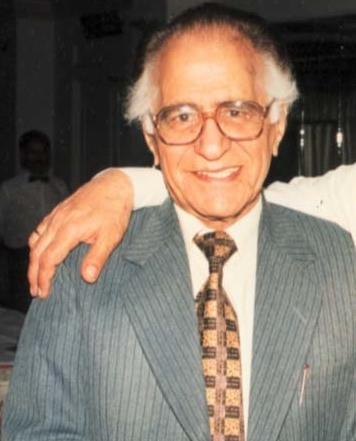
- Ahmad Nadeem Qasmi at an event
- Born: Ahmad Shah Awan; 20 November 1916; Angah, Khushab, Punjab, British India
- Died: 10 July 2006 (aged 89); Lahore, Pakistan
- Citizenship: Pakistan
- Education: Bachelor of Arts (BA) degree from the Punjab University, Lahore, Pakistan
- Alma mater: Govt. Sadiq Egerton College Bahawalpur
- Occupations: Urdu poet, journalist, writer, scholar
- Spouse: Rabia Nadeem
- Children: Naheed Qasimi, Nishat Nadeem, Noman Nadeem
- Writing career
- Pen name: Nadeem
- Genres: Poetry, Afsana
- Notable awards: Pride of Performance Award by the President of Pakistan (1968); Sitara-i-Imtiaz (Star of Excellence) Award by the Government of Pakistan (1980)
- Literary movement: Progressive Writers Movement; A member of Progressive Writers' Association

Signature
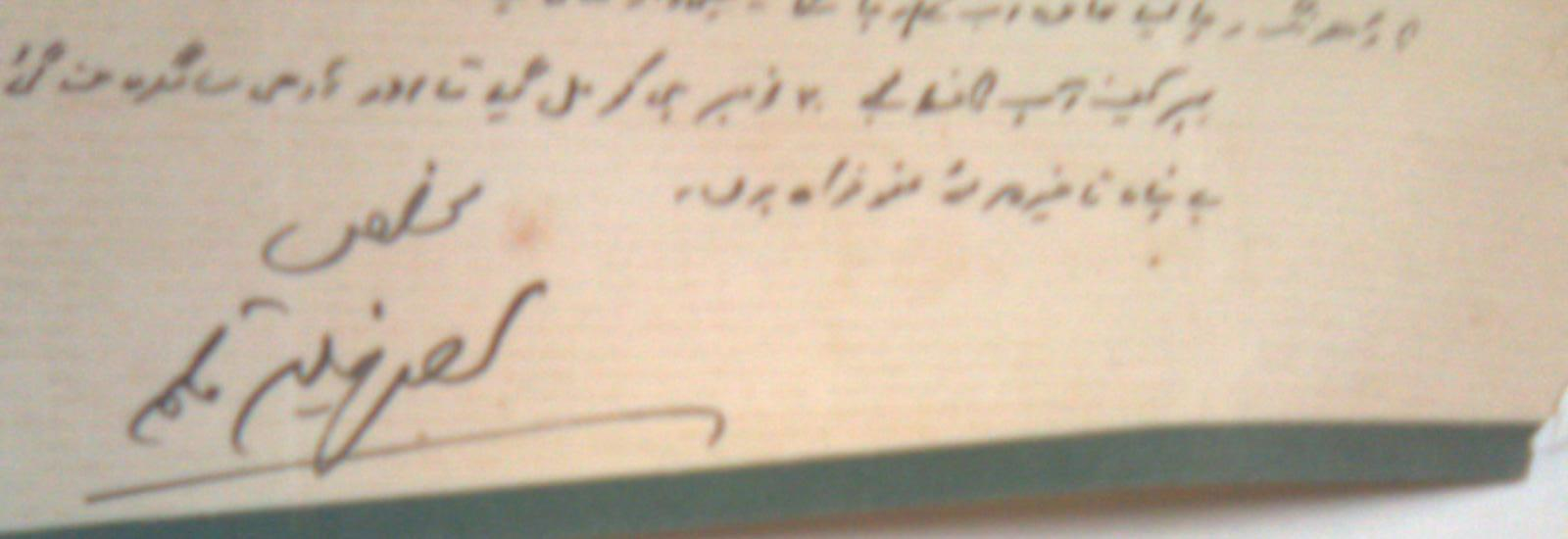

Ahmad Nadeem Qasmi (Note: Urdu: احمد ندیم قاسمی) (born Ahmad Shah Awan; (Note: Urdu: احمد شاہ اعوان) 20 November 1916 – 10 July 2006) was a Pakistani Urdu language poet, journalist, literary critic, dramatist and short story author.

A major figure in contemporary Urdu literature, he wrote 50 books on poetry, fiction, literary criticism, journalism and art. His poetry was distinguished by its humanism, and his Urdu afsana (short story) work is considered by some second only to Munshi Premchand in its depiction of rural culture. He was also the editor and publisher of the literary magazine Funoon for almost half a century. He received awards such as the Pride of Performance (1968) and Sitara-e-Imtiaz (1980) for his literary work.

Gulzar, one of the most influential writers in modern India, called him his mentor and guru.

== Early life and education ==
Qasmi was born on November 20, 1916, in the village of Anga in Khushab, Punjab, British India, into an Awan family. He belonged to a family of Sufi pirs or spiritual saints.

He graduated from a high school in Campbellpur in 1931, (now renamed Attock city in Pakistan), around the time when he wrote his first poem, he studied at Government College Attock. Later he studied at Sadiq Egerton College in Bahawalpur. He graduated from the University of Punjab, Lahore in 1935. In 1939 he began to work as sub-inspector in the Excise Department but resigned in 1942 as it didn't fit with his temperament.

He had a brother, Peerzada Mohammad Bakhsh Qasmi, and a sister. He had a daughter Naheed.

Active in the Pakistan Movement, he joined the Punjab Muslim League.

He became an active member of the Progressive Writers' Movement as a secretary and was arrested many times during the 1950s and 1970s.

== Death ==
Ahmad Nadeem Qasmi died on 10 July 2006 of complications from asthma at Punjab Institute of Cardiology in Lahore.

== Literary career ==
Qasmi edited several prominent literary journals, including Phool, Tehzeeb-i-Niswaan, Adab-i-Lateef, Savera, Naqoosh, and his own journal, Funoon. He also worked as the editor of the Urdu daily Daily Imroze. Qasimi contributed weekly columns to national newspapers like Rawan Dawan and Daily Jang for several decades. His poetry has included both traditional ghazals and modern nazms. Ahmad Nadeem Qasmi was also committed to mentoring and grooming others.

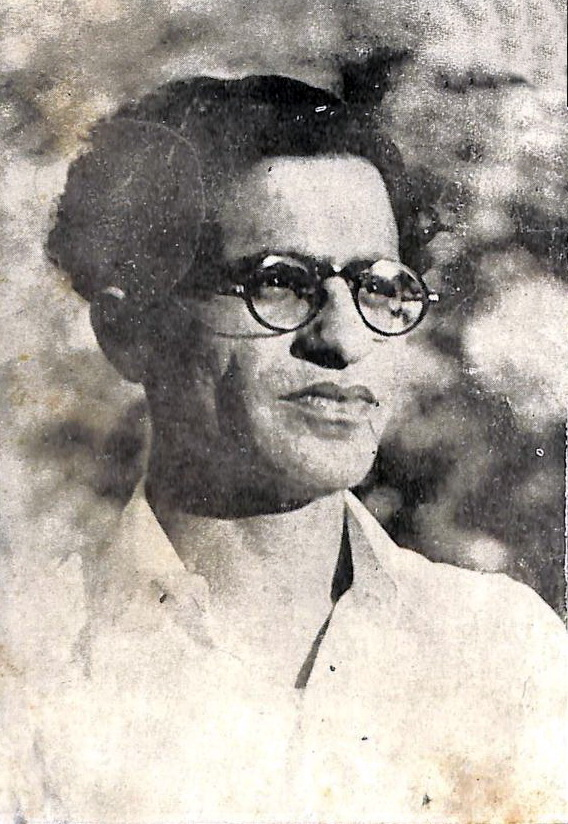
Qasmi in May 1949

In 1948, he was selected as the secretary-general of the Anjuman-e-Taraqqi Pasand Musannifeen (Progressive Writers' Movement) for Punjab. In 1949, he was elected the secretary-general of the organisation for Pakistan.

In 1962, Qasmi published his own literary magazine Fanoon, with the support of writers and poets including Khadija Mastoor, Hajra Masroor, Ahmed Faraz, Amjad Islam Amjad, Ata ul Haq Qasmi, and Munnu Bhai. Together they did a lot of creative publishing. Qasmi was the mentor of the poet Parveen Shakir. In 1974, he was appointed secretary-general of Majlis-Taraqee-Adab, a literary body established by the government of West Pakistan in 1958.

In December 2011, Professor Fateh Muhammad Malik and noted columnist Ata ul Haq Qasmi arranged a seminar on the life and achievements of Ahmad Nadeem Qasmi at the International Islamic University, Islamabad. Urdu writers, poets, and critics have appreciated and admired his literary work, although there is also criticism of his literary work and his personality. Fateh Muhammad Malik is a long-time friend of Ahmed Nadeem Qasmi. In his book about the life and personality of Ahmed Nadeem Qasmi called 'Nadeem Shanasi', he gives the impression that it is evident from Qasmi's letters to him that Qasmi had a buried dislike for Faiz Ahmed Faiz and perhaps considered himself a poet greater than Faiz. "The letters also reveal that Qasmi had a narcissistic personality and an inflated ego when it came to his contemporaries. He consciously or unconsciously tried to belittle Faiz, though without much effect."

Some people in literary circles of Pakistan also think that there were some envy and rivalry among Ahmad Nadeem Qasmi, Wazir Agha and Munir Niazi.

=== An example of his poetry, with translation ===
Dawar-e hashr! mujhe teri qasam

Umr bhar mein ne ibadat ki hay
Tu mera namaa-e-amaal tau dekh

Mein ne insaan se mohabbat ki hay

O Lord of the Day of Judgment
I swear by you
I have worshipped all my life
Look at my balance sheet
I have loved mankind

== Bibliography ==
Poetry

- Jalal-o-Jamal
- Shola-i-Gul
- Kisht-i-Wafa
- Dasht-e-wafa
- Dawam
- Muheet
- Loh-e-khaak
- Baseet
- Jamal
- Arz-o-sama

Short stories

- Afsaanay (40 best short stories selected by Ahmad Nadeem Qasmi himself)
- Chaupaal (1939)
- Gandasa was also a source of inspiration for the legendary character Maula Jatt which eventually resulted in the making of the Maula Jatt (1979 film)
- Sannata
- Kapaas ka Phool
- Aabley
- Tuloo-O-Gharoob
- Sailab-o-Gardab
- Aanchal
- Ghar se Ghar Tak
- Nila-pathar
- Dawam-dar-o-deewar
- Bazar-e-Hayat
- Aas-paas
- Jhoota
- Bhoot
- Jalebis

== Awards and recognition ==
- Pride of Performance Award by the President of Pakistan in 1968
- Sitara-i-Imtiaz (Star of Excellence) Award by the President of Pakistan in 1980
- Lifetime Achievement Award by the Pakistan Academy of Letters
- Islamabad's 7th Avenue named after Ahmed Nadeem Qasmi.

== See also ==
- List of Pakistani journalists
- List of Pakistani poets
- List of Pakistani writers
