= Pakistan Idol =

Pakistani reality singing competition

- Pakistan Idol title card
- Also known as: Pakistan Idol: جو ہے دل کی آواز; Pakistan Idol: #iDilSeAwaz
- Genre: Reality television
- Created by: Simon Fuller
- Directed by: Saad Bin Mujeeb
- Presented by: Mohib Mirza; Syed Shafaat Ali
- Judges: Season 1: Hadiqa Kiani; Ali Azmat; Bushra Ansari; Season 2: Fawad Khan; Rahat Fateh Ali Khan; Zeb Bangash; Bilal Maqsood
- Theme music composer: Julian Gingell; Cathy Dennis; Barry Stone
- Country of origin: Pakistan
- No. of seasons: 2
- No. of episodes: 42 (list of episodes)

Production
- Production locations: Karachi, Pakistan
- Running time: 54–105 minutes
- Production companies: FremantleMedia; 19 Entertainment

Original release
- Network: Geo Entertainment
- Release: 6 December 2013 – 27 April 2014
- Release: 4 October 2025 – present

Pakistan Idol is a Pakistani reality singing competition that is a part of the Idols franchise created by Simon Fuller and owned by 19 Entertainment and FremantleMedia. It is the 50th adaptation of the familiar reality competition format introduced in the British series Pop Idol in 2001. It is developed for the Pakistani entertainment market by Geo TV.

Geo TV acquired the production rights for Pakistan Idol as early as 2007 but could not begin production due to the security conditions in the country and abstruse quandaries of production. The production officially began in September 2013 when three prominent celebrities from the Pakistan entertainment industry were chosen to constitute the judging panel for the show. The series was officially launched on 19 September 2013 with the initial auditions beginning the same day and continuing until 25 October 2013. It was first broadcast on television on 6 December 2013.

The series aims to find new solo recording artists from across Pakistan and the winner would be decided by viewers' votes through the Internet, telephone and text messages. A series of 41 episodes are planned for the first season with special behind-the-scenes episodes which will be aired during the finals week. The series attracted tens of thousands of people from across the 850 cities, towns and villages in Pakistan while the series' official telecom sponsor Mobilink reported that it received 10,861 call-in entries through its mobile auditions after the lines were opened for general public. The Geo TV management is hopeful the series would boost its target rating point average; however due to the strict advertising guidelines set by Ofcom, the series saw delays in its launch on the United Kingdom screens.

== History ==
Pakistan Idol is an adaptation of the reality singing competition Pop Idol created in 2001 by Simon Fuller's production company 19 Entertainment. The idea for the show was introduced to Fuller by Nigel Lythgoe had been inspired by the New Zealand reality show Popstars. Fuller and Lythgoe used the Popstars formula of employing a panel of judges to audition and select singer while also adding other elements such telephone voting by the viewing public (an idea already used in singing competitions like the Eurovision Song Contest), dramatic back-stories of contestants and real-life unfolding of soap opera in real time.

Pop Idol debuted in 2001 in Britain with Lythgoe as the producer and Simon Cowell as one of the judges. The television format saw instant success with the viewing public. Ten years later, Pakistan Idol became the 50th adaptation of this popular television format, based on the original Pop Idol series.

Imran Aslam, president of Geo TV, had acquired the production rights for Pakistan Idol from FreemantleMedia in 2007, but could not continue any further with the production because of the security issues in Pakistan. War against Taliban occupation broke out in north-western Pakistani province of Khyber Pakhtunkhwa bringing production to a halt. Among other problems, the series' director of content and production Saad Bin Mujeeb also cited various abstruse quandaries of production that held back production for another six years. Mujeeb acknowledged that "the security situation has not improved much" but their production company has gotten used to "dealing with [such] threats".

Production finally began in 2013 when the core team including Noor ul Huda, Qudsia Karim Waqar Khan and the HOD Saad bin Mujeeb show's producers picked a group of celebrities from the Pakistan entertainment industry to constitute the panel of judges. There was speculation about who would make it to the judges' panel. The panel was confirmed in due course and included renowned singer Hadiqa Kiani, sufi rock band Junoon's lead vocalist Ali Azmat, and television presenter Bushra Ansari. Television actor Mohib Mirza was selected to host the show, while the official theme for Pakistan Idol was performed by Ali Zafar.

The series was launched on 19 September 2013 after the management at Geo TV were confident about their "security measures" and "[ability] to take on this massive undertaking". Speaking at the launch ceremony, Imran Aslam said that Pakistan had "a history of producing talented musicians across genres" and this series would aim to revive this "cherished" cultural tradition. The initial auditions began on 19 September 2013 and continued until 25 October 2013. The series was first broadcast on 6 December 2013.

== Judges and hosts ==
Host
Judge

Cast member	Season	
Cast member	1 2013	2 2025
Mohib Mirza	●	
Anoushey Ashraf	●	
Shafaat Ali		●
Hadiqa Kiani	●	
Ali Azmat	●	
Bushra Ansari	●	
Rahat Fateh Ali Khan		●
Zeb Bangash		●
Fawad Khan		●
Bilal Maqsood		●

== Series overview ==
Season	Episodes	Originally released			Winner	Runner-up
Season	Episodes	First released	Last released	Network	Winner	Runner-up
1	42	December 6, 2013	April 27, 2014	Geo TV	Zamad Baig	Muhammad Shoaib
2	39	October 4, 2025	August 23, 2026	Geo TV	Hira Qaisar	Aryan Naveed, Maham Tahir, Nabeel Abbas, Rouhan Abbas, Samya Gohar, Tarab Nafees, Waqar Hussain

== Selection process ==
In a series of steps, Pakistan Idol selected its eventual winner out of many tens of thousands of contestants who auditioned across Pakistan.

=== Contestant eligibility ===
At the launch of the series, the producers confirmed that eligible contestants were required to be between 15 and 30 years of age. Contestants were required to be legal Pakistani residents and could not hold a current recording or talent-representation contract at the time of participation. These eligibility rules were consistent with other international versions of the Idol franchise.

=== Initial auditions ===
In the first season, contestants registered for auditions through SMS subscriptions and attended open auditions held in cities across Pakistan, including Lahore, Faisalabad, Islamabad, Multan, Sukkur and Karachi. Although auditions attracted more than 10,000 hopefuls in some cities, only a small fraction progressed beyond the earliest screening rounds.

Contestants initially performed in front of selectors, which could include members of the production team. Those who advanced were then invited to audition in front of the judging panel, the only audition stage shown on television. Judges selected approximately 80–100 contestants based on vocal ability, performance confidence and personality, awarding them a "Golden Ticket" that allowed them to proceed to the next stage in Karachi.

The programme also featured sponsor-led initiatives such as "Clear Last Chance Auditions", which allowed additional contestants to audition outside the main city rounds.

For the second season, auditions adopted a hybrid model, combining online video submissions with in-person auditions in major cities, broadening national participation.

=== Theatre rounds ===
Following the initial auditions in season one, 86 contestants advanced to the Theatre Round held in Karachi. Contestants performed across multiple elimination stages in a theatre setting. In the first round, singers performed individually in small groups, after which the field was reduced to 35 contestants.

The remaining contestants were required to perform in duos and trios, testing vocal harmony and adaptability, before advancing to a solo performance round accompanied by backing tracks. At the conclusion of the Theatre Round, the judges selected the final Top 24 contestants to proceed to the next phase of the competition.

In season two, contestants who progressed from auditions similarly advanced through intermediate elimination rounds before being selected for the live performance stage.

=== Piano shows ===
In the first season, the Top 24 contestants entered the Piano Show stage, where they were divided into three groups of eight and performed live over multiple episodes. From each group, three contestants were selected to advance based on judges’ evaluations, while viewers voted one additional contestant into the next stage as a wildcard entrant. This process resulted in a Top 13 advancing to the finals.

=== Audience voting ===
From the Piano Shows onward, the fate of the contestants was increasingly determined by public vote. During live broadcasts, each contestant was assigned a dedicated telephone number, allowing viewers to vote via calls or text messages. Contestants receiving the lowest number of votes were eliminated in successive weeks until a winner emerged.

In season two, audience voting similarly played a central role once contestants entered the Gala rounds, with judges providing critiques while public votes determined eliminations.

=== Semi-finals ===
During the semi-final stage, contestants performed in themed live shows. In the first season, male and female contestants performed on separate nights at certain stages, with eliminations continuing weekly until the finalists were determined.

In the second season, the competition progressed from a Top 16 through successive Gala rounds, with eliminations based on audience voting and judges’ feedback.

=== Finals ===
The finals consisted of a concluding series of live shows in which the remaining contestants performed for the last time. One finalist was eliminated prior to the final result, after which the contestant receiving the highest number of public votes was declared the winner.

=== Rewards for winner and finalists ===
At the grand finale, the winning contestant received prize money, a recording contract, and the title of Pakistan Idol, consistent with the international Idol franchise format.

== Season synopses ==
Each season of Pakistan Idol premieres with audition rounds held in multiple cities across Pakistan. The audition episodes feature a mix of potential finalists, distinctive personalities and unsuccessful contestants. Successful auditionees receive a Golden Ticket (and, in later seasons, a Golden Mic) allowing them to advance to the next stage of the competition.

Following auditions, contestants progress through theatre rounds, where the judging panel narrows the field to a fixed number of semifinalists. From the semifinals onward, contestants perform live in themed weekly shows, with judges offering critiques after each performance. Eliminations are determined through a combination of judging outcomes and public voting. Results episodes often include group performances by contestants as well as appearances by guest artists. The season culminates in a grand finale, where the winner of the competition is announced.

With the exception of the inaugural season, contestants in the advanced stages perform in front of a studio audience and are accompanied by a live band. In later seasons, the format expanded to include digital audition submissions alongside traditional city rounds, and introduced format variations such as wild card entries and judge-selected advancements.

=== Season 1 (2013–2014) ===
The first season of Pakistan Idol debuted on 6 December 2013 on the Geo Network. It was hosted by Mohib Mirza and Anoushey Ashraf.

During the audition phase, contestants were selected from auditions held across major cities and regional centres throughout Pakistan. A total of 86 contestants advanced beyond the initial auditions before being reduced through subsequent rounds to a Top 24, and later to a smaller group of finalists competing in the live shows. The season featured multiple eliminations that generated public discussion, including the early exit of several audience favourites.

The final showdown was between Muhammad Shoaib and Zamad Baig. While Shoaib consistently received strong public support throughout the competition, Baig impressed judges and viewers with performances rooted in Sufi and classical styles. Zamad Baig was declared the winner in the grand finale aired on 27 April 2014.

In keeping with the Idol franchise tradition, the winner signed a recording contract following the conclusion of the season. The season remains the only completed run of the original Pakistan Idol format prior to the programme’s hiatus.

=== Season 2 (2025–2026) ===
Pakistan Idol returned in 2025 as a reboot of the series, subtitled Pakistan Idol – Aayi Dil Se Awaaz. The season premiered on 4 October 2025 and was hosted by Shafaat Ali, with Rahat Fateh Ali Khan, Zeb Bangash, Fawad Khan and Bilal Maqsood serving as judges.

Auditions for the second season were conducted through a hybrid format combining online video submissions and in-person city rounds. Selected contestants advanced to the theatre rounds, after which a Top 16 was chosen to compete in the live performance stage. Beginning with the live shows, contestants performed in themed Gala rounds, with judges' evaluations and public voting determining eliminations.

During the season, contestant M. Ibrar Shahid withdrew from the competition, alleging unfair production practices. The programme's producers rejected his claims and stated that the show adhered to international Idol franchise standards.

Production was subsequently interrupted for several months. In June 2026, director Nadeem J said that production had been temporarily halted by administrative and external disruptions, but confirmed that work on the remaining episodes had resumed. The competition returned to television in August 2026, continuing with the Top 8 contestants.

The season concluded with a finale on 23 August 2026, in which Hira Qaisar of Faisalabad was crowned the winner. Hira received the Pakistan Idol shield and a cash prize of Rs1.5 million, while the other seven finalists received shields and Rs500,000 each. The finale featured performances by the judges and a special appearance by Atif Aslam.

The season was broadcast simultaneously across multiple Pakistani television networks and streamed internationally through the Begin platform.

== Official theme song ==
"Awaaz Mein Teri"

Song by Ali Zafar
- Language: Urdu: "آواز میں تیری"
- Released: 7 December 2013
- Recorded: 2013
- Genre: Theme music; pop; rock
- Length: 2:16; 2:23 (music video)
- Songwriter: Ali Zafar
External media
Audio
- Pakistan Idol Anthem on SoundCloud
Video
- Pakistan Idol Anthem on YouTube

The original theme music of Idols TV series has been composed by Julian Gingell, Barry Stone and Cathy Dennis, which was also used as opening theme in Pakistan Idol. However, an anthem "Awaaz Mein Teri" was released on 7 December 2013 to promote the series in Pakistan. The anthem concept was created by Ali Zafar; who wrote, composed and sung the song. Shani Arshad and Soheb Akhtar served for the song as music director and music video director respectively.

== Reception ==
=== Critical reception ===
The premiere episode was broadcast on Geo TV on 6 December 2013 and opened to a critical acclaim. The humiliating attitudes of the show's judges however were not entirely welcomed by the television audiences with various people condemning the judges' mockery on social media with a public petition attracting almost 1500 signatures and demanding apologies from the show's management in this regard. The judges have also raised the ire of some with their recent rejection of a talented young girl from Punjab named Maria Meer, who became a sort of social media celebrity after her appearance on the show.

=== Controversies ===
From the inception of show, back in 2007, Pakistan Idol faces many problems and immense negative response by audience which leads to stop the production of franchise, it then took six years to handle all the problems and show finally went on air in late 2013. Owing to the production with linearly, shows became icon of the year, all the perceptions went wrong and series garnered millions views.

Saray Gama, a production house based in the United Kingdom, accused Pakistan Idol of violating their copyrights when the series' sponsors used songs used in the show on their individual websites. The production house claimed that the production rights acquired by the show do not naturally extend to promotional material used by their sponsors.

After the selection of 24 semi-finalist race begins to reach at place of Top 13, and the fate of 24 contestants to winner was put on audience by public voting. With the Top 13, contestants like Mehwish, Waqas and Sajid which had been consistent throughout the show were eliminated after facing public votes, this affects and arise many questions on voting system, Judges were left mournful and doleful with the departure of consistent singers, therefore, production of series overviews the voting system and announce that an individual with one number can give maximum 25 Votes to contestants, above that figure no vote will be counted and one vote cost reported Rs. 0.50 Paisa + Tax.

During the auditions, show went through the limelight of controversial happening, when in Faisalabad auditions a young girl Maria Meer was rejected by all three judges on course of the immaturity and lean voice of her. The audition episode went viral and a blog war started against judges. Maria became a sort of social media celebrity after her appearance on the show. Her rejection got too much attention that famous writer, broadcaster and journalist Raza Ali Abidi stated on his social networking site that: "A girl who is treated so badly in trials of show, i wish some channel with good producers must have done a great-show with her. I need your positive response!". After much controversial act, aspiring singer-songwriter and producer Amanat Ali approaches to Maria Meer family and decided to launch a music video with her. In album of Amanat "Aas", song "Naina Lagay" featuring Maria and himself was recorded, online release of song got much acclaim and Amanat received critical acclaim and appraisal for his step. Maria was invited and approached by many media personalities for interviews and programs.

== Revenue and commercial ventures ==
=== Media sponsorship ===
CLEAR and Pepsi are the two foremost sponsors of Pakistan Idol in its first season. Q Mobile and Mobilink are the official telecom partners of the reality show.

- CLEAR – The sponsor is featured on promotional material for the show and also organised a special online audition drive called CLEAR Last Chance Auditions to give people, who missed the initial auditions, another chance.
- Pepsi – Cups bearing the sponsor's logo are featured prominently on the judges' table.
- Mobilink – The cellular company is promoted as the show's chosen provider for text votes. The company also organised a mobile audition drive in which contestants were able to record a 60-second audition to be evaluated by the judges.
- QMobile – The sponsor's logo is issued in promotional material with the by-line "powered by QMobile".

== Revival ==
In July 2025, It was confirmed that Pakistan Idol would be making a comeback with Fawad Khan, Bilal Maqsood, Rahat Fateh Ali Khan and Zeb Bangash as the judges. On 4 August 2025, 2 official promos of Pakistan Idol - Season 2 released featuring Fawad Khan and Bilal Maqsood confirming the beginning of auditions.

== See also ==
- Pakistan's Got Talent
- MasterChef Pakistan
- Shark Tank Pakistan
