= Sang-e-Meel Publications =

Urdu publisher in Pakistan

- Type: Publishing House
- Industry: Publishing
- Founded: 1962
- Headquarters: Lahore, Pakistan
- Key people: Ashfaq Ahmed, Faiz Ahmed Faiz, Raza Ali Abidi, Mustansar Hussain Tarar, Saadat Hasan Manto, Razia Butt, Intizar Hussain, Qudratullah Shahab, Mirza Azeem Baig Chughtai, Qurat-ul-Ain Haider and many more
- Products: Urdu books, new titles, old Urdu titles, classic and rare books

Sang-e-Meel Publications is a Lahore-based publishing house that was established in 1962 in Pakistan. It has to its credit of being the foremost publisher of Urdu books after the partition of India in 1947. Apart from publishing numerous new titles, it is also credited with publication of old Urdu titles and classic and rare books.

It has to its credit the publication of books of famous writers like: Ashfaq Ahmed, Faiz Ahmed Faiz, Raza Ali Abidi, Mustansar Hussain Tarar, Saadat Hasan Manto, Razia Butt, Intizar Hussain, Qudratullah Shahab, Mirza Azeem Baig Chughtai, Qurat-ul-Ain Haider and many more.

== See also ==
- Ferozsons
- List of Urdu language book publishing companies
