= Pakistan Idol season 2 =

Pakistan reality TV show

Pakistan Idol
- Season 2
- Promotional image
- Hosted by: Shafaat Ali
- Judges: Rahat Fateh Ali Khan; Zeb Bangash; Fawad Khan; Bilal Maqsood
- Winner: Hira Qaisar
- Runners-up: Aryan Naveed, Maham Tahir, Nabeel Abbas, Rouhan Abbas, Samya Gohar, Tarab Nafees, Waqar Hussain
- No. of episodes: 39

Release
- Original network: Geo TV; PTV Home; A-Plus TV; Green Entertainment; Express Entertainment
- Original release: 4 October 2025 – 23 August 2026

Season chronology
- ← Previous; Season 1

Pakistan Idol - Season 2 also known as Pakistan Idol - Aayi Dil Se Awaaz was the second season of Pakistani reality television series Pakistan Idol. It was announced in August 2025 as a reboot of the series, which originally aired in 2013–2014 created by Simon Fuller.

The first episode of season premiered on 4 October 2025, with auditions in Sukkur. The season is being hosted by Shafaat Ali and the judges panel includes Rahat Fateh Ali Khan, Zeb Bangash, Fawad Khan and Bilal Maqsood. Hira Qaisar won the competition, with Aryan Naveed, Maham Tahir, Nabeel Abbas, Rouhan Abbas, Samya Gohar, Tarab Nafees, and Waqar Hussain finishing as runners-up.

== Background ==
Pakistan Idol first aired on Geo TV from 2013 to 2014. After an eleven-year hiatus, the network confirmed in August 2025 that the programme would return for a second season. The announcement included details of a new judging panel and was covered by multiple Pakistani and international media outlets.

== Auditions ==
Auditions for the second season were conducted through a combination of digital submissions and in-person city rounds. Aspiring contestants were required to submit a 60-second singing video via the Begin.Watch application during the audition window. Based on these digital submissions, selected applicants were shortlisted and invited to attend live city auditions.

The in-person auditions took place across several cities in Pakistan in August 2025. Participation in the city auditions was limited to shortlisted contestants and was not open to walk-in applicants.

During the audition phase, the judges awarded a limited number of Golden Mic selections to standout performers. Contestants receiving a Golden Mic advanced directly to the Top 16 stage of the competition, bypassing further elimination rounds in the audition phase.

Pakistan Idol (season 2) – auditions
Location	Date(s)	Venue / Platform
Online auditions
Nationwide	2025	Begin.Watch app (60-second video submission)
Live auditions
Sukkur	17 August 2025	Sukkur Arts Council
Multan	20 August 2025	Multan Arts Council
Lahore	23 August 2025	Alhamra Cultural Complex
Rawalpindi / Islamabad	25 August 2025	Rawalpindi Arts Council
Karachi	31 August 2025	Arts Council of Pakistan

== Format ==
Pakistan Idol season 2 follows the established Idol franchise format, adapted for a contemporary Pakistani audience. Marking the show's return after an eleven-year hiatus, the season premiered on 4 October 2025 and utilizes a multi-stage elimination process driven by both expert judging and public participation.

The competition begins with an extensive audition phase, conducted both on-ground and digitally. In-person auditions take place in major urban centers including Sukkur, Multan, Lahore, Rawalpindi, and Karachi. For the first time, the season also incorporates an online audition gateway via the Begin streaming platform, allowing aspiring singers to submit video entries remotely. Contestants who receive a majority of "yes" votes from the judging panel advance to the theatre rounds.

In the theatre rounds, performers are tested through solo performances. This phase serves as the final filter before the Gala and live performance shows. Beginning at the Top 16 stage, contestants perform weekly themed sets before a national audience, with public voting opening in the background during each broadcast. While the judges continue to provide real-time critiques, their scores are used to determine a weekly bottom three, from which the contestant receiving the lowest number of public votes is eliminated. The remaining contestants advance, with viewer voting ultimately determining who is crowned the winner.

The season is being broadcast simultaneously across several major networks, including Geo TV, PTV Home, and A-Plus TV. For international viewers and digital-first audiences, the series is streamed live and on-demand via the Begin platform, representing the first time a Pakistani reality series has employed such an extensive multi-network and digital distribution strategy.

== Production ==
=== Production delays ===
Production of the programme was interrupted multiple times during its run. Earlier in the season, the show took a temporary break amid funding issues, before production resumed. The programme was later halted again amid further funding and legal issues affecting its production. The interruption extended through the scheduled Ramadan period, and the show ultimately returned on 23 August 2026. The delay also affected the scheduling of the finale, which was postponed amid regional tensions and calls for national austerity. The organisers stated that it was not appropriate to hold a large-scale national celebration while tensions were escalating, and assured the remaining contestants that the finale would take place at a later date.

== Top 16 contestants ==
The contestants who advanced beyond the theatre round, including those awarded a Golden Mic during the audition and theatre stages, are listed below:

Contestant	Hometown	Status
Hira Qaisar §	Faisalabad, Punjab	Winner
Aryan Naveed Bhatti	Bahawalpur, Punjab	Runner-up
Maham Tahir	Khanpur, Punjab	Runner-up
Nabeel Abbas Khan §	Dera Ghazi Khan, Punjab	Runner-up
Rouhan Abbas Δ	Kunjah, Punjab	Runner-up
Samya Gohar	Lahore, Punjab	Runner-up
Tarab Nafees	Karachi, Sindh	Runner-up
Waqar Hussain	Karachi, Sindh	Runner-up
Faryal Amber §	Faisalabad, Punjab	Eliminated on 15 February 2026
Zain Baloch	Multan, Punjab	Eliminated on 15 February 2026
Mehtab Ali §	Ghotki, Sindh	Eliminated on 8 February 2026
Merab Javilin	Karachi, Sindh	Eliminated on 8 February 2026
Muhammad Minaam Δ	Karachi, Sindh	Eliminated on 31 January 2026
Rawish Rubab	Layyah, Punjab	Eliminated on 18 January 2026
Rohail Asghar §	Jhang, Punjab	Eliminated on 18 January 2026
Romaisa Tariq §	Lahore, Punjab	Eliminated on 21 December 2025
Mohammad Ibrar	Shahdara, Punjab	Withdrew prior to Gala 1 round

§ Golden Mic:Contestant received a Golden Mic during the auditions or theatre stages, granting them direct advancement to the Top 16 stage.

Δ Wild Card: Contestant entered the competition as a Wild Card.

Note: Mohammad Ibrar withdrew from the competition during the Top 16 stage and was replaced by Muhammad Minaam, who entered the competition as a Wild Card.

== Finals ==
Color key:

This contestant was chosen by the judges to advance.
This contestant was chosen by the public as a wildcard after failing to qualify for the Top 16.
This contestant was placed in the bottom two or three by the judges.
This contestant withdrew from the competition.
This contestant was eliminated after receiving the lowest number of public votes.
The contestant did not perform this week.

=== Top 16 – Celebration (Gala 1) ===
The Celebration Round served as a showcase rather than a competitive stage, with contestants performing without a set theme to celebrate their talent and journey on the show. No eliminations took place during this round.

Top 16 (22–23 November 2025)
Contestant	Song	Result
Hira Qaisar	"Jindiye Hun Te Magroon Leh Ja" (Noor Jehan)	Safe
Rawish Rubab	"Hamari Saanson Mein Aaj Tak" (Noor Jehan)	Safe
Romaisa Tariq	"Sun Ve Bilorri Akh Waliya" (Noor Jehan)	Safe
Merab Javilin	"Bichren Gay Na Hum Kabhi" (Mehnaz & Alamgir)	Safe
Maham Tahir	"Dildar Sadqe Lakhwar Sadqe" (Noor Jehan)	Safe
Tarab Nafees	"Maan Mein Uthi Nayi Tarang" (Noor Jehan)	Safe
Samya Gohar	"Chait Chadya Ke Tenu" (Humaira Channa)	Safe
Nabeel Abbas	"Main Ne Main Kinno Aakhan" (Hamid Ali Bela)	Safe
Rouhan Abbas	"Kyun Door Door" (Shaukat Ali)	Safe
Muhammad Ibrar	"Kya Haal Sunawaan Dil Da" (Pathanay Khan)	Safe
Aryan Naveed	"Tumhe Kaise Bata Doon" (Ahmed Rushdi)	Safe
Rohail Asghar	"Aap Ko Bhool Jayein Hum" (Mehdi Hassan)	Safe
Waqar Hussain	"Yun Zindagi Ki Rah Mein" (Mehdi Hassan)	Safe
Zain Baloch	"Deewanay" (Fuzön)	Safe
Mehtab Ali	"Kameez Teri Kaali" (Attaullah Khan)	Safe
Faryal Amber	N/A	Safe

=== Top 16 – Lyricist Tribute (Gala 2) ===
This round was dedicated to remembering and honouring Pakistani lyricists. Contestants performed songs celebrated for their poetry and lyrical craftsmanship.

Top 16 (7–21 December 2025)
Contestant	Song	Result
Rohail Asghar	"Ve Main Chori Chori" (Attaullah Khan)	Bottom three
Hira Qaisar	"Tere Bina Rogi Hoye" (Nusrat Fateh Ali Khan)	Safe
Mehtab Ali	"Yeh Jo Halka Halka Suroor Hai" (Nusrat Fateh Ali Khan)	Safe
Rawish Rubab	"Nigahein Mila Kar Badal Jane Walay" (Mehnaz Begum)	Safe
Maham Tahir	"Kithe Nain Na Jodi" (Reshma)	Safe
Waqar Hussain	"Kabhi Kabhi Mein Sochta Hoon" (Mehdi Hassan)	Safe
Rouhan Abbas	"Sanwal Mor Muharan" (Salamat Ali Khan)	Safe
Tarab Nafees	"Payal Mein Geet Hain Cham Cham Ke" (Iqbal Bano)	Safe
Muhammad Ibrar	"Dilri Lutti" (Noor Jehan)	Withdrew
Romaisa Tariq	"Dil Mera" (Vital Signs)	Eliminated
Nabeel Abbas	"Ae Dil Kisi Ki Yaad Mein" (Mehdi Hassan)	Safe
Zain Baloch	"Keh Dena" (Atif Aslam)	Safe
Merab Javilin	"Main Jis Din Bhula Dun" (Mehdi Hassan)	Safe
Aryan Naveed	"Hum Chalay Tou Hamare Sang" (Alamgir)	Bottom three
Samya Gohar	"Suno Suno Jo Tum Kaho" (Nayyara Noor)	Safe
Faryal Amber	N/A	Safe
Muhammad Minaam	N/A	Wild Card

=== Top 15 – Ishq (Gala 3) ===
This Gala Round centred on the theme of ishq, featuring predominantly Sufi-inspired performances. Contestants sang qawwali, devotional, and romantic classics associated with themes of love, longing, and transcendence. Farhan Saeed and Shuja Haider appeared as guest judges, while Shahzaman Ali Khan appeared as a guest artist.

Top 15 (3–11 January 2026)
Contestant	Song	Result
Rouhan Abbas	"Maar Gayi Udeek Din Raat Di" (Nusrat Fateh Ali Khan)	Safe
Waqar Hussain	"Sawan Ki Bheegi Raaton Mein" (Nusrat Fateh Ali Khan)	Safe
Maham Tahir	"Ishq Deewana Mera" (Nusrat Fateh Ali Khan)	Safe
Mehtab Ali	"Piya Re Piya Re" (Nusrat Fateh Ali Khan)	Safe
Hira Qaisar	"Meri Zindagi Tera Pyar" (Nusrat Fateh Ali Khan)	Safe
Rohail Asghar	"Kiven Mukhre Ton Nazraan" (Nusrat Fateh Ali Khan)	Safe
Faryal Amber	"Dhol Mahiya" (Nusrat Fateh Ali Khan)	Safe
Zain Baloch	"Dam Mast Qalandar" (Nusrat Fateh Ali Khan)	Safe
Tarab Nafees	"Thora Thora Pyar" (Fariha Pervez)	Safe
Rawish Rubab	"Sanu Nehr Wale Pul" (Noor Jehan)	Safe
Samya Gohar	"Chan Mere Makhna" (Shazia Manzoor)	Safe
Nabeel Abbas	"Allah Allah Kar Bhaiya" (Allan Fakir & Mohammed Ali Shehki)	Safe
Merab Javilin	"Dil Hua Bo Kata" (Fariha Pervez)	Safe
Muhammad Minaam	"Akhiyaan" (Fuzön)	Safe
Aryan Naveed	"Aatish" (Shuja Haider)	Safe

Non-competition performances
Performer	Song
Shahzaman Ali Khan	"Kise Da Yaar Na Vichre" (Nusrat Fateh Ali Khan)
Rahat Fateh Ali Khan	"Lagan Lagi Tumse Mann Ki Lagan" (Rahat Fateh Ali Khan)
Farhan Saeed	"Khat" (Farhan Saeed)
Shuja Haider	"Jind Mahiya" (Traditional)

=== Top 15 – Wedding (Gala 4) ===
The remaining contestants performed iconic wedding songs traditionally associated with Pakistani wedding celebrations. Performances drew from folk, film, and popular music commonly played at maiyun, mehndi, and baraat events across three nights. Abrar-ul-Haq and Asim Raza appeared as guest judges, while Sara Raza Khan and Natasha Baig appeared as guest artists for the week.

Top 15 (10–18 January 2026)
Contestant	Song	Result
Tarab Nafees	"Maiya Main To Bahoni Re" (Reshma)	Safe
Merab Javilin	"Babula Ve" (Afshan)	Safe
Hira Qaisar	"Dhiyan Te Dhan Paraya" (Noor Jehan)	Safe
Maham Tahir	"Madhaniyan" (Musarrat Nazir)	Safe
Nabeel Abbas	"Chaap Tilak" (Ameer Khusro)	Bottom three
Rohail Asghar	"Bismillah Karan" (Nadeem Abbas Lunewala)	Eliminated
Rawish Rubab	"Desan Da Raja" (Naseem Begum)	Eliminated
Rouhan Abbas	"Tere Sehre Nu Sajaya" (Sadiq Saab)	Safe
Mehtab Ali	"Shakar Wanda Re" (Asrar)	Safe
Aryan Naveed	"Haye Dil Bechara" (Jimmy Khan)	Safe
Samya Gohar	"Ik Pal" (Hadiqa Kiyani)	Safe
Zain Baloch	"Mehndi Ki Yeh Raat" (Jawad Ahmed)	Safe
Waqar Hussain	"Duniya Te Pyar Mile" (Noor Jehan)	Safe
Faryal Amber	"Balle Balle" (Shazia Manzoor)	Safe
Muhammad Minaam	"Ambwa Talay Dola" (Bilqees Khanum)	Safe

Non-competition performances
Performer	Song
Sara Raza Khan	"Kahe Ko Beyahi Bede" (Thumri)
Abrar-ul-Haq	"Chamkeeli" (Abrar-ul-Haq)
Natasha Baig	"Barkha" (Natasha Baig)
Natasha Baig	"Yaar Daadhi" (Traditional)

=== Top 13 – Nostalgia (Gala 5) ===
The remaining contestants performed nostalgic songs from earlier decades of Pakistani music, revisiting classics associated with film, pop, and television that evoked a sense of musical reminiscence. Asim Azhar and Mekaal Hasan (of Mekaal Hasan Band), and Bilal Saeed appeared as guest judges for the week.

Top 13 (24–31 January 2026)
Contestant	Song	Result
Mehtab Ali	"Hawa Hawa" (Hassan Jahangir)	Safe
Samya Gohar	"Aag" (Nazia Hassan)	Bottom three
Nabeel Abbas	"Uchiyan Majajaan Wali" (Jawad Ahmed)	Safe
Hira Qaisar	"Jhok Ranjhan" (Meekal Hasan Band)	Safe
Zain Baloch	"Purani Jeans" (Ali Haider)	Safe
Muhammad Minaam	"Deewana" (Faakhir)	Eliminated
Faryal Amber	"Boohay Baariyan" (Hadiqa Kiani)	Safe
Merab Javilin	"Boom Boom" (Nazia & Zoheb)	Safe
Aryan Naveed	"Maahi Ve" (Faakhir)	Safe
Tarab Nafees	"Inteha-e-Shauq" (Hadiqa Kiani)	Safe
Waqar Hussain	"Adhi Adhi Raat" (Bilal Saeed)	Safe
Maham Tahir	"Jugni" (Alam Lohar)	Safe
Rouhan Abbas	"Khair Mangdi" (Bilal Saeed)	Eliminated

Non-competition performances
Performer	Song
Asim Azhar	"Jind Mahi" (Asim Azhar)
Asim Azhar	"Sugar Rush" (Asim Azhar)
Bilal Saeed	"12 Saal" (Bilal Saeed)
Bilal Saeed	"Misunderstood" (Bilal Saeed)

=== Top 11 – Basant (Gala 6) ===
This Gala Round celebrated the theme of Basant, drawing inspiration from springtime festivities traditionally associated with colour, renewal, and folk celebration in Pakistan. Performances typically reflected the joyous and seasonal spirit of Basant through upbeat melodies and classical influences. Shazia Manzoor and Humaira Channa appeared as guest judges.

Top 11 (1–8 February 2026)
Contestant	Song	Result
Hira Qaisar	"Guddi Wangu Sajna" (Afshan)	Safe
Merab Javilin	"Batiyan Bhujai Rakkhdi" (Shazia Manzoor)	Eliminated
Nabeel Abbas	"Ek Phul Motiye Da" (Mansoor Ali Malangi)	Safe
Faryal Amber	"Tha Yaqeen Ke Aayegi" (Naheed Akhtar)	Bottom three
Zain Baloch	"Dholna (Sada Kaliyan)" (Jawad Ahmad)	Safe
Samya Gohar	"Mein Ni Boldi" (Humaira Arshad)	Safe
Aryan Naveed	"Sab Tu Soniye" (Faakhir)	Safe
Mehtab Ali	"Sohniyan Di Beri Utte Guddi Meri" (Shaukat Ali)	Eliminated
Maham Tahir	"Jave Kachiyan Ghariyan" (Azra Jehan)	Safe
Tarab Nafees	"Yeh Rangeeni-E-Naubahar" (Naheed Akhtar)	Safe
Waqar Hussain	"Tak Lende" (Aavish)	Safe

Non-competition performances
Performer	Song
Top 11 Girls	"Sakal Ban" × "Patangbaz" (Basant Medley)
Shazia Manzoor	"Main Neel Karaiyan" (Shazia Manzoor)
Humaira Channa	"Bajaria Se Gajre" (Humaira Channa)
Zeb Bangash	"Badlaan" (Zeb Bangash)

=== Top 9 – Mohabbat (Gala 7) ===
This Gala Round centred on the theme of mohabbat, celebrating classic romantic songs from Pakistani music. The week highlighted themes of love and cross-border musical heritage, commemorating cultural friendship between Pakistan and Bangladesh. Alamgir appeared as a guest judge, while Raja Bashir and Humaira Bashir joined as guest artists for the round.

Top 9 (14–22 February 2026)
Contestant	Song	Result
Nabeel Abbas	"Kia Hai Jo Pyar" (Ahmed Rushdi)	Bottom three
Maham Tahir	"Ve Sone Diya Kangna" (Noor Jehan)	Safe
Aryan Naveed	"Tum Meri Zindagi Ho" (Alamgir)	Safe
Hira Qaisar	"Agar Tum Mil Jao" (Tasawar Khanum)	Safe
Zain Baloch	"Kal Shaam Dekha" (Waris Baig)	Eliminated
Waqar Hussain	"Tere Sang Rehne Ki" (Mehdi Hassan & Naheed Akhtar)	Safe
Samya Gohar	"Tu Hai Dil Ki Dharkan" (A. Nayyar & Mehnaz)	Safe
Tarab Nafees	"Sanware Mose Preet" (Noor Jehan)	Safe
Faryal Amber	"Aap Dil Ki Anjuman Mein" (Runa Laila)	Eliminated

Non-competition performances
Performer	Song
Alamgir	"Mujhe Dil Se Na Bhulana" (Alamgir & Mehnaz)
Raja Bashir & Humaira Bashir	"Amae Bhashaeilli Re" (Traditional)

=== Top 8 – Culture Night (Gala 8) ===
This Gala Round centred on the theme of Culture Night, celebrating the diverse musical traditions and cultural heritage of Pakistan. The round featured performances highlighting regional music and folk traditions from across the country. The gala marked the return of the competition following a lengthy production hiatus. Rouhan Abbas returned to the competition as a wild card contestant. Arif Lohar and Lohar Boys (Ali Lohar and Amir Lohar), Akhtar Channal, the Bugti Brothers, Sanam Marvi, and Khyal Muhammad and his sons appeared as guest artists. No eliminations took place during this round.

Top 8 – Culture Night (9 August 2026)
Contestants	Song	Result
Aryan Naveed & Waqar Hussain	"Larsha Pekhawar" (Traditional)	Safe
Maham Tahir	"Dannah Pa Dannah" (with Akhtar Channal)	Safe
Hira Qaisar& Rouhan Abbas	"Challa" (Inayat Ali)	Safe
Samya Gohar	"Washmallay" (with Bugti Brothers)	Safe
Tarab Nafees & Nabeel Abbas	"Ho Jamalo" (Traditional)	Safe

Non-competition performances
Performer	Song
Top 8	"Yaro Yehi Dosti Hai" (Jupiters)
Zeb Bangash	"Saqi Jaam" (Traditional)
Sanam Marvi	"Allay Munjha Marroara" (Traditional)
Arif Lohar and Lohar Boys	"Jugni" (Alam Lohar)
Khyal Muhammad and sons	"Ya Qurban" (Traditional)

=== Top 8 – Independence Day (Gala 9) ===
This Gala Round centred on the theme of Independence Day, celebrating Pakistan's independence through a selection of patriotic songs. Each contestant performed an individual rendition of a well-known Pakistani patriotic song. Faakhir appeared as a guest judge, while Tanveer Afridi joined as guest artist for the round. No eliminations took place during this round.

Top 8 – Independence Day (16 August 2026)
Contestants	Song	Result
Waqar Hussain	"Mera Paigham Pakistan" (Nusrat Fateh Ali Khan)	Safe
Samya Gohar	"Gawah Rehna" (Nayyara Noor)	Safe
Aryan Naveed	"Tere Bina Dil Na Lagay" (Faakhir)	Safe
Maham Tahir	"Ae Watan Ke Sajeeley Jawano" (Noor Jehan)	Safe
Hira Qaisar	"Ae Puttar Hattan Tay" (Noor Jehan)	Safe
Tarab Nafees	"Sohni Dharti" (Shahnaz Begum)	Safe
Rouhan Abbas	"Ae Watan" (Amanat Ali Khan)	Safe
Nabeel Abbas	"Ae Raah e Haq Ke Shaheedo" (Naseem Begum)	Safe

Non-competition performances
Performer	Song
Top 8	"Hum Zinda Qoum Hain" (The Benjamin Sisters)
Zeb Bangash	"Pankh Laga Ke" (Zeb Bangash)
Faakhir	"I Love Mera Pakistan" (Faakhir)
Tanveer Afridi	"Humse Pehle Bhi" (Tanveer Afridi)

=== Top 8 – Finale (Gala 10) ===
The Finale brought together the Top 8 contestants for the final performances of Pakistan Idol Season 2. With votes accumulated across the previous two galas, the contestants performed for the final time before the results were revealed. Atif Aslam appeared as a guest judge and performer, alongside other special performances throughout the finale. Following the final vote count, Hira Qaisar was crowned the winner, with Aryan Naveed, Maham Tahir, Nabeel Abbas, Rouhan Abbas, Samya Gohar, Tarab Nafees and Waqar Hussain finishing as runners-up.

Finale – Top 8 (23 August 2026)
Contestants	Song	Result
Hira Qaisar	"Zindagi Tamasha Bani" (Afshan)	Winner
Aryan Naveed	"Roya Re" (Shiraz Uppal)	Runner-up
Maham Tahir	"Mahi Yaar Di Gharoli" (Abida Parveen)	Runner-up
Nabeel Abbas	"Zaroori Tha" (Rahat Fateh Ali Khan)	Runner-up
Rouhan Abbas	"Yaad Piya Ki Aaye" (Bade Ghulam Ali Khan)	Runner-up
Samya Gohar	"Dil Dharke Main Tumse" (Runa Laila)	Runner-up
Tarab Nafees	"Jee Janta Hai" (Noor Jehan)	Runner-up
Waqar Hussain	"Tere Bin Nahi Lagda" (Nusrat Fateh Ali Khan)	Runner-up

Non-competition performances
Performer	Song
Bilal Maqsood with Top 8 Boys	"Urnay Ko Dil Chahay" (Bilal Maqsood)
Zeb Bangash with Top 8 Girls	"Rona Chorh Diya" (Zeb & Haniya)
Atif Aslam	"Aadat" (Atif Aslam)
Atif Aslam	"Woh Lamhe" (Atif Aslam)
Atif Aslam	"Sun Sajna" (Atif Aslam)
Atif Aslam	"Subha Aye Na" (Atif Aslam)

== Elimination chart ==
Did not perform
Saved by the judges' scores
Wild Card
Bottom two or three
Eliminated
Withdrew

Pakistan Idol (season 2) – Eliminations
Contestant	Pl.	Top 16		Top 15		Top 13	Top 11	Top 9	Top 8		
Contestant	Pl.	Gala 1 (Note: There was no elimination during this gala. Votes were carried forward and accumulated across multiple galas, with contestants ultimately eliminated based on their cumulative vote totals.)	Gala 2	Gala 3	Gala 4	Gala 5	Gala 6	Gala 7	Gala 8	Gala 9	Finale
Hira	1	Safe	Safe	Safe	Safe	Safe	Safe	Safe	Safe	Safe	Winner
Aryan	2	Safe	Bottom three	Safe	Safe	Safe	Safe	Safe	Safe	Safe	Runner-up
Maham	2	Safe	Safe	Safe	Safe	Safe	Safe	Safe	Safe	Safe	Runner-up
Nabeel	2	Safe	Safe	Safe	Bottom three	Safe	Safe	Bottom three	Safe	Safe	Runner-up
Rouhan	2	Safe	Safe	Safe	Safe	Eliminated			Wild Card	Safe	Runner-up
Samya	2	Safe	Safe	Safe	Safe	Bottom three	Safe	Safe	Safe	Safe	Runner-up
Tarab	2	Safe	Safe	Safe	Safe	Safe	Safe	Safe	Safe	Safe	Runner-up
Waqar	2	Safe	Safe	Safe	Safe	Safe	Safe	Safe	Safe	Safe	Runner-up
Faryal	9	N/A (Note: Faryal Amber did not perform this week due to illness.)	N/A	Safe	Safe	Safe	Bottom three	Eliminated			
Zain	9	Safe	Safe	Safe	Safe	Safe	Safe	Eliminated			
Mehtab	11	Safe	Safe	Safe	Safe	Safe	Eliminated				
Merab	11	Safe	Safe	Safe	Safe	Safe	Eliminated				
Minaam	13		Wild Card	Safe	Safe	Eliminated					
Rawish	14	Safe	Safe	Safe	Eliminated						
Rohail	14	Safe	Bottom three	Safe	Eliminated						
Romaisa	16	Safe	Eliminated								
Ibrar		Safe	Withdrew (Note: Ibrar withdrew from the competition citing "unfair practices".)								

== Controversies ==
In December 2025, the competition was involved in a public dispute when M. Ibrar Shahid, a Top 16 contestant and student at the National College of Arts, announced his withdrawal from the show. Shahid released a statement alleging that the production environment was "toxic" and that the show engaged in "unfair practices."

Shahid specifically claimed that the production team used heavy audio manipulation on his performances without his consent, asserting that the show was "scripted" to favor certain contestants over others He further alleged that the management threatened him with legal action when he raised concerns about the integrity of the competition.

The Pakistan Idol production team issued a formal rebuttal, characterizing Shahid's allegations as false and defamatory. The management stated that the program follows the international standards set by Fremantle and the show's editing processes were standard for the reality TV format and that Shahid's claims were an attempt to discredit the platform after his voluntary exit.
