= Pakistan Idol season 1 =

Premiered on Geo on 6 December 2013

Pakistan Idol
- Season 1
- Hosted by: Mohib Mirza; Anoushey Ashraf
- Judges: Hadiqa Kiani; Ali Azmat; Bushra Ansari
- Winner: Zamad Baig
- Runner-up: Muhammad Shoaib

Release
- Original network: Geo TV
- Original release: December 6, 2013 – April 27, 2014

Season chronology
- Next → Season 2

The first season of Pakistan Idol premiered on Geo on 6 December 2013 (under the full title Pakistan Idol: Jo Hai Dil Ki Awaz) and continued until 24 April 2014 created by Simon Fuller. It was won by Zamad Baig. The first season was hosted by Mohib Mirza, while Anoushey Ashraf joined in semi-finals and also hosted the spin-off show Pakistan Idol-Sur Ka Safar.

The show follows the same Idols format comprising fourteen-weeks from auditions to semi-finals and grand finale. The show aired two weekly episodes at the 21:00 PST prime-time slot. The judges panel for the first season included Ali Azmat, Hadiqa Kiani and Bushra Ansari.

The first season set a record for gathering 1 million votes for finale. On 27 April 2014, Zamad Baig won the first season of Pakistan Idol, Muhammad Shoaib was the runner-up.

== Regional Auditions ==
Audition took Place at following places, listing is in order of episode airing date:

Episode Air Date	Audition City	Date	Audition Venues	References	Golden Tickets
6 December 2013; 8 December 2013	Lahore, Punjab	28–30 September 2013	Shalimar Tower Hotel, Avenues Marquees, DHA Phase 5		16
13 December 2013	Multan, Punjab	5–7 October 2013	UCL-TILS University		09
15 December 2013	Faisalabad, Punjab	24 September 2013	Royalton Hotel		11
20 December 2013	Peshawar, KPK	26 September 2013	Galaxy Complex		13
20 December 2013	Sukkur, Sindh	9 October 2013	Red Carpet Hotel		01
22 December 2013	Islamabad, ICT	19–20 September 2013	The Centaurus, Pak-China Friendship Centre		18
27 December 2013; 29 December 2013	Karachi, Sindh	19–21 October 2013	Beach Luxury Hotel		13
CLEAR Last chance audition winners			Online Registration Process		05
Total number of tickets to Karachi					86

In addition, Pakistan Idol auditions held at Hunza, Swat and Gwadar. The response of the people at auditions was hugely positive, around 20,000 plus people went out for audition, In Lahore due to the large number of auditionees the audition days extended two more days, the enthusiasm of people in Faisalabad and Multan was exceptionally extravagant. At Hunza, Swat and Gwadar auditions took place where a majority of girls appears for audition, In Sukhur, Hyderabad and Karachi auditions took place for three days.

=== Clear Last Chance Auditions ===
Pakistan Idol shows extravagant and sterling attainments, the Presenter and major sponsor of the series CLEAR offers another last chance for online auditions on its official Facebook page for the people who missed the chance to get auditioned. A port block was set open from 26 October 2013 to 8 November 2013 on page to post a five minutes video and audio clips of the singing of desired auditionees. Previous auditionees were also able to take part once again. Online selected contestants names were posted on a Facebook page after selection and CLEAR called them to Karachi for final selection. Through this procedure a total of 12 contestants was selected from which a total of five was finalized by the series judges.

=== Audition Structure ===
There are usually three stages in the audition process in every season, the first round being the open call audition advertised. Desired auditionees register themselves via SMS, and then called for audition at the venue, each person registered sings briefly in front of the judges, with those who gain at least two yeses from the three judges then receiving a Golden Ticket to Karachi. In the second round all the selected participants are brought to Karachi, for final auditions, where they first sing in a group of four or five in front of judges. Most of those who attended are eliminated at this stage with only a limited number of auditionees selected to proceed further. In the Third round selected participants have to sing in duos and trios. Here further selection occurs and more participants drop out. Only the final 30 made their way to the semi-finals round with the last final 12 or 13 selected for the game race and then this will be the only phase of the game where the audience select the fate of final contestants.

In the first season, the second and third stage of the audition took place within a single day, but in the following seasons each stage of the audition may take place on separate days. The initial audition venue need not necessarily be the final audition venue in front of the judges, and in later seasons, up to three separate venues may be used for the auditions in each city. The venues and dates of the second audition in front of the producers are not specifically listed in these pages.

== Theater Round ==
=== Groups Performance ===
After the regional auditions, 86 contestants were selected to perform in Karachi in a series of rounds designed to eliminate further singers and narrow the pool. The first theatre round involved group performances where a selected group of four to five contestants was asked to sing in front of the judges, albeit individually and not as a group. From amongst these contestants, the pool of contenders was narrowed down to 35 contestants. The selected contestants were asked to perform the next day in the second theatre round – the duets and trios.

=== Duo's and Trio's ===
The rest of the best 35 advanced singers sung duos and trios in front of judges, in order to check their coordination and ability to sing with partners. A series of auditions occur, where fewer contestants made their way to the last and final round of theater.

=== Solo performance with Music Track ===
The selected contestants from previous rounds enter into the third and final phase, where they have to perform as a solo performer with a music track. A series of performances occur and judges selected the final top 24 contestants for the piano round.

== Top 24 Contestants ==
The following 24-Top Semi-finalist were selected from a total of 86. These contestants enter into Semi-final stage where the top 24-finalists will compete to reach a place of the final 12-Contestants, and from them the winner of the show will declared. One of the Top 24 contestants Nazish walks out due to her father's deteriorating health condition therefore eliminated contestant, Ghazal Ali, was selected to replace Nazish in the top 24.

Order	Contestant	age at time of show	Occupation	Hometown	audition location	About the Contestant
1	Ghazal Ali	21	Teacher	Karachi	Karachi, Sindh	Ghazal is a school teacher, born and brought up in Karachi. She is a trained singer and has already taken part in various singing competitions and even reached the quarter-finals of a national singing competition.
2	Fayeza Rashid	24	Make-up Artist	Lahore	Lahore, Punjab	By profession Fayeza is a Make-up artist, she has been passionate about singing since she was a child and has received a lot of support for this from her mother and elder sister, who is a trained singer.
3	Mahwish Maqsood	26	Stage-Singer	Lahore	Lahore, Punjab	Mehwish is a trained classical singer, She has already performed on PTV's show Virsa Heritage and she has great interest in Sufi music.
4	Sana Zulfiqar	19	Television Playback-singer	Lahore	Lahore, Punjab	Sana Zulfiqar has been singing professionally for three years. 19-year-old singer has sung as a playback singer for many famous drama serials for various TV channels and has performed on several morning shows, including Geo's Utha Jago Geo.
5	Rose Marie	15	Student	Karachi	Karachi, Sindh	Hails from Karachi, Rose is a trained classical singer and being training from the age of 7, she won many singing competitions. She was in the Top 5 of the Indo-Pak famous singing reality competition Chhote Ustaad.
6	Fiza Javed Abbasi	24	Music Teacher	Karachi	Karachi, Sindh	An undergrad of CBM, Karachi, Fiza Javed Abbasi has been singing since she was four. She has not received any training but has evolved over the years as a singer.
7	Midhat Hidayat	15	Matriculation Student	Karachi	Karachi, Sindh	Midhat is a matriculation student and has never received training in music, though her passion and zeal about singing took her to the idol journey.
8	Muhammad Shoaib	23	Journalist	Qissa Khawani, Peshawar	Peshawar, KPK	Hails from Qissa Khawani and lives in Peshawar, Shoaib is a journalist and has worked as a producer on the radio as well as TV. He has also worked for the print media. He has no training in music.
9	Ali Rizwan	29	University Student	Faisalabad	Faisalabad, Punjab	Rizwan is currently doing a masters in Islamiyat Studies, his interest in music and sheer voice make him a singer.
10	Waqas Ali Vicky	22	journalist	Mian Channu, Khanewal, Punjab	Islamabad, ICT	Coming from a tiny small area of Punjab, Waqas is a journalist, though Vicky has not received any formal training he has set his base being the lead vocalist of his own band Sargam which performs at local events.
11	Zamad Baig	21	Film-Maker	Mandi Bahauddin	Lahore, Punjab	Zammad is currently studying film making and wanted to become a play-back singer, he trained himself in a Sufi-rock genre without supervision of music mentors and maestros.
12	Seemab Arshad	19	Student	Lahore	Lahore, Pumjab	Seemab hails from Lahore and is a student of ACC and wanted to become a chartered accountant, at the same time his extravagant interest in music urged him to become a singer.
13	Kashif Ali	21	Singer	Lahore	Lahore, Punjab	Kashif started his singing career at the age of 5, till then he had no professional training in music, wanting to become a cricketer, but his zenith in music took him into another world.
14	M. Yasir Khan	20	Student	Lahore	Lahore, Punjab	A student of accountancy and an only child of his Pathani descent family, Yasir is passionate about singing without having any training. He is a melodious singer.
15	Umer Aftab	23	Student	Lahore	Lahore, Punjab	Hails from the family of politics and media, Umer is a B.com student and has not trained in music. His grandfather was a director. He wanted to join politics after achieving fame from the show.
16	Asad Raza Sonu	26	Marketing Executive officer	Islamabad	Islamabad, ICT	Asad is a Marketing Executive officer in a firm of ISB, he holds a job with a strict schedule of 12-hours, despite that his passion of singing never dampened his zeal to become a singer. With the support of family and his firm CEO he took time off to participate in the race.
17	Muhammad Zeeshan Ali	26	Singer/Composer	Islamabad	Islamabad, ICT	Zeeshan has never received any formal training in singing, though he has competed in singing competitions before coming to Pakistan Idol. He stood runner-up in one of these competitions.
18	Shamir Aziz Quidwai	23	Engineer	Islamabad	Islamabad, ICT	By profession Shamir is an electrical engineer, without training in singing he has been participating in singing shows throughout his life.
19	Waqas Ali	25	Music Teacher	Rawalpindi Punjab	Islamabad, ICT	Waqas hails from Rawalpindi, is a Music teacher and owns a small music studio. He started his singing career with play-back in PTV drama serial Suraq.
20	Waqar Ehsin	29	Student	Islamabad	Islamabad, ICT	Currently Waqar is a student of economics, his passion for music has made him take time off from studies to compete for the Pakistan Idol.
21	Abd-ul-Ahad Khan	26	Singer/Actor	Karachi	Karachi, Sindh	Ahad is an MBA, but his interest in singing put him on a path to a singing career. He has won several music competitions at regional level. He is also an actor.
22	Syed Ali Asad Zaidi	25	Commerce Student	Karachi	Karachi, Sindh	Ali is a commerce student and has no training in music. He has won two singing competitions at national level of Pakistan.
23	Syed Sajid Abbas	20	Copywriter	Karachi	Karachi, Sindh	Sajid is a professional copywriter and currently studying media. He is trained in semi-classical by Ustad Urooj Khan. In 2010 Sajid competed in LG Awaaz Banaye Star in which he was a runner-up.
24	Abdul Rafay Khan	16	Music Student	Karachi	Karachi, Sindh	Rafay is being training as a singer from Karachi's National Academy of Performing Arts (NAPA) and is currently a third year student there.

== Semi-finalists ==
Following is the list of semi-finalists who failed to reach the finals:

Contestant	Age at time of show	Hometown	Audition location
Abd-ul-Ahad Khan	26	Karachi	Karachi, Sindh
M. Yasir Khan	20	Lahore	Lahore, Punjab
Umer Aftab	23	Lahore	Lahore, Punjab
Seemab Arshad	19	Karachi	Karachi, Sindh
Waqar Ehsin	29	Islamabad	Islamabad, ICT
Ali Rizwan	29	Faisalabad	Faisalabad, Punjab

Contestant	Age at time of show	Hometown	Audition location
M. Zeeshan Ali	26	Islamabad	Islamabad, ICT
Fayeza Rashid	24	Lahore	Lahore, Punjab
Ghazal Ali	21	Karachi	Karachi, Sindh
Fiza Javed	24	Karachi	Karachi, Sindh
Midhat Hidayat	15	Karachi	Karachi, Sindh

== Semi-finals ==
The contestants who reached this stage called Piano Round were referred to in the show as the Top 24 finalists. As of this season, the contestants performed in front of a small studio audience, with orchestra accompaniment on backing tape, in a group of eight. From each three groups of eight contestants, three contestants were selected on the basis of audience votes and one selected by judges' choice, by providing a last chance performance of any two contestants from the eliminated ones, while the rest of the contestants are eliminated periodically.

From the Top 24, 13 contestants competed for the finals.

=== Group 1 ===
Order	Contestant	Song (original artist)	Result
1	Fiza Javed Abbasi	"Lambi Judai"(Reshma)	Wild Card
2	Waqas Ali Vicky	"Hath Se Hath" (Sonu Nigam)	Saved by Judges
3	Waqar Ahsan	"Ankhon Kay Sagar" (Fuzön)	Wild Card
4	Abd-ul-Ahad Khan	"Na kaho... Na Suno" (Aaroh)	Eliminated
5	Rose Marry	"Bahon Main Chale Aao" (Lata Mangeshkar)	Advanced
6	Syed Sajid Abbas	"Aa Mere Pyaar Ki Khushboo" (Ustad Amanat Ali Khan)	Advanced
7	Waqas Ali	"Aik Haseena Thi" (Kishore Kumar)	Advanced
8	Midhat Hidaya	"Lag Ja Gale Se" (Lata Mangeshkar)	Wild Card

=== Group 2 ===
Order	Contestant	Song (original artist)	Result
1	Kashif Ali	"Maula Maula Maula Mere Maula" (Javed Ali)	Wild Card
2	M. Yasir Khan	"Pehla Nasha... Pehla Khumar" (Udit Narayan)	Eliminated
3	Mehwish Maqsood	"Dil Mera Muft Ka" (Nandini Srikar)	Saved by Judges
4	Muhammad Shoaib	"Kisay Da Yaar" (Nusrat Fateh Ali Khan)	Advanced
5	Ali Rizwan	"Zara Si Dil Main De Jaga Tu" (K.K.)	Wild Card
6	Muhammad Zeeshan Ali	"Bachna Ae Haseeno" (Kishore Kumar)	Wild Card
7	Sana Zulfiqar	"Mere Dil De Sheeshe Wich" (Noor Jehan)	Advanced
8	Abd-ul-Rafey Khan	"Abhi Mujh Mein Kahin" (Sonu Nigam)	Advanced

=== Group 3 ===
Order	Contestant	Song (original artist)	Result
1	Syed Ali Asad Zaidi	"Main Nu Tere Naal"(Najam Sheraz)	Saved by Judges
2	Umar Aftab	"Sawan Beeto Jaye Biharwa"(Fuzön)	Eliminated
3	Fayeza Rashid	"Hai O Rabba Nae O Lagda"(Reshma)	Eliminated
4	Asad Raza Sonu	"Us ka Hi Bana Jab Bana"(Arijit Singh)	Advanced
5	Shamir Aziz Quidwai	"Garaj Baras Sawan Ghir Aye"(Ali Azmat)	Advanced
6	Seemab Arshad	"Yeh Honsla Kaise Ruke"(Shafqat Amanat Ali)	Wild Card
7	Ghazal Ali	"Namak Ishq Ka"(Rekha Bhardwaj)	Wild Card
8	Zammad Baig	"Kali Kali Zulfoon"(Nusrat Fateh Ali Khan)	Advanced

=== Wild Card Round ===
Following those 12 singers advancing on Sunday, 26 January, eight of the remaining 12 eliminated semi-finalists were selected by the judges to compete in the Wild Card Round. Wild Card round began the next week after the announcement of twelve finalists. Following another performance by each Wild Card contender, the audience votes selected ONE contestant to advance to the final group of 13.

Order	Contestant	Song (original artist)	Result
1	Waqar Ahsan	"Lagan Lagi" (Sukhvinder Singh)	Eliminated
2	Ghazal Ali	"Ja Ja Main Tau Say Nahin Boloon" (Noor Jehan)	Eliminated
3	Ali Rizwan	"Mora Jiya Na Lagey" (Amanat Ali Khan)	Eliminated
4	Muhammad Zeeshan Ali	"Teriyan Ve Main Teriyan" (Amanat Ali)	Eliminated
5	Fiza Javaid	"Sajna Ve Sajna" (Sunidhi Chauhan)	Eliminated
6	Midhat Hidayat	"Ni Main Samajh Gayi" (Richa Sharma)	Eliminated
7	Seemab Arshad	"Sanwal Mor Moharan" (Salamat Ali Khan)	Eliminated
8	Kashif Ali	"Sayyan" (Kailash Kher)	Advanced

== Finalists ==
Place	Contestants	Age ^{1}	About the contestants
1	Zamad Baig	21	Hails from Mandi Bahauddin, He auditioned in Lahore and performed "Yeh Jo Halka Halka Suroor Hai" Fakhir version. He got critical acclaim and was selected for Galas. Zammad studied filmmaking but due to interest in music he left it and focuses on Rock-classical singing. His music influences includes Ali Azmat and Nusrat Fateh Ali Khan. Zammad was announced the winner of the first season on 27 April 2014. Zamad coronation song will be announced soon.
2	Muhammad Shoaib	23	Hails from Peshawar, He is a journalist but left his job to be on Idol, he has no training in music. He safely fled from the Piano Round by achieving public votes. He sang "Kisi Da Yaar Na Vichre" in galas and was critiqued positively. His music influence is Nusrat Fateh Ali Khan. Muhammad Shoaib was announced and became the Runner-up of season 1, on 27 April 2014.
3	Syed Ali Asad Zaidi	25	Hails from Karachi, He is a student of commerce but dropped out to take part in Pakistan Idol. Asad has no training in music, but he trained himself as a rock singer. He fuses different melodies and sung as a single. He was appreciated throughout from auditions to finals. Asad was eliminated during Piano Round but was saved by judges using their judges' choice for contestants in each group of three. His music influences are Ustad Nusrat Fateh Ali Khan, Michael Jackson, Muhammad Rafi and Kishore Kumar. Ali is eliminated on 20 March 2014, while Zamad Baig and Muhammad Shoaib secure positions in the Top 2.
4	Kashif Ali	21	Hails from Lahore and has no training in music, but trained himself as a folk classical singer. Kashif was eliminated in Galas round of Group 2, but was selected in Wild Card round by achieving the highest votes. His singing style is often described as emotional and powerful. He sang "Sayyan" by Kailash Kher in Wild Card and received ultimately a positive response from the audience. He is influenced by singing stars like Shafqat Amanat Ali, Sajjad Ali and Kailash Kher. Kashif is eliminated on 13 April 2014 after facing public votes.
5	Rose Mary	15	Hails from Karachi, She is the youngest among all contestants. Rose is a student of matriculation but takes a break to compete in Pakistan Idol. She is a trained classical singer and had been a part of Indo-Pak reality television Chhote Ustaad, eliminated at fourth place. Initially Rose missed the last auditions of Pakistan Idol held in Karachi, but later due to Clear Last Chance Auditions she got a chance. Rose Performed "Bahon Mein Chale Aao" by Lata Mangeshkar in the semi-finals and was critiqued positively. Rose is eliminated on 6 April 2014 after facing public votes.
6	Abdul Rafay Khan	16	Hails from Karachi and auditioned in Karachi. Rafay is training as a singer from Karachi's National Academy of Performing Arts (NAPA) and is currently a third year student there, however he dropped out to take part in Pakistan Idol. He sang "Abhi Mujh Mein Kahin" by Sonu Nigam and got highly positive and favourable response from both the judges and audience. His influences are Sonu Nigam and Rahat Fateh Ali Khan. Rafay is eliminated on 30 March 2014, after facing the Bottom 2, having the fewest public votes.
7	Waqas Ali Vicky	21	Hails from Mian Channu. He is a journalist and auditioned in Islamabad. He has no training in music but he trained himself as a singer. His influences are the classical genre. Coming from a small town he became a big name after being a finalist. He sang "Hath Se Hath" by Sonu Nigam and was eliminated in the Piano Round of Group 1, but saved by judges. He idolizes Sonu Nigam as his singing idol. Waqas is eliminated on 23 March 2014 after facing public votes.
8	Shameer Aziz Quidwai	23	Hails from Islamabad, Shameer is an electrical engineer but left this profession for singing. Shameer's influences are Pop rock and was criticized for not being versatile. He was auditioned in the ISB auditions. His music influences include Ali Azmat, Alamgir and Imran Momina. He celebrated his birthday on Pakistan Idol in episode 9. Shameer was eliminated on 16 March 2014, after receiving fewer votes than Syed Ali Asad Zaidi.
9	Asad Raza Sonu	26	Hails from Islamabad, Asad is a marketing executive officer in an ISB firm. He hold a job with a strict schedule of 12-hours, despite that it never dampened his zeal to become a singer. With the support of family and his firm CEO, he took time off to participate in the race. He influenced Muhammad Rafi as his singing mentor, Despite having no training in music, he keeps his passion in music alive. Asad Raza was eliminated on 9 March 2014, after facing public votes.
10	Sana Zulfiqar	19	Hails from Lahore, Sana auditioned in Lahore. She performed a Noor Jehan Song. In the semi-finals Sana's voice developed hoarseness but she received a positive response from judges and audience alike. Before Idol Sana did playback singing in many Pakistani Television serials and provided her voice in many morning shows' vocals. Her music influences include Noor Jehan, Iqbal Bano and Farida Khanum. Sana is eliminated on 2 March 2014 after facing public votes, alongside Rose and Shamir who secure their position and reconcile with Top 9.
11	Syed Sajid Abbas	20	Hails from Karachi, Hials from singing family, he is trained in classical singing, by profession he is a copywriter, but left her job due to show. He sang well in Galas and was saved by audience. His music influenced are Amanat Ali Khan and Mehdi Hassan. Sajid is eliminated on 23 February 2014 and came at eleventh place, like previous eliminations Sajid Abbas elimination was also unexpected, which makes judges and contestants nostalgic and doleful.
12	Waqas Ali	25	Hails from Islamabad, He is a trained singer and worked as a music teacher. Before Idol he was working in the TV industry and had sung many OST's of different serials. He auditioned in ISB and got a favourable response. He performed "Ek Haseena Thi" in the Piano Round and was selected after achieving audience votes. His music influences include Mohammad Rafi and Kishore Kumar. Following Mehwish, Waqas is eliminated on 16 February 2014 and finished at twelfth place. Waqas was the second contestant to be eliminated in the finals, with his unexpected elimination making judges forlorn and doleful.
13	Mehwish Maqsood	24	Hails from Lahore, Mehwish prior to Idol worked as a stage-show performer and in many folk-festivals such as Virsa. Her voice texture is often compared with Abida Parveen by judges. She trained herself as a folk-singer, auditioned in Lahore and was eliminated in the semi-finals Piano Round of Group-2, but saved by judges using judge's choice for the fourth contestant in each group. She was eliminated on 9 February 2014 and came at thirteenth place. Mehwish was the first contestant to be eliminated in the finals. Her music influence was Abida Parveen.

^Note 1: Ages provided above against each contestant is their age during the season, all ages are confirmed from reliable source.

== Finals ==
As of first season, maintaining the Idol series format, there are 14 weeks of the finals and 13 finalists, with one finalist eliminated per week based on the Pakistan public's votes. Friday day of the series is of performance day and Sunday day of series is results day for each contestant who had perform.

Kashif Ali was announced as a 13 finalists among the chosen wildcard by Judges, after achieving highest public votes.

=== Top 13 – 60s and 70s Hits of Pakistani Music ===
On 7 February 2014, the final race of the series started between 13 finalists, starting with the first week, the theme set as Retro Music of Pakistan, all the contestants performed 1970s and 60s hit songs of Pakistani Legends of Music like Ahmad Rushdi, Mehdi Hassan, Noor Jehan, Masood Rana and Naseem Nazli. As a result, from the Bottom 3, whoever received the fewest votes is eliminated. Mehwish Maqsood, Waqas Ali and Shoaib received minimum votes and are in the Bottom 3, among them Mehwish was voted out due to receiving the fewest votes.

Order	Contestant	Song (original artist)	Result
1	Rose Mary	"Chandni Raatein" (Mala / Noor Jehan)	Safe
2	Shameer Aziz Quidwai	"Jaisay Jantay Nahin" (Ahmad Rushdi)	Safe
3	Waqas Ali	"Mere dil se zindagi bhar" (Mehdi Hassan)	Bottom 3
4	Syed Ali Asad Zaidi	"Duniya Kisi Kay pyar Main" (Mehdi Hassan)	Safe
5	Muhammad Shoaib	"Ranjish Hi Sahi" (Mehdi Hassan)	Bottom 3
6	Mehwish Maqsood	"Bawri Chakori" (Noor Jehan)	Eliminated
7	Zamad Baig	"Kia Hai Jo Pyar" (Ahmad Rushdi)	Safe
8	Waqas Ali Vicky	"Aab Kay Bichray Tou Shayad Kabhi" (Mehdi Hassan)	Safe
9	Abd-ul-Rafay Khan	"Pyar Bhare Do Sharmile Nain" (Mehdi Hassan)	Safe
10	Syed Sajid Abbas	"Socha Tha Pyar Na Karein Ge" (Ahmad Rushdi)	Safe
11	Asad Raza Sonu	"Jab Koi Pyar Se Bulaye Ga" (Mehdi Hassan)	Safe
12	Sana Zulfiqar	"Sada Hun Apne Pyar Ki" (Noor Jehan/Anarkali)	Safe
13	Kashif Ali	"Bhul Jaan Gham Duniya De" (Masood Rana)	Safe

- Adieu Performance by Mehwish Maqsood: "Kya Hal Sunawan Dil Da"

=== Top 12 – Love ===
All the Top 12 performed by following theme which was set as Love theme on the occasion of Valentines Day. Waqas Ali eliminated by facing public votes among Sana Zulfiqar and Waqas ALi Vicky in bottom 3. Eradication of Waqas leaves a huge impact on public votings image, judge Bushra Ansari enlighten the criticism they faced by public and criticized public voting titanically in negative response.

Order	Contestant	Song (original artist)	Result
1	Waqas Ali	"Tumhein Jo Maine Dekha" (Abhijeet Bhattacharya / Shreya Ghoshal)	Eliminated
2	Zammad Baig	"Kivain Mukhre Tu Nazran Hatawan" (Nusrat Fateh Ali Khan)	Safe
3	Asad Raza Suno	"Kabhi Jo Baadal Barse" (Arjit Singh)	Safe
4	Sana Zulfiqar	"ye Mera Dil Pyar Ka Deewana" (Sunidhi Chauhan)	Bottom 3
5	Kashif Ali	"Sohni Lagdi Mainu Sohni Lagdi" (Sajjad Ali)	Safe
6	Shameer Aziz Quidwai	"Tum Hi Ho" (Arjit Singh)	Safe
7	Muhammad Shoaib	"Afreen Afreen" (Nusrat Fateh Ali Khan)	Safe
8	Abd-ul-Rafay Khan	"Dil Sambhal Ja Zara" (Muhammad Irfan)	Safe
9	Syed Sajid Abbas	"Aaj Kal Tere Mere Pyar Ke Charche" (Muhammad Rafi / Suman Kalyanpur)	Safe
10	Rose Mary	"Ye Ishq Haye" (Shreya Ghoshal)	Safe
11	Waqas Ali Vicky	"Gustakh Dil Tere" (Sonu Nigam)	Bottom 3
12	Syed Asad Ali Zaidi	"Tera Honay Laga Hun" (Atif Aslam / Alisha Chinoy)	Safe

- Adieu performance by Waqas Ali: "Tarap Tarap ke Is Dil Se"

=== Top 11 – Pakistani Pop Music ===
All the contestants performed on the theme Pakistani pop music of 90s and present direction. Top 11 contestants sang songs from the hit albums of Pakistani pop singers. Pop rock singer Goher Mumtaz appears on sets in order to promote his serial Uff Yeh Mohabbat and to encourage the contestants. Syed Sajid Abbas is eliminated after getting lower votes than Sana Zulfiqar and Zammad Baig.

- Guest Mentor: Sajjad Ali

Order	Contestant	Song (original artist)	Result
1	Abd-ul-Rafay Khan	"Akhiyan Tu Hole Hole" (Fuzön)	Safe
2	Syed Ali Asad Zaidi	"Sar Kiye Ye Pahar" (Strings)	Safe
3	Rose Mary	"Dupatta Mera Malmal Da" (Hadiqa Kiyani)	Safe
4	Muhammad Shoaib	"Kaho Na Kaho" (Amir Jamal)	Safe
5	Waqas Ali Vicky	"Kheriyan De Naal" (Shafqat Amanat Ali)	Safe
6	Kashif Ali	"Har Zulm Tera Yaad Hai" (Sajjad Ali)	Safe
7	Shamir Aziz Quidwai	"Zinda Hoon" (Faisal Kapadia)	Safe
8	Asad Raza Suno	"In Se Nain Mila" (Najam Sheraz)	Safe
9	Zammad Baig	"Khwaab" (Junoon)	Bottom 3
10	Syed Sajid Abbas	"Aasman Ko Chootay Jain" (Ali Zafar)	Eliminated
11	Sana Zulfiqar	"Haniya Dil Jaaniyan" (Fariha Pervez)	Bottom 3

- Adieu performance by Syed Sajid Abbas: "Maa"

=== Top 10 – Songs of Memories ===
All the participant give tribute to Pepsi-a leading sponsor of Pakistani reality competitions since 90s. With the theme being set, contestants had to perform the songs of their memories. Sana, Shamir and Rose were put in the danger zone as Bottom 3 having fewer votes than the others. Sana is eliminated after facing public votes while Shamir and Rose join the Top 9.

Order	Contestant	Song (original artist)	Result
1	Waqas Ali Vicky	"Sapno se Bhare Naina" (Shankar Mahadevan)	Safe
2	Zammad Baig	"Teri Deewani" (Kailash Kher)	Safe
3	Shamir Aziz Quidwai	"In Fizaon Se" (Najam Sheraz)	Bottom 3
4	Sana Zulfiqar	"Kehta Hai Baabul" (Jagjit Singh / Amitabh Bachchan)	Eliminated
5	Abd-ul-Rafay Khan	"Maa Mujhe Apne Aanchal" (Lata Mangeshkar)	Safe
6	Syed Ali Asad Zaidi	"Nadaan Parindey" (A. R. Rahman)	Safe
7	Muhammad Shoaib	"Albela Sajan Aayo Ri" (Sultan Ali Khan / Shankar Mahadevan / Kavita Krishnamurthy)	Safe
8	Asad Raza Suno	"Ab Tu Aadat" (Atif Aslam)	Safe
9	Rose Mary	"Baba Ki Rani Hoon" (Alka Yagnik)	Bottom 3
10	Kashif Ali	"Naina Thag Lenge" (Rahat Fateh Ali Khan)	Safe

- Adieu performance by Sana Zulfiqar: "Mere Maula Karam Ho Karam"

=== Top 9 – Party Music ===
All contestants performed on a theme of Party Music. Alamgir was a guest mentor for week five. Asad Raza Suno, Shamir and Zammad comes in danger zone and Asad is eliminated after facing public votes, his unexpected elimination leave a huge impact on show format.

- Guest Mentor: Alamgir Haq

Order	Contestant	Song (original artist)	Result
1	Asad Raza Suno	"Dekha Tujhe Tu Yaar" (Mika Singh)	Eliminated
2	Rose Marry	"Parda" (Sunidhi Chauhan / Rana Mazumdar)	Safe
3	Waqas ALi Vicky	"Jeene kay Hain Chaar Din" (Sunidhi Chauhan / Sonu Nigam)	Safe
4	Kashif Ali	"Main Tere Agal Bagal" (Mika Singh)	Safe
5	Muhammad Shoaib	"Na Na Na Na Re Na" (Daler Mehndi / Sudesh Bhonsle)	Safe
6	Abd-ul-Rafay Khan	"Bijuriya Bijuriya" (Sonu Nigam)	Safe
7	Shamir Aziz Quidwai	"Aaja Aaja Dil Nichode" (Sukhwinder Singh / Vishal Dadlani)	Bottom 3
8	Zamad Baig	"Tu Mera Hero" (Mika Singh / Shefali Alvares)	Bottom 3
9	Ali Asad Zaidi	"Badtameez Dil Maane Na" (Benny Dayal / Shefali Alvares)	Safe

- Adieu performance by Asad Raza Sonu: "Main Dhondne ko Zamane"

=== Top 8 – Their Personal Idol ===
The Top 8 performed songs of their Personal Idols by giving tribute to their undeniable works. Waqas Vicky, Asad Zaidi and Shamir face the Bottom 3 while Shamir gets eliminated after achieving fewer votes than Ali Asad.

- Guest Mentor: Raheem Shah

Order	Contestant	Song	Personal Idol	Result
1	Zamad Baig	"Sanu Ik pal Chain Na Aave"	Nusrat Fateh Ali Khan	Safe
2	Shamir Aziz Quidwai	"Sayonee"	Ali Azmat	Eliminated
3	Syed Ali Asad Zaidi	"Dil Se Re"	A.R. Rehman	Bottom 3
4	Muhammad Shoaib	"Mein Tenu Samjhavan Ki"	Rahat Fateh Ali Khan	Safe
5	Waqas Ali Vicky	"Katna Nae"	Sajjad Ali	Bottom 3
6	Rose Mary	"Solah Baras Ki"	Lata Mangeshkar	Safe
7	Kashif Ali	"Ya Rabbah"	Kailash Kher	Safe
8	Abd-ul-Rafay Khan	"Hungama Hai Kyon Barpa"	Ghulam Ali	Safe

- Adieu performance by Shameer Aziz Quidwai: "Ab Ye Jana Kyun Ye Rang"

=== Top 7 – National Songs ===
Top 7 performed patriotic songs of country in order to celebrate the یوم پاکستان, a historic resolution of Pakistan, occurred at 23 March 1940. Waqas is eliminated subsequently after facing public votes.

Order	Contestant	Song (original artist)	Result
1	Muhammad Shoaib	"Aye Watan Kay Sajeelay Jawanon" (Noor Jehan)	Bottom 3
2	Kashif Ali	"Chand Meri Zameen Phool Mera Watan" (Amanat Ali Khan)	Safe
3	Rose Mary	"Watan Ki Matti Gawah Rehna" (Nayyara Noor)	Safe
4	Abd-ul-Rafay Khan	"Aye Watan Pyare Watan, Aye Watan Pak Watan" (Amanat Ali Khan)	Bottom 3
5	Syed Ali Asad Zaidi	"Junoon Se Aur Ishq Se" (Junoon)	Safe
6	Zammad Baig	"Pakistan Pakistan, Mera Inam Pakistan" (Nusrat Fateh Ali Khan)	Safe
7	Waqas Ali Vicky	"Ye Watan Tumhara Hai" (Mehdi Hassan)	Eliminated

- Adieu performance by Waqas Ali Vicky: "Yaad Piya Ki Aayi"

=== Top 6 – Judge's Choice ===
Top – 6 performed songs of Judges choices, Band Strings was invited as a guest mentor for the contestants. Rafay is eliminated after getting the fewest votes.

- Guest Mentor: Bilal Maqsood, Faisal Kapadia and Zoe Viccaji

Order	Contestant	Song (original artist)	Result
1	Zammad Baig	"Jiya Dharak Dharak Jaye" (Rahat Fateh Ali Khan)	Bottom 2
2	Kashif Ali	"Mitwa" (Shafqat Amanat Ali)	Safe
3	Muhammad Shoaib	"Akhiyan Nun Rehen Dey" (Reshma)	Safe
4	Syed Ali Asad Zaidi	"Bin Tere" (Shekhar Ravjiani)	Safe
5	Rose Mary	"Dil Hai Chota Sa" (Minmini)	Safe
6	Abd-ul-Rafay Khan	"Maae Ni Main Kinun Aakhan" (Hamid Ali Bela)	Eliminated

- Adieu performance by Abd-ul-Rafay Khan: "Ve Mahiya Tere Vekhan Nu"

=== Top 5 – Ali Zafar ===
All contestants performed Ali Zafar songs as per the selected theme. Rose and Kashif appear in the Bottom 2, after receiving the fewest votes, with Rose eliminated after having the lowest votes.

- Guest Mentor: Ali Zafar

Order	Contestant	Song	Result
1	Rose Mary	"Dichkiyaoon Doom Doom"	Eliminated
2	Syed Ali Asad Zaidi	"Dekha Jo Tere Ankhoon Main"	Safe
3	Kashif Ali	"Jugnoon Se Bhar Lay ANchaal"	Bottom 2
4	Muhammad Shoaib	"Masti Kay Din Hain"	Safe
5	Zamad Baig	"Kehnde Ne Looki"	Safe

- Adieu performance by Rose Mary: " Alvida Yaara Alvida "

=== Top 4 – Qawwali ===
Top 4, presented Qawwali theme, Sajjad Ali and Amjad Sabri were invited as a guest judge. Kashif is eliminated after having lower votes than Ali Asad.

- Guest Mentor: Sajjad Ali and Amjad Sabri

Order	Contestant	Song (Original artist)	Result
1	Kashif Ali	"Ajaa Teno Akhiyaan " (Nusrat Fateh Ali Khan)	Eliminated
2	Syed Ali Asad Zaidi	"Dama Dam Mast Qalandar" (Nusrat Fateh Ali Khan)	Bottom 2
3	Zamad Baig	"Yeh Jo Halka Halka Suroor Hai" (Nusrat Fateh Ali Khan)	Safe
4	Muhammad Shoaib	"Mast Nazaroon Se" (Nusrat Fateh Ali Khan)	Safe

- Adieu performance by Kashif Ali: "Ho Kadi Aaa Mil Sawal Yar We"

=== Top 3 – Bhangra / Classical ===
Top 3 performed on two being set theme challenges, Abrar and the members of Fuzön band Khurram Iqbal Shallum Asher Xavier and Imran Momina were the guest mentors for given challenges.

- Guest Mentor: Abrarul Haq

Order	Contestant	Song (Original artist)	Result
Challenge 1: Bhangra
1	Syed Ali Asad Zaidi	"Nagada Nagada" (Sonu Nigam / Javed Ali)	Eliminated
2	Muhammad Shoaib	"Dardi Rab Rab Kardi" (Daler Mehndi)	Safe
3	Zammad Baig	"Jutt" (Abrar-ul Haq)	Bottom 2
Challenge 2: Classical
1	Muhammad Shoaib	"Madhvanti" (Shafqat Amanat Ali Khan)	Safe
2	Zammad Baig	"Soona Soona" (Rameez Khan)	Bottom 2
3	Ali Asad Zaidi	"Neend Na Aye" (Rameez Khan)	Eliminated

- Adieu performance by Syed Ali Asad Zaidi: "Tum Jo Milgaye Ho"

=== Top 2 – Contestant Choice Medleys & Final Performance ===
Pakistan Idol Pre-Finale's, Top-2 contestants performed, medleys and their own choice final performance. On the basis of public voting, Zamad beat Shoaib and became the first winner of Pakistan Idol season 1.

- Guest Mentor: Sajjad Ali and Tina Sani

Order	Contestant	Song (Original artist)	Result
1	Muhammad Shoaib	"Sun Charkhe Di Mitthi Mitthi Kook" (Nusrat Fateh Ali Khan) "Sawan Mein Lag Gae Aag" (Mika Singh)	Runner-up
2	Zamad Baig	"Tere Ishq Ne Nachaya" (Saeen Akhtar) "Tere Ishq Mein Jo Doob Gaya" (Allan Fakir / Muhammad Ali Shyhaki)	Winner
3	Muhammad Shoaib	"Layi Vi Na Gayee" (Sukhwinder Singh)	Runner-up
4	Zamad Baig	"Allah Hu, Allah Hu" (Nusrat Fateh Ali Khan)	Winner

== Elimination details ==
=== Elimination chart ===
Top 24	Top 13	Wild Card	Winner

Did Not Perform	Safe	Safe First	Safe Last	Bottom 2 ^{3}	Eliminated

Stage:		Semi-finals	Wild Card	Finals											
Month/Week/ Elimination date:		1/1-4/12, 19, 26 0/1-2/0.^{2}		2/3/9	2/4/16	2/5/23	3/6/2	3/7/9	3/8/16	3/9/23	3/10/30 ^{4}	4/11/6	4/12/13	4/13/20	4/14/27
Place	Contestant	Result													
1	Zamad Baig	Top 13				Bottom 3		Bottom 3			Bottom 2			Bottom 2	Winner
2	Muhammad Shoaib	Top 13		Bottom 3						Bottom 3					Runner-up
3	Syed Ali Asad Zaidi	Top 13							Bottom 3				Bottom 2	Eliminated	
4	Kashif Ali	Wild Card	Top 13									Bottom 2	Eliminated		
5	Rose Mary	Top 13					Bottom 3					Eliminated			
6	Abd-ul-Rafay Khan	Top 13								Bottom 3	Eliminated				
7	Waqas Ali Vicky	Top 13			Bottom 3				Bottom 3	Eliminated					
8	Shamir Aziz Quidwai	Top 13					Bottom 3	Bottom 3	Eliminated						
9	Asad Raza Sonu	Top 13						Eliminated							
10	Sana Zulfiqar	Top 13			Bottom 3	Bottom 3	Eliminated								
11	Syed Sajid Abbas	Top 13				Eliminated									
12	Waqas Ali	Top 13		Bottom 3	Eliminated										
13	Mehwish Maqsood	Top 13		Eliminated											
14–20	Waqar Ahsan	Wild Card	Elim												
14–20	Ghazal Ali	Wild Card	Elim												
14–20	Ali Rizwan	Wild Card	Elim												
14–20	Muhammad Zeeshan Ali	Wild Card	Elim												
14–20	Fiza Javed	Wild Card	Elim												
14–20	Midhat Hidayat	Wild Card	Elim												
14–20	Seemab Arshad	Wild Card	Elim												
21–24	Muhammad Yasir Khan	Elim													
21–24	Fayeza Rashid	Elim													
21–24	Abd-ul-Ahad Khan	Elim													
21–24	Umer Aftab	Elim													

^Note 2: First Parameter shows the Passing Month, Second shows Week number and third parameter shows the Elimination date. Hence from the semi-finals to Wild card it took 1 month, and 4 weeks, while 12, 19, 26 shows the elimination dates. In order to understand refer List of Pakistan Idol episodes to see the result dates of each round. While figure 0/1-2/0 shows that between such weeks Wild card show and Top-12 Journey So Far episodes occurs.
^Note 3: As only two contestants will be in the bottom, that's why the Bottom 2 color box is introduced, Safe last and Safe first color boxes are no longer required.
^Note 4: Following Top-6 to winner, the danger zone will be filled with only two contestants as Bottom 2.

=== Bottom 3 and Bottom 2 Count ===
Finals
Weeks		3	4	5	6	7	8	9	10	11	12	13	14	Bottom count
Place	Contestants	Bottom 3 details							Bottom 2 details					Total counts
1	Zamad	Safe	Safe	Bottom 3	Safe	Bottom 3	Safe	Safe	Bottom 2	Safe	Safe	Bottom 2	Winner	4
2	Shoaib	Bottom 3	Safe	Safe	Safe	Safe	Safe	Bottom 3	Safe	Safe	Safe	Safe	Runner-up	2
3	Asad	Safe	Safe	Safe	Safe	Safe	Bottom 3	Safe	Safe	Safe	Bottom 2	Eliminated		3
4	Kashif	Safe	Safe	Safe	Safe	Safe	Safe	Safe	Safe	Bottom 2	Eliminated			2
5	Rose	Safe	Safe	Safe	Bottom 3	safe	Safe	Safe	Safe	Eliminated				2
6	Rafay	Safe	Safe	Safe	Safe	Safe	Safe	Bottom 3	Eliminated					2
7	Waqas Vicky	Safe	Bottom 3	Safe	Safe	Safe	Bottom 3	Eliminated						3
8	Shamir	Safe	Safe	Safe	Bottom 3	Bottom 3	Eliminated							3
9	Asad	Safe	Safe	Safe	Safe	Eliminated								1
10	Sana	Safe	Bottom 3	Bottom 3	Eliminated									3
11	Sajid	Safe	Safe	Eliminated										1
12	Waqas	Bottom 3	Eliminated											2
13	Mehwish	Eliminated												1

- In above bottom three count table, all the contestants danger zone history is provided, in each column third Bottomed 3 represented by a grey header line pointing that particular contestant eliminates periodically.

== Clear Moment of the day ==
With the Race of TOP 10 finalists, series has started shown Clear Moment of the Day performance at the end of show, which represents the best, energetic, and soulful performance by a contestants and well received by Judges.

== Controversies ==
From the inception of show, back in 2007, Pakistan Idol faces many problems and immense negative response by audience which leads to stop the production of franchise, it then took six years to handle all the problems and show finally went on air in late 2013. Owing to the production with linearly, shows became icon of the year, all the perceptions went wrong and series garnered millions views.

=== Voting Trend ===
After the selection of 24 semi-finalist race begins to reach at place of Top 13, and the fate of 24 contestants to winner was put on audience by public voting. With the Top 13, contestants like Mehwish, Waqas and Sajid which had been consistent throughout the show were eliminated after facing public votes, this affects and arise many questions on voting system, Judges were left mournful and doleful with the departure of consistent singers, therefore, production of series overviews the voting system and announce that an individual with one number can give maximum 25 Votes only to contestants, above 25 votes no vote will be counted and also one message cost only Rs. 0.50 Paisa + Tax.

=== Maria Meer Rejection ===
During the auditions, show went through the limelight of controversial happening, when in Faisalabad auditions a young girl Maria Meer was rejected by all three judges on course of the immaturity and lean voice of her. The audition episode went viral and a blog war started against judges. Maria became a sort of social media celebrity after her appearance on the show. Her rejection got too much attention that famous writer, broadcaster and journalist Raza Ali Abidi stated on his social networking site that: "A girl who is treated so badly in trials of show, i wish some channel with good producers must have done a great-show with her. I need your positive response!".

After much controversial act, aspiring singer-songwriter and producer Amanat Ali approaches to Maria Meer family and decided to launch a music video with her. In upcoming album of Amanat Aas, song Naina Lagay featuring Maria and himself was recorded, online release of Song got much acclaim and Amanat receives huge respect and acclaim. Maria was invited and approaches by many media personalities and has already done many interviews and programs.
