= Shabnam Romani =

Pakistani poet (1928–2009)

- Born: 30 December 1928; Budaun, British India
- Died: 17 February 2009 (aged 80)
- Occupations: Urdu poet based in Karachi, Pakistan; publisher and editor of Quarterly Aqdar, a literary Urdu magazine; wrote a regular column in Daily Mashriq Karachi
- Writing career
- Language: Urdu
- Notable works: Jazeera, Doosra Himala, Tohmat

Mirza Azim Baig Chughtai (30 December 1928 – 17 February 2009), known in literary circles by his takhallus (pen name) Shabnam Romani (Urdu: شبنم رومانی), was an Urdu poet based in Karachi, Pakistan. Shabnam Romani wrote several books, including Jazeera, Doosra Himala, and Tohmat. Romani was born in Budaun, British India. He later moved to Pakistan and lived most of his life in Karachi. He was the publisher and editor of the quarterly Aqdar, a literary Urdu magazine. He wrote a regular column in "Daily Mashriq" Karachi.

At the age of 80, Romani died on 17 February 2009, after a long illness. His children include: Faisal Azeem, Saba Shabnam, Saman Shabnam, Kanwal Shabnam, Khurram Azeem, and Sahar Shabnam.

His son Faisal Azeem is a poet based in Canada—his book "Meri Aankhon saay Dekho" was published in 2006.

Shabnam's works

- Masnavi Sair-e-Karachi (1959)
- Jazeera
- Tohmat
- Doosra Himala
- Hyde Park
- Mozay Chilghozay
- Hurf Nissbat
- Hijrat

== See also ==
- Syyed Sajjad Haider Yaldram
- Qurratulain Haider
