= Hira Qaisar =

Pakistani singer and Pakistan Idol winner

- حرا قیصر
- Born: 1999 or 2000 (age 26–27); Faisalabad, Punjab, Pakistan
- Occupation: Singer
- Years active: 2025–present
- Children: 3
- Musical career
- Origin: Faisalabad, Punjab, Pakistan
- Genres: Punjabi folk; popular music
- Instrument: Vocals

Hira Qaisar (Note: Urdu: حرا قیصر; alternatively romanised as Hira Qaiser) (born 1999 or 2000) is a Pakistani singer from Faisalabad, Punjab. She rose to prominence as a contestant on the second season of Pakistan Idol, which she won in August 2026. Hira, who had no formal musical training prior to the competition, received attention for her renditions of Pakistani folk, classical and popular music. As the winner, she received the Pakistan Idol shield and a cash prize of Rs1.5 million.

== Early life and background ==
Hira is from Faisalabad, Punjab, and was 26 years old at the time of her Pakistan Idol victory in August 2026. She grew up in a middle-class family and did not receive formal musical training. Her father, Qaisar Ali, encouraged her interest in music and was the primary influence on her singing. He died approximately eight years before her Pakistan Idol victory.

Hira studied through the eighth grade and married in 2013. She has three children. Before her appearance on Pakistan Idol, she lived with her family in rented accommodation in Faisalabad.

Hira initially faced opposition from members of her family to pursuing singing professionally. In a December 2025 interview with Daily Jang, while she was competing in the Top 16 of Pakistan Idol, she said she had eventually convinced her husband and brother to support her participation in the competition. She later told BBC Urdu that her mother, sisters and husband supported her throughout the competition, with her brother also becoming supportive.

As a mother of three, Hira initially did not intend to audition for Pakistan Idol, citing the difficulty of leaving her children to participate. Her younger sister encouraged her to audition, after which she travelled to Lahore to take part in the auditions and subsequently to Karachi for the competition.

== Career ==
=== 2025–2026: Pakistan Idol ===
Hira auditioned for the second season of Pakistan Idol in Lahore. She subsequently advanced to the theatre round, where she performed "Sajan" by the Mekaal Hasan Band. Her performance earned her the Golden Pearl Golden Mic, advancing her directly to the Top 16.

In the first gala round, Hira performed Noor Jehan's "Jindiye Hun Te Magroon Leh Ja". Writing for The News International, the publication's Instep section highlighted her command of the lower register, rich vocal tone and focus during the performance. Following the round, Hira received the show's Ecostar Rising Star Award.

By December 2025, Hira had reached the Top 16 and was profiled by Daily Jang, which described her as attracting nationwide attention through her participation in the programme. She continued to advance through the gala rounds, performing songs associated with artists including Nusrat Fateh Ali Khan, Noor Jehan, Mekaal Hasan Band and others.

Hira later identified "Jindiye Hun Te Magroon Leh Ja" and her rendition of Nusrat Fateh Ali Khan's "Meri Zindagi Tera Pyar" as performances that brought her significant public attention. She told BBC Urdu that recordings of her performances had also attracted responses from listeners outside Pakistan, including in India.

Hira ultimately advanced to the super finale without having been placed in the bottom group during the televised gala rounds. During the finale, she performed "Zindagi Tamasha Bani", a song originally sung by Pakistani playback singer Afshan for the 1974 Punjabi film Naukar Wohti Da.

On 23 August 2026, Hira was announced as the winner of the second season of Pakistan Idol at the grand finale. She received the winner's shield and Rs1.5 million in prize money. Hira accepted the award while holding her infant son.

The finale featured performances and appearances by Rahat Fateh Ali Khan, Atif Aslam, Bilal Maqsood, Zeb Bangash and Fawad Khan. Following her victory, Hira said that she had entered the competition with the goal of using the prize money towards securing a home for her children.

Her victory was celebrated in her hometown of Faisalabad, where residents gathered to welcome her on her return following the finale.

=== Performances and results ===
Pakistan Idol season 2 performances and results
Stage	Theme	Song choice	Original artist	Result
Audition	N/A	"Sanware Tore Bin Jiya"	Nusrat Fateh Ali Khan	Advanced
Theatre round	N/A	"Sajan"	Mekaal Hasan Band	Golden Mic
Top 16 – Gala 1	Celebration	"Jindiye Hun Te Magroon Leh Ja"	Noor Jehan	Safe
Top 16 – Gala 2	Lyricist Tribute	"Tere Bina Rogi Hoye"	Nusrat Fateh Ali Khan	Safe
Top 15 – Gala 3	Ishq	"Meri Zindagi Tera Pyar"	Nusrat Fateh Ali Khan	Safe
Top 15 – Gala 4	Wedding	"Dhiyan Te Dhan Paraya"	Noor Jehan	Safe
Top 13 – Gala 5	Nostalgia	"Jhok Ranjhan"	Mekaal Hasan Band	Safe
Top 11 – Gala 6	Basant	"Guddi Wangu Sajna"	Afshan	Safe
Top 9 – Gala 7	Mohabbat	"Agar Tum Mil Jao"	Tasawar Khanum	Safe
Top 8 – Gala 8	Culture Night	"Challa" (with Rouhan Abbas)	Inayat Ali	Safe
Top 8 – Gala 9	Independence Day	"Ae Puttar Hattan Tay"	Noor Jehan	Safe
Top 8 – Finale	Finale	"Zindagi Tamasha Bani"	Afshan	Winner

== Artistry ==
Hira did not receive formal musical training before competing on Pakistan Idol, instead crediting her father as the primary source of her musical knowledge. During the competition, she performed across Pakistani folk, classical and popular repertoire, including songs associated with Noor Jehan, Nusrat Fateh Ali Khan, Afshan and the Mekaal Hasan Band.

In Dawn, columnist Zahid Hussain singled Hira out among the season's contestants and praised her ability to perform both classical and popular music despite her lack of formal training. The News International, reviewing her first gala performance, similarly highlighted her lower register, tone and vocal focus.

== Personal life ==
Hira married in 2013 and has three children. She continued caring for her youngest child while participating in Pakistan Idol, and was frequently accompanied by her infant son during the competition. She held him while receiving the winning shield at the season finale.

Hira has said that financial security for her children was a major motivation for entering the competition. Before winning, she and her family lived in rented accommodation in Faisalabad, and she stated that she intended to put her prize money towards obtaining a home for her children.
