= List of Pakistan Idol episodes =

The following is a complete list of episodes for the Geo reality series Pakistan Idol. The series debuted in Pakistan on 6 December 2013. The series entered into Pakistan after the successful adaptations of Idols format based on the British series by the name Pop Idol available in more than 45 nations.

== Season 1: 2014 ==
No.	Title	Original release date	Prod. code
1	"Audition Episode: Lahore (Day 1)"	6 December 2013	1001
Audition held in Lahore and extended for one more day.
2	"Audition Episode: Lahore (Day 2)"	8 December 2013	1002
Audition held in Lahore and that was the last episode of auditions in Lahore.
3	"Audition Episode: Multan"	13 December 2013	1003
Audition held in Multan.
4	"Audition Episode: Faisalabad"	15 December 2013	1004
Audition held in Faisalabad.
5	"Audition Episode: Peshawar and Sukhur"	20 December 2013	1005
Audition held in Peshawar and Sukhur.
6	"Audition Episode: Islamabad"	22 December 2013	1006
Audition held in Islamabad.
7	"Audition Episode: Karachi (Day 1)"	27 December 2013	1007
Audition held in Karachi and extended for one more day.
8	"Audition Episode: Karachi (Day 2)"	29 December 2013	1008
Audition held in Karachi and that was last episode of auditions in Karachi
9	"Theater Round (Day 1)"	3 January 2014	1009
Contestants performed in groups of four or five and the final 35 contestants were selected. The remaining 35 performed in duos or trios where judges eliminated more contestants.
10	"Theater Round (Day 2)"	5 January 2014	1010
The rest of selected contestants gave a solo performance with music tracks. After all the performances, judges selected and revealed The Top 24 semi-finalists. One of the top 24 semi-finalists, Nazish, withdrew from the show due to her father's health issues. Contestant Ghazal Ali was selected to replace Nazish.
11	"Top 24: Group 1"	10 January 2014	1011
After the revelation of Top 24 semi-finalists, all the contestants have to perform on Idol Stage, in order to secure the seat in 13 finalists. From Top 24 to winner all the contestants were selected by audience through online voting process. First Group of 8 contestants: Faiza Javed, Midhat Hidayat, Rose Marie, Waqas Ali Vicky, Waqas Ali, Waqar Ahsan, Abd-ul-Ahad Khan and Syed Sajid Abbas performed.
12	"Top 24: Group 1 Results"	12 January 2014	1012
Rose Marry, Waqas Ali, Syed Sajid Abbas were advanced to top 13 and Faiza Javed, Midhat Hidayat, Waqar Ahsan, Waqas Ali Vicky and Abd-ul-Ahad Khan were eliminated after the results of public votes. Judges selected Waqas Ali Vicky as a fourth finalist by giving a last chance performance between him and Midhat by using power to select any one from each group.
13	"Top 24: Group 2"	17 January 2014	1013
Second Group of eight contestants: Kashif Ali, Mehwish Maqsood, M. Yasir Khan, Muhammad Shoaib, Rizwan Ali, Sana Zulfiqar, Abdul Rafay Khan and Muhammad Zeeshan Ali Performed.
14	"Top 24: Group 2 Results"	19 January 2014	1014
Abdul Rafay Khan, Muhammad Shoaib, Sana Zulfiqar were advanced to top 13 while Mehwish Maqsood, Rizwan Ali, Kashif Ali, M. Yasir Khan and Muhammad Zeeshan were eliminated after facing public votes. Judges Selected Mehwish Maqsood as a fourth finalist between her and Muhammad Zeeshan, by giving them a last chance performance to save any one contestant.
15	"Top 24: Group 3"	24 January 2014	1015
Third Group of 8 contestants: Ghazal Ali, Fayeza Rashid, Zammad Baig, Seemab Arshad, Umar Aftab, Asad Raza, Shamir Aziz Quidwai and Syed Ali Asad Zaidi performed.
16	"Top 24: Group 3 Results"	26 January 2014	1016
Zammad Baig, Asad Raza, Shamir Aziz Quidwai were advanced to top 13 while Ghazal Ali, Fayeza Rasheed, Umar Aftab, Syed Ali Asad Zaidi and Seemab Arshad were eliminated after facing public votes. Judges Selected Syed Ali Asad Zaidi as a fourth finalist between him and Seemab Arshad, by giving them a last chance performance to save any one contestant.
17	"Wild Card Show"	31 January 2014	1017
On the basis of Previous performances of 12 eliminated contestants judges selected Midhat Hidayat, Kashif Ali, Seemab Arshad, Ali Rizwan, Zeeshan Ali, Waqar Ahsan, Fiza Javed and Ghazal Ali for wild card rounds, All contestants performed one by one in order to secure last seat as a 13 finalist.
18	"Top 12 Journey So Far"	2 February 2014	1018
After wild card round, all the selected 12 contestants were interviewed about their journey to the show, and the 13 finalist from the wild card was announced in Gala round.
19	"Top 13 Perform"	7 February 2014	1019
Kashif Ali was among the 13 finalists after achieving public votes. Theme: 60s & 70s hits of Pakistani Music.
20	"Top 13 Results"	9 February 2014	1020
Mehwish Maqsood, Waqas Ali and Muhammad Shoaib face the bottom three danger zone, Shoaib and Waqas join the top 12 by getting higher votes than Mehwish. Eliminated: Mehwish Maqsood
21	"Top 12 Perform"	14 February 2014	1021
After Mehwish elimination, Top 13 turned down to Top 12, all constants perform Love songs on the eve of Valentines Day as per theme set. Theme: Love Songs
22	"Top 12 Results"	16 February 2014	1022
Waqas Ali, Waqas Ali vicky and Sana Zulfiqar were in danger zone as a bottom three, achieving higher votes than Waqas Ali, Sana and Waqas Vicky to join the Top 11 contestants. Eliminated: Waqas Ali
23	"Top 11 Perform"	21 February 2014	1023
All the Top 11 contestants recreate the aura of Pakistani Pop Music, Sajjad Ali was the first guest of the series. Sana Zulfiqar reached studio from hospital and performed in last due to her lean health condition. Theme: Pakistani Pop Music Guest Mentor: Sajjad Ali
24	"Top 11 Results"	23 February 2014	1024
Sana Zulfiqar, Zammad Baig and Sjid Abbas faces bottom three after getting fewer votes than other contestants. Sana and Zammad were saved and joined the Top 10 having higher votes than Sajid. Eliminated: Syed Sajid Abbas
25	"Top 10 Perform"	28 February 2014	1025
'Top 10' race begins after the elimination of Sajid, contestants performs songs of their memories. All the contestants pay tributes to Pepsi as a leading sponsor of Pakistani reality competitions for almost two decades. Theme: Songs of Memories
26	"Top 10 Results"	2 March 2014	1026
Sana Zulfiqar, Shamir Quidwai and Rose Mary comes in bottom three after facing public votes, Shamir was saved first achieving higher votes than Sana and Rose, while Sana is eliminated for having fewer votes than Rose. Eliminated: Sana Zulfiqar
27	"Top 9 Perform"	7 March 2014	1027
Alamgir was invited as a guest judge for the week five, all contestants performed on a theme of Party Music. Theme: Party Music Guest Mentor: Alamgir
28	"Top 9 Results"	9 March 2014	1028
Zamad Baig, Shamir Aziz Quidwai and Asad Raza Sonu face the danger zone, Shamir and Zamad are safe by getting higher votes than Asad, ultimately Asad is eliminated after facing public votes. Eliminated: Asad Raza Sonu
29	"Top 8 Perform"	14 March 2014	1029
All the contestants performed on the theme that was set to tribute their personal singing Idols. Theme: Their Personal Idols Guest Mentor: Raheem Shah
30	"Top 8 Results"	16 March 2014	1030
Shamir Aziz Quidwai is eliminated after achieving fewer votes than Ali Asad Zaidi and Waqas Vicky who appears in Bottom 3. Eliminated: Shameer Aziz Quidwai
31	"Top 7 Perform"	21 March 2014	1031
All the finalists performed patriotic songs on a theme set Pakistan Day – Tribute to Pakistan, Abdul Sattar Edhi was invited as a Guest Mentor, but, due to illness he could not join the show, and requested his national song and gave a good-luck message to contestants and Pakistan through a video message. Theme: National Songs-Pakistan Day
32	"Top 7 Results"	23 March 2014	1032
Waqas Vicky, Rafay and Shoaib faces bottom three, while Shoaib secures his after achieving highest votes among bottom three, Waqas is eliminated securing fewer votes from the public while Rafay joins Top 6 after achieving fewest votes. Eliminated: Waqas Ali Vicky
33	"Top 6 Perform"	28 March 2014	1033
Top 6, performed on a theme set as a Judges Choice, The band Strings alongside Zoe Viccaji appears as a guest mentor, while Zoe presence was only to promote her songs with Strings. Theme: Judge's Choice Guest Mentor(s): Bilal Maqsood, Faisal Kapadia and Zoe Viccaji
34	"Top 6 Results"	30 March 2014	1034
From Top – 6 to winner Danger zone will be considered as a Bottom 2, only two contestants will be put up in danger zone instead of three as bottom three. As a surprise to everyone including Zamad, Mohib Mirza arranged for Zamad's parents to come to Karachi for the results as well inviting Rafay's mother to come once again on the stage for the results. Rafay and Zamad come in the bottom two, having the fewest votes among others. Rafay is eliminated after having fewer votes than Zamad. Eliminated: Abd-ul-Rafay Khan
35	"Top 5 Perform"	4 April 2014	1035
All the contestants performed hit musical numbers of guest mentor Ali Zafar. Theme: Ali Zafar's songs Guest Mentor(s): Ali Zafar
36	"Top 5 Results"	6 April 2014	1036
Rose Marry and Kashif Ali, faces bottom 2, while Rose is eliminated after facing public votes. Eliminated: Rose Mary]
37	"Top 4 Perform"	11 April 2014	1037
Top-4 performed on a theme set as Qawwali, Guest Judge Sajjad Ali, Amad Sabri and Show Judge Hadiqa Also performed with the contestants. Theme: Qawwali Guest Mentor: Sajjad Ali and Amjad Sabri
38	"Top 4 Results"	13 April 2014	1038
Kashif and Asad comes in bottom two, while Kashif faces elimination, having the fewest votes. Eliminated: Kashif Ali
39	"Top 3 Perform"	18 April 2014	1039
Top-3 performed on a themes as Bhangar and Classical. Abrarul Haq was the Guest Judge and Guest Mentor of Challenge Bhangra while Band Fuzon was invited to sing with Top-3 and for assisting in classical music. Theme: Bhangra / Classical Guest Mentor: Abrarul Haq
40	"Top 3 Results"	20 April 2014	1040
Ali Asad is eliminated after facing public votes, while Zamad is in the bottom two. Shoaib and Zamad become the TOP-2 finalist of Series 1, winners of the show will be declared among these two. Eliminated: Syed Ali Asad Zaidi
41	"Top 2 Perform (Pre-Finale)"	25 April 2014	1041
Top-2 Performed medleys created by them of their own choice, and later performed their own choice final performance, Show recalls all the past events from audition to ahead, and audition of Top – 2 Contestants. While special videos were made of Pakistan Idol season 1 Judges of their own styles and gestures. Theme: Contestants Own choice Medleys and Final Performance Guest Mentor: Sajjad Ali and Tina Sani and Abida Parveen
42	"Top 2 Results (Finale)"	27 April 2014	1042
Winner: Zamad Baig; Runner-up: Muhammad Shoaib

== See also ==
- Pakistan Idol (season 1)
- List of Pakistan Idol finalists
