= Syed Sajjad Haider Yaldram =

Indian writer and linguist (1880–1943)

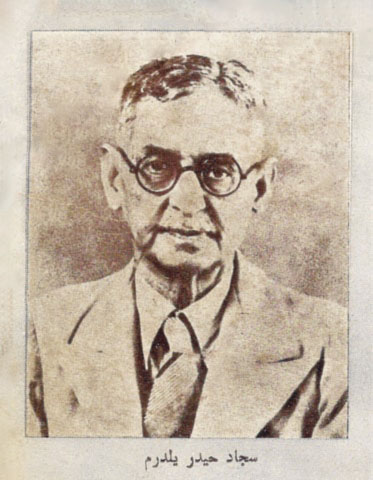
- Syed Sajjad Haider
- Born: Syed Sajjad Haider; 1880; Nehtaur, North-Western Provinces, British India
- Died: 12 April 1943 (aged 62–63); Lucknow, United Provinces, British India
- Education: Aligarh Muslim University
- Occupations: Writer and linguist
- Children: Qurratulain Haider

Syed Sajjad Haider "Yaldram" (1880 – 1943) was an Urdu short story writer, travel writer, translator, linguist, essayist, and humourist from British India.

== Life ==
He was born at Nehtaur village in Bijnor district of the present day Uttar Pradesh state, India. He graduated from Aligarh Muslim University in 1901. He served in government services for 3 years in Baghdad where he learned Turkish language. He also worked in Aligarh University. He traveled to many Muslim countries.

Quratulain Hyder writes that he was sent by the British government to support the Young Turks movement in Turkey against the Ottoman Rule.
