= Aag Ka Darya =

1959 novel by Qurratulain Hyder

Aag Ka Darya (Urdu: آگ کا دریا; River of Fire) is a landmark historical Urdu-language novel written by Qurratulain Hyder providing context to the partition of the Indian subcontinent into two nation-states. It has been described as "one of the Indian Subcontinent's best known novels". The novel timelines spanned more than two thousand years, starting from the time of Chandargupta Maurya in the fourth century BC to the post-Independence period in India and Pakistan. It was published in Urdu in 1959 and translated by the author into English in 1998 as River of Fire. In 2019, it was reprinted by New Directions Publishing.

== Background and plot summary ==
Set across "four Indian epochs (the classical, the medieval, the colonial, and the modern post-national)", Hyder traces the fates of four souls through time: Gautam, Champa, Kamal, and Cyril. "Gautam (appearing first as a student of mysticism at the Forest University of Shravasti in the fourth century B.C.E.) and Champa (throughout embodying the enigmatic experience of Indian women) begin and end the novel; Muslim Kamal appears mid-way through, as the Muslims did, and loses himself in the Indian landscape; and Cyril, the Englishman, appears later still." Their stories crisscross "over different eras, forming and reforming their relationships in romance and war, in possession and dispossession."

== Major themes ==
Together the characters reflect the oneness of human nature amidst the nationalist and religious upheavals of Indian history, Hyder argues for a culture that is inclusive.

Shortly before Partition, Kamal wonders: "The Indo-Muslim life-style is made up of the Persian-Turki-Mughal and regional Rajput Hindu cultures. So, what is this Indianness which the Muslim League has started questioning? Could there be an alternate India? Why?"

"For postcolonial scholars, Hyder's history has long been a purposeful rebuke to the purist Hindutva and Islamist ideologue."

== Style ==
Pankaj Mishra in The New York Review of Books wrote: "(River of Fire) has a magisterial ambition and technical resourcefulness rarely seen before in Urdu fiction. (...) Hyder employs diverse genres – letters, chronicles, parables, journals – to present her melancholy vision of the corrosions of time."

Aamer Hussein described the style thus: "Lyrical and witty, occasionally idiosyncratic, it is always alluring and allusive: Flora Annie Steel and E. M. Forster encounter classical Urdu poets; Eliot and Virginia Woolf meet Faiz Ahmed Faiz".

== Reception ==
Aamer Hussein in The Times Literary Supplement wrote that River of Fire is to Urdu fiction what One Hundred Years of Solitude is to Hispanic literature. In 2009 Wasafiri magazine placed the novel on its list of 25 Most Influential Books published in the previous quarter-century.

In a review for a 2019 reprint by New Directions Publishing, Aditi Sriram wrote in The New York Times that the novel "is as relevant in 2019 as it was when she first wrote it in 1959."

Kamil Ahsan in The Nation wrote:

The magnum opus of possibly the most acclaimed Urdu novelist of all time...River of Fire tells a completist and syncretistic version of 2,500 years of history in modern-day India, Pakistan, and Bangladesh—beginning with the Nanda Dynasty on the brink of defeat by the founder of the Mauryan Empire (323 to 185 BCE), and ending in post-Partition despair. But the novel, barreling through the ages, leads up to 1947 with great purpose, the deep past used to understand the suddenness and chaos of Partition. ... In Hyder's telling, the moral anguish of Partition is pointedly not a culmination of everything from 300 BCE onward. Instead, it can be understood as a lament for the loss of all that history, the history that created identities 'so intermingled that it was impossible to separate the warp and woof of the rich fabric'.

== See also ==
- Artistic depictions of the partition of India
