= Qurratulain Hyder =

Indian Urdu writer (1928-2007)

- Born: 20 January 1927; Aligarh, United Provinces, British India
- Died: 21 August 2007 (aged 80); Noida, Uttar Pradesh, India
- Education: Lucknow University; Indraprastha College
- Occupation: Writer
- Parent(s): Syed Sajjad Haider Yaldram (Father), Nazar Sajjad Haider (Mother)
- Writing career
- Pen name: Aini Apā
- Genres: Novelist & short story writer
- Notable work: Aag Ka Darya (River of Fire) (1959)
- Notable awards: Sahitya Akademi; Jnanpith; Padma Bhusan

Qurratulain Hyder (20 January 1927 – 21 August 2007) was an Indian Urdu novelist and short story writer, academic, and journalist. One of the most outstanding and influential literary names in Urdu literature, she is best known for her magnum opus, Aag Ka Darya (River of Fire), a novel first published in Urdu in 1959, from Lahore, Pakistan, that stretches from the fourth century BC to post partition of India.

Popularly known as "Ainee Apa" among her friends and admirers, she was the daughter of writer and pioneer of Urdu short story writing Syed Sajjad Haider Yaldram (1880–1943). Her mother, Nazar Zahra, who wrote at first as Bint-i-Nazrul Baqar and later as Nazar Sajjad Hyder (1894–1967), was also a novelist and protegee of Muhammadi Begam and her husband Syed Mumtaz Ali, who published her first novel.

She received the 1967 Sahitya Akademi Award in Urdu for Patjhar Ki Awaz (short stories), 1989 Jnanpith Award for Akhire Shab Ke Humsafar, and the highest award of the Sahitya Akademi, India's National Academy of Letters, the Sahitya Akademi Fellowship in 1994. She also received the Padma Bhushan from the Government of India in 2005.

== Biography ==
She was born on 20 January 1927 in Aligarh, Uttar Pradesh (though her family were from Nehtaur, UP). Her father Syed Sajjad Haider Yaldram was also a well known Urdu writer in India of travel and humour literature. She was named after a notable Iranian poet Qurrat-ul-Ain Táhirih (Tahira). Qurratul Ain, translated literally means 'solace of the eyes' and is used as a term of endearment. A trendsetter in Urdu fiction, she began writing at a time when the novel was yet to take deep roots as a serious genre in the poetry-oriented world of Urdu literature. She instilled in it a new sensibility and brought into its fold strands of thought and imagination hitherto unexplored. She is widely regarded as the "Grande Dame" of Urdu literature.

After finishing her education from Indraprastha College, Delhi and Lucknow University, she moved to Pakistan in 1947, then lived in England for some time before finally returning to India in 1960. She lived in Bombay for nearly twenty years before shifting to Noida near New Delhi, where she had been staying till her demise. She never married.

She migrated along with her family members to Pakistan in 1947 at the time of independence "in the wake of burning trains of corpses going into and out of both countries, as Muslims moved to Pakistan and Hindus to India.". In 1959, the release of her novel Aag ka Darya (River of Fire) met with controversy in Pakistan. Soon after publication, she decided to go back to India, where she had since lived. She worked as a journalist to earn her living but regularly kept publishing short stories, literary translations and novels, by now almost thirty in number. She was Managing Editor of the magazine Imprint, Bombay (1964–68), and a member of the editorial staff of the Illustrated Weekly of India (1968–75). Her books have been translated into English and other languages.

Hyder also served as a guest lecturer at the universities of California, Chicago, Wisconsin, and Arizona. She was visiting professor at the Urdu Department at Aligarh Muslim University, where her father had earlier been a registrar. She was also Professor Emeritus, Khan Abdul Ghaffar Khan Chair at Jamia Millia Islamia, New Delhi. In 1979 she was in residency at the University of Iowa's International Writing Program.

== Literary works ==
A prolific writer (she began to write at the young age of 11), her literary works include some 12 novels and novellas and four collections of short stories. Hyder has also done a significant amount of translation of classics. Her own works have been translated into English and other languages.

Aag Ka Dariya (River of Fire), her magnum opus, is a landmark novel that explores the vast sweep of time and history. It tells a story that moves from the fourth century BC to the post-Independence period in India and Pakistan, pausing at the many crucial epochs of history. Aamer Hussein in The Times Literary Supplement wrote that River of Fire is to Urdu fiction what One Hundred Years of Solitude is to Hispanic literature. In a review for a 2019 reprint by New Directions Publishing, Aditi Sriram wrote in the New York Times that the novel "is as relevant in 2019 as it was when she first wrote it in 1959." Kamil Ahsan in The Nation wrote: "River of Fire tells a completist and syncretistic version of 2,500 years of history in modern-day India, Pakistan, and Bangladesh—beginning with the Nanda Dynasty on the brink of defeat by the founder of the Mauryan Empire (323 to 185 BCE), and ending in post-Partition despair.”

Her other published works include: Mere Bhi Sanam Khane, 1949; Safina-e-Gham-e-Dil, 1952; Patjhar ki Awaz (The Voice of Autumn), 1965; Raushni ki Raftar (The Speed of Light), 1982; the short novel Chaye ke Bagh (Tea Plantations), 1965 (one of four novellas including Dilruba, Sita Haran, Agle Janam Mohe Bitiya Na Kijo, exploring gender injustice) ; and the family chronicle Kar-e-Jahan Daraz Hai (The Work of the World Goes On), as well as "Gardish-e-Rang-e-Chaman" ( a voluminous documentary novel on the post-1857 tragedy befalling women of respectable families), "Aakhir-e-Shab kay Hamsafar" (a novel on the Naxalite Movement and Bengal unrest), "Chandni Begum" (a novel on the general social condition of Muslims forty years into Partition).

Her first short story, Bi-Chuhiya (Little Miss Mouse), was published in children's magazine Phool and at the age of nineteen she wrote her first novel " Mayray Bhee Sanam khanay ".

== Reception ==
Aamer Hussein in The Times Literary Supplement wrote that "Qurratulain Hyder is one of India’s most respected literary figures. Many of the techniques which she introduced in the 1950s have been borrowed by later writers whose ambitious reworkings of history have brought Indian literature so much acclaim

== Awards and honours ==
She received the Jnanpith Award in 1989 for her novel Aakhir-e-Shab ke Hamsafar (Travellers Unto the Night). She received the Sahitya Akademi Award, in 1967, Soviet Land Nehru Award, 1969, Ghalib Award, 1985. She won Sahitya Akademi Award for her collection of short stories Patjhar ki Awaz (The Sound of Falling Leaves) in 1967. The Urdu Academy in Delhi conferred upon her the Bahadur Shah Zafar Award in 2000. She was conferred Padma Shri by the Government of India in 1984, and in 2005 she was conferred the Padma Bhushan the third highest civilian honour awarded by the Government of India, for her contribution to Urdu Literature and education.

== Death ==
Qurratulain Hyder died in a Noida hospital, near New Delhi, India on 21 August 2007 after a protracted lung illness. She was buried in the Jamia Millia Islamia cemetery, New Delhi.

Her death has been condoled by the President and Prime Minister of India, and Chief Minister of her home state Uttar Pradesh.

== Works ==
In translation

- Sound of the Falling Leaves. Asia Publishing House, 1996. ISBN 0-948724-44-7.
- A Season of Betrayals: A Short Story and Two Novellas. Oxford University Press, 2000. ISBN 0-19-579417-6.
- River of Fire. Translated by Qurratulain Hyder. New Directions Pub., 2003. ISBN 0-8112-1533-4.
- Fireflies in the Mist. New Directions Publishing, 2010. ISBN 0-8112-1865-1
- The Exiles. tr. by Nadeem Aslam. Hesperus Press, 2010. ISBN 1-84391-854-4.

== See also ==
- List of Indian writers
