= Nehtaur =

Nehtaur (Cotton City)
- City
- Location in Uttar Pradesh, India
- Coordinates: 29.33°N 78.38°E
- Country: India
- State: Uttar Pradesh
- District: Bijnor
- Founder: Munshi abdur rahim
- Elevation: 288 m (945 ft)

Population (2018)
  - Total: 68,500

Languages
  - Official: Hindi
- Time zone: UTC+5:30 (IST)
- PIN: 246733
- Telephone code: 01344
- Vehicle registration: UP-20

Nehtaur is a city, near Bijnor city in Bijnor district in the northern Indian state of Uttar Pradesh. Nehtaur is an ancient and well known town because of its culture and educational backgrounds. Nehtaur Town was established by the Taga Minister family of Ajmer state when they came from Ranthambhor, Rajasthan after it was captured by Qutubuddin Aibak and the place was called Nai-thour, meaning new abode. This is how Nehtaur derived its name.

The population included Muslims of various classes as well as Tyagi Brahmins, chowdhrys, and Jains. Zamindars, cultivators, weavers (Julahas) and block printers (Chhipies) were the main social divisions of its rather insular society.

When India was under British administration only Nehtaur had its own administration called the "Bara Topi Sarkar" 12 prominent and educated personalities belonging to the Syed community who were running their own Government completely independent from the British.

When Sir Syed Ahmad Khan visited Nehtaur and asked the zamindars for their support and donation for Aligarh College, he was impressed by the town and its citizens due to their positive response and called the town as "Danishmand" or wise.

== Geography ==
Nehtaur is located at 29.33°N 78.38°E. It is situated at an altitude of 728 meters above sea level. Operated by Uttar Pradesh State Road Transport Corporation (UPSRTC), Nehtaur Bus Station is a minor bus terminal and connects the town to state highway. Regular buses ply from Nehtaur to Dhampur, Bijnor, Nagina, Nurpur, Haldaur and Afzalpur. Also, the station provides short-distance services to nearby places. The nearest railway station is Dhampur and Haldaur Railway Station and the nearest airport is Indira Gandhi International Airport, New Delhi.

== Demographics ==
As of 2001 India census, Nehtaur had a population of 44,301. Males constitute 52% of the population and females 48%. Nehtaur has an average literacy rate of 80%, higher than the national average of 59.5%: male literacy is 74%, and female literacy is 65%. In Nehtaur, 10% of the population is under 6 years of age.

== Economics ==
Nehtaur is famous for its mango and cotton industries as well as the transport truck business, its rich culture and harmony. It also has the highest selling Bharat Petroleum Corporation Limited petrol pump of the area.
