= Shafaat Ali =

Pakistani impressionist and comedian

- شفاعت علی
- Born: Syed Shafaat Ali; 9 February 1986 (age 40); Peshawar, Khyber Pakhtunkhwa, Pakistan
- Education: Graduation
- Known for: Stand up comedy; Acting; TV Host; Impersonator
- Notable work: Bakhabar Sawera; Har Lamha Purjosh; Romeo Weds Heer; The Donkey King; Parwaaz Hai Junoon
- Spouse: Rebecca Faryal

Syed Shafaat Ali (Urdu: سید شفاعت علی; born 9 February 1986) is a Pakistani TV host, political satirist, and a stand-up comedian who is known for his impressions of Pakistani public figures.

== Biography ==
Ali was born on 9 February in Peshawar and studied engineering.

In 2006, Ali co-hosted the 4 Man Show. In 2011, Ali co-hosted Banana News Network. Ali started his own show Mere Aziz Ham Watno in which he starred as well.

In 2016, videos of Ali went viral in which he impersonated Imran Khan, Bilawal Bhutto Zardari and Shahbaz Sharif and he became an overnight sensation online.

Ali was a part of Geo Entertainment's Ramadan transmission Dil Dil Ramzan.

Ali appeared as Nazar in Geo Entertainment's drama Romeo Weds Heer.

He became part of the ARY News special cricket program Har Lamha Purjosh, where he did parodies of Bilawal Bhutto, Imran Khan, Shehbaz Sharif, Aftab Iqbal, Azizi, and many others.

Shafaat Ali was also in the movie "Parwaaz Hai Junoon", he was shown as a cadet in PAF Academy undergoing flying training.

He also appeared as a voice-over artist Zane in ISPR animated series Team Muhafiz.

He also appeared in Faisal Qureshi's film Money Back Guarantee.

== Television ==
Year	Drama	Character	Additional notes
2018-2019	Romeo Weds Heer	Nazar	GEO TV
2022	Team Muhafiz	Zane	Geo Entertainment
2022	Nehar	Mazhar	Hum TV
