= Raza Ali Abidi =

Pakistani journalist and broadcaster

Raza Ali Abidi رضا علی عابدی
- Born: 30 November 1935 (age 90); Roorkee, Uttarakhand
- Occupations: broadcaster, journalist, author
- Employer(s): BBC Urdu Service (1972 - 1996); Columnist at Jang Group of Newspapers (2013 to present)
- Writing career
- Genres: Travelogues, Fiction and Popular History

Raza Ali Abidi (Urdu: رضا علی عابدی; born 30 November 1935) is a Pakistani journalist and broadcaster best known for his radio documentaries on the Grand Trunk Road in Pakistan (also known as Sher Shah Suri Marg in India) and his travelogue along the banks of the Indus River. His published works include several collections of cultural essays and short stories. He worked with the BBC Urdu Service until his retirement in 1996.

== Early life and career ==
Raza Ali Abidi was born in 1935 in Roorkee, a city in the Saharanpur District of the United Provinces of Agra and Oudh. He moved to Karachi, Pakistan with his family in 1950, three years after the Partition of India which created Pakistan as a homeland for British Indian Muslims. He graduated from Islamia College, Karachi and worked as a relatively unknown journalist for 15 years. Then, he moved to London and worked for the BBC from 1972 to 2008.

"Raza Ali Abidi is a writer of consequence because of his travels. He owes almost all his writings to his travels but he doesn't travel at random." In November 2013, he was awarded an honorary doctorate degree by the Islamia University of Bahawalpur in recognition of his services to the field of broadcasting, journalism and arts.

== Publications ==
=== Travelogues ===
"Abidi long remained associated with the BBC Urdu Service. There seems to have been an understanding between the BBC and South Asia as each time it was the BBC which had a project in store for him. And each time it was a journey in a different manner".

- Jernaili Sadak (Grand Trunk Road) – Sang-e-Meel Publications, Lahore (1986). This book is an account of his travel from Peshawar to Calcutta on the Grand Trunk Road built by emperor Sher Shah Suri (ruling period 1540 - 1545).

This book is about his bus travel on 'The Grand Trunk Road'. A newspaper columnist describes it this way, "The first was bus travel on the Grand Trunk Road, commonly known as Jurnaili Shahrah, from Peshawar to Calcutta, now called Kolkata. After the journey, Abidi headed to London and narrated his adventures to his listeners at the BBC Urdu service."

Later, he took the same journey by various trains.

- Sher Darya, Sang-e-Meel Publications, 1992

A journey from Laddakh to Thatta in Pakistan all along the banks of Indus River also called the Lion River (Sher Darya)

- Jahaazi Bhai, Sang-e-Meel Publications, 1995
- Rail Kahani (based on his month-long train travel from Quetta to Calcutta), Sange-e-Meel Publications, 1997

Raza Ali Abidi, as a BBC producer, traveled from Quetta to Calcutta by all sorts of trains. "Later he produced a radio documentary named 'Rail Kahani'." A radio documentary with 16 episodes.

- Kutub Khana – his travels in search of rare books and libraries
- Tees Saal Baad, Pehla Safar Aur Hamare Kutub Khaane

=== Literary books ===
- Kutub Khana
- Urdu ka Haal
- Apni Awaz (short stories)
- Jaan Saheb (short Stories)
- Hazrat Ali Ki Taqreerein
- Jaanay Pehchaaney
- Malika Victoria aur Munshi Abdul Kareem
- Naghama-gar (All about lyrics and the lyricists)
- Pehla Safar (memoirs of his first Indo-Pak journey in 1982 – published in June 2011 from oxford university press)
- Radio ke Din (personal memoirs – published in 2011 from Sang-e-Meel Publications, Lahore)
- Akhbar Ki Raatain ( being published from Sang-e-Meel Publications, Lahore)
- Kitaben Apne Aaba Ki (All about 19th century Urdu books), 2012

This book was launched in 2012 at the Arts Council of Pakistan, Karachi. "Speaking on how the idea of the book came about, Mr Abidi said in 1975-76, while working for the BBC, he presented a proposal to his bosses that the relatively less known books written by 19th century Indian authors (which could be found in the India Office Library and Records) should be discussed in a programme." BBC officials gave him the green signal and he went ahead with the project.

- Tees Saal Baad (first Indo-Pak journey + Hamare Kutub Khaanay with additions)
- Puraane Thug (A history of the Thugs of the 19th century in British India)

== Awards and recognition. ==
- Tehzeeb Foundation in Pakistan awarded him 'The Literature Award' in 2013
- Aetraf-e-Kamal Shield (Appreciation of Art) by Pakistan Arts Council in 2014
- Honorary Doctorate degree awarded to Raza Ali Abidi by Islamia University, Bahawalpur in 2013
