= Imran Aziz Mian =

Background information
- Born: March 25, 1981 (age 45)
- Occupations: Qawwali Singer; musician; poet; sufi
- Instrument: Harmonium
- Years active: 2001 till present
- Award: Tamgha-i-Imtiaz (2024)

Imran Aziz Mian (born 25 March 1981) is a Pakistani Qawwali singer and musician. He is the son of renowned Pakistani Qawwali singer Aziz Mian. His musical repertoire includes traditional Qawwalis, Sufi poetry and compositions associated with his father.

== Early life ==
Imran Aziz Mian was born into a family associated with the Qawwali tradition. His father, Aziz Mian, was a prominent Pakistani Qawwal known for his distinctive vocal delivery and extended performances.

Imran began learning and performing Qawwali at an early age and accompanied his father during musical performances. Following his father's death in 2000, he continued the family's musical tradition and established his own performing ensemble.

== Career ==
=== Musical career ===
Imran Aziz Mian's performances draw on the traditional Qawwali style associated with his family. His musical presentations combine devotional poetry, vocal improvisation and ensemble singing, accompanied by traditional instruments such as harmonium, tabla and dholak.

His repertoire includes works by classical and contemporary Urdu and Persian poets, as well as compositions associated with Sufi traditional compositions such as Man Kunto Maula, Nabi Nabi Ya Nabi and Tajdar-e-Haram.

Imran Aziz Mian has also performed works associated with his father, including "Mein Sharabi" and "Teri Soorat".

=== International performances ===
In 2016, he was featured in the Pakistan Showcase at the South by Southwest (SXSW) festival in Austin, Texas. The programme, titled Universal Bliss: The Artful Qawwali of Imran Aziz Mian and Company, presented Qawwali as a musical tradition with cultural and spiritual themes.

In 2018, Imran Aziz Mian performed in Warsaw, Poland, as part of the cultural programme Poland–Pakistan: Music Without Borders. The event was organised through collaboration between the Polish Embassy in Islamabad and the Foundation for Arts, Culture and Education. He performed alongside Pakistani and Polish musicians, presenting Sufi and folk music including compositions based on the poetry of Shah Hussain.

== Selected Discography ==
=== Singles & EP ===
- Shah E Konain Ke Jis Shey Pe (2016)
- Mera Zikar Ya Ali Mola (2017)
- Mera Zikr Ya Ali Maula (2020)
- Bolo Bolo Jhoolay Lal - Single (2024)
- Allah Sy Dar Or Toba Toba Kar (2026)

=== Albums ===
- Mela Sajawan Aye (2026)
- Allah Hi Allah Allah (2026)
- Bari Sarkar Bari, Vol. 2 (2005)
- Jane Qalander, Vol. 2 (2009)
- Aaj Rung Hey (2009)
- Tauba, Vol. 1 (2009)

== Awards and Recognition ==
- 2006 - PBC National Excellence Award in the category of Best Qawal.
- 2014 – Rafi Peer Theatre Award
- 2024 - Recipient of the Tamgha-i-Imtiaz in the field of Qawwali by the Government of Pakistan

His name appeared in the official list of Pakistan Civil Awards issued by the Cabinet Division.
