= Baba Mohammad Yahya Khan =

Pakistani Sufi and writer

Baba Mohammad Yahya Khan بابا محمد یحیٰ خان
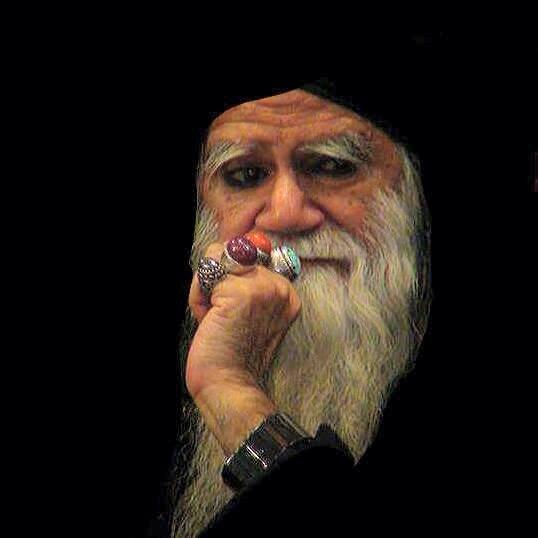
- Born: 7 September 1936; Sialkot, British India
- Occupations: Writer, actor, spiritual teacher
- Writing career
- Language: Urdu, Hindi, Punjabi, English
- Genre: Sufism
- Notable works: Piya Rang Kala, Kajal Kotha, Shab Deedah, Le Baba Ababeel
- Movement: Malaamti
- Website: babayahyakhan.com

Baba Mohammad Yahya Khan (Note: Punjabi: بابا محمد یحیٰ خان, pronounced [ˈbaːbaː mʊˈħammad ˈjaħjaː xaːn]) (Urdu: بابا محمد یحیی خان) is a Pakistani Sufi mystic, writer, traveller, and actor, born on 7 September 1936 in Sialkot, British India. He describes himself as a Durvaish of the Malaamti Order of Spiritualism. He left formal education at an early age, pursuing instead an independent study of classical literature, poetry, and mystical thought.

Khan has performed on PTV, portraying Sufi figures including Bulleh Shah and Mian Muhammad Bakhsh in television plays, and has participated in stage productions in Albania, Azerbaijan, the United Kingdom, Canada, and the United States. His literary works, written primarily in Urdu, address themes of divine love, self-annihilation, and the critique of materialism, and have been translated into several languages.

== Influences ==
Khan has cited associations with a number of prominent figures in Pakistani literary and spiritual life, including Wasif Ali Wasif, Ashfaq Ahmad, Bano Qudsia, and Mumtaz Mufti, among others. He has also been acknowledged by contemporaries including Qudratullah Shahab, Ahmad Nadeem Qasmi, and Amjad Islam Amjad. Further influences cited include Maulana Abdu Salam Niazi Dehlvi, Mahir ul Qadri, Karam Elahi (known as Kanwan Wali Sarkar), and Mir Bashir Palmist.

== Literary works ==
Khan's books draw on Sufi themes and his own experiences as a traveller and spiritual seeker. In a prefatory note to Piya Rang Kala, he wrote that he did not consider himself a formally trained writer, describing whatever he had "seen, known, judged, used, felt and got" as the basis of his work. His books are published by Sang-e-Meel Publications.

- Piya Rang Kala (Urdu: پیا رنگ کالا) – 2001
- Kajal Kotha (Urdu: کاجل کوٹھا) – 2009
- Shab Deedah (Urdu: شب دیدہ) – 2011
- Le Baba Ababeel (Urdu: لے بابا ابابیل) – 2016
- Moom ki Murat (Urdu: موم کی مُورت)
- Mann Mandir Mann Masjid (Urdu: من مندر من مسجد)
