= Shahab Nama =

Urdu autobiography by Qudrat Ullah Shahab

- Front cover
- Author: Qudrat Ullah Shahab
- Original title: شہاب نامہ
- Language: Urdu
- Genres: Autobiography; History
- Set in: 20th century British India and Pakistan
- Publisher: Sang-e-Meel Publications
- Publication date: 1987
- Publication place: Pakistan
- Media type: Print
- Pages: 1248
- OCLC: 59070285

Shahab Nama (Urdu: شہاب نامہ, lit. 'Book of Shahab'; pronounced [ʃə'ɦaːb naːma]) is an Urdu autobiography by renowned Pakistani writer, civil servant and diplomat Qudrat Ullah Shahab. It is an eyewitness account of the background of the subcontinent's Muslims' independence movement and of the demand, establishment and history of Pakistan. The 1,248-page book was published posthumously in 1987, after Shahab's death the previous year. It is his most notable publication and a bestselling Urdu autobiography.

It covers his childhood, education, work life, admission to Imperial Civil Service, thoughts about Pakistan and his religious and spiritual experiences. Mushfiq Khwaja, a close friend of Shahab, was one of those who criticised the book for its exaggerations, inaccuracies and stretched truths. Considering Shahab's reputation as a man of integrity and a Sufi, Dawn wrote that "he mainly told the truth but there were things that he stretched."

== See also ==
- Aangan (novel)
- Bano Qudsia
- Mumtaz Mufti
