= Haasil Ghaat =

2005 novel by Bano Qudsia

- Author: Bano Qudsia
- Original title: حاصل گھاٹ
- Language: Urdu
- Genre: Novel
- Publisher: Sang-e-Meel Publishers, Lahore
- Publication date: 2005
- Publication place: Pakistan
- Media type: Book
- ISBN: 969-35-1496-3
- OCLC: 53360824
- LC Class: MLCSA 2003/01665 (P)

Haasil Ghaat (Urdu: حاصل گھاٹ) is a novel by Bano Qudsia. There is some controversy about whether this book is classified as a novel.

It is mainly a collection of thoughts of an old Pakistani man, Humayun Farid, who is visiting his emigrant daughter, Arjmand, in the United States. Most thoughts occur to him as he sits on the balcony of his daughter's home. The narrative may well be employing the stream-of-consciousness technique.

== See also ==
- Bano Qudsia
- Raja Gidh
- Ashfaq Ahmed
