= Haasil =

Haasil may refer to:

- Haasil (film), a 2003 Indian crime drama film directed by Tigmanshu Dhulia, starring Jimmy Sheirgill, Hrishitaa Bhatt and Irrfan Khan
- Haasil (Pakistani TV series), a 2016 Pakistani drama television series directed by Abdullah Badini
- Haasil (Indian TV series), a 2017 Indian thriller romantic drama series

== See also ==
- Haasil Ghaat, a Pakistan novel
