= Mumtaz Mufti =

Pakistani writer (1905–1995)

Mumtaz Mufti ممتاز مفتی
- Born: 11 September 1905; Batala, Punjab, British India
- Died: 27 October 1995 (aged 90); Islamabad, Pakistan
- Occupation: Writer
- Writing career
- Genre: Fiction writer
- Subjects: Literature, philosophy, psychology, socialism
- Notable works: Ali Pur Ka Aeeli, Alakh Nagri, Labbaik, Un Kahi, Talash, Muftianey
- Notable awards: Sitara-e-Imtiaz, 1986; Munshi Premchand Award, 1989
- Website: www.mumtazmuftee.com

Mumtaz Husain, better known as Mumtaz Mufti (Urdu: ممتاز مفتی; September 11, 1905 – October 27, 1995), was a Pakistani writer.

Initially a religious skeptic influenced by authors like Sigmund Freud, Havelock Ellis, Alfred Adler and Fyodor Dostoevsky, he would eventually come back to Islam through Sufism.

Critic Nasir Abbas Nayyar described his writing style as psychological realist.

== Early life and education ==
Mufti was born Mumtaz Husain in Batala, Punjab in British India. He was the son of Mufti Muhammad Hussain and his first wife Sughra Khanum. He belonged to a Punjabi family that provided religious clerics and jurists (mufti) during the Mughal Empire, but lost their title under the Sikh Empire.

After getting his early education in different cities of Punjab such as Mianwali, Amritsar and Dera Ghazi Khan, he graduated in Philosophy and Economics from the Islamia College, Lahore in 1929, during his college days participating in activities such as singing and acting and also being politicized, having been active in the Khilafat Movement.

== Professional career ==
Before partition, he was employed as a civil servant under British rule, having earlier started his career as a school teacher. He then joined the All India Radio as staff artist but resigned when he got an offer from the Bombay film industry.

Soon after the partition in 1947, he migrated to Pakistan with his family. In Pakistan, he would work as a sub-editor for the Istaqlal magazine before becoming a psychanalyst for the Pakistan Air Force in 1949 and joining Radio Azad Kashmir in 1950, which would influence him to become more religious.

== Writing career ==
Mumtaz Mufti started writing Urdu short stories while working as a schoolteacher before 1947.

His first writing was an essay on psychology titled Uljhao while his first published fiction was titled Jhuki Jhuki Ankhen, released in 1932 in Adbi Duniya, a famous literary magazine at the time.

At the beginning of his literary career, he was considered, by other literary critics, a non-conformist writer having liberal views, who appeared influenced by the psychologist Freud. Pakistan's famous writer Ashfaq Ahmed was one of his close friends. According to Ashfaq Ahmed, Mufti used to read unpopular literature by a Swedish writer before 1947. Mufti initially did not like the 1947 partition plan of British India, but changed his views later to become a patriotic Pakistani. In his later life, he used to defend Islam and its principles.

His transformation from liberalism to Sufism was due to his inspiration from a fellow writer Qudrat Ullah Shahab. Despite all the changes in his viewpoints, he did manage to retain his individual point of view and wrote on subjects which were frowned upon by the conservative elements in the society.

The two phases of his life are witnessed by his autobiographies, Ali Pur Ka Aeeli (1961) and Alakh Nagri. According to forewords mentioned in his later autobiography, Ali Pur Ka Aeeli: علی پور کا ایلی is an account of a lover who challenged the social taboos of his times, and Alakh Nagri is an account of a devotee who is greatly influenced by the mysticism of Qudrat Ullah Shahab.

The book Talaash ("Quest") was the last book written by Mumtaz Mufti. It reportedly highlights the true spirit of Quranic teachings.

== Awards and recognition ==
- 1986: Sitara-e-Imtiaz (Star of Excellence) Award by the President of Pakistan
- 1989: Munshi Premchand Award (a literary award from India)

== Legacy ==
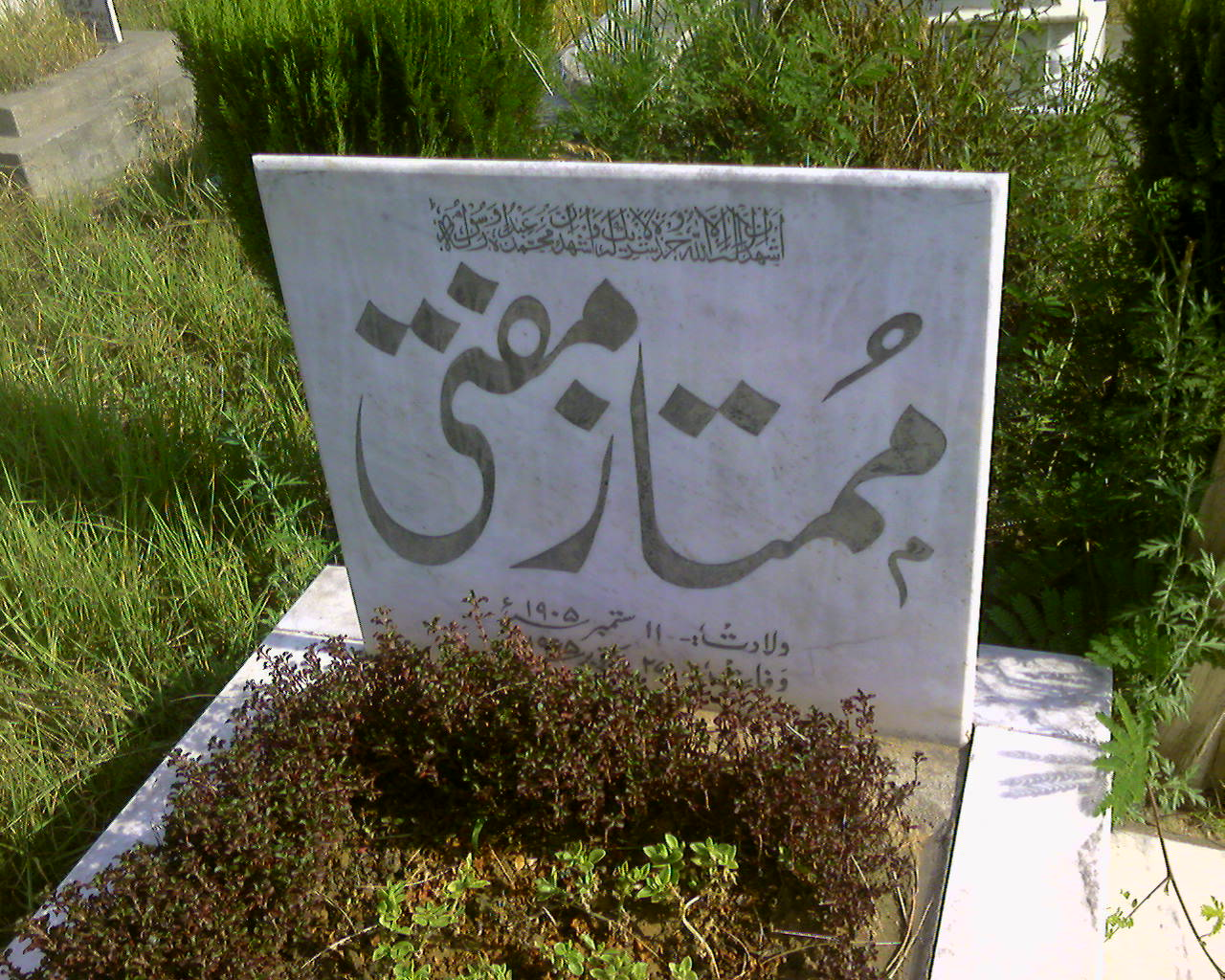
Mufti's grave at H-8 graveyard Islamabad

His son, Uxi Mufti, a literary critic himself, created a Mumtaz Mufti Trust after his death in October 1995. This trust has been observing Mumtaz Mufti's death anniversary events in different cities of Pakistan. His friends and admirers, including Ashfaq Ahmed, Bano Qudsia and Ahmad Bashir have appeared as speakers at these events. Another famous writer Kishwar Naheed comments in one of her book review that Mumtaz Mufti had plenty of human weaknesses but also appreciated him as a learned critic. There is a road named after him in the city of Multan, Pakistan.

== Books ==
=== Short stories ===
- Gehma Gehmi, 1949, 256 p.
- Asmarain, 1952, 327 p.
- Ghubare, 1954, 220 p.
- Ghurya Ghar, 1965, 312 p.
- Raughani Putle, 1984, 244 p.
- Muftiyane, 1989, 1526 p. (collected short stories)
- Kahi Na Jae, 1992, 178 p.
- Chup, 1993, 269 p.
- Samai Ka Bandhan, 1993, 192 p.
- Talash, 1996, 278 p. (last book, the theme being Islam)

=== Play ===
- Nizam Saqqah, 1953, 169 p.

=== Autobiographical novels ===
- Alipur Ka Eli, 1961, 1188 p. (first part of the autobiography)
- Alakh Nagri, 1992, 996 p. (second part of the autobiography)

=== Travelogues ===
- Hind Yatra, 1982, 359 p. (travel to India)
- Labbaik, 1993, 320 p. (account of a Hajj pilgrimage undertaken in 1968)

=== Essays ===
- Piyaz Ke Chilke, 1968, 184 p. (literary criticism and views on Pakistani nationalism)
- Aukhe Log, 1986, 311 p. (impressions of famous Pakistani writers)
- Aukhe Avalre, 1995, 258 p. (biographical sketches of famed Pakistani authors)
