= Qudrat Ullah Shahab =

Pakistani writer and diplomat

Qudratullah Shahab قدرت الله شہاب
- Born: 26 February 1917; Gilgit, British India (now in Pakistan)
- Died: 24 July 1986 (aged 69); Islamabad, Pakistan
- Resting place: Grave No 68 plot No 25 near Gate No 2 H-8 Graveyard, Islamabad
- Occupations: Writer; Civil servant Diplomat
- Spouse: Iffat Shahab (died in Canterbury on 17 June 1974, aged: 42)
- Parent: Abdullah Sahib (father)
- Writing career
- Notable work: Shahab Nama

Qudrat Ullah Shahab (or Qudratullah Shahab, Urdu: قدرت ﷲ شہاب; 26 February 1917 – 24 July 1986) was an eminent Urdu writer, civil servant and diplomat from Pakistan.

Shahab holds the distinction of having served as the Principal Secretary to three heads of state; Governor General Ghulam Muhammad, President Iskander Mirza, and President Ayub Khan. He went on to serve as the Ambassador of Pakistan to the Netherlands in 1962 and later as Information Secretary of Pakistan and Education Secretary of Pakistan.

== Early life and education ==
Shahab was born in Gilgit on 26 February 1917. His father, Abdullah Sahib, belonged to the Punjabi Arain tribe of Chamkaur Sahib village, district Ambala, and was a student at Muhammadan Anglo-Oriental College and a protégé under the supervision of Sir Syed Ahmed Khan. Abdullah Sahib later migrated from Aligarh and settled in Gilgit.

Shahab first rose to prominence when, at 16, an essay he penned was selected for the first prize in an international competition organized by the Reader's Digest, London, and, in 1941, for being the first Muslim from Jammu and Kashmir qualifying for the Indian Civil Service.

During the Bengal famine of 1943, he volunteered to help the local community while he was serving as magistrate at Nandigram, but was criticized by the authorities because he shared the strategic food reserves with the starving locals.

== Career ==
=== Civil services ===
Shahab moved to Karachi, Pakistan, following the 1947 partition and took charge as Under-Secretary (Import and Export), Ministry of Trade, of the newly-formed independent state. He also served as the first Secretary General (later the position was renamed as Chief Secretary) of the Azad Jammu and Kashmir government. He was deputy commissioner of Jhang as well. He served as Secretary to three heads of state. Later, he served as Ambassador of Pakistan to Netherlands and Education Secretary Of Pakistan before resigning from the services during the Yahya Khan period. He was behind many government schemes launched for the benefit of writers and intellectuals.

=== Literature ===
Shahab himself published in English and Urdu languages for contemporary newspapers and magazines of Pakistan Writers' Guild, founded at Karachi in January 1959.

Shahab's essay Maaji poetically outlines the simplicity of his mother and the relationship that his parents shared, detailing migration, governorship, family dynamics, and death in a short chapter.

He is best known for his autobiography Shahab Nama.

=== Spirituality ===
The real disclosure came in the final chapter of Shahab Nama that alluded to an out-of-world personality whom he used to call Ninety as his spiritual guide. After Shahab Nama published, which was actually after Shahab's death, Mumtaz Mufti wrote his autobiography, Alakh Nagri, and openly discussed the hidden traits of Shahab's life. Mufti wrote in the foreword of the book:

Since Shahab has opened his own secrets in the last chapter of Shahab Nama, I find no reason not to share experiences which I witnessed about the mysticism of Shahab

— English translation of the original text in Urdu

== Death and legacy ==
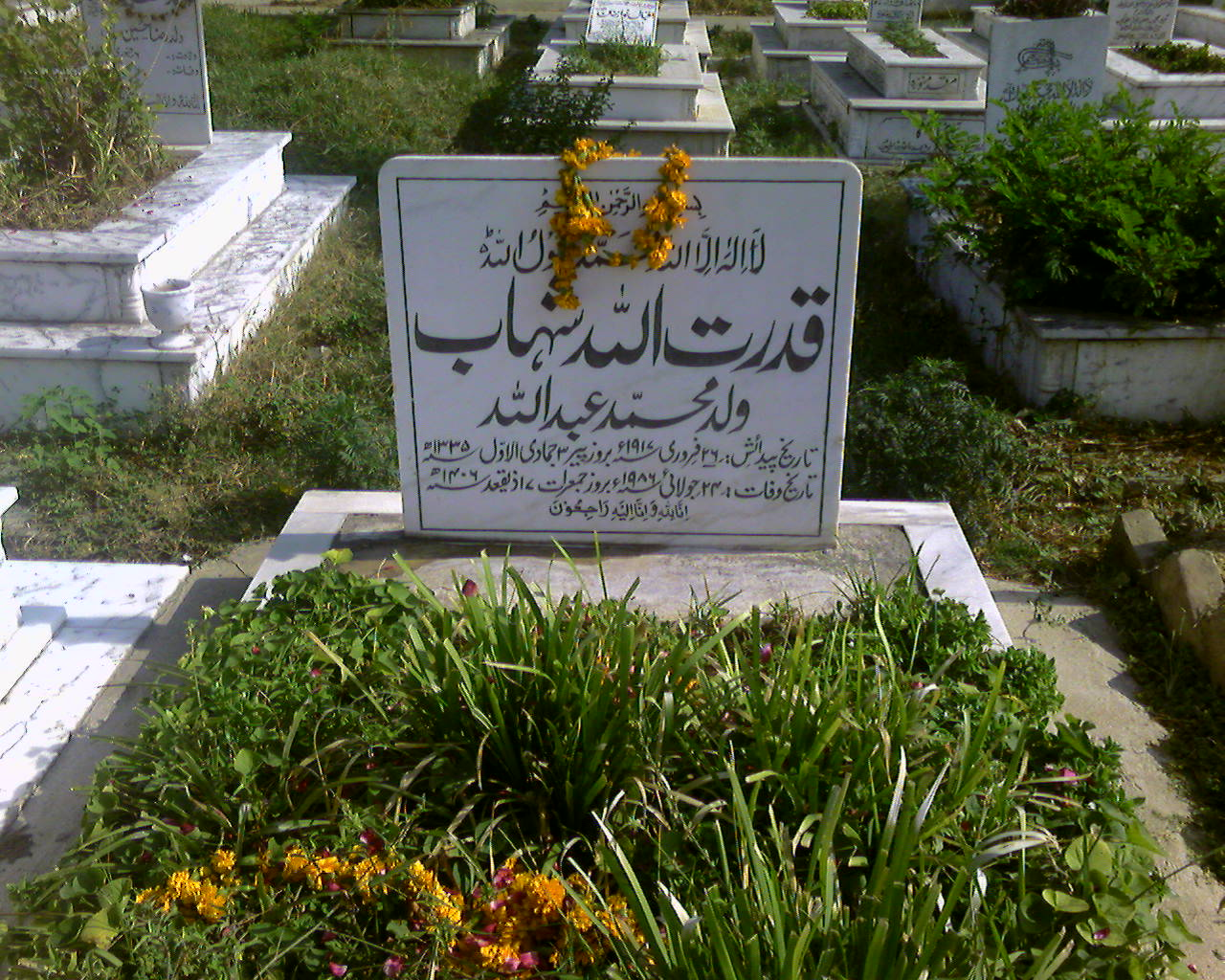
Resting place of Shahab at H-8 Graveyard, Islamabad

Shahab died on 24 July 1986 in Islamabad and is buried in H-8 Graveyard, Islamabad, Pakistan.

Mumtaz Mufti made him the subject of his autobiography Alakh Nagri and later dedicated another book Labbaik. Bano Qudsia, a veteran Urdu writer, wrote a book Mard-e-Abresham on Shahab's personality. A collection of essays about Qudrutullah Shahab has been compiled in a book, Zikr-e-Shahab.

On 23 March 2013, Pakistan Post issued a stamp with denomination of Rs. 15 under the Men of Letters series in the honour of Qudratullah Shahab.

== Books ==
- Shahab Nama شہاب نامہ – autobiography (1986)
- Ya Khuda,یا خُدا – novel
- Mān̲ Jī, ماں جی – short stories
- Surk̲h̲ Fītāh, سُرخ فِیتہ – short stories
- Nafsāne, نفسانے – short stories
- Shahāb Nagar, شہاب نگر – literary miscellany
- Pathans – an essay about Pashtuns
