= Khalid Iqbal Yasir =

Khalid Iqbal Yasir خالد اقبال یاسر
- Born: Khalid Iqbal Yasir; 13 March 1952 (age 74); Sargodha, Sargodha Division, Punjab, Pakistan
- Education: M.A. in History (University of the Punjab, 1978); MSc. Pakistan Studies(Quaid-i-Azam University, 1980); M.Phil in Iqbal Studies(Allama Iqbal Open University, 1992); PhD in Iqbaliyat (Islamia University, Bahawalpur), PhD in Urdu(Islamia University, Bahawalpur, 2011)
- Occupations: Urdu poet, journalist, writer, critic
- Writing career
- Notable awards: Tamgha-e-Imtiaz (2010), National Book Council Manuscript Award (1993), National Book Council Manuscript Award (1990)

Khalid Iqbal Yasir (Urdu: خالد اقبال یاسر) born on 13 March 1952, is an author, scholar, poet, and journalist from Pakistan. He has written several books on history, general knowledge, critics and poetry. He has worked as advisor (Pakistan Studies) at Punjab Public Service Commission, as a consultant for the UNDP and visiting professor at AIOU, Islamabad.

== Early life ==
Khalid Iqbal Yasir was born in the historical town of Bhera in the Sargodha District, Pakistan. Dulla Bhatti, a legendary character of Punjabi epics and folklore was his forefather. He has been described and compared with Robin Hood of 16th-century Mughal Punjab by the British historians. After his schooling at Sargodha, Yasir earned his master's degrees in History and Pakistan Studies from University of the Punjab, Lahore and Quaid-e-Azam University respectively. Later on, he did his M. Phil in Urdu and Iqbal Studies from Allama Iqbal Open University, Islamabad and PhD in Urdu and Iqbaliyat from Islamia University, Bahawalpur.

== Literary career ==
Yasir brought out a handwritten literary journal "Sange-Meel (Urdu: سنگ میل)" (Mile Stone) in his early days as an upcoming writer. Afterwards, he edited two magazines "Ehtasab (Urdu: احتساب)" (Accountability) and "Irtikaz (Urdu: ارتکاز)" (Focus) as student editor for his educational institutions. After doing a number of odd jobs, he joined Pakistan Academy of Letters, Islamabad in 1981 as Deputy Director/Editor. He conceived and edited quarterly "Adabiyat (Urdu: ادبیات)" (Letters) for thirteen years. He also started first-ever literary newsletter "Academy (Urdu: اکیڈمی)" in Urdu and edited it for more than six years for the Academy. He used to compile and edit another educational magazine entitled "Urdu Science Magazine (Urdu: اردو سائنس میگزین)" during his eight years stay at Urdu Science Board as its Director General from 2001 to 2009. Over there, he developed and published more than 350 books in Urdu language in various disciplines of social sciences, basic sciences, technologies and trades besides booklets for literates and neo-literates. In between 2009 and 2012 he had many stints as the Director General of Pakistan Academy of Letters, National Educational Equipment Center, National Museum of Science and Technology, Lahore. He finally superannuated as the Director General, Urdu Science Board, Lahore in March 2012.

== Bibliography ==
=== Poetry ===
- Darobast : (1990) (Urdu: دَر و بست)
- Gardish :(2000) (Urdu: گردش)
- Rukhsati :(2005) (Urdu: رخصتی)
- Mizaj:(2012) (Urdu: مزاج)

=== Research and Criticism ===
- Ahwal-o-Aasaar:(1993) (Urdu: احوال و اسرار)
- Iqbal and Contemporary Literary Movements:(1994)
- 103 Years of Nobel Prize-Chemistry:(2004)
- 103 Years of Nobel Prize-Literature:(2004)
- 103 Years of Nobel Prize-Medicine:(2004)
- 103 Years of Nobel Prize-Peace:(2004)
- 103 Years of Nobel Prize-Physics:(2004)
- 103 Years of Nobel Prize-Economics:(2006)
- Modern Literary Movements and Iqbal:(2014)

=== Translation ===
- Andaz (Patterns)/Federico Mayor:(1995) (Urdu: انداز)
- Muhabbat Roshan Rehti Hay/Abai Kunan Baeav:(1995) (Urdu: محبت روشن رہتی ہے)
- Delphi Ka Rathban (Charioteer in Delphi)/Peter Curman:(2000) (Urdu: ڈلفی کا رتھ بان)
- Poland kee Ishqia Shairee (Treasury of Polish Love):(2001) (Urdu: پولینڈ کی عشقیہ شاعری)
- Kemiadan (The Al-Chemist)/Paulo Coelho:(2001) (Urdu: کیمیادان)

=== Other books ===
- History Canada: Past and Present:(2006)
- Reference Illustrated Urdu Science Encyclopedia (10 Volumes):(2007)
- Kashhaf-Mukhaffat (Deciperment of Abbreviations):(2008)

== Awards ==
- Tamgha-i-Imtiaz (2010)
- National Book Council Manuscript Award (1993)
- National Book Council Manuscript Award (1990)
