= Maulana Abdu Salam Niazi Dehlvi =

Indian Sufi scholar (died 1966)

Maulana Abdu Salam Niazi Dehlvi (Urdu مولانا عبدالسلام نیازی دہلوی ) was a Sufi, Scholar of Delhi, India, Turkman Gate Darwaza near Kali Masjid. He was Scholar of Arabic Persian and other languages. He by profession was Ittar preparing fragrance of different kinds. Abul A'la Maududi learned Arabic from him, Aziz Mian Qawaal, Baba Mohammad Yahya Khan, Josh Malihabadi and lots of others influenced by him. He died on 30 June 1966 in Delhi, India. His books collections are now in Jamia Hamdard, Delhi India.

== See also ==
- Aziz Mian
