= Jalali, Uttar Pradesh =

Jalali, India Jalali
- town
- Location in Uttar Pradesh, India Jalali, India (India)
- Coordinates: 27.87°N 78.27°E
- Country: India
- State: Uttar Pradesh
- District: Aligarh
- Elevation: 178 m (584 ft)

Population (2011)
  - Total: 20,238

Language
  - Official: Hindi
  - Additional official: Urdu
- Time zone: UTC+5:30 (IST)
- Vehicle registration: UP
- Website: up.gov.in

Jalali is a town and a nagar panchayat in Aligarh district in the Indian state of Uttar Pradesh.

== Geography ==
Jalali is t 27.87°N 78.27°E. It has an average elevation of 178 metres (583 feet).

== History ==
Jama Masjid Sadaat in Jalali

Jalali is an ancient and historical town in the district of Aligarh and is known for its rich culture and traditions. Formerly known as Nilavati, Jalali was founded by Jalaluddin Khilji during the reign of Ghiyas ud-din Balban.

One of the oldest inhabited sites in the district of Aligarh, Jalali has been a perfect example of communal harmony for decades. Jalali has been under the influence of Mughals and Britishers.

Its history can be traced back to the 16th century (1550-1560) when Syeds migrated from Srinagar, Kashmir and settled down here. Its believed the great-great-grandson of Sayyid Ali Hamadani (R.A) "Shah-e Hamadan, Sayyid Kamaluddin Hamadani was nominated as Qazi of Jalali by Mughal Emperor Humayun and facilitated to migrate and settle down in Jalali. Sayyid Kamal Uddin Hamadani arrived in Jalali on Wednesday, 10 Oct 1556 CE. At that time, Jalali was the capital of the Koil Region. Sayyid Kamaluddin Hamadani had four sons (1) Sayyid Ameer, (2) Sayyid Makhdoom, (3), Sayyid Ata'allah, and (4) Sayyid Jaan. There are currently four Mohallah's. The first being named after his grandson Abulfadhl ibn Makhdoom, the second being named by a nickname of Ata'allah. The third and fourth beeing named after Ameer and Jaan. They are descendants of Shah-e-Hamdan Ameer Kabir Sayyed Ali Hamdani, a great Islamic Scholar and well-known Sufi saint. Syeds of Jalali were well educated and acquired good positions in Civil Services, Engineering, Education and Army. They owned the majority of agricultural and residential lands in and around Jalali.

Imam Ali ibn Abi Talib (AS)

امام علی ابن ابی طالبؑ

↓

Imam Husayn ibn Ali (AS)

امام حسین ابن علیؑ

↓

Imam Ali Zayn al-Abidin (AS)

امام علی زین العابدینؑ

↓

Husayn al-Asghar

حسین الاصغر

↓

Ubaydullah al-A‘raj

عبید اللہ الاعرج

↓

Ja‘far al-Hujjah

جعفر الحجۃ

↓

Abu Abdullah Husayn

ابو عبداللہ حسین

↓

Abu Muhammad Hasan al-A‘la Mir

ابو محمد حسن الاعلیٰ میر

↓

Abu al-Qasim Mir Syed Ali

ابو القاسم میر سید علی

↓

Mir Syed Muhammad Awwal

میر سید محمد اول

↓

Mir Syed Abdullah Balaghi

میر سید عبداللہ بلاغی

↓

Mir Syed Ja‘far Balaghi

میر سید جعفر بلاغی

↓

Syed Muhammad al-Thani

سید محمد ثانی

↓

Syed Mohibullah Balaghi

سید محب اللہ بلاغی

↓

Syed Muhammad Sharaf ad-Din

سید محمد شرف الدین

↓

Mir Syed Yusuf

میر سید یوسف

↓

Syed Ali al-Akbar

سید علی الاکبر

↓

Syed Muhammad Baqir Hamdani

سید محمد باقر ہمدانی

↓

Mir Syed Shihab ad-Din

میر سید شہاب الدین

↓

Qutb al-Aqtab Mir Syed Ali Hamdani

قطب الاقطاب میر سید علی ہمدانی

(Shah Hamadan / شاہ ہمدان)

↓

Mir Syed Muhammad Hamdani

میر سید محمد ہمدانی

↓

Syed Abu Ali Amr Hamdani

سید ابو علی عمرو ہمدانی

↓

Syed Ahmad Hamdani

سید احمد ہمدانی

↓

Syed Kamal al-Din Husayn Hamdani

سید کمال الدین حسین ہمدانی

│

├── Syed Ameer

│ سید امیر

│

├── Syed Makhdoom Hamdani

│ سید مخدوم ہمدانی

│ │

│ ├── Syed Abul Fadhl

│ │ سید ابو الفضل

│ │

│ └── Syed Mubarak Hamdani

│ سید مبارک ہمدانی

│ ↓

│ Syed Muhammad Muazzim

│ سید محمد معظم

│

├── Syed Jana

│ سید جانا

│

└── Syed Ata'Allah

سید عطا اللہ

- Constructed from Kitab Ul Mushajjar Min Awlad Hussain Al Asghar by Syed Qamar Abbas, this book continues onto the descendants of Hussain Asghar to recent generations.

Jalali has good examples of old Mughal architecture. Though Syed was the most influential and powerful community in Jalali, they maintained religious and social harmony with other residents, benefiting from their education and rich culture.

Jalali has been an active contributor to the development of the Urdu language. It produced a poet of international fame: Ustad Qamar Jalalvi. Some other well-known poets of Urdu who emerged from Jalali are Mohabbat Jalalvi, Peer Mohammad Gauhar Jalalvi, S. Shabber Husain Saher Jalalvi, S. Sajjad Hussain Hadaf Jalalvi, S. Ali Baqar Chacha Jalalvi (known for his humorous poems) and Syed Afsar Ali Baqa Jalalvi. Baqa Jalalvi, one of the greatest poets, composed some marsiyas, nauhas and salams. His a well-known marsiya is "Uffaqe Shaam se utthi jo ghata zulmat ki". His father, Sayyed Zille Hussain Fiza, composed a well-known marsiya, "Andaleebe gule gulzaar risalat hun mein". Sayyid Zille Hussain "Fiza" also edited the famous salam composed by Haidry: "Hai salaam us per jo baikas be padar be yaar tha" which is recited in Jalali on 08 Moharram.Another Marsiya composed by Syed Zille Hussain was "Hinda ne Jab ke Khwab Sunaya Yazeed ko".

== Imambargahs and mosques ==
Jalali has many imambargahs and mosques. One of the finest imambargahs in Jalali is the Imambargah of S. Farzand Ali, which is over 200 years old. It is an imposing structure with a mosque inside. It can accommodate more than 5,000 persons at a time. In addition, women and children gather on the terrace of the imambargah and the mosque in large numbers on 9th of Muharram and on the occasion of Chehlum. Another famous Imambargah of Jalali is in mohalla 'Garhi', called Bara Imambara where a huge Alam of about 30 metres is hoisted on the morning of Ashura. The Ashura procession of Alam, Taazia, Taabut and Zuljinah ends here.

A Persian inscription on Jama Masjid, Jalali

An important landmark in Jalali is the historic Jama Masjid that is taken care by Sayyids of Jalali. It was built by Sultan Ghiyasuddin Balban and is over 700 years old. The masjid bears an inscription with the name of Balban dated 665 Hijri or 1267 AD. The mosque is well maintained and is looked after by a trustee appointed by Shia Waqf Board, Lucknow. The photograph of the mosque and its brief history along with the inscriptions of Sultan Balban, Mohammad Shah and Jalaluddin Akbar was published in the Archaeological Survey of India, 1936. The mosque was renovated and rebuilt by Haji Syed Mehdi Ali of Jalali in 1901. The original mosque had one dome. Two more domes were built by Haji Mehdi Ali who also added a golden kalas on top of each. An account of the contributions of Haji Mehdi Ali is engraved in Persian on the marble stone which forms part of the middle arch of the mosque. In 1826, the arch in the middle of the mosque near mimbar was built by Syed Ahmed Hussain. An engraved stone just above the arch gives complete details.

A shia procession during 19th Chehlum

== Agriculture ==
Jalali is famous for its fertile agricultural lands. The name of Jalali was mentioned by Ibn Battuta in one of his famous travelogues, Rihla. It is also known by the name of S. Mohammad Husain Qamar Jalalvi, who paid a tribute to Jalali in one of his couplets:

"Her sans ghaneemat hey mera ahl-e-watan ko / Duniya mein Jalali Ki hawa bandh raha hun". (All India Mushaira at Aligarh in 1954)
