= Urdu Science Board =

Pakistani academic and literary institution

- اردو سائنس بورڈ
- Abbreviation: USB
- Formation: 1962 May 24; 64 years ago
- Founder: Government of Pakistan
- Type: Government institution
- Purpose: Publication of scientific and technical literature in Urdu
- Headquarters: Lahore, Pakistan
- Official language: Urdu
- Director: Ziaullah Khan Toru
- Parent organization: National Heritage and Culture Division

Urdu Science Board (abbreviated as USB) is an academic and literary institution in Pakistan that operates under the National Heritage and Culture Division, Government of Pakistan. It aims to promote scientific and technical knowledge in Urdu language through the publication of books and journals.

== History ==
The Urdu Science Board was initially established as the Central Urdu Board on 24 May 1962, based on the recommendations of the Sharif Commission (1959). The institution was renamed Urdu Science Board in 1982 to reflect its focus on publishing science and social sciences content in Urdu.

Its former director generals include Ashfaq Ahmed, Amjad Islam Amjad, Khalid Iqbal Yasir, and Nasir Abbas Nayyar.

Former directors include Ikram Chughtai and Abdul Ghafur Rashid, while the current director is Ziaullah Khan Toru.

== Objectives ==
The key objectives of the Urdu Science Board include:

- Publishing science and technical books in Urdu to promote the use of Urdu in education.
- Expanding the Urdu language by developing terminologies for scientific and technical subjects.
- Supporting national development by providing accessible scientific knowledge in the national language.

== Publications ==
The board has published over 700 books on various topics, including science, social sciences, history, children’s literature, and technical education. Notable publications include:

- Urdu Science Encyclopedia
- Dictionaries and glossaries for scientific and technical terms.

The board has been regularly publishing a quarterly magazine titled Urdu Science Magazine since 2002.

== Initiatives ==
The board has undertaken several initiatives:

- Launched the Urdu Science Kitab Ghar, a display center for publications.
- Initiated mobile bookshops to promote books in educational institutions and remote areas.
- Introduced the Urdu Science Award, an annual recognition for outstanding scientific manuscripts.

== Challenges ==
The board has faced financial constraints, resulting in some books being out of print. Despite these challenges, it remains committed to promoting scientific knowledge in Urdu.

== Significance ==
The Urdu Science Board has played a vital role in making science accessible to the general public and promoting the Urdu language in academia and technical fields.
