= Aziz Mian =

Pakistani qawwali singer (1942 - 2000)

"Shahenshah-e-Qawwali" Aziz Mian Qawwal Pride of Performance

Background information
- Also known as: King of Qawwali; The Nietzschean Qawwal
- Born: Aziz Mian; 27 July 1942; Meerut, Uttar Pradesh, British India
- Died: 6 December 2000 (aged 58) Qom, Iran - (buried in Multan, Pakistan)
- Genres: Qawwali, Ghazal
- Occupations: Singer-songwriter; musician; poet; sufi
- Instrument: Harmonium
- Years active: 1966 – 2000
- Labels: EMI Pakistan, Oriental Star Agencies, Columbia Records

Aziz Mian Qawwal (Urdu: عزیز میاں قوال) (b. 27 July 1942 – d. 6 December 2000) was a Pakistani traditional qawwal famous for singing ghazals in his own style of qawwali and is considered one of the greatest qawwals in South Asia.

He holds the record for singing the longest commercially released qawwali, Hashr Ke Roz Yeh Poochhunga, which runs slightly over 115 minutes. Aziz is known by the sobriquets "Shahenshah-e-Qawwali" (Emperor of Qawwali), "Fauji Qawwal"(Military Qawwal), since his early performances were often in army barracks, and "the Nietzschean Qawwal".

"Aziz Mian would purposely work up the audience towards a state in which many in the crowd ended up losing all sense of order and control. He would often explain this as being a state of mind from which the brawling men could be hurled into the next state, a state from which they could leap to strike a direct spiritual connection with the Almighty".

== Early life and background ==
Aziz Mian Qawwal was born on 27 July 1942 (13 Rajab 1361 AH) in Uttar Pradesh, British India. According to family accounts, his birth date in the Islamic calendar coincided with the date traditionally associated with the birth of Ali ibn Abi Talib. His father, Abdul Waheed, entrusted the young Aziz Mian to his elder brother, Muhammad Bashir, who had no children of his own and had expressed a desire to raise and educate him. This early guardianship placed Aziz Mian in a spiritually rich environment, where he came under the guidance of Sufi figures such as Hazrat Muhammad Bakhsh and Tahira Sarkar.

After the independence of Pakistan in 1947, Aziz Mian migrated with his uncle's family to Lahore, where he was accommodated at the Islamia High School Sant Nagar hostel. He began his formal education there, eventually passing matriculation with distinction. Despite financial challenges, he pursued higher education, earning two master's degrees: an M.A. in Urdu Literature and an M.A. in Islamic Studies and Philosophy from the University of Punjab, Lahore. His scholarly interests also encompassed Hindu philosophy and the religious texts of Christianity and Judaism, which he studied in depth through Urdu translations.

Aziz Mian's spiritual development was shaped by Mian Muhammad Yaseen, a Chishti Nizami Sufi, who accepted him as an adopted son and guided him in the study of the Qur'an, Hadith, and classical Islamic scholarship, including commentaries of Quran by al-Suyuti and Fakhr al-Din al-Razi. He also studied Ibn Arabi's Futuhat al-Makkiyya under the eminent Maulana Abdu Salam Niazi Dehlvi in Delhi and received instruction in the Kabirpanthi tradition from Ghulam Nabi Butt, who introduced him to the poetry of Kabir.

Aziz Mian was a lifelong practitioner of qawwali, performing regularly at the shrine of Data Ganj Bakhsh in Lahore. He trained in harmonium and vocal techniques under Ustad Abdul Wahid Khan and attended the Data Ganj Baksh School for sixteen years. His early poetic talent was cultivated in literary gatherings at the Deo Samaj Hostel and under the mentorship of Khayal Amrohvi, a distinguished Persian scholar and poet. Aziz Mian first gained public recognition in seventh grade at a school mushaira, earning praise from leading poets including Hafeez Jalandhari, Agha Shorish Kashmiri, and Habib Jalib.

Throughout his life, Aziz Mian combined scholarly learning, spiritual practice, and musical performance, becoming one of the most celebrated qawwals of the Indian subcontinent. His work reflects a unique synthesis of Sufi philosophy, classical literature, and devotional music, earning him recognition for both intellectual depth and artistic mastery.

== Career ==
Aziz Mian was one of the non-traditional Pakistani Qawwals. His voice was raspy and powerful. Aziz Mian was the only prominent qawwal to write his own lyrics (though, like others, he also performed poetry written by others). Aziz Mian was a contemporary and often a competitor of the Sabri Brothers.

=== Early career ===
Aziz Mian's entry into the world of qawwali occurred unexpectedly. After migrating from Delhi with his family, they were accommodated in a room at the Deo Samaj Hostel near Islamia High School. Among the few belongings in that room was a harmonium, which Aziz Mian initially treated as a toy. Over time, merely by playing with it, he began to produce basic melodies. One day, while attempting to sing a Naat he had memorized in school, he realized that the harmonium's notes were aligning with his voice. His naturally melodious tone further encouraged him to practice regularly. Through daily self-training, he learned to perform several Naats on the harmonium. During this period, his family faced severe financial hardship: his uncle, the family's sole breadwinner, fell seriously ill, and their remaining possessions were spent on medical treatment. One day, while singing a Naat outside their room, a neighbor, Muhammad Usman, casually suggested that if he sang at the shrine of Ali Hujwiri (Data Ganj Bakhsh), he might receive appreciation and some monetary support. Though said lightly, the remark deeply influenced the young Aziz Mian. Soon after, overhearing a distressing conversation between his uncle and aunt about borrowing money for survival, Aziz Mian resolved to act. He wrapped the harmonium in a cloth, placed it on his shoulder, and went directly to Data Darbar. At the shrine, where senior qawwals were performing on a formal stage, he sat beneath a banyan tree and began singing the Naats he had practiced. His powerful and melodious voice quickly drew a large crowd, who responded by offering coins and currency. Within two hours, he collected 23 rupees—a substantial amount at the time. He used the money to buy groceries and medicine for his family and returned home with the remaining balance, astonishing his aunt with the amount he had earned. When she asked where the money had come from, he simply replied that he had found "the place from where the money comes." Upon hearing the full account, his uncle was moved to tears and prayed for his success. From that day forward, performing qawwali at Data Darbar every Thursday became his routine, enabling him to provide for his household and support his uncle's recovery. Even after his uncle regained health, Aziz Mian continued performing, explaining that he could now sustain the family better than before.

During his school years, Aziz Mian frequently participated in campfire events held at Islamia High School, Sant Nagar. He formed a small qawwali group with his classmates, and under the supervision of their science teacher, Muhammad Yusuf—who had a strong interest in music—the group regularly competed in inter-school and provincial competitions. Aziz Mian's party consistently won first prizes, bringing multiple trophies to the school and earning recognition across Punjab. The first qawwali with which his group won a campfire competition was titled "Peena Haram Hai Na Pilana Haram Hai."

Aziz Mian continued to perform regularly every Thursday at the shrine of Data Ganj Bakhsh in Lahore, singing naats beneath a particular banyan tree where he had begun his early devotional practice. After some time, he added a tabla player, Baba Din Muhammad, which marked the next step in his musical development. A major turning point came when a wedding party visiting Lahore requested him to perform at a private gathering in Bhaati Gate. With his uncle and aunt's permission, he accepted. The event was attended by the renowned poet Ustad Qamar Jalalvi, who was so impressed by Aziz Mian's performance that he gifted him a ghazal titled "Mareez-e-Mohabbat unhi ka fasana" Aziz Mian composed a melody for it on the spot, and his powerful rendition created an atmosphere of deep spiritual emotion. This first private performance brought him immediate recognition. Following this event, large crowds began gathering at Data Darbar every Thursday, requesting the same ghazal. Among his admirers was Ilyas Dahi, the chairman of Wan Radharam in Okara, who became a regular listener and would reward Aziz Mian generously—often giving one hundred rupees, a significant amount at the time. This period marked the beginning of Aziz Mian's rise to public fame.

After nearly ten years of performing underneath a banyan tree inside Daata Darbar, he experienced a profound spiritual moment that he regarded as a turning point in his poetic and musical maturity. The following week, stage organizers at Data Darbar unexpectedly invited him to perform on the main platform. His powerful rendition captivated the large crowd, who showered the stage with money; even senior qawwals who arrived later could not perform due to the overwhelming response. Organizers called it one of the most extraordinary performances they had witnessed. Aziz Mian returned home with unprecedented earnings and informed his uncle that he had begun his true artistic path. Both his uncle and his spiritual guide offered prayers and blessings, marking this event as the decisive beginning of his rise as a prominent qawwal. After his memorable performance at Data Darbar, Aziz Mian became well-known across Lahore, especially during Rabiʿ al-Awwal and Mawlid gatherings. His growing fame soon took him to a major qawwali concert in Lahore Cantonment, organized by prominent local hosts, where several senior Army officers noticed his talent. Impressed by his powerful style, the Military Police invited him the very next day to perform at a regimental dinner. His success there opened the doors to regular invitations from Army units across Pakistan. From Gwadar to Gilgit, he travelled to distant posts and high-altitude stations, and this close connection with the Army played a major role in expanding his national and later international recognition.

Aziz Mian maintained a close artistic association with the Pakistan Army, and frequently performed for military audiences—a connection he regarded as a point of pride. During one such period, Army Chief General Yahya Khan requested that he render the regimental anthem of the Baloch Regiment in a qawwali style and asked to hear it the same evening. Despite having no time for rehearsal or composition, Aziz Mian agreed. At the scheduled event that night, he performed the anthem in a qawwali rhythm for the first time, creating a strong impact on the audience. General Yahya Khan was reportedly so impressed that he asked for multiple repetitions throughout the night. The rendition later became widely popular within the regiment and was subsequently recorded. Aziz Mian's association with the Baloch Regiment deepened to the extent that General Yahya Khan informally referred to him as the "Balochi Qawwal."

During the period when Pakistani military units regularly hosted his performances, Aziz Mian was invited by Corps Commander Major General A. A. K. Niazi to perform before the visiting Shah of Iran, Mohammad Reza Pahlavi, in Lahore. At the official dinner arranged in the Shah's honour, Aziz Mian presented Persian poetry in the Pahlavi dialect, which reportedly impressed the Shah.

Shortly afterwards, through the Pakistan National Council of the Arts and at the request of Faiz Ahmed Faiz, he traveled to Iran for what he believed would be a routine qawwali program. Upon arrival, he learned that he had been entered into the Jashn-e-Honarmandaan-e-Alam, an international arts festival established by the Shah. After initial engagements in Tehran, he was taken to Shiraz, where participating artists from across Asia, Europe, Africa, Australia, and the Americas were accommodated.

Aziz Mian was formally received by Iranian cultural officials and housed as an official guest. Before the competitive stage event, he performed at Bagh-e-Eram in a private royal gathering attended by the Shah, Empress Farah Pahlavi, the Prime Minister of Iran, and senior officials. His renditions in classical Persian—including verses of Jami and Hafiz—were well received, and the session extended far beyond the planned duration. The following day, Iranian newspapers quoted Empress Farah praising Aziz Mian for his command of the complete works of Hafiz. In the festival's Asian category, Aziz Mian secured first place, attributed to his mastery of Persian diction and classical poetic repertoire. He advanced to the final international round, held at the mausoleum of Hafiz in Shiraz, where artists from five regions competed. Despite having only a small ensemble compared to other international performers, his Persian and Urdu presentations drew strong acclaim from the audience. At the conclusion of the event, the judges awarded him the gold medal, making him the winning performer of the festival. This victory marked a major milestone in Aziz Mian's early international career and played a significant role in introducing and popularizing Pakistani qawwali among Iranian audiences.

Aziz Mian also performed for the Shah of Iran during the 2,500-year coronation celebrations held at Persepolis. Invited as Pakistan's representative qawwal in the official cultural delegation, he took part in the post-coronation variety show, where his performance was highly appreciated by the Shah, the attending heads of state, and international diplomats. The President of Pakistan of that time, present as part of the delegation, also witnessed his performance. During his first tour of Iran in 1967, when he performed in front of the Shah of Iran, Mohammad Reza Pahlavi. The Shah of Iran was so moved by his performance that he gave Aziz Mian a gold medal. From this moment on, Aziz Mian gained popularity and started releasing albums. In addition to singing Qawwalis, he was also an expert at singing ghazals. He became a noted member of the qawwal community due to his unique and crisp voice. though he also enjoyed success in more ashiqana sufi qawwalis.

After returning from Iran, Aziz Mian continued his regular performances. However, due to the growing demand from Iranian audiences, he soon returned to Tehran, where he performed for both the Pakistani embassy and local gatherings for over two and a half months. His qawwalis were regularly broadcast on Iranian radio and television, gaining widespread popularity. Upon returning to Pakistan, during the political unrest leading up to General Yahya Khan's presidency and the country's subsequent division, Aziz Mian was summoned by Corps Commander General Abdul Ali Malik. He dedicated three months performing at military posts to boost the morale of Pakistani soldiers, earning recognition for his contribution to the armed forces. In the early days of his career, he was nicknamed Fauji Qawwal (Urdu: فوجی قوال) (meaning "Military Qawwal") because most of his early stage-performances were in military barracks for the army personnel. He was known for a "more recitative, more dramatic diction" and was inclined toward qawwali's religious rather than entertainment qualities.

Aziz Mian began releasing records through the EMI Pakistan label and quickly gained popularity. By the 1970s, his fame had grown significantly as he performed at major events and appeared on Pakistan Television (PTV), where his powerful voice and unique style reached a wider audience. He was fond of discussing religious and Sufi paradoxes in his qawwalis. He directly addressed Allah and complained about the misery of man, the greatest creation of the Almighty. In addition to his own poetry, Aziz Mian performed poetry by Allama Iqbal, and a number of contemporary Urdu poets, including Qamar Jalalvi, Jigar Moradabadi, Tabish Kanpuri, S. M. Sadiq, Saifuddin Saif and Qateel Shifai.

=== 1970s ===
In the 1970s, he toured India, performing in several cities to enthusiastic audiences. In Mumbai, a city renowned for its rich musical heritage and a hub for prominent musicians, poets, and qawwals, a promoter arranged fifteen programs for him. During his stay, he met eminent artists, including Kalyanji-Anandji, Naushad, Lata Mangeshkar, Asha Bhosle, and Qawwal Kaami Devi. His first performance was held at a central hall with a military band welcoming the audience. His unique style quickly gained widespread acclaim, leading to numerous concerts across the city. One notable program, Laylat al-Qawwali, attracted audiences from across India, including scholars, celebrities, and government officials. The Maharashtra Chief Minister personally praised his performance, calling it the pinnacle of qawwali. Aziz Mian's concerts in Mumbai were significant in reviving the art of qawwali in the city, elevating it from entertainment to a recognized, respected classical form, appreciated for its spiritual depth and lyrical richness.

During this tour, Aziz Mian also visited Delhi. He went to the shrines of Hazrat Haray Bhare and Sarmad Kashani near the Red Fort, where he learned of a qawwali competition being held that night with seven other Indian qawwals. He requested to perform last so he could observe the styles and procedures of the other participants, and his request was approved. He was also provided accommodation and some financial support.

The competition was held in the parade ground between the Red Fort and the Jama Masjid, near the shrine of Sarmad. Aziz Mian arrived with a small party consisting of a tabla player and three chorus members. The venue was packed with spectators, and he was introduced along with the seven other qawwals. Topics for each performance were selected by drawing slips from a basket, and Aziz Mian's assigned theme was: Main kya jaanoon Ram tera Gorakh dhanda ("What do I know of Ram, and your mysterious ways?").

Observing the previous seven performers, Aziz Mian began his performance with the opening verse:

Har gyaani thak ke haar gaya is jung ke paar, lagane mein insan ne kya kya, roop kaise, is tere ajaaib khane mein
(Every learned one has grown weary and failed to cross this battle; what has man not tried, and yet what wonders lie in your mysterious abode?)

He continued for over an hour, presenting verses on the assigned theme with his chorus. His performance impressed the audience and judges alike, and he was declared the winner of the competition. This event marked a major breakthrough, establishing his name in Delhi and enhancing his reputation in India.

Aziz Mian performed in front of the Sultan of Abu Dhabi in Lahore and received widespread appreciation. A few days later, he received an official invitation from the Sultan and traveled to Abu Dhabi. The qawwali performance took place at the royal palace, attended by members of the royal family and select guests. Aziz Mian presented Arabic poetry in his distinctive style, earning high praise and honors. Following this, he also performed a grand program at the Pakistan Cultural Center in Abu Dhabi, which further enhanced his reputation.

While still in Abu Dhabi, Aziz Mian was invited by the local Pakistani community to perform in the beautifully appointed Al-Nasr Hall. The event was attended by a large audience, and he later had the opportunity to perform again in front of the royal family. His popularity spread across the region, reaching Bahrain, where the Pakistani ambassador invited him to a charity show. The proceeds from this event were donated for the construction of schools for Pakistani children in Bahrain. Aziz Mian continued to perform several programs across Bahrain, including special performances for schools and local communities, further cementing his stature as a leading qawwal in the Gulf region. Prime Minister Zulfiqar Ali Bhutto invited Aziz Mian to perform in a qawwali concert in Islamabad in early 1976.

=== 1980s ===
In the 1980s, Aziz Mian was at the height of his fame and had toured many of the world’s major countries. Of the remarkable events in his life, Thursday, April 28, 1983, held particular significance. He regarded that night as unforgettable.

After returning from Bahrain, Aziz Mian resumed his regular programs in Pakistan. While performing at a student-organized gathering in Sargodha, he experienced an intense spiritual sensation during a late-night devotional piece, reciting the verses:

Tadapte hain, machalte hain bohot armaan seene mein, Rawaana hote hai jab qaafile Hajj ke maheene mein,
bhala ye kaise mumkin hai mohabbat ke qareene mein, maza kya khaak aaye door reh kar aise jeene mein,
Parwana yahan tadpe, aur jale shama Madine mein.

(Translation:
Hearts yearn and burn with longing deep within,
When the caravan passes here in the month of Hajj, how can this be possible?
What joy is there in love if one lives far away?
Here, the moth struggles and burns for the flame in Medina.)

This profound experience inspired him to undertake a pilgrimage to the Holy Land. Preparing for Hajj and Umrah with his companions, he carried his musical instruments, anticipating a possible performance at the Pakistani embassy in Jeddah. However, divine providence had something greater in store. Upon reaching Mecca and completing Umrah, Aziz Mian was unexpectedly given permission by the Amir of Mecca to perform qawwali in front of the Kaaba—a distinction unprecedented in the 1,400-year history of Islam.

The qawwali gathering was held at a high ground near Bab Abdul Aziz, from where the Kaaba was clearly visible. On 28 April 1983, Thursday evening, Aziz Mian and his companions arrived at the venue, which featured a beautifully arranged stage and carpeted floor seating. Due to restrictions on placing structures directly in front of the Kaaba, a single stage deck was used. By 9 p.m., a large audience had gathered, unable to believe that a qawwali assembly was being held so close to the sacred site.

As Aziz Mian began, tears welled up in his eyes upon seeing the Kaaba. He first recited Hamd with a tearful devotion, creating a profound spiritual atmosphere for the audience. Devotees showered him with dinars as offerings. Following the Hamd, he performed his all-time blockbuster qawwalis, including Nabi Nabi Ya Nabi Nabi, Allah Hi Jaane Kaun Bashar Hai, and Teri Soorat / Main Sharabi, along with Naats, salutations, and the poetic work of Jami, before concluding with prayers.

Though only a few hours long, this performance is regarded as one of the most historically significant events in the history of qawwali. It marked the pinnacle of recognition for Aziz Mian's art. The event became widely renowned, attracting people from distant parts of Saudi Arabia to witness and congratulate him. Even Pakistani military units stationed in remote areas, upon learning of the event, organized gatherings to honor him. The memory of performing qawwali before the Kaaba remained a lasting and cherished spiritual milestone in Aziz Mian's life.

Aziz Mian made another visit to Iran during 1980s, he played a notable role in reintroducing South Asian Sufi devotional performance to Iran at a time when interest in classical Sufi traditions had diminished. During his early visits, he performed Persian Sufi poetry and emphasized Iran's historic contribution to the development of Sufism, which earned him recognition among audiences familiar with Persian literary and spiritual heritage.

After the 1979 Iranian Revolution, the cultural and religious environment of Iran changed significantly. In this period, the Iranian Embassy in Pakistan organized an official event in Islamabad to mark the anniversary of the Revolution, for which Aziz Mian was invited as the principal performer. His recitation of Persian Sufi verses received strong acclaim, and a recording of the event was later broadcast on Iranian television, where it was reportedly viewed and appreciated by Ruhollah Khomeini.

Following the broadcast, Aziz Mian received a formal invitation from the Government of Iran, conveyed through Pakistan's Ministry of Foreign Affairs. Upon his arrival in Tehran, he was received with official protocol by the Iranian Ministry of Culture and performed a series of programs across the country.

The most significant aspect of this visit was his private audience with Khomeini, which lasted over an hour. Their conversation centered on Sufism and its metaphysical doctrines. At the end of the meeting, Khomeini remarked with a smile, Aziz, Ibn Rushd's ideas seem to have a deep influence on you. Aziz Mian responded by saying that he was influenced not only by Ibn Rushd but also by Kabir. Khomeini presented Aziz Mian with a special silver plaque engraved with the word "Allah" in gold, and gifted a wallet to his son Imran Aziz.

=== 1990s ===
During the 1990s, Aziz Mian remained a prominent figure in Pakistan’s qawwali landscape. He appeared frequently on Pakistan Television (PTV) and recorded several notable albums for Sonic Enterprises and Oriental Star Agencies. Throughout the decade, he continued his extensive tours of the United States, the United Kingdom, and the Middle East. A significant domestic highlight of this period was his participation in the cultural programme “Wajd ki Raat”, organised annually in Lahore during Ramadan by the Jang Group’s Sports and Culture Wing. In 1993–94, Aziz Mian performed at this event alongside Nusrat Fateh Ali Khan, marking one of the rare occasions when both leading qawwals appeared on the same stage. The event included a special Jang Forum session featuring both artists, where Aziz Mian was noted for his articulate discussion on qawwali tradition and audience engagement. Their joint performance later that night at Mehndi Hall became widely remembered for its large turnout and enthusiastic reception.

Aziz Mian also continued touring internationally during this decade. Among his most notable late-career appearances was his 1998 performance in Hyderabad, India which was held at Khilwat Ground. The event was attended by Sultan Salahuddin Owaisi, then President of the All India Majlis-e-Ittehadul Muslimeen (AIMIM) and Member of Parliament for Hyderabad, along with his elder son Asaduddin Owaisi. Following the performance, Aziz Mian was presented with a commemorative Charminar memento, symbolizing the cultural heritage of Hyderabad.

=== 2000 ===
In the year 2000, Aziz Mian was invited by the Embassy of Iran in Islamabad to perform on the occasion of the 13th of Rajab, commemorating the birth anniversary of Mawlā ʿAlī (ع). His distinguished Persian-style rendition at this event drew the attention of a prominent Iranian socio-cultural organization, which subsequently extended a formal invitation for a series of performances in Iran. Despite medical advice discouraging international travel due to his declining health, Aziz Mian—who had always regarded Iran as a place of unique spiritual fulfilment and whose earliest international engagement had also been in Iran—accepted the invitation with evident enthusiasm. A contract for ten performances was finalized, and he travelled with his qawwal party, including his sons Junaid Aziz and Imran Aziz.

Upon arrival in Tehran, he was received under full official protocol and provided state hospitality throughout his stay. He was accommodated in a five-star hotel, where he rested briefly before commencing his scheduled programmes. His first performance took place at the renowned Sālār-e-Vahdat Hall, where he was ceremonially welcomed and presented a repertoire comprising an Arabic na‘t, a manqabat, and a Persian ghazal. His diction, thematic selection, and command over the Persian idiom were widely admired by the assembled audience. He later appeared in a live transmission on Tehran Television, where he delivered further Persian recitations that were praised for their clarity and emotional resonance. A formal banquet was also hosted in his honour by the leadership of the inviting organization, during which he and his accompanying party were presented with commemorative gold coins engraved with the name of Imam al-Ridā (ع). Aziz Mian further performed at the Embassy of Pakistan in Tehran, where he received an official tribute from the Ambassador.

All scheduled engagements were held in Tehran, except for the concluding performance, which took place in the city of Qom. In accordance with tradition, Aziz Mian first visited the shrine of Hazrat Fatimah al-Maʿsoomah (ع), offering prayers with visible emotional devotion. His final performance, held later that day, proved to be one of profound spiritual intensity. As he recited verses on the tragedy of Karbala, he was moved to tears, and the entire assembly responded with deep emotional participation. Although physically unwell, he maintained complete artistic composure and spiritual focus. His rendition of the famous Persian couplet—

Hadīth-e-ʿIshq do bāb ast: Karbalā o Dimishq;
Yeki Ḥusayn raqam kard, digarī Zaynab.

translated as,

The narrative of divine love comprises two chapters—Karbala and Damascus;
The first was inscribed by Husayn (ع), and the second by Zaynab (ع).

left a lasting impression on the audience. This performance ultimately became the final qawwali of Aziz Mian’s life, remembered as an expression of profound sincerity, devotion, and spiritual transcendence.

== Brawling Giants ==
Mian Bashir, residing near Shalimar Bagh in Lahore, once invited two of the era’s most eminent Qawwals to his residence during 1970s: Aziz Mian and Sabri Brothers. At the time, both artists were at the peak of their fame, their voices were widely celebrated. Although Aziz Mian had performed on numerous occasions, this was his first opportunity to present his art before a Qawwal of Sabri Brothers’s stature. Similarly, Sabri Brothers had heard Aziz Mian's recordings many times but had never experienced his performance in person. The gathering marked the first step in a friendship between the two titans of Qawwali. The famous Sabri Brothers' composition Tajdar-e-Haram and Aziz Mian’s Allah Hi Jaane Kaun Bashar Hai captivated the audience, displaying the subtle mastery and delicate artistry of both performers, leaving listeners in awe.

Despite their mutual respect, a brief episode of misunderstanding arose. During year 1976, at a program in the Islamabad Community Center, which was broadcast live on television, Sabri Brothers made remarks criticizing certain Qawwals who frequently referenced wine in their compositions—a veiled critique perceived by some to be directed at Aziz Mian’s greatest hit Mai Sharabi Qawwali by singing O Sharabi Chhod De Peena. While Aziz Mian outwardly maintained composure during the broadcast, he internally felt affronted. Over time, he channeled his response creatively into poetry, producing verses that addressed the critique while simultaneously enhancing his own popularity. Within days, his composition Haaye Kambakht Tu Ne Pi Hi Nahi circulated widely and became a major hit, demonstrating his artistic prowess and the resilience of his stature.

Despite the professional rivalry that occasionally surfaced, Aziz Mian and the Sabri Brothers maintained cordial and friendly relations in their personal lives. According to Mehmood Ghaznavi Sabri, the youngest of the Sabri Brothers, Aziz Mian placed a lengthy telephone call to Maqbool Ahmed Sabri following the passing of their elder brother, Ghulam Farid Sabri, in 1994. During this conversation, Mehmood Ghaznavi Sabri stated, both Aziz Mian and Maqbool Ahmed Sabri were moved to tears while recalling the life and legacy of Ghulam Farid Sabri, as Aziz Mian conveyed his heartfelt condolences.

Maqbool Ahmed Sabri contributed an foreword for Aziz Mian’s biography, written by former journalist Tariq Masood in 1995 during Aziz Mian’s lifetime and under his guidance. Maqbool Ahmed Sabri wrote: Documenting the life and achievements of any artist in written form is an extraordinary undertaking, particularly in an age consumed by selfish pursuits where few take the time to explore another’s life deeply. I regard Tariq Masood’s devoted effort as a genuine testament to his sincerity and dedication. Through his meticulous work, the events and circumstances of renowned Qawwal Aziz Mian’s life have been preserved for posterity. The affection and respect shown by young Tariq Masood for Mian Sahib represents a priceless tribute to the artist’s legacy.

== Death ==
Aziz Mian’s final performance during his 2000 visit to Iran was held in the city of Qom. After completing the program, he returned to his hotel room in a state of profound exhaustion and soon slipped into semi-consciousness. His speech had weakened, and his condition showed no signs of improvement, prompting his immediate admission to a hospital. He remained under medical supervision for three days. During this period, there was a brief moment of hope when he regained consciousness. In light of this development, the doctors allowed a short family visit, during which his son Junaid Aziz was taken into the ICU.

Junaid attempted to feed him soft food, but Aziz Mian declined and instead asked for water. When Junaid gave him water, Aziz Mian looked at his son with tearful eyes, and Junaid too became emotional but tried to reassure him, urging him not to worry and expressing hope for his recovery. Hearing this, a faint, meaningful smile appeared on Aziz Mian's face. Shortly thereafter, he drifted back into a coma. He was placed on a ventilator, but despite the doctors' efforts, he could not be revived and died on 6 December 2000 in Iran. The cause of his death was declared as yellow jaundice as a result of liver failure.

In view of his critical condition, his son Junaid and the other members of the qawwali party were sent back to Pakistan, while his son Imran Aziz remained with him in Tehran. Junaid came to know of his father’s passing only upon landing at Karachi Airport. Although young at the time, Imran bore the responsibility with great composure and accompanied his father’s body back to Pakistan.

After repatriation, Aziz Mian’s remains were taken to his home in Chaklala Railway Scheme, a house he had built with great care and affection only a few years earlier. There, arrangements for ritual washing and shrouding were made once again. His funeral prayers were held at Liaquat Bagh, Rawalpindi, where a large number of people from diverse walks of life gathered to pay their respects.

According to the original plan, the funeral was to be led by his longtime friend, the renowned scholar Allama Maqsood Sabri. However, upon seeing the presence of the Sajjada Nashin of Eidgah Sharif, Pir Naqeeb ur Rehman, standing in the front row, Allama Sabri stepped back out of courtesy and requested him to lead the prayer. Thus, Pir Naqeeb ur Rehman conducted the funeral prayer. The event received extensive media coverage.

Following the funeral in Rawalpindi, the body was transported to Multan, where a second funeral prayer was offered. There, too, a large number of admirers and members of the public participated, reflecting the widespread respect and affection Aziz Mian commanded across the country. He was buried in Multan, on the brink of Nau Bahar Nehar (Canal) in the shrine of Sain Naazir Hussain also known as Tootan Wali Sarkar who was his spiritual master.

== Family ==
Aziz Mian was married twice. His first wife resided in Lahore, while his second spouse lived in Rawalpindi. From his first marriage, he had seven sons and one daughter. Their names are: Ameer Khusro, Shahbaz Ali, Bu Ali, Shams Tabrez (also known as Tabraiz Aziz Mian), Junaid Aziz, Shibli, Attar, and a daughter. Among them, Shahbaz Ali and Shibli have died. Several of his Lahore-based sons, most notably Ameer Khusro, Tabraiz and Junaid Aziz continued their father's musical legacy by forming their own qawwali groups. Tabraiz Mian is however considered to be the closest to his father's style. His looks and his style are a mirror image of his father and he also toured North America for a tribute to Aziz Mian Qawwal.

Despite the intellectual abilities of Aziz Mian's children, the complexities of his domestic life affected their educational trajectories. Nevertheless, many of them pursued professional and artistic careers with determination. They are very similar in style to Aziz Mian himself and like other sons of famous qawwals (Amjad Sabri for example, or Waheed and Naveed Chishti), they usually perform many of their father's hits.

From his second marriage in Rawalpindi, Aziz Mian had two sons and two daughters. His elder son, Imran Aziz (also known as Imran Mian), was very young at the time of his father's death and assumed family responsibilities early. Imran Mian later established his own qawwali ensemble and gained recognition for preserving elements of Aziz Mian's signature style. Another son, Faran Aziz, serves as a government officer. The daughters born from his second marriage are married and settled in educated families.

== Legacy ==
- Aziz Mian Qawwal is considered one of the influential Sufi Qawwali singers of Pakistan
- His famous Qawwali Mein Sharabi, Mein Sharabi was featured in Indian movie Cocktail and was sung by his son Imran Aziz Mian
- A bridge, near his shrine, in Multan was named Aziz Mian Bridge in his memory.

== Awards and recognition ==
- His First International Tour was of Iran during 1966, where he performed his first international performance before the Shah of Iran, Mohammad Reza Pahlavi, who awarded him a gold medal after the performance.
- For his service in music, the Government of Pakistan awarded him the Pride of Performance in 1989.

== Works ==
Aziz Mian Qawwal received worldwide recognition and fame with his masterful works and earned the title of One of the Greatest Qawwals. Some of his qawwalis include:

- Teri Soorat Nigahon Mein Phirti Rahe / Main Sharabi Main Sharabi

(Lyrics by – Tabish Kanpuri & Aziz Mian)

- Allah Hi Jaane Kaun Bashar Hai

(Lyrics by – Aziz Mian)

- Nabi Nabi Ya Nabi Nabi

(Lyrics by – Aziz Mian)

- Aadmi Hai Benazir

(Lyrics by – Abdul Hamid Alam)

- Meri Daastan E Hasrat

(Lyrics by – Saifuddin Saif)

- Naseem E Subha Gulshan Mein

(Lyrics by – Allama Simab Akbarabadi & Aziz Mian)

- Bewafa Yun Tera Muskurana Bhool Jaane Ke Qaabil Nahi Hai

(Lyrics by – Tabish Kanpuri & Aziz Mian)

- Haaye Kambakht Tu Ne Pi Hi Nahi

(Lyrics by – Aziz Mian)

- Unki Aakhon Se Masti Barasti Rahe

(Lyrics by – Abdul Hamid Alam & Aziz Mian)

- Aasman Se Utaara Gaya

(Lyrics by – Nazeer Banarasi & Aziz Mian)

- Kabhi Kaha Na Kisi Se / Daba Ke Chal Diye

(Lyrics by – Ustaad Qamar Jalalvi & Aziz Mian)

- Mere Khoon E Arzoo / Ye Maqam E Zindagani

(Lyrics by – Purnam Allahbadi & Aziz Mian)

- Woh Dil Hi Kya Tere Milne Ki Jo Dua Na Kare

(Lyrics by – Qateel Shifai & Aziz Mian)

- Main Kya Janu Ram Tera Gorakh Dhandha

(Lyrics by – Kabir Das, Allama Iqbal, & Aziz Mian)

- Jannat Mujhe Mile Na Mile

(Lyrics by – Aziz Mian)

- Hashr Ke Roz Main Poochoonga

(Lyrics by – Aziz Mian)

- Meri Arzoo Muhammad / Na Kaleem Ka Tassawur

== Albums ==
- 1973 Mein Sharabi, Mein Sharabi by Aziz Mian (EMI Pakistan)
- 1976 Allah Hi Jaane Kaun Bashar Hai (EMI Pakistan)
- 1977 Aziz Mian Qawwal & Party (EMI Pakistan)
- 1978 Baksh Deta Toh Baat Kuch Bhi Na Thi (EMI Pakistan)
- 1978 Is Tere Sar Ki Qasam (EMI Pakistan)
- 1978 Voh Dil Hi Kya Tere Milne Ki Jo Dua Na Kare (EMI Pakistan)
- 1979 Aziz Mian & Others – Teri Soorat Nigahon Mei Phirti Rahe / Main Sharabi (EMI Pakistan)
- 1979 Ashk Aankho Mei Thamte Nahi Hai (Emi Pakistan)
- 1979 Ik Mard E Qalandar (Shalimar Recording Company Pakistan / Multitone Records)
- 1980 Nabi Nabi Ya Nabi Nabi (EMI Pakistan)
- 1980 Ye Mai Hai Zara Sonch (EMI Pakistan)
- 1980 Aaj Ki Raat Hai (EMI Pakistan)
- 1980 Aziz Mian Qawwal (EMI Pakistan)
- 1980 Tarrapte Hai Machalte Hai (Shalimar Recording Company Pakistan / Multitone Records)
- 1981 Aziz Mian Ka Wada (EMI Pakistan)
- 1981 Aziz Mian Vol.1 (EMI Pakistan)
- 1981 Aziz Mian Vol.2 (EMI Pakistan)
- 1982 Aankh Barsi Hai Tere Naam Pe (EMI Pakistan)
- 1982 Tha Bhi Mai Aur Hoo Bhi Mai (EMI Pakistan)
- 1983 Yeh Paisa Kya Karega (EMI Pakistan)
- 1983 Mitti Ki Moorat (EMI Pakistan)
- 1983 Shahbaz Qalandar (EMI Pakistan)
- 1983 Soey Maikada Na Jaate (EMI Pakistan)
- 1984 Hashr Ke Roz Volume – 1 & 2 (EMI Pakistan)
- 1984 Jannat Mujhe Mile Na Mile (EMI Pakistan)
- 1984 Ae Ri Mai Toh Prem Deewani (EMI Pakistan)
- 1985 Aasman Se Utaara Gaya (EMI Pakistan)
- 1985 Jalwo Se Muhammad (S) Ke (EMI Pakistan)
- 1986 Rag Rag Bole Rasool (S) Meri (EMI Pakistan)
- 1986 Bhala Hua Kabeera (EMI Pakistan)
- 1990 Is Daur Ke Insaan Se Kuch Bhool Hui Hai (EMI Pakistan)
- 1990 Greatest Hits Of Aziz Mian (EMI Pakistan)
- 1992 Milegi Shaikh Ko Jannat (OSA Records)
- 1993 Sharabee Sharabee Teri Soorat (OSA Records)
- 1993 Sharabee Live in England (OSA Records)
- 1994 Qalandar Mast Qalandar Vol.5 (OSA Records)
- 1994 Takhti Vol.30 (OSA Records)
- 1994 Taj Dar E Haram Vol.32 (OSA Records)
- 1994 Shaam Pae Gayee (OSA Records)
- 1995 Wadah (OSA Records)
- 1995 Saaya E Mustafa Hussain (OSA Records)
- 1995 Sajdah (OSA Records)
- 1995 Rut Albeli Raat Suhani Vol.4 (OSA Records)
- 1995 Naseem E Subha (OSA Records)
- 1995 Dhoom (OSA Records)
- 1995 Allah Hi Jaane Vol.14 (OSA Records)
- 1996 Mere Khoon E Arzoo Ko (Sonic Enterprises)
- 1996 Khwaja Piya (OSA Records)
- 1996 Khwaja Ki Deewani (OSA Records)
- 1996 Ishq Mei Ham (OSA Records)
- 1996 Dil Jala (OSA Records)
- 1996 Bhar Do Jholi (OSA Records)
- 1996 Bewafa Vol.15 (OSA Records)
- 1997 Jannat Mujhe Mile (OSA Records)
- 1997 Allah Hi Jane Live in England (OSA Records)
- 1997 Akhian Dee Gali (OSA records)
- 1997 Jaisi Karni Waisi Bharni (MovieBox UK)
- 1997 Allah Bahot Bada Hai (Moviebox Birmingham)
- 1998 Shikwa Jawab E Shikwa (OSA Records)
- 1999 Maati Ke Putle(OSA Records)
- 1999 Chaadar Fatima Ki (OSA Records)
- 1999 Humen Toh Loot Liya (Hi-Tech Music)
- 1999 Bade Badnaseeb Theh Hum (Hi-Tech Music)
- 2003 Nas Nas Bole Nabi Nabi (S) (OSA Records)
- 2003 Duniya Ka Ajeeb Bazaar – Last Recording (OSA Records)
- 2007 Mere Saamne Reh (OSA Records)
- 2014 Hum Kaise Guzaara Karte Hai (EMI Pakistan)

Contributing artist

- 1987 Sher E Yazdaan Ali Ali (EMI Pakistan)
- 1987 Maikhana – Aziz Miyan & Sabri Brothers (EMI Pakistan)
- 2004 Main Sharabi – Aziz Mian & Sabri Brothers Qawwal (OSA Records)
- 2006 The Best Qawwali Album in the World Ever – Nusrat Fateh Ali Khan, The Sabri Brothers & Aziz Mian (EMI Pakistan)
