= Raja Gidh =

1981 novel by Bano Qudsia

- Author: Bano Qudsia
- Original title: راجه گدھ
- Language: Urdu
- Genre: Novel
- Publisher: Sang-e-Meel
- Publication date: 1981
- Publication place: Pakistan
- Media type: Print
- ISBN: 969-35-0514-X
- OCLC: 276769393

Raja Gidh (Urdu: راجه گدھ) by Bano Qudsia is an Urdu novel. Gidh is the Urdu word for a vulture and Raja is an Urdu synonym for king. The name anticipates the kingdom of vultures. In fact, parallel to the main plot of the novel, an allegorical story of such a kingdom is narrated. The metaphor of the vulture as an animal feeding mostly on the carcasses of dead animals is employed to portray the trespassing of ethical limits imposed by the society or by religion.

The novel was first published in 1981 and such has been its popularity that on average, "a new edition has come out every year".

== See also ==
- Bano Qudsia
