= Qamar Jalalvi =

Pakistani poet

Qamar Jalalvi قمَر جلالوی
- Born: Muhammad Hussain; 1887; Jalali, Aligarh, British India
- Died: 24 October 1968; Karachi, Pakistan
- Occupation: Poet

Qamar Jalalvi (1887–1968, Urdu: قمَر جلالوی) (born Muhammad Husain and also known as Ustad Qamar Jalalvi) was a Pakistani poet, author and writer.

== Early life ==
He was born in Jalali near Aligarh, British India, 1887, and died on 4 October 1968. After the creation of Pakistan in 1947, he moved to Karachi.

== Life ==
Qamar Jalalvi is regarded as one of the best classical Urdu Ghazal poets. His ghazal poetry has a unique simplicity of expression.

A poet from the age of eight, Qamar Jalalvi's writing had become quite popular by the time he was in his 20s.

He lived a life of financial hardship, working for many years at bicycle repair shops. In India and Pakistan, a teacher of arts is known as Ustad (master), and the term is also loosely used to refer to any skilled worker. Qamar Jalalvi was initially called Ustad because of his bicycle work. Popular with critics for his mastery of poetry as well, they dubbed him Ustad Qamar Jalalvi once his poetry became popular.

Ustad Qamar Jalalvi died in Karachi, Pakistan, on 4 October 1968.

== Books ==
The collections of ghazals include:

1. Rashk-e Qamar (رشکِ قمَر)
2. Auj-e Qamar (اَوجِ قمَر)
3. Tajalliyat-e Qamar (تجلّیاتِ قمَر)
4. Gham-e-Javedan (غمِ جاوِداں)
5. Aaye Hain Woh Mazaar Pe (آئیں ہیں وہ مزار پہ)
6. Daba Ke Chal Diye Sab Qabr Mein (دبا کے قبر میں سب چل دیے)

== See also ==
- Qamar Ajnalvi
- Qamar Jalalabadi
