= List of ambassadors of Pakistan =

List of ambassadors of Pakistan may refer to:

- List of ambassadors of Pakistan to China
- List of ambassadors of Pakistan to France
- List of ambassadors of Pakistan to Saudi Arabia
- List of ambassadors of Pakistan to the United States
- List of ambassadors of Pakistan to United Nations
