= Nasir Abbas Nayyar =

Pakistani writer, critic, and essayist

Nasir Abbas Nayyar ناصر عباس نیر
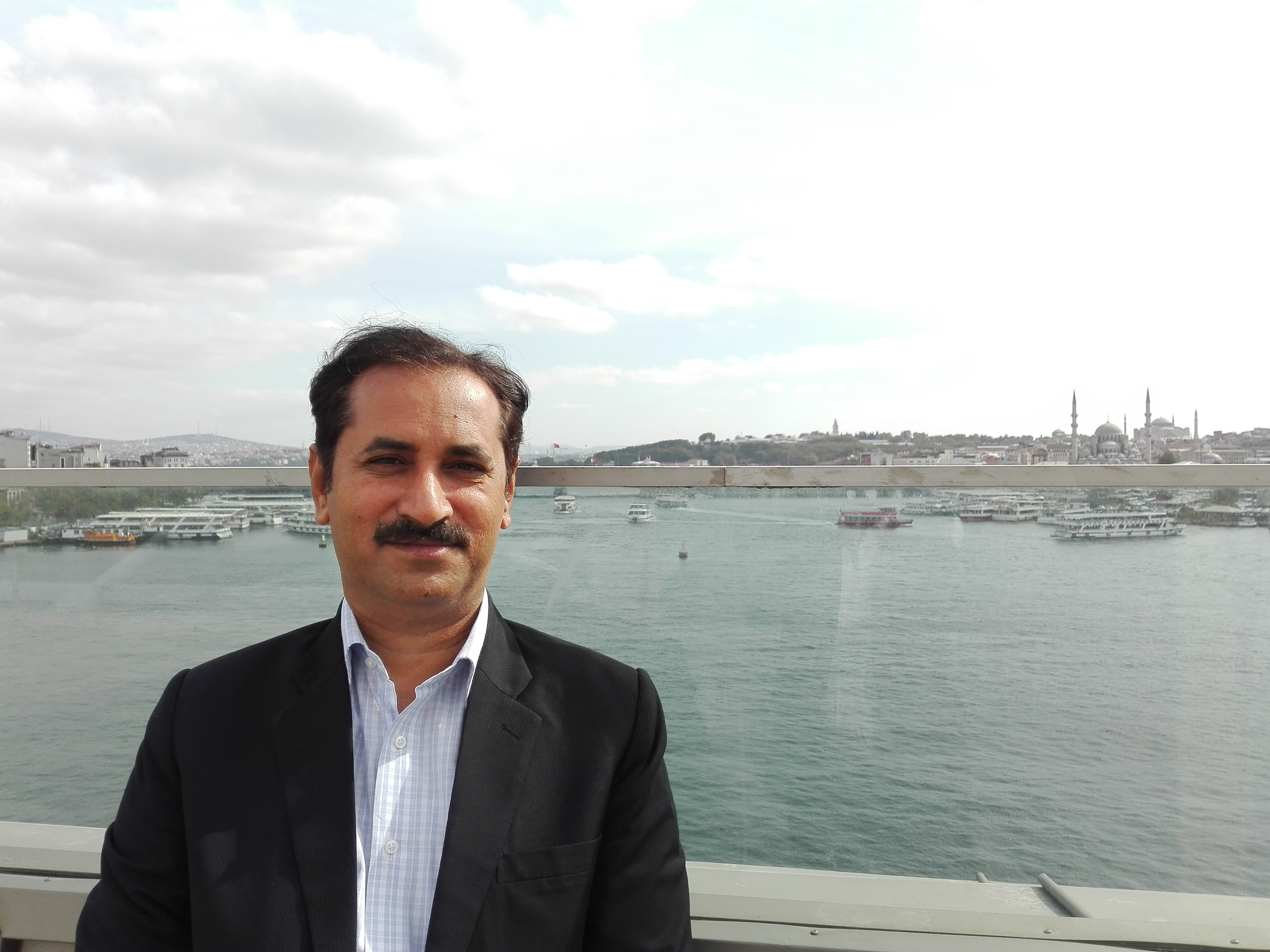
- Nasir Abbas in Istanbul
- Born: Nasir Abbas ناصر عباس; 25 April 1965 (age 61); Jhang, Pakistan
- Citizenship: Pakistan
- Education: Ph.D Urdu - Government College (University) Faisalabad, Pakistan
- Occupations: Urdu writer; essayist; critic; columnist; instructor at LUMS
- Spouse: Tahira Asmat
- Children: Armughan Ahmad, Usama Ali, Areeb Shahnaz
- Writing career
- Notable works: Jadid or Mabad Jadid Tanqid, Lisaniat or Tanqid, Matn, Siaq or Tanzur, Mabad Nau Abadiat( Urdu Kay Tanzur MeiN), Majid Amjid(Hayat, Sheriat or Jamaliat), Saqafti Shankht or Istemari Ijara Dari, Urdu Adab ki Tashkeel e Jadid
- Notable awards: Tamgha-e-Imtiaz (2025)
- Website: nasirabbasnayyar.com

Nasir Abbas Nayyar (Urdu: ناصر عباس نیر) is a Pakistani Urdu language writer, critic, columnist, and essayist. He has written books on poetry, literary theory and post colonial study of Urdu literature. He has produced some important books on structuralism and postmodernism and their influence on Urdu literature. A book on life and poetics of Majid Amjid is another his significant contribution. His most famous work is on Postcolonial Study of Urdu Literature published by Oxford University Press, Karachi, Pakistan titled Mabad Nau Abadiat (Urdu Kay Tanazur Mein ) and Urdu Adab ki Tashkeel e Jadid. His books on post colonialism proved ground breaking works in Urdu.

He has regularly written on literary issues in The News and Dawn.

== Personal life ==
Nayyar was born on 25 April 1965 in a village of Jhang. He did his matriculation from Govt. High School Shorkot in 1981. He did his Master in Urdu from Government College University (Faisalabad) in 1990. He got his Ph.D. degree from Bahauddin Zakariya University, Multan. He was awarded a post-doctoral fellowship by (Deutscher Akademischer Austauschdienst) to pursue a research on Urdu courses of colonial period at Heidelberg University in 2011.

== Career ==
He is serving as professor at Institute of Urdu Language & Literature, Punjab University, Lahore in Urdu Literature . He is an honorary Editor of Bunyad - A Journal of Urdu Studies Editorial Team since 2020.

He served as Director General of Urdu Science Board from December, 2017 till December, 2020.

== Awards ==
His book Urdu Adab ki Tashkeel e Jadid won the best Urdu Book prize in at KLF 2017 and Uss Ko Ikk Shakhs Samajhna Tou Munasib Hi Nahin won the UBL Literary Award for Best Urdu Non-Fiction book in 2019. In 2025, he received the Tamgha-i-Imtiaz from the President of Pakistan.

== Bibliography ==
Books

- Din Dhal Chuka Tha (1993) (Urdu: دن ڈھل چکا تھا)
- Chiragh Afreedam (2000) (Urdu: چراغ آفریدم)
- Jadidiat Say Pas e Jadidiat Tak (2000) (Urdu: جدیدیت سے پس جدیدیت تک)
- Jadid or Mabad Jadid Tanqid (2004, 2013) (Urdu: جدید اور مابعد جدید تنقید)
- Lisaniat or Tanqid (2009, 2014, 2015) (Urdu: لسانیات اور تنقید)
- Matn, Siaq or Tanzur (2013,2014) (Urdu: متن، سیاق اور تناظر)
- Mabad Nau Abadiat, Urdu kay Tanzur MeiN (2013) (Urdu: مابعد نو آبادیات، اردو کے تناظر میں)
- Majid Amjid, Hayat, Sherait or Jamaliat (2014), (Urdu: مجید امجد ، حیات ، شعریات اور جمالیات)
- Saqafti Shankht or Istemari Ijaradari (2014) (Urdu: ثقافتی شناخت اور استعماری اجارہ داری)
- Aalamgiriat aur Urdu Aur Deegar Mazameen (2015) (Urdu: عالمگیریت اور اردو)
- Urdu Adab ki Tashkeel e Jadid (2016) (Urdu: اردو ادب کی تشکیل جدید)
- Khaak ki Mehak (2016) (Urdu: خاک کی مہک)
- Uss Ko Ikk Shakhs Samajhna Tou Munasib Hi Nahin (2017) (Urdu: اس کو ایک شخص سمجھنا تو مناسب نہیں)
- HEIDELBERG KI DIARY (2017) Sang-e-meel Publications (Urdu: ہائیڈل برگ کی ڈائری)
- Farishta Nahi Aaya (2017)Sang-e-meel Publications (Urdu: فرشتہ نہیں آیا)
- Nazam Kaisay Parhain (2018) (Urdu: نظم کیسے پڑھیں)
- Raakh Se Likhi Gai Kitaab (2018) Sang-e-meel Publications (Urdu: راکھ سے لکھی گئی کتاب)
- Coloniality, Modernity and Urdu Literature (2020) Coloniality, Modernity and Urdu Literature - Dr. Nasir Abbas Nayyer
- Aik Zamana Khatam Hua Hai (2020) Aik Zamana Khatam Hua Hai - Dr. Nasir Abbas Nayyer (Urdu: ایک زمانہ ختم ہوا ہے)
- Jadeediyat aur Nauabadiyaat (2021) Jadeediyat aur Nauabadiyaat (Urdu: جدیدیت اور نو آبادیات)
- Yeh Qissa Kya Hai Maani Ka (2022) Yeh Qissa Kya Hai Maani Ka - Dr. Nasir Abbas Nayyer (Urdu: یہ قصہ کیا ہے معنی کا)
- Naye Naqaad ke Naam Khatoot (2023) Naye Naqaad ke Naam Khatoot - Dr. Nasir Abbas Nayyer (Urdu: نئے نقاد کے نام خطوط)
- Jab Tak Hai Zameen (2025) (Urdu: جب تک ہے زمین)

== See also ==
- List of Pakistani writers
- List of Urdu writers
- Wazir Agha
- Majeed Amjad
