= Southwest Festival of the Written Word =

Southwest Word Fiesta (SWWF), formerly known as The Southwest Festival of the Written Word, is a biennial non-profit literary festival held in Silver City, New Mexico, USA, typically in late September or late October. The festival was founded in 2013 by several local community members, including professor and poet Bonnie Buckley Maldonado, poet Larry Godfrey, screenwriter and former television actor Jim Kelly, and former director of the Silver City Museum Susan Berry. The festival is supported by major cultural institutions in Silver City, such as Western New Mexico University, the Public Library, and the Western Institute for Lifelong Learning.

SWWF's mission is to celebrate the written and spoken word, bringing together creators and appreciators with a focus on community involvement. The use of the word "celebrate" in the mission statement reflects the joy that the power and freedom of written words can bring. The festival creates a crossroads for individuals from different regions, including Arizona, Texas, Colorado, and New Mexico, to come together and discuss literature, publishing, and related topics.

Between festivals, the organization offers various programs, including writers' workshops, school visits, book launches, and the Poet Laureate Program, which was conceived by Jim Kelly. The festival has seen the participation of well over 100 authors, including both well-known and first-time writers, with the expectation of a larger number in the future. The festival is funded by Western New Mexico University, the Town of Silver City, and local businesses and personal donations.

In 2021, the organization introduced successful hybrid presentations and decided to redesign the SWWF website to include a bilingual format, a Bookshelf service for authors, a series of workshops called The Write Stuff, book reviews, articles of local interest, sections for Young Adults and haiku, and a focus on poetry and the local community Silver City in Depth (SCID). This has increased public awareness of the festival among writers and readers. The theme of the 2023 festival was "We Are All Connected."
