= Bano Qudsia =

Pakistani writer (1928–2017)

HI SI Bano Qudsia بانو قدسیہ
- بانو قدسیہ قدسیہ چٹھہ
- Born: Qudsia Chattha; 28 November 1928; Firozpur, Punjab, British India
- Died: 4 February 2017 (aged 88); Lahore, Punjab Pakistan
- Education: Kinnaird College; Government College University (Lahore)
- Occupation: Writer • playwright • intellectual
- Spouse: Ashfaq Ahmed (1925–2004)
- Children: 3
- Writing career
- Subjects: Literature; Philosophy; Sociology; Spiritualism; Psychology
- Notable work: Raja Gidh (1981)
- Notable awards: Sitara-i-Imtiaz (1983), Hilal-i-Imtiaz (2011 ) Kamal-e-Fun Award (2012); Lifetime Achievement Award (2016)
- Website: banoqudsia.org

Bano Qudsia (Urdu: بانو قدسیہ; 28 November 1928 – 4 February 2017), also known as Bano Aapa, was a Pakistani novelist, playwright and spiritualist. She wrote literature in Urdu, producing novels, dramas plays and short stories. Qudsia is best recognized for her novel Raja Gidh. Qudsia also wrote for television and stage in both Urdu and Punjabi languages. Her play Aadhi Baat has been called "a classic play." Bano Qudsia died in Lahore on 4 February 2017.

== Personal life ==
Bano Qudsia was born on 28 November 1928 in Firozpur, British India, as Qudsia Chattha in a Muslim Jat family. Her father was a Bachelor of Agriculture; her mother was also a graduate and inspector of schools in British India and her brother Pervaiz Chattha was a painter. She migrated to Lahore with her family after the partition of India. She graduated from the Kinnaird College in Lahore and then joined the Government College University (Lahore) (GCU) to earn her master's degree in Urdu literature which she completed in 1951.

Qudsia married writer Ashfaq Ahmed whom she had met at the Government College Lahore. They had three sons Aneeq, Anees and Aseer. The couple had been considered inseparable in their social lives.

== Literary work ==
Qudsia's novel Raja Gidh (The King Vulture) is considered a modern Urdu classic. Among her more prominent writings are Aatish-i-zer-i-paa, Aik Din, Asay Pasay, Chahar Chaman, Chhotaa Sheher Baray Log, Footpath ki Ghaas, Haasil Ghaat and Hawwa Kay Naam. The most well known plays she wrote include Tamasil, Hawwa kay Naam, Seharay and Khaleej.

Her critically acclaimed play Aadhi Baat was about a retired headmaster. The play examined the headmaster's day-to-day life problems and had Qavi Khan acting as the lead character. The play's director was Agha Nasir and it was produced by Tauqeer Nasir. Aadhi Baat was performed in May 2010 in Islamabad at a three-day event organized by the Pakistan National Council of the Arts. Ashfaq Ahmed's autobiography Baba Saheba was incomplete at the time of his death in September 2004. Qudsia completed the biography and the second part of it was published as Rah-i-Rawaan. The contrast in the narrative styles of the couple is evident in these two books; while the first half is considered "provoking, lucid and utterly spellbinding" by critics, the second half takes the feeling of sorrow. Qudsia credits Ahmed for transforming her after their marriage and eventually allowing her to devote herself to writing. Qudsia's novel Raah-e-Rawaan راہ ِرواں was published in 2011. It is an analytical look at Ashfaq Ahmed's philosophical thinking and how it may relate to certain aspects of life itself. Qudsia had the highest regard for her husband and placed Ashfaq Ahmed on a very high pedestal. However, she does not even claim to understand the man she lived with for more than five decades. So, an attempt at writing the biography of Ashfaq Ahmed took her beyond that 'one person' — and she started to write about his ancestry, the family including his grandfather, father, uncles, brothers, sisters and their children so as to fully understand the enigma that was Ashfaq Ahmed.

Qudsia's novel Haasil Ghaat was published in 2005 and was noted for its diction but also criticized then for usages of English slangs than her usual traditional Urdu narrative. The language however became popular amongst other writers in future.

Bano Qudsia also wrote a book about Qudrat Ullah Shahab titled "Mard-e-Abresham" مردِابریشم. The book mainly portrays Shahab's life and how it was connected with Ashfaq Ahmed and his family both on social and spiritual level. Baba Mohammad Yahya Khan was much inspired by Maa jee Bano Qudsia and Baba jee Ashfaq Ahmed.

== Death ==
Bano Qudsia died on 4 February 2017 at the Ittefaq Hospital in Lahore at the age of 88. Her son Aseer Ahmed informed that she died around the time for Maghrib prayers (after sunset). She was buried at Lahore on 5 February and prayer services were held at Model Town, Lahore.

== Awards and recognition ==
In 1983, Qudsia was awarded the Sitara-i-Imtiaz (Star of Excellence) by the Government of Pakistan. In 1986 she received PTV Best Writer Award. In 2010, the Pakistani government awarded her the Hilal-i-Imtiaz (Crescent of Excellence) for her services in literature. In 2012, the Pakistan Academy of Letters (PAL) awarded Qudsia the Kamal-e-Fun Award, which is a lifetime achievement award. In 2016, the GCU's Old Ravians Union (GCU-ORU) at its annual reunion conferred on her a lifetime achievement award. The same year, the Pakistan Life Care Foundation (PLCF) also awarded the lifetime achievement award to Qudsia.

On 28 November 2020, Google celebrated her 92nd birth anniversary with a Google Doodle.

== Books ==
Dramas

- Chota Shehar Baray Log ISBN 9-69351-998-1
- Phir Achanak Youn Hua ISBN 9-69351-823-3
- Lagan Apni Apni ISBN 9-69351-533-1
- Aadhee Baat ISBN 9-69351-139-5
- Foot Paath Ki Ghaas ISBN 9-69351-086-0
- Aasay Paasay
- Tamaseel
- Hawa kay Naam
- Dusra Qadam
- Sidhran
- Suraj Mukhi
- Piya Nam ka Diya

Novels

- Raja Gidh ISBN 9-69350-514-X
- Haasil Ghaat ISBN 9-69351-496-3
- Shehr-e-la'zawaal – Abaad Weeranay ISBN 9-69352-441-1
- Purwa
- Moom ki Galiyan
- Shehr-e-Bemisaal
- Tauba Shikan

Short stories

- Hijraton Kay Darmiyan ISBN 9-69352-366-0
- Dast Bastaa ISBN 9-69351-324-X
- Aatish e Zeer Pa
- Amar Bail
- Dusra Darwaza
- Baz Gasht
- Na Qabil e Zikr
- Samaan e Wajood
- Tawaja ki Taalib
- Kuch Aur Nahi

Biographies

- Rah-e-Rawaan ISBN 9-69352-315-6
- Mard-e-Abresham

== See also ==
- List of Urdu-language writers
