= Ashfaq Ahmed =

Pakistani writer (1925–2004)

Ashfaq Ahmed اشفاق احمد SI PP
- Born: 22 August 1925; Muktsar, Punjab, British India
- Died: 7 September 2004 (aged 79); Lahore, Punjab, Pakistan
- Occupations: Writer, playwright, Sufi thinker, intellectual
- Spouse: Bano Qudsia
- Children: Aneeq Ahmed Khan, Anees Ahmed Khan, Aseer Ahmed Khan
- Writing career
- Genres: Fiction, non-fiction, mystical, reformative
- Subjects: Literature, philosophy, psychology, socialism
- Notable works: Talqeen Shah, Aik Muhabbat So Afsaney, Gadariya, Tota Kahani, Mann Chale Ka Sauda, Zavia, Farhang Istalahaat
- Notable awards: Sitara-i-Imtiaz; Pride of Performance (1979)

Ashfaq Ahmed (Urdu: اشفاق احمد; 22 August 1925 – 7 September 2004) was a Pakistani writer, playwright and broadcaster. His works in Urdu included novels, short stories and plays for Pakistan Television and Radio Pakistan. He is the recipient of Presidential Pride of Performance and Sitara-i-Imtiaz (Star of Excellence) awards for his everlasting services in the field of broadcasting and literary heritage of Pakistan.

== Early life and education ==
Ashfaq Ahmed was born on 22 August 1925 in Muktsar, Punjab, British India, in an ethnic Pashtun family of the Mohmand tribe. His early education was in Muktsar.

He completed a Master of Arts degree in Urdu literature from Government College Lahore. His wife, Bano Qudsia, was also a student there. Subsequently, he served as a lecturer at Dayal Singh College in Lahore for two years. He later moved to Rome, where he worked as an Urdu newscaster for Radio Rome and taught Urdu at the University of Rome. During his time in Europe, he earned diplomas in Italian and French from the University of Rome and the University of Grenoble, respectively. He also obtained a specialized diploma in radio broadcasting from New York University.

== Career ==
=== Literature ===
As a boy he wrote stories, which were published in Phool (Flower), a magazine for children. After returning to Pakistan from Europe, he took out his own monthly literary magazine, Dastaango (Story Teller), and joined Radio Pakistan as a script writer. He was made editor of the popular Urdu weekly, Lail-o-Nahar (Day and Night), in place of famous poet Sufi Ghulam Mustafa Tabassum by the Government of Pakistan.

Ahmed wrote over thirty books. His short story (afsana), Gaddarya (The Shepherd) earned him early fame in 1955.

From his own resources, he created the Central Board for the Development of Urdu in Lahore.

=== Radio ===
In 1962, Ashfaq Ahmed started his radio program, Talqeen Shah (The Preacher) which made him popular among the people in towns and villages. He was appointed director of the Markazi Urdu Board in 1966, which was later renamed as Urdu Science Board, a post he held for 29 years. He remained with the board until 1979. He also served as an adviser in the Education Ministry during Zia-ul-Haq's regime.

=== Cinema ===
In 1968, he wrote and directed the Urdu movie Dhoop Aur Sayay (Sun and Shades), which was also the only Urdu production of Hakim Ali Zardari. It was a failure at the box-office, but Ahmed argued that it was because its content was ahead of its time and anticipated the Parallel cinema movement in India.

== Later years, death and legacy ==
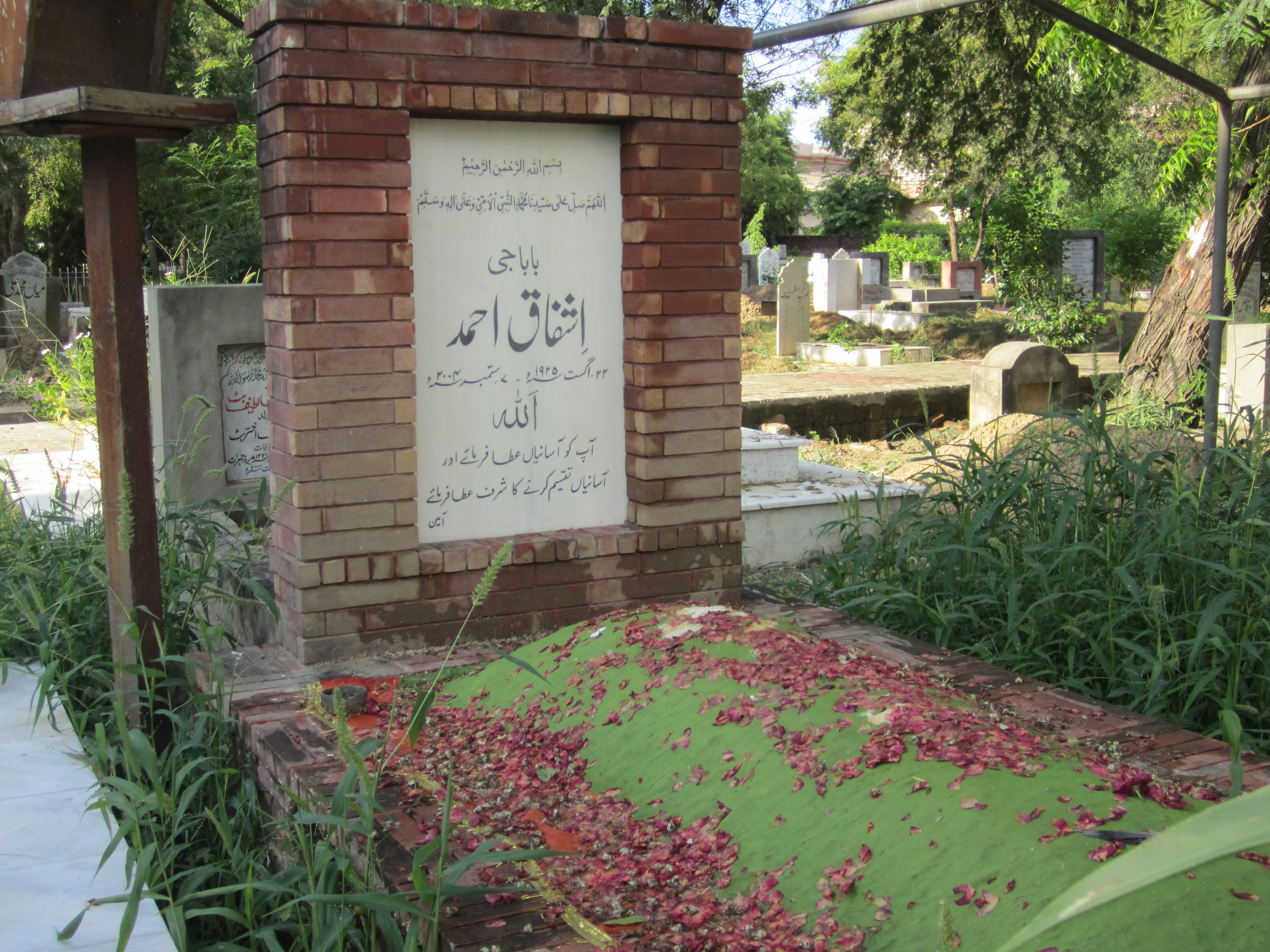
Ashfaq Ahmed's grave in Model Town, Lahore

On 7 September 2004, Ahmed died of pancreatic cancer. He was buried in Model Town, Lahore, Pakistan.

In November 2004, Allama Iqbal Open University staff organized an event in Islamabad to pay tribute to Ahmed. At this eventNational Language Authority Chairman Fateh Muhammad Malik stated that the death of Ashfaq Ahmed had left a vacuum in the literary world of Pakistan. Pakistan Academy of Letters Chairman Iftikhar Arif also paid tribute to him as a dynamic literary figure and said that one of his priorities had always remained welfare of the people.

== Selected media work ==
=== Radio plays ===
- Talqeen Shah (1962)
- Baithak (The Guest Room)

=== Television shows ===
- Uchhay Burj Lahore De / اُچے برج لاہور دے
- Tali Thallay / ٹالی تھلے
- Tota Kahani (1970s) / توتا کہانی
- Aik Mohabbat Sau Afsanay (1975–76) / ایک محبت سو افسانے
- Aur Dramay / اور ڈرامے
- Zavia / زاویہ

== Selected bibliography ==
Ashfaq Ahmed authored numerous works including short stories, novels, plays, essays, and spiritual reflections. Below is a list of his major books:

Year	Urdu title (Romanized)	English title	Description
1961	گڈریا (Gadariya)	The Shepherd	A play about the struggles and innocence of a rural shepherd.
1962	پہلی عورت (Pehli Aurat)	The First Woman	A radio play focusing on women's role in society.
1963	تلخیاں (Talkhiyan)	Bitterness	Collection of early short stories exploring existential themes.
1971	ایک محبت سو افسانے (Ek Mohabbat Sau Afsanay)	One Love, a Hundred Tales	Famous collection of poignant short stories centered on love and human emotions.
1973	کھلیاں (Khaliyan)	The Ears of Corn	A short story collection reflecting rural life and social issues.
1974	طوطا کہانی (Tota Kahani)	The Parrot’s Tale	Allegorical stories with moral and philosophical undertones.
1974	اُچے برج لاہور دے (Uchhay Burj Lahore De)	The Lofty Towers of Lahore	Essays celebrating Lahore’s history and culture.
1975	من چلے کا سودا (Man Chalay Ka Sauda)	Obsession of a Restless Soul	A spiritual and philosophical play exploring Sufi themes.
1977	آدھی بات (Aadhi Baat)	Half the Story	A reflective play with philosophical undertones.
1978	آؤ اردو سیکھیں (Aao Urdu Seekhein)	Come, Let’s Learn Urdu	A practical guide to learning Urdu.
1983	پنچایت (Panchayat)	The Village Council	A play depicting rural justice and social dynamics.
1988	سفر در سفر (Safar Dar Safar)	Journey Within Journeys	A travelogue interwoven with spiritual reflections.
1990s	بند گلی (Band Gali)	The Dead End	Stories illustrating the dilemmas of modern life.
1994	بڑا گاؤں (Bara Gaon)	The Big Village	Essays on society and human relationships.
1997	مہمان سرائے (Mehman Saraye)	The Guesthouse	A collection of radio and TV reflections; metaphorical essays.
2001	بابا صاحبا (Baba Sahiba)	Respected Elder	Philosophical reflections on spiritual and worldly life, in epistolary form.
2001–2004	زاویہ (Zaviya) Vol. 1–3	The Perspective	A compilation of his TV talks and reflections on society, spirituality, and morality.
n.d.	ودیاع جنگ (Vidaa-e-Jang)	Farewell to War	Essays and stories about the futility of war.
n.d.	اور ڈرامے (Aur Dramay)	More Plays	A compilation of plays written for radio and stage.
n.d.	پھولوں کا سفر (Phoolon Ka Safar)	Journey of Flowers	Reflections and allegories on spiritual awakening.
n.d.	صبح ہونے تک (Subah Honay Tak)	Until Morning Comes	Short stories about despair and hope.

== Awards and recognition ==
- Pride of Performance Award (1979)
- Sitara-i-Imtiaz Award by the President of Pakistan

== See also ==
- List of Pakistani writers
- List of Urdu language writers
