= Parveen Shakir =

Pakistani poet (1952–1994)

Parveen Shakir پروین شاکر
- Parveen Shakir
- Born: Parveen Shakir Syed; 24 November 1952; Karachi, Pakistan
- Died: 26 December 1994 (aged 42); Islamabad, Pakistan
- Resting place: H-8 Graveyard, Islamabad; 33°41′19″N 73°3′52″E
- Education: BA, MA, PhD
- Alma mater: Harvard University, University of Karachi
- Occupations: Poet; teacher; civil servant
- Writing career
- Period: 1976–1994
- Genres: Ghazal; free verse; prose
- Subject: Romance
- Notable works: خوشبو, Khushbu (1976)
- Notable awards: Pride of Performance (1990); Adamjee Literary Award (1976)
- Movement: Post-modernism
- Website: perveenshakir.com

Parveen Shakir (Note: Urdu: پروین شاکر; pronounced [ˈpəɾʋiːn ʃɑːkɪɾ]) (24 November 1952 – 26 December 1994) was a Pakistani poet and civil servant of the government of Pakistan. She is best known for her poems, which brought a distinctive feminine voice to Urdu literature.

Since her death in a road accident when she was only 42, the "Parveen Shakir Urdu Literature Festival" has been held every year in Islamabad in her memory.

== Early life and education ==
Shakir was born as Syeda Parveen Bano on 24 November 1952 in Karachi, Pakistan. Her father Shakir Hussain Saqib, also a poet, was from Laheriasarai in the Darbhanga district of Bihar and had migrated to Karachi after the partition of India.

She received two undergraduate degrees, one in English literature and the other in linguistics (from Sir Syed Government Girls College), and obtained MA degrees in the same subjects from the University of Karachi. She also held a PhD, and another MA degree in Bank Administration.

In 1982, Shakir qualified for the Central Superior Services (CSS) Examination. In 1991, she obtained an MA degree in public administration from Harvard University.

== Poetic career ==
Shakir started writing at a very young age. She wrote both prose and poetry, contributed columns in Urdu newspapers, and a few articles in English dailies. Initially, she wrote under the pen-name "Beena".

After teaching for nine years, she joined the Civil Service of Pakistan in October 1982 and worked in the customs department. In 1986, she was appointed second secretary of the Central Board of Revenue (now Federal Board of Revenue) in Islamabad, Pakistan.

In 1976, Shakir published her first volume of poetry Khushbu (Fragrance) to great acclaim. She was awarded one of the highest honours of Pakistan, the Pride of Performance, for her outstanding contributions to literature. She subsequently published other volumes of poetry including Sad-barg (Marsh Marigold) in 1980, and Khud Kalāmi (Soliloquy) and Inkār (Denial) in 1990. These poetry books are collected in Māh-e-Tamām (Full Moon). She also published a collection of her newspaper columns, titled Gosha-e-Chashm (Corner of the Eye). Kaf-e-Āina (The Mirror's Edge) was released posthumously with works from her diaries and journals.

== Death ==
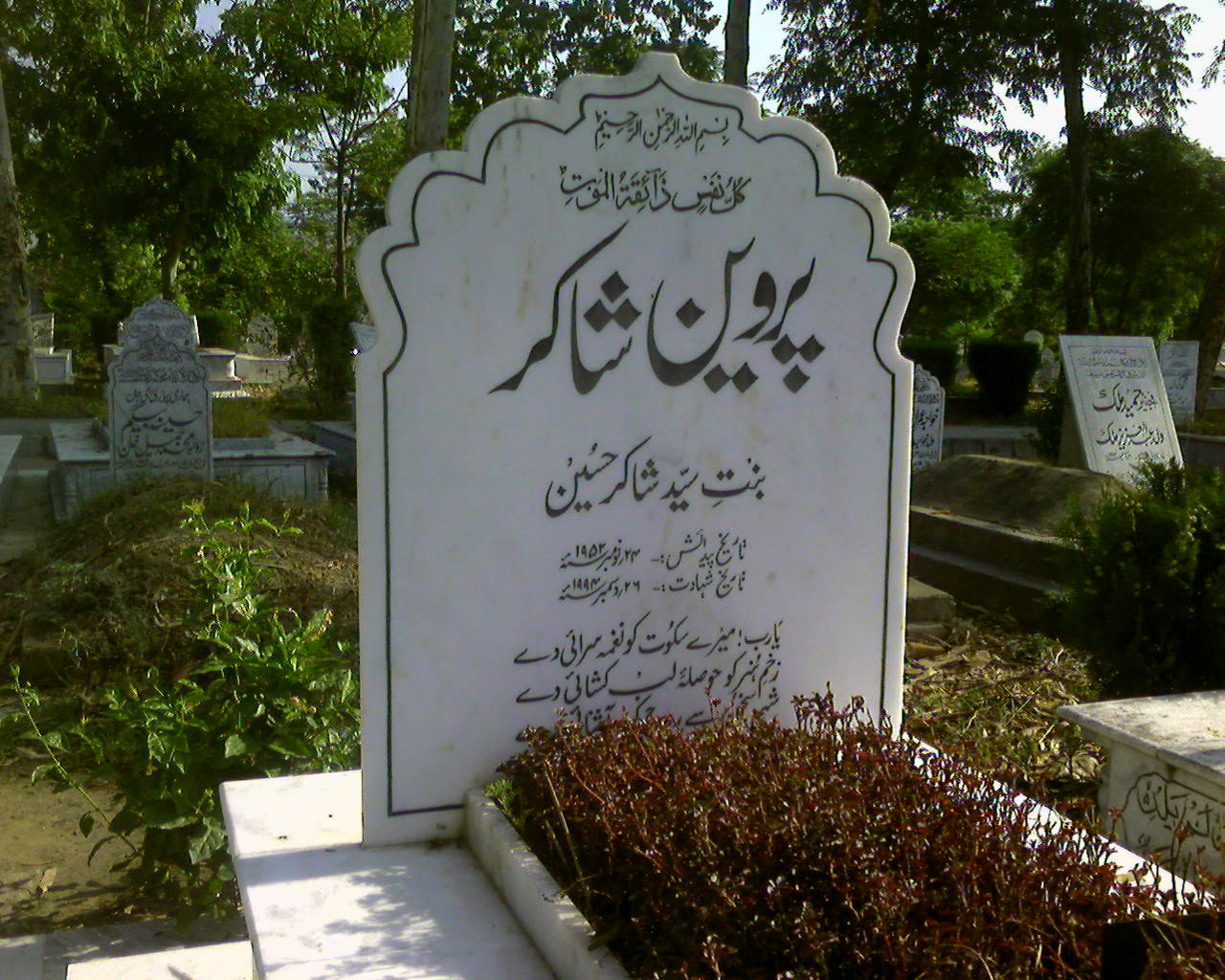
Final resting place of Shakir in Islamabad

On 26 December 1994, Shakir's car collided with a truck while she was on her way to work in Islamabad. The accident resulted in her death.

The road on which the accident took place is named after her as Parveen Shakir Road in sector F-7 Islamabad.

=== Style of poetry ===
The two main styles she wrote in were ghazal and āzād nazm (free verse) where she utilized several literary techniques and examined delicate topics to create a full image of the female experience.

=== Ghazliat ===
Shakir's ghazliāt are considered "a combination of classical tradition with modern sensitivity", and mainly deal with the feminine perspective on love and romance, and associated themes such as beauty, intimacy, separation, break-ups, distances, distrust, infidelity and disloyalty.

Most of Shakir's ghazliāt contain five to ten couplets, often interrelated. Sometimes, two consecutive couplets may differ greatly in meaning and context, an example of this can be noted in the following couplets:

English translation	Urdu
That girl just like her home Fell victim to the flood perhaps I see light when I think of you Remembrance, has become the moon perhaps	اپنے گھر کی طرح وہ لڑکی بھی نذرِ سیلاب ہو گئی شاید تجھ کو سوچوں تو روشنی دیکھوں یاد، مہتاب ہو گئی شاید

The ghazliāt rely heavily on metaphors and similes, which are repeatedly and thought-provokingly used to bring force and lyricism in her works. A fine example of this is seen in one of her most famous couplets:

English translation	Urdu
He is fragrance, and shall diffuse in the winds, The trouble lies with the flower, where shall the flower go	وہ تو خوشبو ہے، ہوائوں میں بکھر جائے گا مسئلہ پھُول کا ہے، پھُول کدھر جائے گا

Here, Shakir relates fragrance to an unfaithful lover, air to the unfaithful person's secret loves, and flower to the person being cheated. Other metaphors Shakir commonly uses are titlī (butterfly) for a Romeo, bādal (cloud) for one's love, bārish (rain) for affection, āṅdhī (storm) for difficulties and chāṅd (moon) for loneliness. An example with the central theme of loneliness using the moon as a metaphor is:

English translation	Urdu
All are passengers All share the fate I, alone here on Earth! He, alone there in the sky!	ایک سے مُسافر ہیں ایک سا مقدّر ہے میں زمین پر تنہا! اور وہ آسمانوں میں!

Some of her ghazliāt have gained iconic status in Urdu literature. Another notable couplet that is often quoted to comment on the often surprising knowledge and awareness of the younger generation is:

English translation	Urdu
They insist upon examining the firefly in daylight The children of our age have become shrewd	جگنو کو دن کے وقت پرکھنے کی ضد کریں بچّے ہمارے عہد کے چالاک ہو گئے

=== Free verse ===
Compared to her ghazliāt, Shakir's free verse is much bolder and explores social issues and taboos, including gender inequality, discrimination, patriotism, deceit, prostitution, the human psyche, and current affairs. It is written in a way which was and is still considered modern in Pakistan.

Other than topics of femininity and female sexuality, Shakir also used free verse to write about topics related to economic disparities and the tendency of society to exploit the weak and poor. Several of her poems lament the harsh reality that many low-income laborers around the world face. For example, her poem "Steel Mills Worker" speaks about the deplorable conditions and long hours workers find themselves doing every day. The poem also describes how these workers are taken for granted and used as a means to an end by those who employ them. The last lines of the poem paint this stark picture vividly.

English translation	Urdu
But perhaps he doesn't know this That upon this contract of suicide He has Consciously put his signature He is actually the fuel of this furnace!	لیکن شاید اس کو یہ نہیں معلوم کہ خودکشی کے اس معاہدے پر اُس نے بقائمی ہوش و حواس دستخط کئے ہیں اس بھٹّی کا ایندھن دَراصل وہ خود ہے!

Another one of her poems, "We Are All Dr Faustus", delves deeper into this subject and directly addresses the prevalence of corruption in wealthy and powerful circles of people. She claimed that the rich achieve their goals but at a grave price, and used these arguments to critique economic systems such as capitalism.

The length of Shakir's free verse poems can range from a few to many lines. Most are written with a central theme while some are written in the mode of stream of consciousness.

Parveen Shakir is known for her use of pop culture references and English words and phrases – a practice that is generally considered inappropriate and is criticised in Urdu poetry. An example is the poem Departmental Store Mein (In a Departmental Store), which is named thus despite the fact that the title could have been substituted with its Urdu equivalent. She also used words like "natural pink", "hand lotion", "shade", "scent" and "pack", and made references to cosmetics brands like Pearl, Revlon, Elizabeth Arden and Tulip in the poem. Other examples are her poems Ecstasy, Nun, Duty, Flower show, and Picnic.

Shakir's free verse also contains a few credited works and poems that are translations of, or inspired by, other authors. Examples are "Wasteland", a poem inspired by Eliot's poem of the same name, "Benasab Wirsay Ka Bojh" (The Burden of Illegitimate Inheritance), a translation of Yeats' "Leda and the Swan", and "Banafshay Ka Phool" (A Violet), inspired by Wordsworth's "A Violet under a hidden rock".

== Poetic themes ==
Shakir's poems are known for their in-depth exploration of sensitive topics rarely talked about, especially for women. Her poems aimed to encompass all parts of being a woman, from the innocence to the start of being conscious of one's own sexuality, and more adult struggles as well. These include the hardships of love, the restrictions and social pressures faced uniquely by women, and the need for women to be more represented in all areas of society. One aspect of writing that Shakir is particularly known for is her introduction of female pronouns, both first person and third person, as a way to normalize femininity in poetry, specifically within the realm of Urdu poetry, a traditionally masculine field.

Through her ghazals in particular, she continued to embody a feminine voice through grammatical choices, giving a voice to females and the female experience. Shakir's personal life was extremely influential in the choice of style and topic that she chose to pursue. An example of this would be the tumultuous divorce between her and her husband, which resulted in her losing custody of her son due to Pakistani law. This event was one of the reasons her writing focused heavily on women's issues in regards to their place in society. Many of her poems lament the discrimination women face, especially as a divorcee living in a more conservative country.

== Legacy ==
Shakir's poetry was well-received, and after her untimely death she is now considered one of the best and "most prominent" modern poets Urdu language has ever produced. Hailed as a "great poetess," her poetry has drawn comparisons to that of Iranian poet Forough Farrokhzad, and she is considered among the breed of writers "regarded as pioneers in defying tradition by expressing the 'female experience' in Urdu poetry."

Her poems were unique in the sense that they exposed and even encouraged freedom of expression among women. She did not shy away from taboo themes; instead, she claimed them and used them to create provocative poems that challenge the dependency of women on men. As influenced by her experience with Pakistani tradition, literary analysts suggest she tried to use her poems to offer a refuge for women fighting misogyny, specifically in South Asian culture.

Her first and most well-known work, Khushbu, was specifically monumental in this regard. In Shakir's writing, she touched on the theme of separation. Shakir's book explored the theme not only in the sense of not only emotionally being alone, but also in regards to unjustly losing social capital as a woman in the absence of a man. Her poems allude to not only what a man provides of her emotionally and physically, but also financially and in terms of societal expectations.

Shakir's work has been acknowledged by several other poets and the media in general. A source states, "Parveen ... seems to have captured the best of Urdu verse ... Owing to [her] style and range of expressions one will be intrigued and ... entertained by some soul-stirring poetry." Another praises "her rhythmic flow and polished wording".

Pakistan's noted literary figure Iftikhar Arif has praised Shakir for impressing "the young lot through her thematic variety and realistic poetry," for adding "a new dimension to the traditional theme of love by giving expression to her emotions in a simple and pellucid style," and using a "variety of words to convey different thoughts with varying intensities."

The Delhi Recorder has stated that Shakir "has given the most beautiful female touch to Urdu poetry."

Shakir's work in writing, teaching, and government service inspired many women to follow suit. After learning about Shakir's pioneering career, many women decided to join work sectors that seldom contained women before, such as journalism and public service.

The first substantial selection of Shakir's work translated into English was made by the poet Paiker-e-Hussain in 2011. In 2019, a collection of 100 selected poems of Shakir were translated into English by Naima Rashid and published by the Oxford University Press under the title "Defiance of the Rose".

=== Parveen Shakir Urdu Literature Festival ===
Due to Shakir's far-reaching impact in the poetry world, the Parveen Shakir Trust was established in 1994. The trust now hosts the Parveen Shakir Urdu Literature Festival in Islamabad every year. During the festival, works from various poets, including Shakir, are displayed in an attempt to create awareness and interest in traditional Pakistani forms of writing and poetry. The festival particularly targets youth in order to increase the amount of younger individuals dedicated to this type of study, although it welcomes those of all ages who attend. According to the organizers of the festival, the event serves as a way to honor past writers, continue the influence of their writing, and promote creativity among the general public.

== Awards and accolades ==
Shakir's first book, Khushboo, was awarded the Adamjee Literary Award in 1976. Later, she was awarded the Pride of Performance, one of Pakistan's highest honours in 1990.

- Presidential Iqbal Award by the President of Pakistan in 1983.

Upon her death, the Parveen Shakir Trust was established by her close friend, Parveen Qadir Agha. The trust organises a yearly function and gives out the "Aks-e-Khushbu" award.

=== Commemorative postage stamp ===
In 2013, Pakistan Post Office issued a commemorative postage stamp of rupees 10 denomination to honor Shakir on the 19th anniversary of her death.

=== Tribute ===
On 24 November 2019, Google celebrated Shakir's 67th birthday with a Google Doodle.

== Books ==
Following is a list of Shakir's published books. Her first book, Khushbu ("fragrance"), was published in 1976.

Year	Title	Urdu title	English translation
1976	Khushbu	خوشبو	"Fragrance"
1980	Sad-barg	صد برگ	"Rosa Centifolia"
1990	Khud-kalaami	خود کلامی	"Soliloquy"
1990	Inkaar	اِنکار	"Denial"
1994	Maah-i-Tamaam	ماہِ تمام	"Full Moon"
1995	Kaf-e-Aa'ina	کفِ آئینہ	"The Mirror's Edge"
2000	Gosha-e-Chashm	گوشہ چشم	"Corner of the eye"

== See also ==
- Ghazal
- Ada Jafri
- Fehmida Riaz
- Kishwar Naheed
- Forough Farrokhzad
