= Begum Akhtar Riazuddin =

Pakistani feminist activist and travelogue writer

Akhtar Riazuddin بیگم اختر ریاض الدین (Urdu) SI
- Born: 15 October 1928; Calcutta, Bengal Presidency, British India (now Kolkata, Kolkata district, India)
- Died: 11 January 2023 (aged 94); Karachi, Pakistan
- Education: MA (English)
- Alma mater: Kinnaird College, Lahore (1949); Government College, Lahore (1951)
- Occupations: Founder and Chairperson, Behbud Association of Pakistan; Travelogue writer (1963–1972); Feminist activist; Lecturer at Islamia College for Women, Lahore (1952–1965); Member of All Pakistan Music Conference Committee (1957–1965); Federal secretary in the Ministry of Women's Development, Pakistan (MWD)
- Spouse: Mian Riazuddin Ahmed (ICS/CSP/DMG officer)
- Children: Three daughters, including Ms. Nigar Ahmad (Chairperson, Aurat Foundation)
- Relatives: Sabihuddin Ahmed (Mr. Riazuddin's nephew); Asma Jahangir (Mr. Riazuddin's niece)
- Awards: Star of Excellence March 2000; Adamjee Adbi Eward – Pakistan Writers’ Guild March 1970 دھنک پر قدم (Note: Climbing the Rainbow: Dhanak par Qadam) – Travelogue
- Website: behbud.org

Begum Akhtar Riazuddin (Note: بیگم اختر ریاض الدین Begam Aḵẖtar Riaẓu l-dīn) SI, MA (English) also spelt Riaz-ud-din or Riaz-ud-deen (15 October 1928 – 11 January 2023) was a Pakistani feminist activist who was also the first modern Urdu-travelogue writer. She received many awards in recognition of her efforts.

== Life and family ==
Akhtar Jahan Begum was born in Calcutta on 15 October 1928. She graduated from Kinnaird College, Lahore, in 1949, and did her MA in English from Government College, Lahore, in 1951. She began her practical life in the profession of teaching. She remained a lecturer at Islamia College for Women, Lahore, from 1952 to 1965. She married Mian Riazuddin Ahmed, (Note: Mian is equivalent to Mr.) and came to be known as Begum Riazuddin. (Note: Begum is equivalent to Mrs.) Their daughter, Nigar Ahmed, is the chairperson of the human rights NGO Aurat Foundation. Riazuddin, a senior civil servant, was the nephew of the Urdu writer, Salahuddin Ahmed. Justice Sabihuddin Ahmed and Asma Jahangir are related to Akhtar Riazuddin through her husband.

Begum Akhtar Riazuddin died in Karachi on 11 January 2023, at the age of 94.

== Literary career ==
Begum Riazuddin's literary career is based on two travelogues, ‘Dhanak Par Qadam’ (1969) and ‘Sat Samundar Par’ (1963). In her travelogues, she uses unique similes and humorous allusions, along with satirical comments. She writes in an informal style, which is simple and interesting. Her travelogues feature human mentality, along with civilisation and society.

== Feminist activism ==
Riazuddin was an activist, focusing on women's uplift. She founded her welfare organisation, Behbud Association of Pakistan, for the purpose, in 1967 other branches later expanded to Lahore and in Karachi by the name of Behbud Association Karachi. . She worked as federal secretary of the Ministry of Women's Development in the late 1980s. She has attended many international conferences for the betterment and welfare of women, including the 32nd Session of the UN Commission on the Status of Women held in Vienna in March 1988.

When Benazir Bhutto became the prime minister in 1988, Riazuddin was optimistic and hoped for a better future for women after the harsh Zia regime. She said:

Women in Pakistan are really beginning to hope that things will improve for them. Even in the most conservative corners, women know they no longer face what they have been through in the past 11 years.

== Other occupations ==
Other than being a teacher, she remained a member of the All Pakistan Music Conference Committee from 1957 to 1965. She also participated in the First All Pakistan Handicrafts Exhibition in Lahore in 1965. Begum Riazuddin also acted as adviser to the National Craft Council during mid-1980s. She is one of the founding members of Behbud Association, a social welfare organization working towards empowering women in underprivileged areas. She is a member of the board of governors of the Bait-ul-Mal, to which she was nominated by the Prime Minister of Pakistan.

== Books ==
Her book Pakistan was published by Stacey International, London, in 1975. Another book A History of Crafts in India and Pakistan was launched in Pakistan in 1990 and the next year in London. She has also worked on a thesis titled The Contribution of Islamic Civilisation to India & Pakistan. Her works also include her travelogues, Sat Samundar Par (Note: Across the Seven Seas سات سمندر پار) and Dhanak Par Qadam (1969).

== Awards ==
Riazuddin was conferred the Sitara-e-Imtiaz by the president of Pakistan in March 2000 for her voluntary social service. She received the 'Lifetime Achievement Award' of the Ministry of Women's Development in August 2005. She was given the Adamjee Literary Award by the Pakistan Writers' Guild for her pioneering work in the genre of travelogue in Urdu 'Dhanak Par Qadam' in March 1970. She was also one of the group of 1,000 women nominated for the Nobel Peace Prize in 2005 as part of the 1000 PeaceWomen project.

== See also ==
- Asma Jahangir
- Malala Yousafzai
- Qurratulain Hyder
- Urdu literature
