= Khushbu (poetry) =

Khushbu (Urdu: خوشبو) is a volume of poetry written by Pakistani Urdu poet Parveen Shakir, and published in 1976.

== Poetry ==
The poetry in Khushbu, like most of Shakir's subsequent work, can be divided into two categories: the ghazal [plural: ghazalyaat], and free verse.

== Ghazal ==
=== Style ===
Most of Shakir's ghazalyaat contain five to ten couplets, often - though not always - inter-related. Sometimes, two consecutive couplets may differ greatly in meaning and context [For example, in one of her works, the couplet 'That girl, like her home, perhaps/ Fell victim to the flood' is immediately followed by 'I see light when I think of you/ Perhaps remembrance has become the moon'].

The ghazalyaat in Khusbhu heavily rely on metaphors and similes, which are repeatedly and thought-provokingly used to bring force, thoughtfulness and lyricism in her work. An example is the couplet, "Wo tou khushbu hai, hawaon main bikhar jaye ga/ Masla phool ka hai, phool kidher jayega?" [Translation: He is fragrance, he will scatter in the air/ the trouble lies with the flower - where shall the flower go?] where Shakir relates 'fragrance' to an unfaithful lover, 'air' to the unfaithful's secret loves, and 'flower' to the person cheated. Other metaphors Shakir commonly used in the book are mausum [weather] for times, ghulab [rose] for the female lover, titli [butterfly] for a Romeo, hava [wind] for a wayward love, darya [river] for affection, baarish [rain] for affection, and aandhi [storm] for difficulties.

=== Themes ===
The ghazalyaat in Khusbu mainly deal with the feminine perspective on love and romance, and associated themes such as beauty, intimacy, separation, break-ups, distances, distrust and infidelity and disloyalty.

==== Shakir in her ghazal ====
The ghazalyaat in Shakir's books are one of the biggest, undisputed sources to her personality, and those in Khushbu establish her as an emotional, romantic, fiery and, above all, strong woman. In one couplet, Shakir's describes her fiery nature, and determination to acquire what she loves, thus:

"My heart is fiery, and to reach thee/
It shall render my body a canoe, and my blood a river."

She also expresses her stead-fastness in love ["Is there anyone like me, who/ will dedicate their life to thy remembrance?" and "Where have I not gone in search of peace of heart/ But this heart - Forever it has been in his company!"], her determination to learn from bitter experience, and to move on in life [I moved on, for thy infidelity/ Revealed to me this distrustful world], and the fact that she does not wear her emotions on her sleeve [It has shattered, but greets with smile/ I am in control of my attitude]. The ghazalyaat in Khushbu bring forth Shakir's thirst for trying new things [I must leave the road/ The path to my house is not paved], her staunch preference of truth over lies ["Your truths were bitter, but I like them" and "I will speak the truth at all costs, I was not aware/ You did not know of this evil of mine!] and her habit to experience every emotion intensely [I have been well-known to the nature of storms].

==== Separation ====
Separation is a much-emphasized topic in Khushbu, and is dealt with in many ways. It may be willing or unwilling separation - in the form of break-ups, long distance relationships, dying love or memories of an old romance - and is emphasized in works such as Neend tou khwaab hai aur hijr ki shub khwaab kahan? [Sleep is a dream - and the night of separation is not a dream!], Dost [Friend], Shadeed dukh tha agarcha teri judaai ka [Though the pain of your separation was great!] and Chiraagh-e-raah bujha kya, kay rehnuma bhi gaya [The guide left as soon as the lamp died out].

Shakir's work Let Him Come to Sprout a Flower in my Heart heavily focuses on these themes. A few couplets are cited here:

"Let him come to sprout a flower in my heart,

Let him come to wound my heart anew!

Let fragrance awaken in my empty doors,
Let him come to decorate my house.

Around here, live many people he knows,

Can not he come under pretense of meeting someone else?"

In The Night Dances Like my Body, Shakir says:

"I will live my life, away from you,
Like an exile."

Similarly, separation that is unwilling on both sides is implied by the following couplets in her ghazal My face - his eyes!

"Often, I wake up from my sleep, thinking,

How does he bear the night [sans me]?

Despite all these distances, his arms,

[Seem to] encircle me, forever."

Some other couplets of Shakir, focusing on the theme of separation:

"He walks with me, like the moon,
Who says I am alone in nights of separation?"

"Meeting - promise to meet again - separation,
So much happened so suddenly!"

"I am living after [separating from] you,
And you - you, too, are living your life."

==== Other ====
The recurring theme of elusive love is often explored in ghazals such as "Wo tou khushbu hai" (He is fragrance), where the poet describes the essence of love as fleeting and intangible, like a scent. For example, in "Khushbu bhi us k tarz-e-pazeerai per gai" (Fragrance also goes by his style of welcome), the poet suggests that even fragrance is transient and influenced by the beloved's presence. Similarly, "Gongay laboun pe hurf-e-tamanna kiya mujhe" (I am a wish on mute lips) metaphorically portrays unspoken desires.

Shakir's poetry often speaks of pain, its pain and its joy. It also often mentions loss and loneliness, grief, shattered dreams, life after a break-up and the healing power of love.

== See also ==
- Parveen Shakir
- Fehmida Riaz
- Kishwar Naheed
