= Khushbu (disambiguation) =

Khushbu Sundar is an Indian politician, actress and producer.

Khushbu may also refer to:

- Khushbu (poetry), a 1976 volume of poetry
- Khushbu (Sepak takraw) (born 1995), Indian sepak takraw player
- Khushbu Thakkar, Indian actress

== See also ==
- Khushboo (disambiguation)
