= Abdullah Hussein =

Abdullah Hussein or Hussain may refer to:

- Abdullah II of Jordan (born 1962), King of Jordan
- Abdullah Hussain (1920–2014), Malaysian novelist and writer
- Abdullah Hussain (writer, born 1931) (1931–2015), Pakistani novelist
