= Muhammad Izhar ul Haq =

Pakistani poet and columnist (born 1948)

- Born: 14 February 1948 (age 78); Attock, Punjab, Pakistan
- Occupations: Urdu poet, columnist, Civil servant
- Writing career
- Notable works: Diwaar-e-aab, Pani peh Bichha Takht, Talkh Nawai
- Notable awards: Adam Jee award, Dr. Allama Muhammad Iqbal award, Pride of Performance
- Website: www.izharulhaq.net

Muhammad Izhar ul Haq (born 14 February 1948) is a Pakistani poet and columnist. He has published five books of Urdu poetry and writes a column in 92 News, under the title "Talkh Nawai" (تلخ نوائ).

== Poetry ==
Muhammad Izhar ul Haq has published six books of Urdu poetry:

- Diwaar-e-aab (winner of Adamjee Literary Award 1982)
- Ghadr (1986)
- Paree-zaad (1995)
- Paani peh Bichha Takht (winner of Allama Iqbal Award 2003)
- Kai Mausam Guzar Gaye Mujh Par (collection of earlier four books) (2012)
- Ay Aasman Neeche Utar (2023)

English translation of Izhar ul Haq's poetry can be read in the anthology "Pakistani Urdu Verse, Oxford University Press 2010", translated and edited by Yasmeen Hameed.

== Autobiography ==
In 2025, Izhar ul Haq published the first volume of his autobiography, Bikhri Hai Meri Daastaan, which includes recollections of his student years in East Pakistan and descriptions of his early village life. A review by Dr Ejaz Hussain described the book as culturally and historically significant, framing it as a reflection on a generation shaped by experiences across East and West Pakistan.

== Columns and other literary works ==
He has been a columnist in Jang, Daily Jinnah, Nawaiwaqt, Daily Dunya, and presently in Daily 92 News. The title of his Urdu column is "Talkh Nawai", which translates to "bitter discourse". Veteran Urdu columnist Rauf Klasra in his preface to "Talkh Nawai" notes that Izhar ul Haq's command and mastery over classical literature is equally impressive whether it is Urdu, English, or Persian, and he has the ability to effectively use his literary prowess in his columns.

Izhar ul Haq has also contributed in the research for implementation of Urdu in Pakistan, with the National Language Authority, and also contributed as one of the compilers of the Qaumi English-Urdu Dictionary, published by the National Language Authority. In addition, he contributed with Pakistan Academy of Letters in compiling yearly selection of Pakistani literature.

For his services to Urdu literature and poetry, Muhammad Izhar ul Haq was awarded Pride of Performance by the government of Pakistan in 2008. The Capital Development Authority of Islamabad titled its library "Gosha-e-Izhar" in 2017 after Muhammad Izhar ul Haq's literary contribution.

== Critique ==
Intizar Hussain commented that "Izharul Haq is equally well-versed in the ghazal as well as in free verse. In both forms, he has been able to devise a diction, which distinguishes his verse from those of his contemporaries."

== See also ==
- Zafar Iqbal
- Jon Elia
- Anwar Masood
- Yasmeen Hameed
