= Umrao Tariq =

Umrao Tariq at Anjuman Taraqqi-i-Urdu, 2005

Umrao Tariq (born Syed Tariq Ali: 1932 in Fatehpur, Haswa, British India – 8 December 2011) was an acclaimed Urdu writer based in Karachi, Pakistan. He normally wrote short stories (Afsanay), but wrote a novel and other works of prose as well.

== Biography ==
Umrao Tariq was born in 1932 in a landed family in Fatehpur, near Kanpur but spent most of his childhood in Shahpur. After the independence of India and Pakistan, Umrao Tariq moved to Hyderabad Deccan, then an independent state surrounded by India. After Hyderabad was attacked by the Indian Army and annexed by India in 1948, Umrao Tariq moved to Dhaka/Dacca (presently in Bangladesh). It was in Dhaka that Umrao Tariq started writing Urdu screenplays for theater. In 1952 Umrao Tariq moved to Karachi and came under the tutelage of Baba-e-Urdu Maulvi Abdul-Haq and noted critic Farman Fatehpuri (ex-Chairman of Urdu Department of the University of Karachi). Umrao Tariq worked for the Sindh Police and retired in 1992, after reaching the post of Deputy Inspector General (DIG) in the Sindh Police. After his retirement from the Sindh Police Umrao Tariq practiced law for a short time. He also worked as Deputy Secretary of Anjuman Taraqqi-e-Urdu (founded by Maulvi Abdul Haq) in Karachi. Umrao Tariq died of hematologic cancer on 8 December 2011—he left behind a wife and six children.

== Writing career ==
Umrao Tariq started writing at an early age, but first got published in 1954. His first collection of short stories published in 1979 under the title of Badan ka Tawaf won the Adamjee Literary Award. Following are his publications:
Badan ka Tawaf (collection of short stories)
Khushkee peh jazeeray (collection of short stories)
] Tamam Sheher nay pehnay hoay haiN dastanay (collection of short stories)
Ma'toob (novel)
Dhanak kay baqee manda rang (sketches and impressions of contemporary Urdu writers)
TaroN peh likhay nam (sketches and impressions of contemporary Urdu writers)
Farman Fatehpuri, hayat wa khidmat (a three volume anthology of contemporary Urdu writers' essays on Farman Fatehpur's work, compiled by Umrao Tariq)

An M.Phil. thesis on Umrao Tariq, titled Umrao Tariq, shakhsiyat wa funn wa was published in 1997.
