= Adamjee Literary Award =

Pakistan's literary prize

Adamjee Literary Award, also known as Adamjee Prize, is a literary award bestowed by the government of Pakistan. It is presented by the President of Pakistan. The award seeks to recognize individuals who have made "meritorious contribution" to the literature of Pakistan. It was first introduced by Pakistan Writers' Guild in 1959. Muhammad Shahidullah served as the permanent chairman of the award.

== List of winners ==
Year	Winners	Ref(s)
1959	Ghulam Abbas and Shaukat Siddiqui (Urdu); Syed Abdul Sattar and Roshan Yazdani (Bengali)	
1960	Jamila Hashmi and Jamiluddin Aali	
1961	Afzal Ahsan Randhawa (Deeva Tey Darya)	
1962	Shamsur Rahman and Shahidullah Kaiser	
1963	Abdullah Hussain (Udaas Naslein), Mahbubul Alam, Khadija Mastoor (Aangan)	
1964	Ahsan Habib, Zahir Raihan	
1965	Sufi Motahar Hossein	
1966	Shawkat Osman, Abul Fazal and Farrukh Ahmad	
1967	Khalid Akhtar, Ada Jafri and Abdul Quadir and Hasan Hafizur Rahman	
1968	Mirza Adeeb, Kishwar Naheed and Sardar Jainuddin	
1969	Syed Shamsul Haque and Rashid Karim	
1970	Begum Akhtar Riazuddin (Dhanak Par Qadam)	
1978	Parveen Shakir	
1979	Umrao Tariq	
1980	Hasan Akbar Kamal	
1982	Muhammad Izhar ul Haq (Deewar-e-Aab)	
	Intizar Hussain	
	Hasan Azizul Huq	
	Abu Rushd	
	Qateel Shifai	
	Rahim Gul (Dastan Chor Aye)	
	Munshi Raisuddin	
—N/a	Jilani Kamran	
