= Mirza Adeeb =

Pakistani playwright and dramatist (1914–1999)

- میرزا ادیب
- A portrait of Mirza Adeeb
- Born: Mirza Dilawer; 4 April 1914; Lahore, Punjab, British India (now Punjab, Pakistan)
- Died: 31 July 1999 (aged 85); Lahore, Punjab, Pakistan
- Citizenship: Pakistani
- Education: Islamia College, Railway Road, Lahore; Government Islamia High School, Bhati Gate, Lahore
- Occupations: Dramatist or Playwright, Short story writer
- Writing career
- Pen name: Meerza Adeeb
- Language: Punjabi, Urdu
- Period: Modern Era (Post-World War II)
- Genres: Drama, short story
- Subjects: Verisimilitude, Realism and Romanticism
- Notable works: Pas-i Pardah (1967), Caccā Coṉc
- Notable awards: Pride of Performance 1981; Adamjee Literary Award – Pakistan Writers' Guild 31 January 1968 Pas-i Pardah – Drama; United Book Prize – Pakistan Writers' Guild 2 November 1976 Caccā Coṉc – Short story
- Movements: Progressive Movement; Romanticist Movement

Mirza Adeeb :PP, BA (Hon), (Punjab, Urdu: مرزا ادیب—Mirzā Adīb; 4 April 1914 – 31 July 1999), also known as Meerza Adeeb, (میرزا ادیب—Mīrzā Adīb), was a Pakistani dramatist, playwright and short story writer who wrote in Urdu and Punjabi languages. His plays and short stories won him six prizes and awards from the Pakistan Writers' Guild.

== Name ==
Mirza Adeeb's birth name was Mirza Dilawer Ali, but he came to be known in the literary world as Mirza Adeeb. (Mirza denotes the rank of a high nobleman or Prince, (Note: The derivation of which word is from Emir – Amīr (Urdu for 'nobleman') and Zādah (Urdu for 'son').) and Adeeb means 'litterateur').

== Early life ==
He was born on 4 April 1914, in Lahore, British India to Mirza Basheer Ali. He attended Government Islamia High School, Bhati Gate, Lahore. He got his Bachelor of Arts degree from Islamia College, Lahore. He initially focused on poetry, then devoted himself to playwriting.

== Career ==
=== Plays ===
At first, being influenced by the Rūmānwī Tẹḥrīk—رومانوی تحریک (Urdu for 'The Romanticist Movement'), he wrote romantic prose.

Later, he switched to writing plays about everyday events and incidents taking place in society, focusing more on social problems and common public issues. His later works were pragmatist and verisimilitudinous. He used simple and everyday language in his plays, which enabled them to get a greater audience. Moreover, he had begun writing one-act dramas, which made them easier to broadcast over radio and television. When he affiliated himself with Radio Pakistan, many of his plays were broadcast and gained popularity among the masses. He is listed as a prominent Urdu playwright of the Modern Era.

=== Other works ===
His main works, other than dramas, include stories and biographies. He also wrote critical essays and commentaries on books, besides writing columns in newspapers. He was also influenced by the Taraqqī-Pasasnd Tẹḥrīk—ترقّی-پسند تحریک (Urdu for 'Progressive Movement'). He was also the editor of magazines, of which the most notable is Adab-e Laṭīf—ادبِ لطیف (Urdu for 'Humorous Literature'). He also translated some American stories to Urdu.

== Style ==
Following are the main features of Mirza Adeeb's style of writing:

- Objectivity: His plays had a strong sense of objectivity in them.
- Riveting dialogues: The dialogues he chose were grounded, yet captivating. Each character spoke according to his/her social status and his dramas did not contain artificial, literary dialogues. His dialogues also contained witty repartees and striking replies.
- Versatility: His story lines include a variety of topics, taken from the prosaic lives on common people.
- Pragmatism: Rather than focusing on characterisation, as did many of his contemporaries, he focused more on events.
- Humanitarianism: His plays and stories have a humanitarian and philanthropic outlook.

== Works ==
- His selective drama-collections are:
- Āⁿsū aur Sitārē, آنسو اور ستارے (Urdu for 'Tears and the Stars')
- Lahū aur Qālīn, لہو اور قالین (Urdu for 'the Blood and the Carpet')
- Šīšē kī Dīwār, شیشے کی دیوار (Urdu for 'the Wall of Glass')
- Sutūn, ستون (Urdu for 'the Pillar')
- Faṣīl-e Šab, فصیلِ شب (Urdu for 'Part of the Night')
- m'Pas-e Pardah, پسِ پرده (Urdu for 'Beneath the Veil') (1967)
- Xāk Našīn, خاک نشین (Urdu for 'the Earth Dwellers') and
- Šīšah Mērē Saŋg, شیشہ میرے سنگ (Urdu for 'the Glass With Me')
- His selective short-story collections are:
- Jaŋgal, جنگل (Urdu for 'the Jungle')
- Dustak, دستک (Urdu for 'Knocking')
- Dīwārēⁿ, دیواریں (Urdu for 'the Walls')
- Kambal, کمبل (Urdu for 'the Blanket')
- Sharfoo Ki Kahani, شروف کی کہانی (Urdu for 'The Story of Nobel people')
- Wo Larki Kon Thi, وہ لڑکی کون تھی (Urdu for 'Who was that girl')
- His collection of personal biographies is:
- Nāxun kā Qarź, ناخن کا قرض (Urdu for 'the Debt of the Fingernail')
- Miṫṫī kā Diyā, مٹّی کا دیا (Urdu for 'the Earthen Lamp') is his autobiography.

== Awards ==
- Presidential Award for playwriting, 1969
- Pride of Performance Award for literature in 1981
- His play, Pas-e Pardah (1967), won him the Ādamjī Adabī Ēwārḋ (آدم جی ادبی ایوارڈ—Adamjee Literary Award) in 1968

== Death ==
Mirza Adeeb died on 31 July 1999 in Lahore, Pakistan at age 85.

== See also ==
- Urdu literature
- Short story
- Literature
- Postmodern literature
- List of authors
- List of playwrights
- List of Pakistani writers
- List of short-story authors
