= Khalida Ghous =

Pakistani academic

- Born: Karachi, Pakistan
- Known for: Human rights, gender issues

Academic background
- Education: University of Karachi
- Doctoral advisor: Khalid M. Ishaq

Academic work
- Discipline: Human rights and international relations
- Institutions: University of Karachi, Social Policy and Development Center

Khalida Ghous (Urdu: خالدہ غوث) is a Pakistani scholar of international relations and human rights.

She is a former managing director of the Social Policy and Development Center, a research institute based in Karachi, Pakistan.

== Education ==
Ghous attended the University of Karachi and earned both an MA and PhD in international relations. She completed her PhD under the supervision of the jurist Khalid M. Ishaq on the institutionalization of human rights, with particular reference to the European Court of Human Rights.

== Career ==
Ghous served as chairperson of the Department of International Relations at the University of Karachi from September 2003 to September 2006. She has held several academic leadership roles at the University of Karachi, including directorships in women's studies and liberal arts programs, and has also contributed to policy discussions on gender-related issues at the federal and provincial levels. She participated in professional and government committees related to women's empowerment and has taught courses at the Institute of Business Administration, Karachi.

In 2006, Ghous was one of eighteen people who sent an open letter to President Pervez Musharraf, calling on him to resign as either president or Chief of Army Staff.

She was involved in the United Nations Commission on Human Rights and was invited by the European Union to deliver a talk in Brussels. Ghous has participated in Pakistan–India back-channel diplomacy as a member of the India–Pakistan Neemrana initiative.

== Honors and fellowships ==
Ghous has received several academic fellowships and participated in international programs related to human rights and conflict resolution, including initiatives supported by the World University Service and the Henry L. Stimson Center.

== Books ==
- Ghous, Khalida (2005). Trafficking of Women and Children in South Asia and Within Pakistan. New York: Lawyers for Human Rights and Legal Aid (LHRLA).
- Ghous, Khalida (2002). Female Home-Based Workers: The Silent Workforce. Karachi: Centre of Excellence for Women's Studies, University of Karachi.
- Ahmed, M., and Ghous, K. (eds.) (1999). Pakistan: Prospects and Perspectives. Karachi: Royal Book Company.

== Sources and external links ==
- Social Policy and Development Center
- Henry L. Stimson Center
- An interview with the Financial Post
- Important role in Indo-Pak track II diplomacy
- Voice of America takes her comments
- The Pioneer editorial
- President of Pakistan's website
- Dawn Pakistan's largest English daily praises Dr. Khalida in an Editorial
- International Conference
- Activism
