= Khalid Ishaq =

Pakistani jurist and legal scholar (1926–2004)

Khalid Muhammad Ishaq
- خالد محمد اسحاق
- Born: 16 August 1926; Shikarpur, Sindh
- Died: 7 February 2004 (aged 77); Karachi, Pakistan
- Education: D. J. Science College; Bombay University; Shahani Law College
- Occupations: Advocate, jurist, legal scholar

Khalid Muhammad Ishaq (Sindhi: خالد محمد اسحاق; 16 August 1926 – 7 February 2004) was a Pakistani jurist and scholar of law, Islamic studies and literature. He served as Additional Advocate General of West Pakistan from 1958 and as Advocate General from 1963, resigning the following year to establish his own practice. He was elected president of the Sindh High Court Bar Association in 1965 and practised as a senior advocate before the Supreme Court of Pakistan. He was also a member of the Council of Islamic Ideology of Pakistan and donated an extensive personal library to the Lahore University of Management Sciences (LUMS), where it is housed in the Khalid Ishaq Wing.

== Early life and education ==
Ishaq was born on 16 August 1926 in Shikarpur, Sindh, to Mohammed Ishaq and Begum Talat Farrukh Ahmed Ishaq. His maternal grandfather, Maulvi Ziauddin Ahmed, served as a Deputy Inspector General in the Bombay Sind Presidency.

Ishaq graduated with a degree in Arabic from D. J. Science College in 1945. He subsequently earned an MA from Bombay University and an LLB at Shahani Law College.

== Legal career ==
Ishaq began legal practice in 1948. He later recounted that he had initially intended to join the civil service but turned to law after being passed over for a senior position in the civil service examination on what he described as ethnic grounds. In 1958, at the age of 32, he was appointed Additional Advocate General of West Pakistan. He was promoted to Advocate General in 1963 and resigned the following year to establish his law practice, concentrating on civil law before the High Court of Sindh and the Supreme Court of Pakistan. He was elected president of the Sindh High Court Bar Association (SHCBA) in 1965, at the age of 39. He was known for taking on cases without charge for clients who could not afford representation. He was a member of the Thinkers Forum and was an advocate for the equal rights of religious minorities, including their eligibility for judicial appointments.

== Scholarship ==
Ishaq focused primarily on Persian and Arabic studies. In 1965, he became project director of the Islamic Research Institute. He served as a member of the Council of Islamic Ideology of Pakistan until 1980. From 1976 to 1977, he taught Seerah at Sindh University as a professor.

Ishaq maintained an extensive personal collection of Quranic commentaries and related works. At the time of his death, the collection comprised more than 200,000 volumes. It had been his personal wish to keep the collection in Karachi. The books were subsequently donated to Lahore University of Management Sciences (LUMS) in 2005. LUMS has designated the first floor of its library as the Khalid Ishaq Wing in recognition of the donation.

For approximately 40 years, Ishaq hosted a weekly gathering at his home in the Garden East neighbourhood of Karachi. The meetings served as an intellectual forum and attracted lawyers, academics, journalists and others; participants were free to debate openly on most subjects, though criticism of Islam, the Prophet, the ideology of Pakistan or the Quaid-i-Azam was not permitted.

== Associates and students ==
Several legal practitioners associated with Ishaq were subsequently elevated to the superior judiciary, including Justice Abdul Qadir Sheikh, Justice Amir Raza, Justice Nasir Aslam Zahid, Justice Majida Rizvi, Justice Nizam Ahmed, Justice Sabihuddin Ahmed, Justice Ghulam Nabi Soomro, Justice Mujeebullah Siddiqui, Justice Amir Hani Muslim and Justice Mushtaq Memon. Justice Sabihuddin Ahmed, who later served as Chief Justice of the Sindh High Court, credited Ishaq with drawing him into the legal profession and described a 50-year association with him.

Among those who have cited Ishaq as a mentor are Abdul Hafeez Lakho, Muneer Malik, Shehenshah Hussain, Ahsan Zaheer Rizvi, Khalid Ibrahim, Abdul G. Soomro, Abid Zuberi and his son Sohaib Khalid Ishaq. Khalida Ghous completed her doctoral thesis under his supervision.

== Death and condolences ==
Ishaq died on 7 February 2004 at his home in Garden East, Karachi. His sons Yahya Nadeem and Shoaib survived him. The Sindh Bar Council and Supreme Court Bar Association issued a joint condolence statement, describing him as "a treasure of knowledge including jurisprudence". The acting governor of Sindh, Syed Muzaffar Hussain Shah, visited the family home to offer condolences, accompanied by Sindh Law Minister Choudhry Iftikhar Hussain.

== Publications ==
- Constitutional Limitations: An Essay on Limits on Exercise of Political Power. Pakistan Publishing House, 1972. 85 pp.
- Islamic Principles of Economic Management. Economist Research Unit, 1982. 57 pp.
- Islamization of Laws: The Pakistan Experience. 1986.
- The Problem: Building Interest-Free Economy. 1988. 69 pp.
