= Hasan Akbar Kamal =

Pakistani poet and writer

- Born: 14 February 1946; Agra, British India
- Died: 21 July 2017 (aged 71); Karachi, Pakistan
- Occupation: Poet

Hasan Akbar Kamal (1946 – 2017) was a notable Pakistani poet and writer of children's novels. He was awarded the Adamjee Literary Award in 1980. He was a professor of English and was influenced by poetry of the Romantics.

== Books ==
He wrote the following notable books:

- Sukhan
- Khizan mera mausam
- Kamal kay mazameen
- Iltija
