= Jilani Kamran =

Pakistani poet, critic

- جیلانی كامران
- Jilani Kamran
- Born: Ghulam Jilani; 24 August 1926; Poonch, Jammu and Kashmir princely state, British India
- Died: 22 February 2003 (aged 76); Lahore, Pakistan
- Resting place: Nishtar Block cemetery, Lahore
- Education: English; MA; English; MA (Hons)
- Alma mater: University of Punjab; University of Edinburgh
- Occupations: Poet; Critic; Teacher
- Writing career
- Pen name: Jilani Kamran
- Language: Urdu, English
- Years active: 1958 – 2003
- Genres: Gazal, Nazm
- Notable awards: Full list

Professor Jilani Kamran (born Ghulam Jilani; 24 August 1926 – 22 February 2003), also spelled Gilani Kamran, was a Pakistani poet, critic, teacher, and the head of English Department at Forman Christian College, Lahore. He wrote some 35 books, comprising poems and some uncertain genres; he is also credited with translating the publications of 19th-century Sufi poet Khwaja Ghulam Farid into English.

== Early life and education ==
He was born as Ghulam Jilani in Poonch district of Jammu and Kashmir princely state, British India. He did his master's in English from the University of Punjab and Master of Arts (Hons) from the University of Edinburgh.

== Academic career ==
Jilani served in various education departments since his first appointment in 1958 at the Government College University, Lahore. He initially served as a teacher until 1973. He was later transferred to the Government College Asghar Mall Rawalpindi and served as principal from 1973 until he was transferred in 1975 to the Government Shalimar College at Baghbanpura where he served until 1979. Later in 1979, he was appointed as head of the Forman Christian College (formerly F. C. College) for English department until he retired in 1986.

== Literary career ==
Jilani started his career around 1958 when he was appointed as a teacher. He primarily wrote Sufi devotional poems, and was influenced by the contemporary European literature. His some authorship include Nai Nazm kay Taqazay, Ibn-e-Arabi, and Mansur Hallaj among other publications, including some books on mysticism. He wrote in both Urdu and English languages, and is often recognized for introducing new genres of nazms to Urdu poetry with the help of romantic and Arabic poetry.

== Death and legacy ==
Jilani was suffering from hypertension medical condition, and was subsequently admitted to a hospital. He died of brain haemorrhage on 23 February 2003 in Lahore, Pakistan, and is buried in Nishtar Block cemetery, Lahore. Among the survivors are his wife, three sons and a daughter.

Jilani Kamran was considered an authority on English and Urdu literature in Pakistan and was a life-member of the Pakistan Academy of Letters. He was often invited to participate in PTV literary programmes and also was a frequent newspaper columnist in many Pakistani newspapers.

On 9 March 2003, an event was organized in Jilani Kamran's memory by the Halqa-e Arbab-e Zauq, Islamaabad where many contemporary Pakistani scholars paid him tributes.

== Awards and recognition ==
Year	Award	Nominated work	Result
1986	Tamgha-e-Imtiaz	—N/a	Won
2002	Pride of Performance	—N/a	Won
—N/a	Tamgha-e-Quaid-e-Azam	—N/a	Won
—N/a	Adamjee Literary Award	—N/a	Won

== Books ==
Jilani's books include:

=== Urdu ===
- Astanze (اِسٹنزے – "Stanzas") – A pioneering collection experimenting with stanza-based structures in Urdu poetry.
- Naqsh-e-Kaf-e-Pa (نقشِ کفِ پا – "Imprint of the Sole") – Reflective poems with symbolic and philosophical depth.
- Tanqeed Ka Naya Pas-e-Manzar (تنقید کا نیا پسِ منظر – "A New Perspective on Criticism") – Essays re-examining modern Urdu literary criticism.
- Choti Badi Nazmein (چھوٹی بڑی نظمیں – "Short and Long Poems") – A mix of short and long-form modern Urdu nazms.
- Ghalib ki Tahzeebi Shakhsiyat (غالب کی تہذیبی شخصیت – "The Cultural Personality of Ghalib") – A critical study of Ghalib’s cultural and intellectual legacy.
- Iqbal aur Hamara Ahd (اقبال اور ہمارا عہد – "Iqbal and Our Age") – Analyzes the relevance of Allama Iqbal in modern contexts.
- Quaid-e-Azam aur Azadi ki Tehreek (قائداعظم اور آزادی کی تحریک – "Quaid-e-Azam and the Freedom Movement") – Reflections on Pakistan’s independence and national leadership.
- Angrezi Zaban aur Adab ki Tadrees mein Qaumi Zaban ka Kirdar (انگریزی زبان اور ادب کی تدریس میں قومی زبان کا کردار – "The Role of Urdu in Teaching English Literature") – Discusses the pedagogical importance of Urdu in English education.
- Qaumi Zaban aur Ilaqai Zabanon ka Rishta (قومی زبان اور علاقائی زبانوں کا رشتہ – "The Relationship Between National and Regional Languages") – Examines Urdu’s interaction with Pakistan’s regional dialects.
- Bagh-e-Dunya (باغِ دنیا – "Garden of the World") – A poetry collection exploring existential and spiritual themes.
- Dastaveez (دستاویز – "Documents") – Prose writings on literary history and criticism.
- Nai Nazm ke Taqazay (نئی نظم کے تقاضے – "Demands of the New Nazm") – Reflections on contemporary trends in Urdu poetry.
- Ibn-e-Arabi (ابنِ عربی – "Ibn Arabi") – A study of the Sufi metaphysical doctrines of Ibn Arabi.
- Ustadey (استادے – "Mentors") – Essays about significant literary and academic influences.
- Zinda Rahnuma Quaid-e-Azam (زندہ رہنما قائدِ اعظم – "The Living Leader: Quaid-e-Azam") – Tribute to Muhammad Ali Jinnah’s ideological legacy.
- Ek Kali Do Bastiyan (ایک کلی دو بستیاں – "One Bud, Two Settlements") – Thematic reflections on displacement and identity.
- Nazarya Pakistan ka Adabi aur Fikri Mutala (نظریہِ پاکستان کا ادبی و فکری مطالعہ – "A Literary and Intellectual Study of the Ideology of Pakistan") – Essays exploring the cultural underpinnings of national ideology.
- Qaumiyat ki Tashkeel aur Urdu Zaban (قومیت کی تشکیل اور اردو زبان – "The Formation of National Identity and the Urdu Language") – Essays on the link between language and nationalism.
- Baqi Nazmein (باقی نظمیں – "Remaining Poems") – A collection of selected, possibly unpublished, poems.
- Adab ke Makhfi Ishare (ادب کے مخفی اشارے – "Hidden Symbols in Literature") – Analysis of literary symbolism and implicit meanings.

=== English ===
- Ana Al-Haqq Reconsidered: With a translation of Kitab al-Tawasin by Mansur Hallaj – A scholarly reconsideration of Hallaj’s mystical thought, with annotated translation.
- The South Asian Muslim Creative Mind – A cultural and literary study of Muslim intellectual creativity in South Asia.
- Cultural Images in Post-Iqbal World – Essays analyzing cultural developments in the Muslim world after Iqbal.
- Pakistan: A Cultural Metaphor – Reflections on Pakistani identity and cultural consciousness.
- Cross Currents in Urdu Literature – Essays on modern trends, movements, and influences in Urdu literature.
- Selected Poems of Khwaja Ghulam Farid – English translations of the celebrated Sufi poet Khwaja Ghulam Farid’s mystical verses.
