= Udaas Naslain =

1964 Urdu novel by Abdullah Hussain

Udaas Naslain اداس نسلیں
- Author: Abdullah Hussain
- Language: Urdu
- Subject: British India
- Genre: Novel
- Publisher: Sang-e-Meel Publications
- Publication date: First 1964; last 2015
- Publication place: Pakistan
- Dewey Decimal: 891.4393

Udaas Naslain (translated into English as The Weary Generations) is an Urdu novel by Pakistani writer Abdullah Hussain. His debut novel, it led to his rise to prominence in Urdu literature. It won the Adamjee Literary Award in 1963, the year of its publication. It is considered as a masterpiece and one of the greatest novels in Urdu literature. It was translated into English and published in London in 1964/1999.

The original edition of the book had a cover by Abdur Rahman Chughtai. The English edition was translated by Asghar Nadeem Syed.

The book is a work of episodic fiction and focuses on the roughly 35 years leading up to the Partition of India.

== Overview ==
The book is divided in three parts as World War I days to, Indian independence day and culminating in Partition.

The protagonist of the novel, Naeem, a Victoria Cross winner who after showing gallantry in Belgium and France returns to his village Roshan pur. The highlights of novel include trench warfare of World War I, village life, Jallianwala Bagh massacre and Qissa Khwani massacre.

== Plagiarism allegations ==
Qurratulain Hyder accused that several chapters of the novel were written in a style that closely resembled her work, including Aag Ka Darya, with entire sentences and paragraphs plagiarized, albeit with slight variations.
