= Fatehpur Chaurasi =

- Town
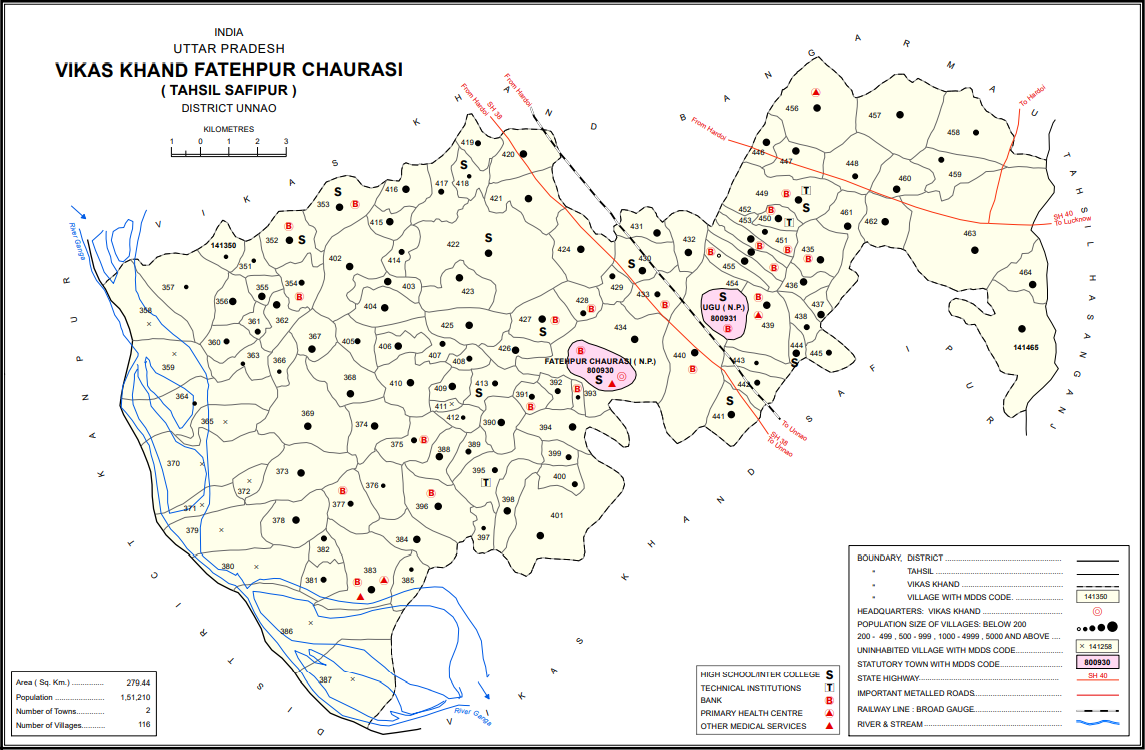
- Map of Fatehpur Chaurasi CD block

- Location in Uttar Pradesh, India Fatehpur Chaurasi (India)
- Coordinates: 26.7833°N 80.275°E
- Country: India
- State: Uttar Pradesh
- District: Unnao

Area
  - Total: 2 km^{2} (0.77 sq mi)

Population (2011)
  - Total: 6,715
  - Density: 3,400/km^{2} (8,700/sq mi)

Languages
  - Official: Hindi
- Time zone: UTC+5:30 (IST)
- Vehicle registration: UP
- Website: up.gov.in

Fatehpur Chaurasi is a town and a nagar panchayat in Unnao district in the state of Uttar Pradesh, India. First officially classified as a town for the 1981 census, Fatehpur Chaurasi is located on the north bank of the Kalyani river, a bit to the south of the main road from Unnao to Bangarmau. Local industries include the production of furniture, boxes, almirahs, shoes, and slippers. As of 2011, the town's population is 6,715, in 1,158 households.

== Demographics ==
Historical population
Year	Pop.	±%
1981	3,407	—
1991	4,242	+24.5%
2001	5,417	+27.7%
2011	6,715	+24.0%
Source: 2011 Census of India

According to the 2001 census, Fatehpur Chaurasi had a population of 5424. Males constitute 53% of the population and females 47%. Fatehpur Chaurasi has an average literacy rate of 52%, lower than the national average of 59.5%: male literacy is 60%, and female literacy is 44%. In Fatehpur Chaurasi, 17% of the population is under 6 years of age.

According to the 2011 census, Fatehpur Chaurasi has a population of 6,715 people, in 1,158 households. The town's sex ratio is 892 females to every 1000 males; 3,550 of Fatehpur Chaurasi's residents are male and 3,165 are female. Among the 0-6 age group, the sex ratio is 955, which is higher than the district urban average. Members of Scheduled Castes make up 7.3% of the town's population, while no members of scheduled tribes were recorded. The town's literacy rate was 70.1% (counting only people age 7 and up); literacy was higher among men and boys (78.6%) than among women and girls (60.4%).

In terms of employment, 18.0% of Fatehpur Chaurasi residents were classified as main workers (i.e. people employed for at least 6 months per year) in 2011. Marginal workers (i.e. people employed for less than 6 months per year) made up 10.4%, and the remaining 71.6% were non-workers. Employment status varied heavily according to gender, with 45.7% of men being either main or marginal workers, compared to only 9.0% of women.

== Education ==
Fatehpur chaurasi has a Jawahar Navodaya Vidyalaya, where students of different parts of the district of unnao come to study

== Office ==
Fatehpur chaurasi has a Sarkari Result Head Office, where students of different parts of the district of unnao come to get help

== Villages ==
Fatehpur Chaurasi CD block has the following 116 villages:

Village name	Total land area (hectares)	Population (in 2011)
Lokiabad Pur	123	403
Roop Pur Paya	116	348
Raje Pur	279.6	1,478
Shiv Puri	310.3	2,945
Manika Pur	230.8	635
Hardas Pur	87.7	1,401
Jait Pur	298	1,212
Neak Pur	220.1	408
Katri Jaisar Mao	177	0
Katri Matlabpur	112	0
Rustam Pur	218.8	590
Khaira Gara	62.1	660
Umer Pur Pitam	196	1,978
Thakkea Kamruddeen Pur	192.2	440
Saharia Salem Pur Istmurari	198.8	467
Saharia Salempur Gairistmurari	62.3	0
Newada Bhairva	74.7	275
Lakhana Pur	186.9	1,043
Samas Pur Atia Kabool Pur	377.3	2,218
Jajamao Ahatmali	1,576.6	2,472
Katri Radhan	131.3	0
Katri Saraia Ganj	20.7	0
Katri Saraya Gair Ahatmali	111.2	0
Jaja Mao Gair Ahatmali	451.9	4,678
Khairi Gurdaspur	324.6	1,226
Allaudeen Pur	223.6	886
Bardhae	130.2	387
Ismail Pur	130.7	638
Garae	94	1,138
Katri Panka	100.9	0
Katri Pyare Pur	119.5	0
Hindupur	133.2	781
Arjun Pur	103.6	542
Dabaoli	305	3,856
Khanpur Bichaoli	219.6	1,309
Bhadehara	98	400
Katri Torna Istmurari	523.2	0
Katri Torna Gair Istmurari	423.7	0
Lawani	207.5	1,151
Abdulla Pur	174.9	848
Hyaspur Pur	181.5	1,256
Boocha Gara	91.6	632
Tamlev Pur	113.4	771
Baburiha	38.3	209
Jamruddeen Pur	139.9	1,162
Khoajgi Pur Pahalwan	81.8	640
Sarhasakat Pur	262.6	1,560
Husainpur Mafi	67.5	384
Sahanagar	94.6	1,185
Majharia Khurd	58.3	507
Majharia Kala	80.3	776
Soosu Mao	766.9	3,807
Baruaghat	315	2,206
Sahapur Khurd	134.3	1,160
Sahapur Bujurg	210.4	1,048
Kajipur Kachehh	160	840
Fardapur	132.1	1,229
Boolapur Hasan Pur	177.5	985
Gaori Mao	94.4	958
Gangadas Pur	131.7	1,014
Jhulu Mao	285	2,092
Chaksujat Pur	19.2	0
Dugwan	94.5	400
Akhtyar Pur	156	793
Samasa Pur	188.2	942
Khanpur Kuraoli	184.3	1,214
Daolat Pur	196.9	1,477
Dashari	194.2	970
Naghari	146	435
Husain Pur Naghari	131.7	691
Hafijabad	279.6	2,487
Fakhara Pur	272	1,868
Bhadsar Naosahara	1,025.2	5,462
Gajffarpur Paisra	234.7	1,370
Tanda Satan	387.4	2,234
Serpur Achhirachha	316.6	1,689
Pithanhara	142	1,022
Dostpur Soli	172.8	1,680
Dhakhia	99.2	506
Ahamdabad Sen Nagar	168.6	914
Kathigara	152.9	1,483
Selapur	155.2	1,006
Sadullapur	308.8	1,064
Kajipur Banger	154.3	751
Fatehpur Chaorasi	922.5	3,531
Mahendrasingh nagar	236.5	1,106
Matlab Pur	158.8	1,061
Kudeena	208.1	1,114
Salhe Pur Purwa	102.8	851
Ugu Dehat	1,120.9	1,204
Ahamdabad Mathar	479.7	3,124
Sarayakhtyar Pur	231.8	2,496
Jasra	98.2	686
Maruf Pur	61.4	458
Rajjak Pur	33.7	1,041
Ajgawan	128.1	820
Tanda Meeta	142.7	1,201
Pataoli	175.2	2,090
Nasir Pur	272.2	540
Sainta	503.4	6,136
Sakurabad	44.7	1,355
Julafkar Pur	125.3	958
Patti Usman	91.9	1,255
Husen Nager Patti Parasram	110.6	1,991
Patti Hameed	73.7	1,522
Patti Makhan	78.4	70
Nigohi	588	5,175
Pesari	560.8	1,812
Rajepur Garant	509.1	808
Fatehabad Garant	211.2	636
Tikana	189.4	2,187
Khevrae	167.4	1,631
Muhiuddeen Pur	218.6	1,141
Bari Thana	1,225.6	6,257
Baraoki	213.4	1,283
Udesaha	735.1	3,978
