= Khushboo =

Khushboo is a female given name of Persian origin, which means 'fragrance'. It may refer to:

== Film and television ==
- Khushboo (1954 film), a 1954 Bollywood film
- Khushboo (1975 film), a Hindi drama film by Gulzar
- Khushboo (1979 film), a Pakistani film
- Khushboo (2008 film), a Hindi romantic film by Rajesh Ram Singh
- Khushboo Bangla, Indian TV channel broadcasting in the Bengali-language

== People ==
- Khushboo (Pakistani actress) (1969-2024), Pakistani actress
- Khushboo Grewal (born 1984), Punjabi actress, VJ and singer from India
- Kushboo Ramnawaj (born 1990), Mauritian beauty pageant contestant
- Khushbu Sundar (born 1970), Indian actress, film producer and politician

== See also ==
- Khushbu (disambiguation)
