= Jamila Hashmi =

Pakistani novelist (1934–1988)

- Born: 1934; Amritsar, Punjab, British India
- Died: 1988 (aged 53–54); Pakistan
- Education: Masters (English literature)
- Alma mater: Forman Christian College
- Occupations: Novelist, Short story writer
- Spouse: Sardar Ahmed Awaisi
- Writing career
- Language: Urdu
- Notable awards: Adamjee Literary Award

Jamila Hashmi (1929/1934 – 1988) was a Pakistani novelist and short story writer of in Urdu language. She wrote her first novel titled Attish-e-Rufta which was adapted as a TV serial. She later wrote Talash-e-Baharan, a novel that later became the recipient of Adamjee Literary Award. She also wrote short stories such as her Rang Bhoom, and Aap Bieti-Jug Bieti besides writing novels such as Apna Apna Jahanum and a narrative prose fiction titled Rohi.

She was born in 1934 in Amritsar, British India. Some argue that she was born in 1929. After partition of the subcontinent, she migrated to Pakistan in 1947 and settled in Sahiwal, however she moved to Lahore where she obtained a master's degree in English literature from Forman Christian College. She married Sardar Ahmed Awaisi with whom she has a daughter, Ayesha Siddiqa.

== Career ==
She wrote numerous novels and short stories focused on the culture, life of Punjabis, and Sikh art and culture in particular. She also wrote a novel titled Sherry which was depicted in a drama performed at Alhamra Arts Council by Sheema Kermani, a Pakistani social activist. Her book When Memories Become Traumatic revolves around partition of India.

Her novels such as Dasht-e-Soos, Chehra ba Chehra Roo-ba-Roo, Talash-e-Baharan consist fictional characters about her idealism. Her short story titled Banished talks about a Muslim girl disturbed by violence caused during the partition.
