= Sufi Motahar Hossein =

- সুফী মোতাহার হোসেন
- Born: 11 September 1907; Faridpur District, Eastern Bengal and Assam, British India
- Died: 20 August 1975 (aged 67)
- Education: University of Dhaka
- Occupations: Poet; Novelist; Philosopher; Educationalist
- Spouse: Asia Khanam
- Children: 4, Gulfam Shahana Banu, Abdullah Al Mamun, Obaidullah Al Muntansir, Nilufar Banu
- Parent(s): Mohammad Hashim (Father); Tayebatunnisa Khatun (Mother)
- Relatives: Mozammel Hossein (Brother); Sufia Akter (Sister); Iskandar Mohammad Salim (Father in-law); Nurjahan Salim (Mother in-law); Khan Bahadur Abdus Salam (Grandfather in-Law)
- Awards: Bangla Academy Literary Award (1974); Adamjee Literary Award (1965); Presidency Award (1970)

Sufi Motahar Hossein (11 September 1907 – 20 August 1975) was a prominent Bangladeshi poet. He wrote poetry in the sonnet genre. Hossein was born in a highly respectable and educated Muslim family. His Father Mohammad Hashim was a Sub-Inspector of Bengal Police. His Mother Tayebatunnisa Khatun was a landlord. He was awarded Bangla Academy Literary Award in 1974, Presidency Award in 1970 and Adamjee Literary Award in 1965 in the poetry category.

== Education and career ==
Hossein studied in Faridpur Zilla School and Jagannath College. He graduated from the University of Dhaka in 1931.

Hossein worked in the District Judge's court at Faridpur.

== Awards ==
- Bangla Academy Literary Award (1975)
- Presidency Award (1970)
- Adamjee Literary Award (1965)
