= Social Policy and Development Centre =

Pakistani-based research institute

The Social Policy and Development Centre (SPDC) is an economic policy research institution in Karachi, Pakistan, that focuses on social development and influencing government policies. Its research areas include monetary policy, fiscal policy, poverty, inequality, education, governance, gender, international trade and pro-poor macroeconomic policy. Major activities of SPDC include research and policy analysis, social sector database support, institutional analysis and development, project evaluation, project monitoring and training & capacity Building of government employees, civil society members and academics.

Prof. Dr. Hafeez A. Pasha founded the institute. Muhammad Asif Iqbal is currently managing director.
