= Yasmeen Hameed =

Pakistani writer

- Born: 1952 (age 73–74); Pakistan
- Occupations: Pakistani Urdu poet, translator, educator, Founding Director of Gurmani Centre for South Asian Languages and Literature in the Social Sciences Department at the Lahore University of Management Sciences (LUMS) from 2007 to August 2016
- Writing career
- Language: Urdu
- Notable works: Pas-e-Aina (1988), Hisar-e-be-Dar-o-Deevar (1991), Aadha Din aur Aadhi Raat (1996), Fana bhi eik Saraab (2001), Doosri Zindagi (Collected poems, 1988–2001) (2007), Janoobi Asia Ki Muntakhib Nazmain (2022)
- Notable awards: Tamgha-e-Imtiaz (Medal of Distinction) for Literature awarded by the Government of Pakistan in 2008, Fatima Jinnah Medal for Literature awarded by the Government of Punjab, Pakistan on International Women’s Day, 8 March 2006

Yasmeen Hameed (Urdu: یاسمین حمید) is a Pakistani Urdu poet, translator and educator.

== Career ==
Yasmeen Hameed has more than thirty years of experience in the fields of education, literature and art. She was the Founding Director of Gurmani Centre for South Asian Languages and Literature, in the Social Sciences Department at the Lahore University of Management Sciences (LUMS) where she worked from 2007 to August 2016.

She has interviewed a number of renowned Pakistani literary personalities on Pakistani television and has participated widely in poetry symposia at national and international levels.

She has written scripts in English for cultural/fashion shows sponsored by the Government of Pakistan, performed in London in 1995 and Washington in 1996 and in the Cricket World Cup Cultural Festival in Pakistan in 1996. She has also contributed a monthly column to the "Books & Authors" supplement of Dawn newspaper.

== Education ==
M. Sc.: Nutrition
Punjab University – Lahore (1972)
B. Sc.: Home Economics- Home Economics College
Punjab University – Lahore (1970)

== Original works ==
Yasmeen Hameed has published five books of poetry in Urdu:

Title	Year Published	Pages
Pas-e-Aina	1988	160
Hisar-e-be-Dar-o-Deevar	1991	160
Aadha Din aur Aadhi Raat	1996	237
Fana bhi eik Saraab	2001	216
Doosri Zindagi (Collected poems, 1988–2001)	2007	700

== Awards for poetry and literature ==
- Pakistani Urdu Verse, UBL/Jang Literary Excellence Award (2012)
- Tamgha-e-Imtiaz (Medal of Distinction) for Literature awarded by the Government of Pakistan in 2008
- Fatima Jinnah Medal for Literature awarded by the Government of Punjab, Pakistan on International Women’s Day, 8 March 2006
- Ahmed Nadeem Qasmi Award for Poetry (2001) for the collection, Fana bhi eik saraab
- Hijra Award for Hijra year 1417 (June 1996 – May 1997)
- Allama Iqbal Award for the collection, Aadha Din aur Aadhi Raat.
- Roll of Honour and Gold Medal from Punjab University, Lahore (1972)

== Works to be published ==
- Contemporary Verse from Pakistan (English)
- Fifth collection of poetry (Urdu) titled Bay- samar pairhon ki khwahish.
