= Sahdullahpur =

- Village
- Location in Lalganj, Bihar, India
- Coordinates: 25°54′N 85°09′E
- Country: India
- State: Bihar
- District: Vaishali district

Languages
  - Official: Bajjika, Hindi
- Time zone: UTC+5:30 (IST)
- PIN: 844121
- Lok Sabha constituency: Hajipur
- Vidhan Sabha constituency: Lalganj
- Website: vaishali.bih.nic.in

Sahdullahpur is a village in Bihar in the Vaishali district. It is about five kilometers from the nearest town, Lalganj. The name of its panchayat is the name of the village Sahdullahpur. The village is not so big according to the geographical area. It is expected to be about 650 acres of land acquired by the village. Its north border is shared by Hussaina and Amritpur and its southern border is shared by Jaitipur and Sarariya. The village has its own post office with the pin code 844121.

The village has a primary school (for which land acquisition was with the donation by the first Mukhiya of this Panchayat Sri Suresh Prasad Singh).

The village comes under Lalganj Vidhan Shabha Constituency No. 124 and its Lokshabha constituency is Hajipur.

Bhumihar is the major caste in this village; other castes are also present.

The people of this village are mostly dependent on agriculture for their survival. There are also many government employees in this village working for various government departments.
