= Abdullah Hussain (writer, born 1931) =

Writer

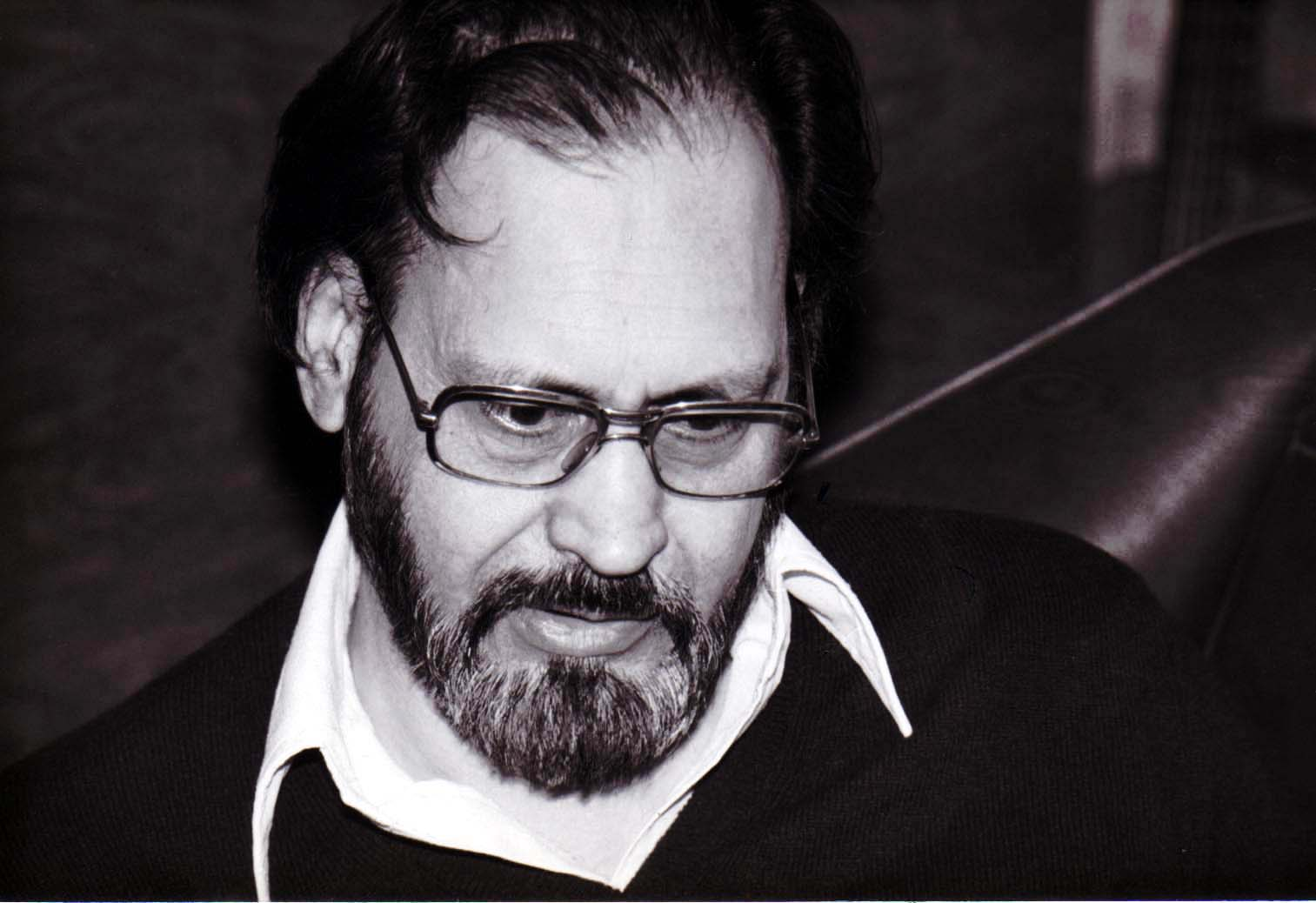
- Abdullah Hussain in January 1982
- Born: Muhammad Khan; 14 August 1931; Gujrat, Punjab, British India
- Died: 4 July 2015 (aged 83); Lahore, Pakistan
- Occupation: Novelist
- Notable work: Udaas Naslain
- Awards: Adamjee Literary Award; Kamal-e-Fun Award

Signature
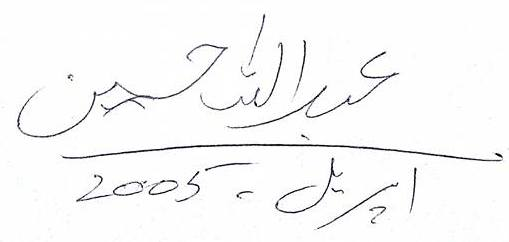

Abdullah Hussain (Urdu: عبداللہ حسین), (14 August 1931 – 4 July 2015) was an Urdu novelist and short story writer from Gujrat. Among the prolific names of the Urdu literature, Hussain is widely recognised for his novel Udaas Naslain, for which he won the Adamjee Literary Award in 1963.

== Personal life ==
His ancestors migrated from Bannu to Punjab. His father worked as excise inspector and went to be farmer later on. Abdullah was his only and youngest son of three other children. His mother died when Abdullah was only six months old. His father was super protective about him. He preferred Abdullah to be with him in his free times. Reflection of this bond is often seen in his writings as well.

== Literary career ==
Abdullah Hussain shot into fame with his novel Udaas Naslainاُداس نسلیں. He was awarded the Adamjee Literary Award for this debut novel. Udaas Naslain اُداس نسلیں is considered as a milestone in Urdu literature. It is a story of a common man who entered into elite class by marriage but is not able to cope with it and eventually returns.

He also wrote Baagh باگھ in 1982, which focuses on Kashmir liberation. Baagh (A Lion) is a symbol of terror to everyone. His 1989 novel Qaid (prison) is a story of a newborn who was murdered in Karachi. Raat published in 1994 was also his novel of same genre. Later he wrote Nadaar Log (Urdu: نادارلوگ) in 1996 which is based on the 1971 war between India and Pakistan. The novel focuses on Sarfraz's story who was posted in East Pakistan and went on to become a prisoner of war and reveals the causes behind the Dhaka fall. He also wrote collections of short stories Nashaib نشیب and Faraib فریب, and a novel in English about the Afghan jihad.

Among his works, the novelette Raat has been translated into Persian by Samira Gilani.

== Death ==
He had been suffering from blood cancer for several years. He was taken to the National Defence Hospital after his condition deteriorated. Later, he was brought back to his home where he died on 4 July 2015.

== Literary works ==
- Udaas Naslain (Novel)
- Nadaar Log (Novel)
- Baagh (Novel)
- Qyd (Novella)
- Raat (Novella)
- Wapasi Ka Safar (Novel)
- Nashaib (Collection of Short stories)
- Faraib (collection of short stories)
