= Sabihuddin Ahmed =

Pakistani jurist

Sabihuddin Ahmed صبیح الدین احمد

Chief Justice Sindh High Court
- In office 5 April 2005 – 3 November 2007
- Preceded by: Saiyed Saeed Ashhad
- Succeeded by: Afzal Soomro

Personal details
- Born: 1949 Hyderabad, Sindh
- Died: 19 April 2009 (aged 60)
- Education: University of Punjab, Lahore; University of Karachi

Sabihuddin Ahmed (Urdu: صبیح الدین احمد; 1949–2009) was a Pakistani jurist who served as the chief justice of the Sindh High Court from 2005 to 2007 and later as a judge of the Supreme Court of Pakistan.

== Early life and education ==
Ahmed was born in Hyderabad, Sindh in 1949 to senior civil officer Wajihuddin Ahmed and Atiya Bano. He was the oldest of five siblings, following him were Mehrunissa Ahmad Ali, Aminuddin Ahmed, Lalarukh Jamil and Nooruddin Ahmed. He passed his MA from the University of Punjab, Lahore in 1969 and his LLB from the University of Karachi.

== Family ==
He is survived by his wife Nelofer Ahmed, daughter and journalist Sanaa Ahmed, son and barrister Salahuddin Ahmed and son Rameezuddin Ahmed, who is currently pursuing his undergraduate degree from Canada. His grandfather was Maulana Salahuddin Ahmed, a prolific Urdu writer and editor of the Urdu literary magazine Adabi Dunya. Amongst his cousins are the human rights activists and sisters, Hina Jilani and Asma Jehangir, business leader Iqbal Z. Ahmed, thespian Salima Raza and activist Nigar Ahmad. His son Salahuddin is a partner in Munir A. Malik's law firm, the same law firm Sabihuddin was a partner of before he became a judge.

== Career ==
He joined the legal profession in 1972, working under his maternal uncle Khalid M. Ishaq. He was a founder member of the Human Rights Commission of Pakistan (HRCP) and its first vice chairperson for Sindh.

Ahmed was elevated to the bench on 11 January 1997. He resigned from the HRCP at that time. During the same year, he gave a landmark judgement regarding monetary compensation to a detenu in a habeas corpus petition.

He was elevated to the Supreme Court during the regime of military ruler Pervez Musharraf but refused to take oath under the Provisional Constitutional Order (PCO). Once a democratic government was restored, he took the oath and served as a Supreme Court judge from September 19, 2008, until his death on April 18, 2009.

Legal offices
Preceded by Saiyed Saeed Ashhad	Chief Justice of the Sindh High Court; 5 April 2005 – 3 November 2007	Succeeded by Afzal Soomro
