= Kishwar Naheed =

Pakistani writer

Kishwar Naheed کشور ناہید
- Born: Kishwar Naheed; 18 June 1940; Bulandshahr, Uttar Pradesh, British India
- Occupations: Poet, Writer
- Spouse(s): Yousaf Kamran (m. 1960; d. 1984)
- Awards: Sitara-i-Imtiaz (Star of Excellence) Award (2020); Kamal-e-Fun Award (2015); Mandela Prize (1997); Adamjee Literary Award (1968)

Kishwar Naheed (Urdu: کشور ناہید) (born 18 June 1940) is a feminist Urdu poet and writer from Pakistan. She has written several poetry books. She has also received awards including Sitara-e-Imtiaz for her literary contribution to Urdu literature.

== Early life ==
Kishwar Naheed was born in 1940 to a Syed family in Bulandshahr, British India. After the partition, she migrated to Lahore, Pakistan with her family in 1949. Kishwar was a witness to the violence (including rape and abduction of women) associated with the partition of India. The bloodshed at that time left a lasting impression on her at a tender age. As a young girl, Kishwar was inspired by the girls who had started going to Aligarh Muslim University in those times. The white kurta and white gharara under a black burqa that they wore looked so elegant to her and she wanted to go to college, to educate herself.

She finished Adeeb Fazil degree in Urdu and also learned the Persian language. She had become a voracious reader in her teenage years and read everything that she chanced upon — ranging from the works of Dostoyevsky to the English dictionary published by Neval Kishore Press.

She struggled and fought to receive an education, when women were not allowed to go to school. She studied at home and received a high school diploma through correspondence courses. After matriculation, there was a lot of family resistance to her taking admission in college but her brother, Syed Iftikhar Zaidi, paid for her tuition and helped her continue her formal education. In Pakistan, she went on to obtain a Bachelor of Arts in 1958 and a Master's in Economics in 1960 from Punjab University, Lahore. Kishwar married her friend, poet Yousuf Kamran in 1960 and the couple have two sons. After her husband's death in 1984, she worked to raise her children and support the family.

== Career ==
Kishwar Naheed has published 12 volumes of her poetry in both Pakistan and India. Her Urdu poetry has also been published in foreign languages all over the world. Her famous poem 'We Sinful Women' (Urdu: ہم گنہگار عورتیں), affectionately referred to as the women's anthem among Pakistani feminists, gave its title to a groundbreaking anthology of contemporary Urdu feminist poetry, translated and edited by Rukhsana Ahmad and published in London by The Women's Press in 1991.

Kishwar Naheed has also written eight books for children and won the prestigious UNESCO award for children's literature. Her love for children is as much as her concern for women. She expresses this concern in her poem, Asin Burian We Loko, which is a touching focus on the plight of women in the present male-dominated society. Naheed has served in major positions in various national institutions. She was Director General of Pakistan National Council of the Arts before her retirement. She also edited a prestigious literary magazine Mahe Naw and founded an organisation Hawwa (Eve) whose goal is to help women without an independent income become financially independent through cottage industries and selling handicrafts.

== Politics and feminism ==
Kishwar Naheed has been witness to the struggles and aspirations that Pakistan has gone through as a nation. Her written work, spanning more than four decades, chronicles her experiences as a woman writer engaged in the creative and civic arenas, even as she has dealt with personal, social, and official backlashes.

Months after the Partition of India – a little before her family moved to Lahore from Bulandshahr – Kishwar saw something which left a lasting impression on her mind and her heart. The pain and sadness she felt in those moments have stayed with her. Some Muslim girls who belonged to Bulandshahr were kidnapped during the Partition riots. Either they succeeded in running away from their captors or were rescued, they arrived back in Bulandshahr. Some were known to her family and she accompanied her mother and sisters to go see them. They looked haggard, exhausted and broken. Surrounded by other women who were trying to console them, they were all lying down on the floor or reclining against the walls in a large room. The feet of these women were badly bruised and soaked in blood. That was the moment when Kishwar Naheed says she stopped being just a child and became a girl child. She became a woman. She still remembers those blood-soaked feet and says "Women and girls anywhere have their feet soaked in blood. Very little has changed over the decades. This must end".

Influenced by the Progressive Writers' Movement in South Asia and the ideals of socialism, Kishwar Naheed witnessed major international political upheavals; Pakistan was under martial law and new ideas and forms were being introduced and appreciated in Urdu literature. Kishwar and her friends got involved in everything. One day they would take a procession out in support of Gamal Abdel Nasser and the Egyptian right over the Suez Canal, the next day they would bring out a rally for Vietnam or Palestine or Latin America.

In an interview to the Pakistani monthly magazine, The Herald (Pakistan), Kishwar Naheed commenting on censorship says:

"we must not forget that creative writers and artists do not live in isolation. It is natural to react to and comment on the political and social circumstances in which one lives. On one hand, it is said that creative people are more sensitive and concerned while, on the other hand, it is argued that they must confine themselves to writing about themselves or their inner feelings. It is fine that we should write about our inner feelings but when Malala [Yousafzai] was shot or girl schools in Swat were being razed to the ground, it was my inner feeling that I wrote about. My poems will now be seen as a critical social comment and some may call these political poems but these poems represent my inner feelings......Creativity cannot be regulated nor should it be. Who would know this better than a woman writer or artist who has to struggle all her life to be able to express what she feels and thinks, to be able to articulate the way she wishes to articulate, to be able to present to the world what she wishes to present in her own unique way."

"This freedom to write and express has come through a struggle drenched in tears".

Kishwar Naheed also champions the cause of peace in South Asia and has played a significant role in promoting Pakistan India People's Forum and South Asian Association for Regional Cooperation (SAARC) Writers Forum. She has participated in global literary and cultural movements bringing together writers and artists who believe in a fair and equitable global political order. Her powerful poems against extremist religious thought, violence, terrorism and increased suffering of women and girls due to radicalization have created waves locally and internationally.

== Literary works ==
Kishwar Naheed is widely acclaimed for her sharp and incisive poetic expression, for being bold and direct, and, for celebrating the universal human struggle for equality, justice and freedom. She also writes a regular weekly newspaper column in Daily Jang. Commentators and critics have noticed that, with time, her voice has grown "louder, more insistent and somehow more intimate".

Her first poetry collection was Lab-e Goya, published in 1968, that won the Adamjee Literary Award.

Books (selected works)
Year	Title	Publisher	Notes
1968	Lab-i goyā	Lahore: Maktabah-yi Karvan	The first collection of poetry Won the Adamjee Literary Award
2006	Warq Warq Aaina	Sang-e-Meel Publications	
2016	Aabad Kharaba	Afzal Ahmad	
	Buri Aurat Ki Khata		Autobiography
2012	Chand Ki Beti	Maktaba Payam-e-Taleem, New Delhi	
2001	Dasht-e-Qais Men Laila - Kulliyat	Sang-e-Meel Publications, Lahore	
2010	Aurat Mard Ka Rishta	Sang-e-Meel Publications	
1978	Galiyan Dhoop Darwaze (Lanes, Sunshine, Doors)	Mohammad Jameelunnabi	
2012	Jadu Ki Handiyan	Maktaba Payam-e-Taleem, New Delhi	
1996	Khawateen Afsana Nigar	Niyaz Ahmad	
2011	Raat Ke Musafir	Director Qaumi Council Bara-e- Farogh-e-Urdu Zaban New Delhi	
2012	Sher Aur Bakri	Maktaba Payam-e-Taleem, New Delhi	
2001	The Distance of a Shout	Oxford University Press	Urdu poems with English translations

Translated in other languages (selected works)
Year	Title	Translator	Translation of	Translated into	Publisher
2010	A Bad Woman's Story	Durdana Soomro	Buri Aurat Ki Katha	English	Oxford University Press, USA
-	We Sinful Women		Hum Gunehgar Aurtein	Many Languages	
-	Lips that Speak		Lab-i-goya	English	
-	Leaves of Reflections		Warq Warq Aaina	English	

Translations (selected works)
	Title	Translation of	Translated into	Publisher
1982	Aurat Ek Nafsiyati Mutala	The Second Sex by Simone de Beauvoir	Urdu	Deen Gard Publications Limited

Magazine (selected works)
Year	Title	Editor	Publisher	Volume
2012	Chahar-Soo	Gulzar Javed	Faizul Islam Printing Press, Rawalpindi	021

Selected ghazals
Title	Notes
ai rah-e-hijr-e-nau-faroz dekh ki hum thahar gae	Ghazal
apne lahu se nam likha ghair ka bhi dekh	Ghazal
bigdi baat banana mushkil badi baat banae kaun	Ghazal
bimar hain to ab dam-e-isa kahan se aae	Ghazal
dil ko bhi gham ka saliqa na tha pahle pahle	Ghazal
dukh ki gutthi kholenge	Ghazal
ek hi aawaz par wapas palat aaenge log	Ghazal
girya, mayusi, gham-e-tark-e-wafa kuchh na raha	Ghazal
har naqsh-e-pa ko manzil-e-jaan manna pada	Ghazal
hasrat hai tujhe samne baithe kabhi dekhun	Ghazal
hausla shart-e-wafa kya karna	Ghazal
hawa kuchh apne sawal tahrir dekhti hai	Ghazal
hum ki maghlub-e-guman the pahle	Ghazal
ishq ki gum-shuda manzilon mein gai	Ghazal
jab main na hun to shahr mein mujh sa koi to ho	Ghazal
kabhi to aa meri aankhon ki raushni ban kar	Ghazal
kahaniyan bhi gain qissa-khwaniyan bhi gain	Ghazal
khayal-e-tark-e-talluq ko talte rahiye	Ghazal
khushbu ko rangton pe ubharta hua bhi dekh	Ghazal
kuchh bol guftugu ka saliqa na bhul jae	Ghazal
kuchh din to malal us ka haq tha	Ghazal
kuchh itne yaad mazi ke fasane hum ko aae hain	Ghazal
meri aankhon mein dariya jhulta hai	Ghazal
mujhe bhula ke mujhe yaad bhi rakha tu ne	Ghazal
na koi rabt ba-juz khamushi o nafrat ke	Ghazal
nazar to aa kabhi aankhon ki raushni ban kar	Ghazal
pahan ke pairhan-e-gul saba nikalti hai	Ghazal
sambhal hi lenge musalsal tabah hon to sahi	Ghazal
sulagti ret pe aankhen bhi zer-e-pa rakhna	Ghazal
surkhi badan mein rang-e-wafa ki thi kuchh dinon	Ghazal
talash dariya ki thi ba-zahir sarab dekha	Ghazal
tere qarib pahunchne ke dhang aate the	Ghazal
tishnagi achchhi nahin rakhna bahut	Ghazal
tujhse wada aziz-tar rakkha	Ghazal
tumhaari yaad mein hum jashn-e-gham manaen bhi	Ghazal
umr mein us se badi thi lekin pahle tut ke bikhri main	Ghazal
wida karta hai dil satwat-e-rag-e-jaan ko	Ghazal
ye hausla tujhe mahtab-e-jaan hua kaise	Ghazal
zehn rahta hai badan khwab ke dam tak us ka	Ghazal

Selected poems
Title	Notes
aaKHiri faisla	
aaKHiri KHwahish	
ek nazm ijazaton ke liye	
ghas to mujh jaisi hai	
glass landscape	
hum gunahgar aurten	Pakistan's Feminist Anthem
kaDe kos	
kashid shab	
KHudaon se kah do	
nafi	
qaid mein raqs	
sone se pahle ek KHayal	

Selected children's poetry
Title	Publisher	Notes
aankh-micholi		
batakh aur sanp		
chidiya aur koyal		
Dais Dais Ki Kahanian	Ferozsons Pvt Ltd	UNESCO Prize for Children's Literature
gadhe ne bajai bansuri		
kutte aur khargosh		

== Awards and recognition ==
Year	Title	By	For
1968	Adamjee Literary Award		her first collection Lab-e-goya (1968)
	UNESCO Prize for Children's Literature		Dais Dais Ki Kahanian
	Best Translation award	Columbia University	
1997	Mandela Prize		
2000	Sitara-e-Imtiaz (Star of Excellence) Award	One of the highest honours bestowed by the President of Pakistan	her literary services to Pakistan
2015	Kamal-e-Fun Award (Lifetime Achievement Award) in Literature	Pakistan Academy of Letters	her life-long services to literature
2016	Premchand Fellowship	Sahitya Akademi of India	her contribution to SAARC literature

=== See also ===
- List of Pakistani poets
- List of Urdu language poets
- List of feminist poets
