= Pakistan Writers Guild =

Pakistani literary organisation

- Formation: 29 January 1959
- Founder: Maulvi Abdul Haq
- Founded at: Karachi
- Purpose: To protect the rights of writers of Pakistan

The Pakistan Writers Guild (Pākistān Rāʾiṭarz Gilḍ) is an association of writers and writers that was established on 29 January 1959 in Karachi under the chairmanship of Maulvi Abdul Haq and he became the first member of the association. The purpose of establishing this association was to protect the rights of writers of Pakistan. Almost all notable writers and poets of Pakistan were members of this association. Also, several literary awards were launched under the auspices of the Writers' Guild, which were considered the biggest and most important literary awards in Pakistan.
