= Adaptations of Twelve Angry Men =

Twelve Angry Men is an American courtroom drama written by Reginald Rose about the deliberations of a jury at a homicide trial. It was broadcast initially as a television play in 1954. Dramatic Publishing created a stage version of the teleplay in 1955. It was adapted for the screen in 1957, and Rose later adapted it to the stage himself. It has been the subject of numerous remakes, adaptations, and tributes in many languages.

== Description ==
The play explores the deliberations of a jury of a homicide trial, in which a dozen "men with ties and a coat" decide the fate of a teenager accused of murdering his abusive father. In the beginning, they are nearly unanimous in concluding the youth is guilty, influenced by their own background and upbringing. One man dissents, declaring him "not guilty", and he sows a seed of reasonable doubt. Eventually, he convinces the other jurors to look beyond their own personal bias and support a unanimous "not guilty" verdict.

American writer Reginald Rose first wrote this work as a teleplay for the Studio One anthology television series; it aired as a live CBS Television production on 20 September 1954. He adapted the story for 12 Angry Men directed by Sidney Lumet, and then for the stage under the same title.

== Stage adaptations ==
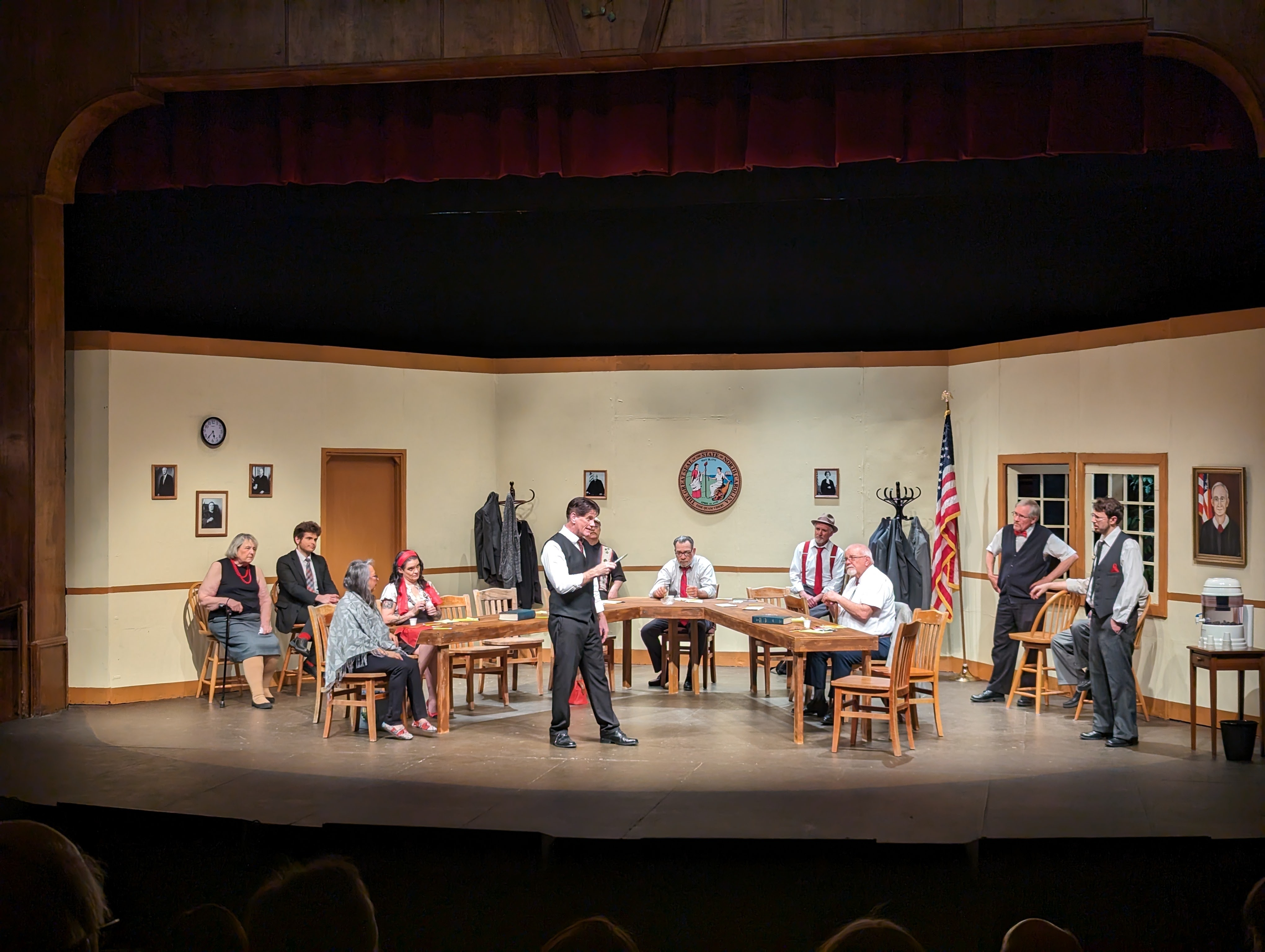
Actors perform the mixed-gender version "12 Angry Jurors" at a community theatre in North Carolina.

Twelve Angry Men was first adapted to the stage from Rose's teleplay by Sherman L. Sergel for Dramatic Publishing, premiering in San Francisco in 1955.

Following the film's release, the stage rights were sold, and foreign language versions were written. In 1958, Variety reported that Andre Obey's French version was a hit in Paris, while Horst Budjuhn's German version played in Munich and Frankfort with productions planned in three other German cities. They further reported that productions were scheduled or being planned in Switzerland, Iceland, East Germany, Poland, Yugoslavia, Greece, Turkey, Austria, Italy, Spain, Denmark, Sweden, Norway, and Finland.

Rose retained British rights for himself and planned his own stage adaptation for Broadway in 1960, though this did not materialize.

Sergel's adaptation continued to be performed by amateur theaters. It is still frequently performed, often as Twelve Angry Women and Twelve Angry Jurors, with all-women or mixed gender casts.

=== Reginald Rose's stage play ===
Rose's version made its London West End debut in 1964. A 1996 production directed by Harold Pinter transferred to the West End, and it was revived again in 2013.

An all-comedian version was performed at the Edinburgh Fringe Festival in 2003, and an Australian production of the same was done in 2005.

The play finally premiered on Broadway in 2004, produced by the Roundabout Theatre Company and starring Boyd Gaines.

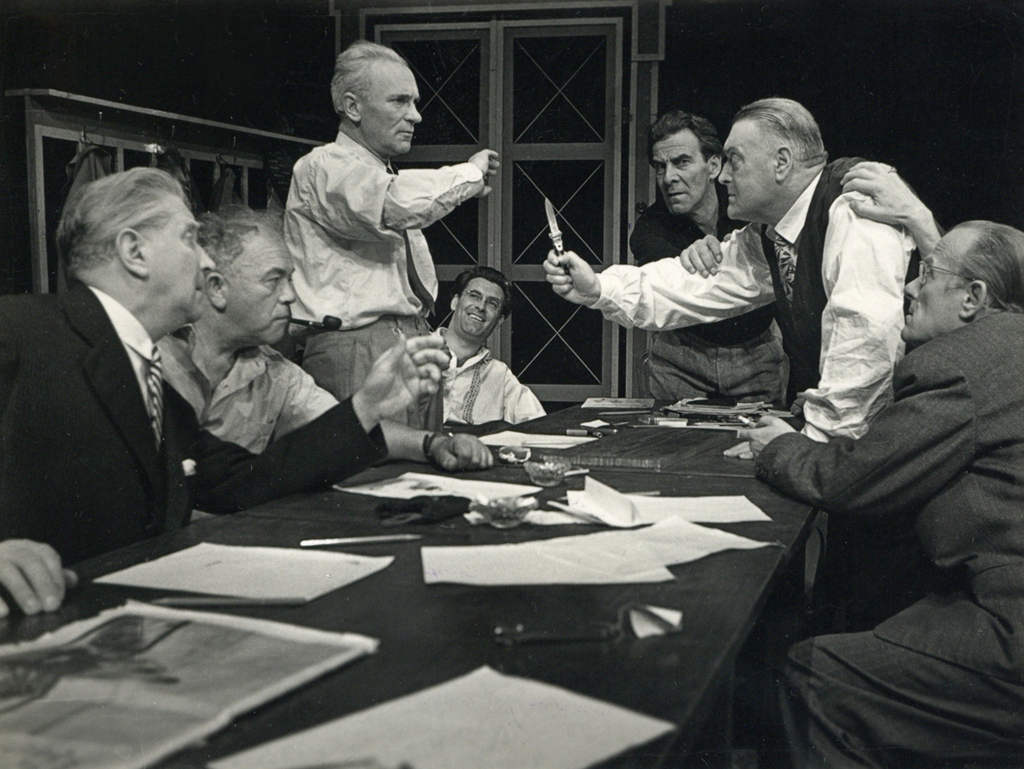
Horst Budjuhn's adaptation of the play at the Ljubljana Drama Theatre in 1959

=== Musical adaptation ===
In June–July 2022, Theater Latté Da in Minneapolis presented a world-premiere musical adaptation based on Reginald Rose's teleplay called Twelve Angry Men: A New Musical, with a book by David Simpatico and music and lyrics by Michael Holland.

=== Foreign language stage adaptations ===
The drama has since been translated into additional languages, including Hebrew and Japanese.

Nine Years Theatre in Singapore has produced a Mandarin language version twice, translated and directed by Nelson Chia, in 2013 and 2025.

In 2014, Independent Theatre Pakistan performed an adaptation of this play at Alhamra Arts Council, Lahore, directed by Azeem Hamid.

An Urdu adaptation by Wusatullah Khan titled Qusoorwaar premiered in Karachi, Pakistan, in 2016 directed by Sunil Shankar at the Karachi Theatre Festival.

A French translation by Francis Lombrail premiered at the Théâtre Hébertot in Paris in 2017, and has been included in Hébertot's season every year since through 2025-26.

== In other media ==
=== Films ===
It was written again in 1957 as a feature film, 12 Angry Men, which Sidney Lumet directed, and which starred Henry Fonda. It was nominated for Academy Awards in the categories of Best Director, Best Picture, and Best Writing of Adapted Screenplay.

Indian director Basu Chatterjee remade it in Hindi as Ek Ruka Hua Faisla in 1986. It was officially adapted by another Indian director Srijit Mukherji in Bengali as Shotyi Bole Shotyi Kichhu Nei.

In 2007, Russian film director Nikita Mikhalkov completed 12, his remake of the film. The jury of the 64th Venice Film Festival assigned its special prize to this remake "to acknowledge the consistent brilliance of Nikita Mikhalkov's body of work".

12 Angry Lebanese is a 2009 documentary film that chronicles efforts to stage an adaptation of Twelve Angry Men with inmates inside Beirut's Roumieh Prison.

In 2014, Chinese film director Xu Ang remade it as 12 Citizens. It was shown at the 2014 Rome Film Festival on October 19, 2014 and was released in China on May 15, 2015.

Vaaimai (2016) is a Tamil language adaptation of Twelve Angry Men.

=== Television ===
12 Angry Men was remade for television in 1997. Directed by William Friedkin, the remake stars George C. Scott, James Gandolfini, Tony Danza, William Petersen, Ossie Davis, Hume Cronyn, Courtney B. Vance, Armin Mueller-Stahl, Mykelti Williamson, Edward James Olmos, Dorian Harewood, and Jack Lemmon. In this production, the judge is a woman and four of the jurors are black, but most of the action and dialogue of the film are identical to the original. Modernizations include a prohibition on smoking in the jury room, the changing of references to income and pop culture figures, more dialogue relating to ethnicity, discussion about who else could have committed the murder if it was not the defendant, references to execution by lethal injection as opposed to the electric chair, and occasional profanity.

A film version of the CBS play was shown in 1973 on the Televisión Española (TVE1) show Estudio 1, with the title Doce hombres sin piedad ("Twelve Men Without Mercy").

In 1963, the West German television channel ZDF produced a film adaptation under the title Die zwölf Geschworenen.

=== Radio ===
In 2005, L.A. Theatre Works recorded an audio version of 12 Angry Men, directed by John de Lancie, with a cast including Dan Castellaneta, Jeffrey Donovan, Héctor Elizondo, Robert Foxworth, Kevin Kilner, Richard Kind, Armin Shimerman, Joe Spano and Steve Vinovich.

== Characters ==
Juror #	1954 Studio One actor	1957 film actor	1997 film actor	2003 stage actor	2004 stage actor	2005 stage actor	2007 stage actor	2013 stage actor	2025 Bengali film actor	# to vote "not guilty"
1	Norman Fell	Martin Balsam	Courtney B. Vance	Steve Furst	Mark Blum	Rob Meldrum	George Wendt	Luke Shaw	Arjun Chakrabarty	9
The jury foreman, somewhat preoccupied with his duties; proves to be accommodating to others. An assistant high school football coach. Tends to attempt to prevent heated arguments. The ninth to vote "not guilty".
2	John Beal	John Fiedler	Ossie Davis	Ian Coppinger	Kevin Geer	George Kapiniaris	Todd Cerveris	David Calvitto	Suhotra Mukhopadhyay	5
A meek and unpretentious bank clerk who is at first domineered by others but finds his voice as the discussion goes on. The fifth to vote "not guilty".
3	Franchot Tone	Lee J. Cobb	George C. Scott	Stephen Frost	Philip Bosco / Robert Foxworth	Shane Bourne	Randle Mell	Jeff Fahey	Kaushik Ganguly	12
A businessman and distraught father, opinionated and stubborn with a temper; the main antagonist. The twelfth to vote "not guilty".
4	Walter Abel	E. G. Marshall	Armin Mueller-Stahl	Bill Bailey	James Rebhorn	Peter Phelps	Jeffrey Hayenga	Paul Antony-Barber	Kaushik Sen	11
A rational stockbroker, unflappable, calm, and analytical. He remains among the most neutral of the jurors, examining the case through facts and not bias. The eleventh to vote "not guilty".
5	Lee Philips	Jack Klugman	Dorian Harewood	Jeff Green	Michael Mastro	Nicholas Papademetriou	Jim Saltouros	Ed Franklin	Rahul Banerjee (actor)	3
A soft-spoken paramedic from a violent slum, traditionally the youngest juror. The third to vote "not guilty".
6	Bart Burns	Edward Binns	James Gandolfini	Dave Johns	Robert Clohessy	Peter Flett	Charles Borland	Robert Blythe	Kanchan Mullick	6
A house painter, tough but principled and respectful. The sixth to vote "not guilty".
7	Paul Hartman	Jack Warden	Tony Danza	David Calvitto	John Pankow	Aaron Blabey	Mark Morettini	Nick Moran, Sean Power	Sauraseni Maitra	7
A wisecracking salesman, sports fan, seemingly indifferent to the deliberations. The seventh to vote "not guilty".
8	Robert Cummings	Henry Fonda	Jack Lemmon	Owen O'Neill	Boyd Gaines	Marcus Graham	Richard Thomas	Martin Shaw, Tom Conti	Parambrata Chatterjee	1
An architect, the first dissenter and protagonist. Identified as "Davis" at the end.
9	Joseph Sweeney	Joseph Sweeney	Hume Cronyn	Russell Hunter	Tom Aldredge	Henri Szeps	Alan Mandell	Robert Vaughn	Phalguni Chatterjee	2
A wise and observant elderly man. Identified as "McCardle" at the end. The second to vote "not guilty".
10	Edward Arnold	Ed Begley	Mykelti Williamson	Phil Nichol	Peter Friedman	Richard Piper	Julian Gamble	Miles Richardson, William Gaminara	Ritwick Chakraborty	10
A garage owner; a pushy and loudmouthed bigot. The tenth to vote "not guilty".
11	George Voskovec	George Voskovec	Edward James Olmos	Andy Smart	Larry Bryggman / Byron Loquon	Alex Menglet	David Lively	Martin Turner	Anirban Chakrabarti	4
A thoughtful immigrant watchmaker and naturalized American citizen who demonstrates strong patriotic pride. The fourth to vote "not guilty".
12	Will West	Robert Webber	William Petersen	Gavin Robertson	Adam Trese	Russell Fletcher	Craig Wroe	Owen O'Neill, Robert Duncan	Ananya Chatterjee	8
An indecisive advertising executive who is easily swayed by the others. Originally the eighth to vote "not guilty" before changing back and forth three times.

The cast of the 2007 Russian film adaptation, 12, directed by Nikita Michalkov:

- Sergei Makovetsky – Juror No. 1
- Nikita Mikhalkov – Juror No. 2
- Sergei Garmash – Juror No. 3
- Valentin Gaft – Juror No. 4
- Alexei Petrenko – Juror No. 5
- Yuri Stoyanov – Juror No. 6
- Sergei Gazarov – Juror No. 7
- Mikhail Yefremov – Juror No. 8
- Alexey Gorbunov – Juror No. 9
- Sergei Artsibashev – Juror No. 10
- Viktor Verzhbitsky – Juror No. 11
- Roman Madyanov – Juror No. 12
- Alexander Adabashyan – Bailiff
- Apti Magamayev – Chechen boy
