= Independent Theatre Pakistan =

Pakistani theater company founded 2012

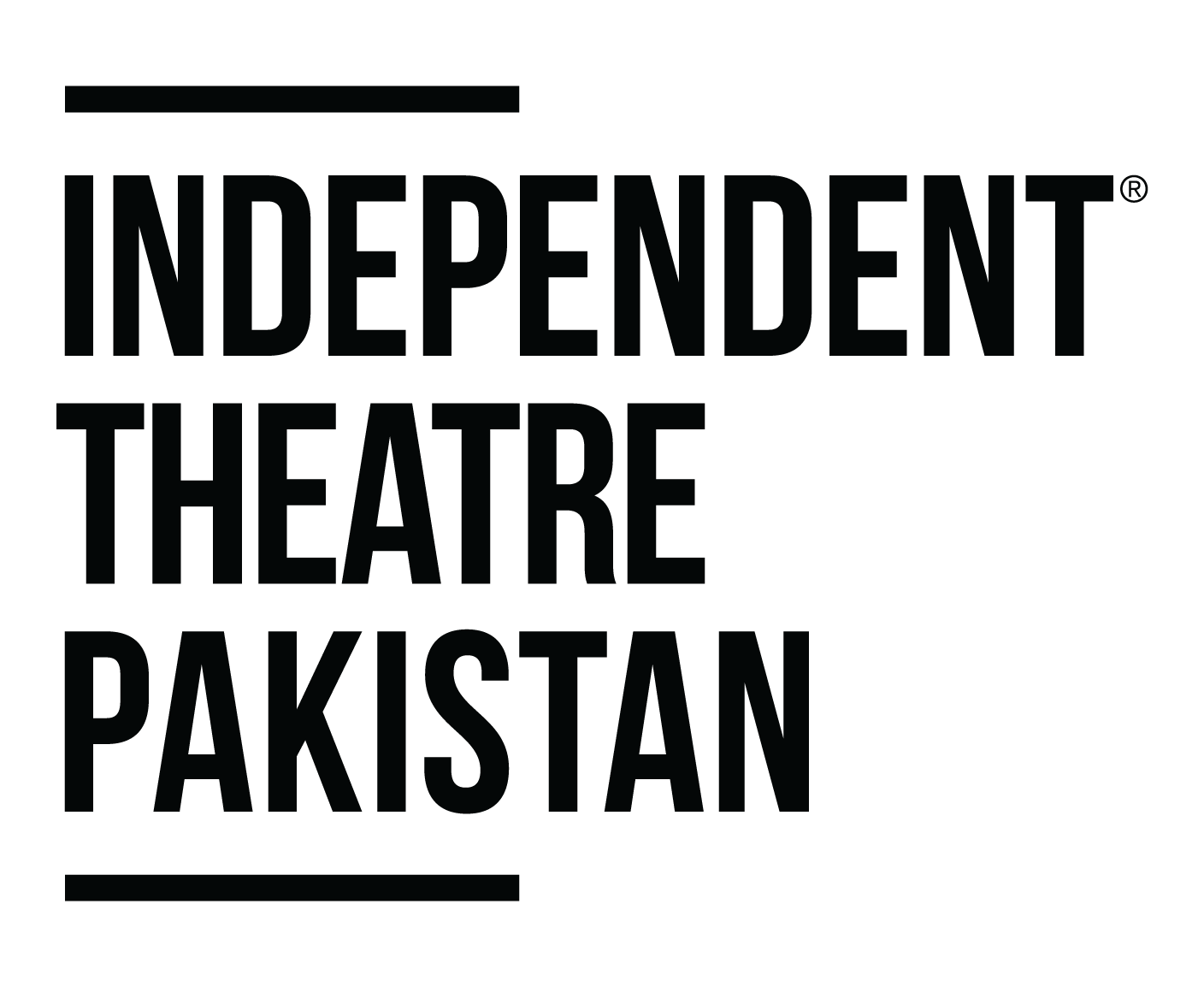
- Type: Performing arts organization
- Industry: Entertainment
- Genre: Urdu and English plays, storytelling, musicals, theatre education, promotion of literature and theatre both professionally and in the community
- Founded: 23 March 2012; 14 years ago
- Founder: Azeem Hamid
- Headquarters: Lahore, Punjab, Pakistan
- Area served: Pakistan
- Key people: Azeem Hamid
- Website: independenttheatrepk.com

Independent Theatre Pakistan (often abbreviated to ITP) is a Pakistani theatre company and performing arts organization based in Lahore, Punjab, established in March 2012. The group is founded by writer and director Azeem Hamid. It is the youngest theatre company in continuous production to have performed both internationally and domestically from Pakistan. Since their inception, the group has performed over twenty-five theatrical productions.

The group primarily performs in Urdu language but has also done theatrical productions in English and Punjabi languages. They have extensively focused on the revival of Urdu literature in Pakistan. Independent Theatre Pakistan aims to work for the development of youth in Pakistan through the creative and performing arts.

Independent Theatre Pakistan have produced original theatrical productions such as Awaaz (literal translation: Voice), a psychological thriller play and the satirical short-play Kuttay (literal translation: Dogs). Also, they have adapted the works of progressive South Asian writers like Saadat Hassan Manto, Rajinder Singh Bedi, Krishan Chander, Imtiaz Ali Taj, Ashfaq Ahmed and Meerza Adeeb.

== History ==
=== Formation (2012) ===
Zara Peerzada as "Saugandi" in Manto's Hatak (Insult) directed by Azeem Hamid at Alhamra Arts Council, Lahore, in 2012

The company was founded in 2012 by Azeem Hamid and Danyaal Syed and now operates all across theatres in Lahore: Alhamra Arts Council and Ali Auditorium (for classical Urdu & Broadway plays and musicals) and different educational institutes (for theatre workshops & short plays).

Their first theatrical production Hatak (literal meaning: Insult), featured fashion model and actress Zara Peerzada in the lead role, was based on the short-story of famous Urdu writer Saadat Hassan Manto, staged in November 2012 at Alhamra Arts Council and received positive reviews from critics. This was followed by the group collaborating with Beaconhouse School Liberty for a theatrical performance Dareecha, based loosely on the writings of the play Qurtaba Ka Qazi written by Imtiaz Ali Taj.

=== Early years (2013) ===
In 2013, the group initiated their year with two short-length plays; Dastak (The Knock), a play written by Meerza Adeeb and an original, Awaaz (Voice), in collaboration with Lahore Grammar School, the latter winning two-awards at Colors & Humour 2013 for the best actress & supporting actor roles. This success was later followed by a sold-out performance of Ashfaq Ahmed's tele-play stage adaptation Fehmida Ki Kahani, Ustaani Rahat Ki Zubani in March, the performance was praised by many literature writers including Ayub Khawar. The group went on to perform Rajinder Singh Bedi's classical satire Naql-e-Makani (Moving to a New House) from 4th till 6 October, which was well received by critics and the audiences. In the same month, Azeem Hamid directed Kuttay, a satirical performance based on the writings of Nadeem F. Paracha's article Dog Gone as a mock to society. The performance won the Imtiaz Ali Taj award at a festival held in Lahore, Pakistan.

=== International success (2014–2015) ===
The following year, it produced several performances, which included Jhelum Mein Naupar (The Sailing Boat in Jhelum) featuring stage actress Amtul Baweja and an adaptation of Reginald Rose's famous film Twelve Angry Men as Twelve Angry Jurors at different venues in Lahore. In summers, the group went on their first international tour at the 2nd International SPIC MACAY Convention held in Chennai, Madras, India where they collaborated with Koodiyattam master Margi Madhu from the Chakyar clan for the classical Sanskrit theatre performance of Anguliyankam (The Golden Ring) in June 2014.

Manto's Kamra #9 (Room No. 9) directed by Azeem Hamid at Alhamra Arts Council, Lahore, in 2014. Visible from left to right: Faizan Naveed as "Nasir", Namwar Ayaz as "Zamaan" and Zoya Uzair as "Shireen".

In December, the company went on to produce their best known theatrical performance Kamra No. 9 (Room No. 9) a radio play written by Saadat Hasan Manto and directed by Azeem Hamid. The performance was well received by critics and audiences, the Daily Times wrote "Kamra #9 ... mystery musical is an example of Urdu theatre at its finest." Shoaib Ahmed of Dawn wrote "The 60-minute three-act play had such a strong production value that it kept glued the audience to their seats till the end. The literary piece was deeply and meaningfully tailored for the play.", while during an interview to The Express Tribune, director Azeem Hamid said, "Visualising and creating a 1930s Delhi feel for a radio play was an immense challenge; we walked around Jalander, India to get inspiration for Kamra #9's set design." The Mani-Nama blog reviewed the performance saying, "The set was quite modest- a realistic one with an old radio, telephone and chairs. After sometime I witnessed some quality lighting which was done by Shakeel Siddique, who literally set the pace of play with classic lights." and The News on Sunday wrote, "Kamra #9 provided insight into human complexities." Aleeza Rasool, writer and critic, of Youlin Magazine reported praising the performance as she wrote, "Firstly, a radio play by Manto was a refreshing choice, for it is one of the lesser-known genres that Manto composed during his brief lifetime. Secondly, the play was very well-acted, and most importantly, the direction was even-tempered, making the play engaging.", adding that, "It is unusual to come across the genus of anticipation and suspense in Pakistani stage plays, which is why Azeem Hamid, actor and director of the play, deserves a pat on the back for putting up a wonderful performance on Manto's radio play."

After the success in Pakistan, the company went on to perform Kamra No. 9 in West Bengal, India to promote peace between the two bordering nations. During an interview with The Telegraph, "For the past few years, the theatre and cultural activists have been protesting in various ways against fanaticism, trying their best to educate people in rural areas, organising workshops in schools and colleges and staging street theatres. We were hopeful that a peaceful atmosphere would gradually emerge. The Peshawar killings have come as an eye-opener", Zoya Uzair, who played the lead role of 'Shireen', said. The company's director Azeem Hamid received an 'Address of Honour' from MLA Ajoy Dey of the Santipur Municipality for staging and directing Kamra No. 9 in West Bengal.

Rashid Mehmood starred as "Fakir" alongside Shafaq Yousuf as "Munni" in Sammi Di Vaar staged in Lahore, 2015.

In 2015, director Azeem Hamid said in an interview to My Awesome Journey that "I decided to revamp ITP. I had been scouting a team of professionals that would be useful in creating intelligent theatre." The company supported 'The End Polio Now' campaign organized by Rotary International at Alhamra Arts Council, Lahore and performed an original monologue Scream at the event. In December, the group produced a set of three theatrical performances, 3 Kahaniyan (Three Stories) which featured Bu (Odour) an original play written by University of Regina graduate Ayesha Mohsin having previously worked with CJTR-FM, a Punjabi language play Sammi Di Vaar (Sammi's Life) written by Najm Hosain Syed and directed by Mehreen Mir from Royal Academy of Dramatic Arts, London which featured famous Pakistani film actor Rashid Mehmood, and a stage adaptation of Saadat Hasan Manto's short-story Badshahat Ka Khatma (Kingdom's End) by Azeem Hamid. The Pakistan Today reported that 3 Kahaniyan received a mixed reception from critics, while Faizan Javed of The Nation praised the performance writing "The immediate response of the audience determines the quality of play being stage. And when it comes to social message for the audience the impact is everlasting. The play 3 Kahaniyan being staged at Alhamra Hall on Mall Road is an example."

=== Rise to fame (2016) ===
In March, the company produced the theatrical adaptation of Neil Simon's farcical play Rumors, which was praised and supported by well known celebrities and film stars like Agha Ali, Cybil Chowdhry, Poonam Anwar, Rachel Gill and comedian Ali Sufian Wasif. The performance was a sold-out show. Soon after, team members from the company participated and lead a delegation to 4th International Convention of SPIC MACAY held in IIT Guwahati, Assam, India. In September, University of Veterinary and Animal Sciences hosted a three-days theatrical workshops program called 'Dramaship', which featured lectures from the group team members including Azeem Hamid and Faiz Rasool. The objective of the workshop focused to gather talented students at a single platform and develop their theatrical skills so that they can explore and learn basic concepts of theatre in a new medium to translate their expression.

On 20 October, Hamid announced that the company will be directing and producing three full-length comedy theatrical performances which includes Arsenic and Old Lace, Run for Your Wife and Around the World in 80 Days. In an interview with Daily Pakistan, "I’m excited and looking forward to November. Rehearsals are in full swing at the Lahore Grammar School Gulberg these days, and after that we will be moving on to The City School. It is going to be a dream come true for theatre lovers, as we keep on working towards the revival of theatre culture in Pakistan", said Azeem Hamid, creative director of the company. The Nation reported that the company will be presenting Joseph Kesselring's famous black comedy Arsenic and Old Lace on 19 November in Lahore, Pakistan.

On 25 November, Sana Gilani from the Daily Pakistan published, a review of the performance Arsenic and Old Lace staged on 19 November, saying "Independent Theatre put forth an amazingly hilarious play" while adding that "Azeem Hamid of Independent Theatre Pakistan put his best foot forward and directed the play's adaptation." A week later, Faiz Rasool directed a re-enactment of a comedy by Ray Cooney, which received applause and appreciation from the audiences and critics, Daily Pakistan reported calling the play a remarkable success and saying, "Run For Your Wife on the 26th and 27th of November, 2016; with a full-house for both days... Jam-packed audiences were delving deeply into the story, and the suspense & humour was one to not have missed."

In December, the group founded the ASSITEJ Pakistan National Center in alliance with professionals involved in theatre for children and young people in Pakistan, with the aim of hosting a performing arts festival the following year in Lahore.

=== Continued success (2017–2018) ===
The Odd Couple directed by Azeem Hamid at Ali Auditorium, Lahore, in 2017. Visible from left to right: Akash Mufti as "Oscar Madison", Sofiya Khan and Wajeeha Javaid as "Cecily and Gwendolyn Pigeon" with Ali Sultan as "Felix Ungar".

Independent Theatre Pakistan team announced that they will be hosting and organizing the biggest children's performing arts festival, Tamasha Festival, to be held on 7, 8 and 9 April at Alhamra Arts Council, in Lahore, Pakistan. On 7 April, Dawn reported during the opening of the festivity that "The festival presents theatre performances for young, training workshops from upcoming directors, master workshops from international trainers for local artists and discussion sessions for general public." While Faizan Javed from The Nation reportedly said "The opening ceremony was attended by special guests and people from the theatre and performing arts such as Salima Hashmi, Bina Jawaad and Information, Culture and Youth Affairs Minister Mujtaba Shuja-ur-Rehman as honorable chief guest." Salima Hashmi in an interview with The Nation in regards to the festivity said, "When I first performed in Alhamra there was no fancy set, props and sound system. There was nothing but a garden with a hut. But then it was a significant experience in my life and I learnt a great deal from it. We should appreciate the young talent because these young people are our future".

The Nation newspaper reported on the second day of Tamasha Festival, saying "thought provoking panel discussions explored the creativity to entertain and educate children...What's theatre for children? One of the most interesting sessions was with Asaya Fujita and Sue Giles. Moderated by Sarah Zahid the discussion among panelists was remarkable. The session held at Alhamra Arts Council – Hall 1, highlighted the importance of theatre and arts for children. Director of Polyglot Theatre, Sue Giles said that through theatre, we achieve an opportunity to present space and time to subjective experience and nourish the child's brain power. "The idea of 'value for money' is another issue how people perceive the place and power of children in our midst. We neglect our children's physical freedoms we once had," Sue added. While the session 'Society and Drama' highlighted the issues of theatre industry in both countries Pakistan and Korea. The session was moderated by Azeem Hamid and the panelists were renowned writer Asghar Nadeem Syed and Seok Hong-Kim."

On 19 May, the company produced the theatrical adaptations of Jules Verne's Around the World in 80 Days and William Shakespeare's Julius Caesar, directed by Syed Shabee-ul-Hassan. This was followed by successful theatrical performances of The Odd Couple by Neil Simon with direction from Azeem Hamid, and Lend Me a Tenor by Ken Ludwig co-directed by Zoya Yalmaz and Noor-ul-Huda in November, 2017.

In Spring 2018, the group directed and produced Macbeth by William Shakespeare, an adaptation of The Wizard of Oz by L. Frank Baum and Pirates of the Currybean, a children's musical adaptation of Pirates of the Caribbean, by Craig Hawes. On 12 May, Independent Theatre Pakistan collaborated with the Harsukh School of Performing Arts, Rearts and Bina Jawwad to produce the musical performance Rang-e-Kainat (The Universe of Colours) held at Beaconhouse Newlands, Lahore. The performance also featured Harsakhian, a classical folk all female troupe, which included Ismet Jawwad, Saleema Jawwad and Zainub Jawwad. In October 2018, Zainab Muzaffar alongside Noor-ul-Huda directed The Female Odd Couple written by Neil Simon, held at Ali Auditorium.

=== Theatre for young audiences (2019–2020) ===
On 15 November, the company produced the theatrical adaptation of Mumtaz Mufti's play Nizaam Sakka (Water Carrier) in collaboration with Lahore Grammar School, directed by Noorulain Basit and Zainab Muzaffar with choreography by Gillian Georgine Rhodes.

In July 2020, Diva Magazine posted a list of 10 Contemporary theatre plays which featured the group's 2018 production 3 Kahaniyan (Three Stories), saying "A play that explored three different stories as the name suggest, 3 Kahaniyan by The Independent Theatre Pakistan, was one we couldn't get enough of. Beautifully divided into three acts and written by three playwrights told stories that the audience just loved every moment of."

== Educational programming ==
Independent Theatre Pakistan theatrical workshops use the art of acting and storytelling as a model for creative thinking in general. The company's director, Azeem Hamid in a radio interview to Fifi Haroon from BBC Urdu said, "Teaching creative expressions like theatre play an important role in building confidence skills, enhancing leadership qualities and empowering empathy to children. Storytelling methods and techniques are very vital to teach a subject much more creatively to a student." The group have collaborated extensively with leading private as well as public educational institutions such as Lahore Grammar School, The City School, Beaconhouse School System, Beaconhouse National University, Learning Alliance, Institute of Business Administration, Karachi and non-for-profit organizations like Rabtt to promote theatre and literature in Pakistan.

The group have also worked with Justice Project Pakistan, a non-for-profit organization, campaigning to raise awareness on the fundamental rights of ordinary citizens living in Pakistan with a series of flash performances across the streets of Lahore.

The company members were featured in a documentary aired on the television show Kahani Pakistani of Voice of America Urdu, hosted by Ayesha Gilani, where they talked about "The importance of theatre and how the art of performing arts is a reflection of our lives in Pakistan." in January 2016. The company continues to offer several week-long workshops and classes to individuals who wish to excel in theatre production, performance and education; providing a platform for young aspiring Pakistani artists to excel in their creative pursuits. Azeem Hamid in an interview with My Voice Unheard said, "Currently, we are doing extensive research on the performing arts culture in Pakistan. We are carrying out an innovative, youth centered theatrical program and ingenious curriculum across the nation.", adding, "Our productions focus on Pakistani values with a spotlight on creating cross cultural dialogue through means of creative expression."

As part of ASSITEJ Pakistan National Centre, the company hosted and organized the 7th edition of the annual ASSITEJ Asia Meeting which was held at Lahore from 6–7 April 2017. This was followed by organizing the Tamasha Festival which showcased 8 theatre, dance and music performances by professional groups, 21 theatre performances by schools and 10 performing arts workshops for children and young audience with 8 discussion sessions about performing arts and theatre for children and young audience with well-known performing arts personalities. In March 2018, the organisation hosted the first ASSITEJ Next Generation program, a performing arts residency, in Lahore, Pakistan, "to unite young theatre artists from all over the world for an open exchange of ideas and perspectives."

== Productions ==
Independent Theatre Pakistan has staged several full length and short length plays in Urdu, English, Hindi and Punjabi languages.

- 2012: Heer Ranjha, by Waris Shah
- 2012: Hatak, by Saadat Hassan Manto
- 2012: Dareecha, by Imtiaz Ali Taj
- 2013: Awaaz, by Azeem Hamid
- 2013: Dastak, by Meerza Adeeb
- 2013: Fehmida Ki Kahani, Ustaani Rahat Ki Zubani, by Ashfaq Ahmed
- 2013: Kuttay, by Azeem Hamid
- 2013: Naql-e-Makani, by Rajinder Singh Bedi
- 2014: Jhelum Mein Naupar, by Krishan Chander
- 2014: Twelve Angry Jurors, by Reginald Rose
- 2014: Anguliyankam (Single Act from Ascharya Choodamani), by Sakthibhadra
- 2014: Kamra No. 9, by Saadat Hassan Manto
- 2015: Scream, by Mehreen Abid Mir
- 2015: Aao Baat Tu Suno, by Saadat Hassan Manto
- 2015: 3 Kahaniyan (Bu, Sammi Di Vaar, Badshahat Ka Khatma), by Ayesha Mohsin, Najm Hosain Syed and Azeem Hamid
- 2016: Rumors, by Neil Simon
- 2016: Koi Bhi, Kahin Bhi, Kisi Bhi Waqt, by Mehreen Abid Mir
- 2016: Arsenic and Old Lace, by Joseph Kesselring
- 2016: Run for Your Wife, by Ray Cooney
- 2017: Julius Caesar, by William Shakespeare
- 2017: Around the World in 80 Days, by Jules Verne
- 2017: The Odd Couple, by Neil Simon
- 2017: Lend Me a Tenor, by Ken Ludwig
- 2018: Macbeth, by William Shakespeare
- 2018: The Wizard of Oz, by L. Frank Baum
- 2018: Pirates of the Currybean, by Craig Hawes
- 2018: Rang-e-Kainat, by Bina Jawwad
- 2018: The Female Odd Couple, by Neil Simon
- 2019: Nizaam Sakka, by Mumtaz Mufti

== Awards and accolades ==
Independent Theatre Pakistan won the "Best Supporting Role" and "Best Actor" awards at the Lahore Grammar School's Colors & Humor festival in Lahore in 2013. The company won the "Imtiaz Ali Taj" award for their performance Kuttay in Lahore followed by winning "Best Play" and "Best Actor" awards at the BNU Bestival 2014. The company's first international award came with the performance of Kamra #9 (Room No. 9) at Rangapeeth Natyamela held in December 2014, in West Bengal, India. They have also been awarded for their contribution towards peace by MLA Ajoy Dey of the Santipur Municipality. The organisation was part of the Developing Inclusive and Creative Economies (DICE) fellowship program in 2019, hosted and organised by British Council Pakistan.

== See also ==
- Theatre of Pakistan
