= Independent Theatre (disambiguation) =

Independent Theatre was an Australian dramatic society founded in Sydney in 1930, and is now the name of the venue it used.

Independent Theatre may also refer to:

- Independent Theatre (Adelaide), a theatre company based in Adelaide, South Australia
- Independent Theatre Pakistan, a Pakistani theatre company
- Independent Theatre Society, subscription-only organisation in London from 1891 to 1897
