= Rumors (play) =

Play by Neil Simon

- Original language: English
- Written by: Neil Simon
- Genre: Dark comedy Farce

Premiere
- Date: September 22, 1988
- Place: Old Globe Theatre; San Diego, California

Rumors is a farcical play by Neil Simon that premiered in 1988.

== Plot summary ==
=== Act I ===
Attorneys Ken and Chris Gorman, close friends of Charley Brock, the Deputy Mayor of New York, and his wife, Myra, have arrived at the Brocks' residence for their 10th wedding anniversary party to find that all the servants are gone, Myra is missing, and Charley has shot himself in the head in his bedroom. Chris calls Charley's doctor, but before Chris can tell him what happened, Ken discovers that the bullet only went through Charley's earlobe and orders Chris not to tell the doctor anything. Before they can get an explanation from Charley, the doorbell rings, announcing the arrival of Charley's accountant, Lenny Ganz, and his wife, Claire. Lenny and Claire have just been in a car accident, leaving Lenny with a severe case of whiplash. While Ken and Chris attempt to cover up their hosts' absence, Claire and Lenny exchange rumors that either Charley or Myra is having an affair, though they cannot agree on which.

Lenny confronts Ken about his suspicious behavior, and Ken admits to the couple that Charley has attempted suicide and Myra is missing. He discovered Charley in bed with a bottle of Valium and assumes that Charley was falling asleep when he fired the gun, missing his head but hitting his earlobe. Claire additionally notices a small bloodstain on Ken's shirt. Wanting to avoid a scandal, Ken argues with Lenny against calling the police. Before they can agree on anything, another car arrives at the house. The two couples agree not to tell the new arrivals what has happened. Ken reenters Charley's bedroom, and Claire opens the door to let in Ernie Cusack, Charley's psychologist, and his wife Cookie, who has chronic back pain and hosts a cooking show on television. Claire, Chris, and Lenny engage the Cusacks in conversation, but Ernie deduces that they are hiding something. Chris lies that the guests have decided to surprise Charley and Myra by preparing the party without any servants. Though not fully convinced, Cookie agrees to cook dinner herself.

Suddenly, a gunshot is heard in Charley's bedroom, and Ken briefly exits it in distress to request Chris's presence. Claire distracts the Cusacks while Lenny and Chris ascertain that Ken tripped while confiscating Charley's pistol, firing it off close to his head and leaving him mostly deaf. As the Cusacks prepare dinner and the others conspire to cover up what happened, the final guests arrive: Glenn Cooper, a politician running for State Senate, and his socialite wife Cassie. The two are in a midst of an argument over an alleged affair Glenn is having with another woman until Cassie furiously locks herself in the bathroom with a crystal. As the other guests filter back into the drawing room, the Brocks' mutual friends Harry and Joan call the house from Venezuela. The telephone is passed around haphazardly until it ends up with Ken, who is still unable to hear. As the Cusacks exit the kitchen with dinner prepared, Cassie screams at Glenn for causing her to drop her crystal in the toilet, Chris trips on the telephone cord, Lenny's neck twinges, Cookie's back spasms, and Ken hopelessly attempts to answer the phone.

=== Act II ===
As the guests finish dinner, the Cusacks and the Coopers have finally been informed about the situation with Charley and Myra. Ken's hearing is slowly recovering, but he has missed most of the conversation. The guests debate how best to handle their predicament until Cassie, still upset, shamelessly flirts with Lenny in an attempt to make Glenn jealous. They are interrupted by Charley, who calls from his room to inform the group that he is feeling better but needs more time to think. Ken remains bewildered until Glenn yells into his ear, which instantly cures Ken's deafness. Cassie continues flirting until Glenn hauls her outside, at which point Chris deduces that Myra is the one having the affair with Glenn while working on his campaign. An unknown woman then calls the house asking for Glenn, but the guests are unable to determine if it is Myra. Suddenly, a police car arrives at the house, and Glenn runs back in with a bloody nose after Cassie struck him with Lenny's car phone. While Glenn takes the call from the unknown woman, the guests decide to pretend that they hadn't heard any gunshots due to their music. Ken decides one of the men should impersonate Charley in case the police want to speak to him. Lenny is unwillingly assigned the role and begrudgingly retires to Charley's room.

Two police officers, Welch and Pudney, enter the house and ask to speak to Charley. Ken fields the questions, demanding to know what the police are responding to while the others offer their own unconvincing explanations. Officer Welch eventually reveals that he is investigating Lenny's car accident, as the car that struck his was a stolen Porsche that Myra had bought Charley as an anniversary gift. Ken convinces the officers to give the guests a minute alone by invoking attorney-client privilege, then tells the group that someone now has to impersonate Lenny. The wives draw lots for their husbands, and Ken is assigned the role, to his chagrin. The police reenter, but before Welch can interrogate Ken as Lenny, Pudney receives a notice that the stolen Porsche has been located and the thief arrested. The officers call off the investigation, but as they leave, Glenn accidentally mentions the gunshots. Pudney then receives a second notice that two gunshots were reported from within the Brocks' house.

Welch orders that Cassie be brought inside, then notices the blood on Ken and Glenn's shirts. He furiously informs the guests that he does not believe anything he has heard so far, and demands to see Charley, suspecting that he has been murdered. Out of excuses, the men agree to ask "Charley" to come down and explain everything. Lenny, disguised as Charley with a bandaged ear, exits Charley's room and frenetically improvises a long and rambling explanation for the night's events: Charley shot his ear in a frightened confrontation with one of their cooks, then accidentally locked an unconscious Myra in the basement before passing out from a dose of Valium. Welch accepts the story, partly out of exasperation, and the officers leave the house. The guests are elated and toast to Lenny, while the Coopers reconcile over Lenny's romanticized version of the Brocks' marriage. Charley calls again and asks the guests to come see him so he can explain everything, but as they walk upstairs to his bedroom, there is a knock on the basement door. Myra demands to be let out, and the guests stare at Lenny in shock.

== Background ==
In an interview, Simon said: " 'I was going through some difficult times...I wanted to work, because work is always a cathartic process for me, and I thought it would be really good just to get into a comedy.' "

He noted that "This is completely different for me...It's unlike anything I've ever written. It's my first farce." In describing the play, he said "The play started with the idea of doing a farce...The next thing was to do it as an elegant farce, because the farces in Moliere's days were generally about wealthy people. These aren't extremely wealthy people, but they are well-to-do. So I decided to dress them in evening clothes. There was something about having them dressed in evening clothes that I thought was a nice counterpoint to the chaos that was happening in the play. And so I picked a reason for them to be dressed elegantly, and it was a 10th anniversary."

== Production history ==
Rumors premiered at the Old Globe Theatre (San Diego, California) on September 22, 1988.

Rumors opened on Broadway at the Broadhurst Theatre on November 17, 1988 and transferred to the Ethel Barrymore Theatre where it closed after 535 performances and eight previews. Directed by Gene Saks, the original cast included Mark Nelson, Lisa Banes, Christine Baranski, Andre Gregory, Ken Howard, Ron Leibman, Joyce Van Patten, and Jessica Walter. The scenery was by Tony Straiges, costumes by Joseph G. Aulisi, and lighting by Tharon Musser. The song "La Bamba" was required to be used in the play.

Veronica Hamel, Dick Latessa, Larry Linville, and Alice Playten were among the cast replacements throughout the run.

Baranski won the Tony Award for Best Performance by a Featured Actress in a Play, Joseph G. Aulisi was nominated for the Drama Desk Award for Outstanding Costume Design.

A reading was held in September 2013, directed by Kathleen Marshall and starring Martin Short, Matthew Broderick, Andrea Martin and Julie White, with the possibility of a Broadway production. In March 2016, Independent Theatre Pakistan mounted a production in Lahore, Pakistan.

A revival is set to open off-broadway in the Newman Mills Theater at the Robert W. Wilson MCC Theater Space on January 9, 2027 (with an official opening on January 25, 2027).The production will be directed by Zhailon Levington and feature two casts: from January 9 until February 28 it will star Lisa Rinna, Phaedra Parks, Stacey Rusch, and Dolores Catania, from March 2 until April 21 it will star Cynthia Bailey, Eileen Davidson, Carole Radziwill, and Candiace Dillard-Bassett.
