= Mark Morettini =

American actor (born 1962)

- Born: October 24, 1962 (age 63); Providence, Rhode Island
- Occupation: Actor
- Years active: 1992-present
- Spouse: Megan Schneid Morettini

Mark Morettini (born October 24, 1962) is an American actor. He is most known for the role of Correctional Officer Rizzo Green on the TV series Prison Break.

== Early life ==
Morettini was born in Providence, Rhode Island, but raised in East Providence. He started theater in college and moved to Chicago to continue his career, starring in various productions, as well as roles in movies.

== Personal life ==
At one point he lived in Lake Bluff, Illinois. He is the father of three children. He lives in New York City with his wife, Megan Schneid Morettini.

== Career ==
He toured with George Wendt and Richard Thomas in 12 Angry Men as Juror #7, for 2 "seasons". On Broadway he appeared in "Pal Joey" and "A View From The Bridge".

== Filmography ==
Year	Film	Role	Notes
1992	Mario and the Mob	Sal	TV movie
1992	Home Alone 2: Lost in New York	Arresting Cop in Central Park #2	
1996	Chain Reaction	Romano	
1997	ER	Lockhart	Episode: The Long Way Around
1996–1999	Early Edition	Desk Sergeant	6 episodes
1998	U.S. Marshals	Cop #1	
2002	Road to Perdition	Nitti Thug #5	(uncredited)
2005–2006	Prison Break	Correctional Officer Rizzo Green	10 episodes
2006	Let's Go to Prison	Bailiff	
2007	The Miracle	Baseball announcer	(voice)
2009	Law & Order	Jerry	Episode: Memo from the Dark Side
2010	The Good Wife	Court Clerk	Episode: Infamy
2013-15	Blue Bloods	Detective Powell/TARU Sheen	4 episodes
