= Run for Your Wife (play) =

1983 comedy play by Ray Cooney

- Original language: English language
- Written by: Ray Cooney
- Characters: John Smith
- Subject: Bigamy
- Genre: Farce

Premiere
- Date: 29 March 1983
- Place: England

Run for Your Wife is a 1983 comedy play by Ray Cooney.

== Plot ==
The story concerns bigamist John Smith, a London cab driver with two wives, two lives and a very precisely planned schedule for juggling them both, with one wife at a home in Streatham and another nearby at a home in Wimbledon.

Trouble brews when Smith is mugged and ends up in hospital, where both of his addresses surface, causing both the Streatham and Wimbledon police to investigate the case. His careful schedule upset, Smith becomes hopelessly entangled in his attempts to explain himself to his two wives and two suspicious police officers, with help from his lazy layabout neighbour upstairs in Wimbledon.

== Productions ==
Cast members have a precise schedule as well with many entrances and exits that create pressure and humour through this adult comedy.

=== London ===
Richard Briers and Bernard Cribbins took the lead roles in the original West End theatre production, though Robin Askwith took over the role of John Smith starting with the following year's run, and continued to play the role in various productions and tours for the next decade. It had a highly successful nine-year run in various theatres: Shaftesbury Theatre (March to December 1983), Criterion Theatre (December 1983 to March 1989), Whitehall Theatre (March 1989 to May 1990), Aldwych Theatre (May to September 1990) and Duchess Theatre (September 1990 to December 1991).

=== Original West End cast ===
- Richard Briers as John Smith
- Bernard Cribbins as Stanley Gardener
- Carol Hawkins as Mary Smith
- Helen Gill as Barbara Smith
- Peter Blake as DS Troughton
- Bill Pertwee as DS Porterhouse
- Sam Cox as Reporter
- Royce Mills as Bobby Franklyn

=== New York City ===
Run for Your Wife opened on Broadway at the Virginia Theatre on March 7, 1989, directed by and starring Ray Cooney himself as taxi driver John Smith, and featuring Kay Walbye as his Wimbledon wife, Hilary Labow as his Streatham wife, Gareth Hunt and Dennis Ramsden as the police sergeants, and Paxton Whitehead as Smith's friend and accomplice. The New York Times theater critic Mel Gussow called the play "burdened with blind alleys, limp jokes, forced puns and troubled entendres," the acting "as ordinary as John Smith is supposed to be" and the staging "mechanical, as characters watch one another watching." The production closed on April 9 after 14 previews and 52 regular performances.

=== Poland ===
The first Polish production of Run for Your Wife opened in Warsaw's Teatr Kwadrat in 1992 under the title Mayday, directed by Marcin Sławiński, and starring Wojciech Pokora. It has since had a successful run in other theatres across the country (for example in Koszalin's Baltic Dramatic Theater [Bałtycki Teatr Dramatyczny] in 2019), with several more productions directed by Pokora himself. A Polish production of Run for Your Wife called "Mayday" was also played.

=== Seoul ===
The South Korean production of Run for Your Wife, under the title Liar, has had an open run in Seoul since 1998, and it is considered one of the most successful performances in Korean theater history. Its sequel, Caught in the Net, also has had an open run in Seoul since 2004, under the title Liar 2.

=== Paris, France ===
Run For Your Wife opened at the Théâtre de la Michodière under the title Stationnement Alterné on 6 October 2005 and ran for 267 performances.
French adaptation : Stewart Vaughan and Jean-Christophe Barc
Director : Jean-Luc Moreau

==== Cast ====
- Eric Metayer as Jean Martin
- Roland Marchisio as Gilbert Jardinier
- Cécile Arnaud as Mathilde Martin
- Diana Frank as Charlotte Martin
- Daniel-Jean Colloredo as Inspecteur Treguier
- Gérard Caillaud as Inspecteur Pontarlier
- Laurent Montagner as the photographer
- Didier Constant as Claude Mareuil

The script is published by l'Avant-Scène Théâtre

=== Lahore ===
On 26 and 27 November 2016, the play was directed by Faiz Rasool from Independent Theatre Pakistan at Ali Auditorium, Lahore, Pakistan.

=== Shanghai, China ===
From May 13, 2021, Chinese edition of Run for Your Wife opened on XingKongJian NO.7. It is directed by Zhi Chen and Xingfei Chen. Until Oct 2021, the play has been on more than one hundred times.

==== Cast ====
- Hongyuan Cao, Chengyang Huang, Xingbao Li as John Smith
- Junyu Guo, Xinye Sun, Ziqiu Wu as Stanley Gardener
- Enyu Li, Yihan Liu, Mengyan Zhang as Mary Smith
- Xinyi Li, Yufan Wang, Jie Xu, Yiqi Xu, Xiaowan Yu as Barbara Smith
- Fangzhou Hu, Fangyi Zeng, Yunzhao Wu as Vincent
- Fangzhou Hu, Daqin Lin, Yinuo Tao, Tiancheng Yang as Harry
- Jiluo Duan, Daqin Lin, Chengyang Huang as Bobby Franklyn

=== Honduras ===
The play has been run twice by Circulo Teatral Sampedrano. In its first inception in September 1989, and for its second time in August 2024.

=== Films ===
In February 1998, Fox 2000 Pictures acquired the rights, beating out competing bids from Universal Pictures and DreamWorks Pictures, to Run for Your Wife as a possible project for director Harold Ramis.

A film adaptation of Run for Your Wife, co-directed by Ray Cooney and John Luton, was released on 14 February 2013, with both Briers and Cribbins appearing in cameo roles. Upon release the film was savaged by critics and has been referred to as one of the worst films of all time, after it grossed just £602 in its opening weekend at the British box office to its £900,000 budget.

A Polish film adaptation titled Mayday directed by Sam Akina was released in Poland on 10 January 2020. It opened to mixed reviews.'s

== Sequel ==
A sequel by Cooney entitled Caught in the Net premiered in London's West End in 2001. It deals mainly with the now teenaged children of John Smith's two families who find each other online.
