= Twelve Angry Men (1964 play) =

1964 play by Reginald Rose

- Original language: English
- Written by: Reginald Rose
- Based on: 12 Angry Men
- Subject: A courthouse drama: a boy's life at stake in the hands of the jury
- Genre: Drama
- Setting: 1954, late summer in a court jury room, New York City, New York

Premiere
- Date: 1964
- Place: Queen’s Theatre, London

Twelve Angry Men is a stage production of the 1957 film 12 Angry Men.

The play was adapted by Reginald Rose from his screenplay for the film. It premiered in London's West End in 1964, and debuted on Broadway on October 28, 2004 by the Roundabout Theatre Company at the American Airlines Theatre, where it ran for 328 performances.

== Productions ==
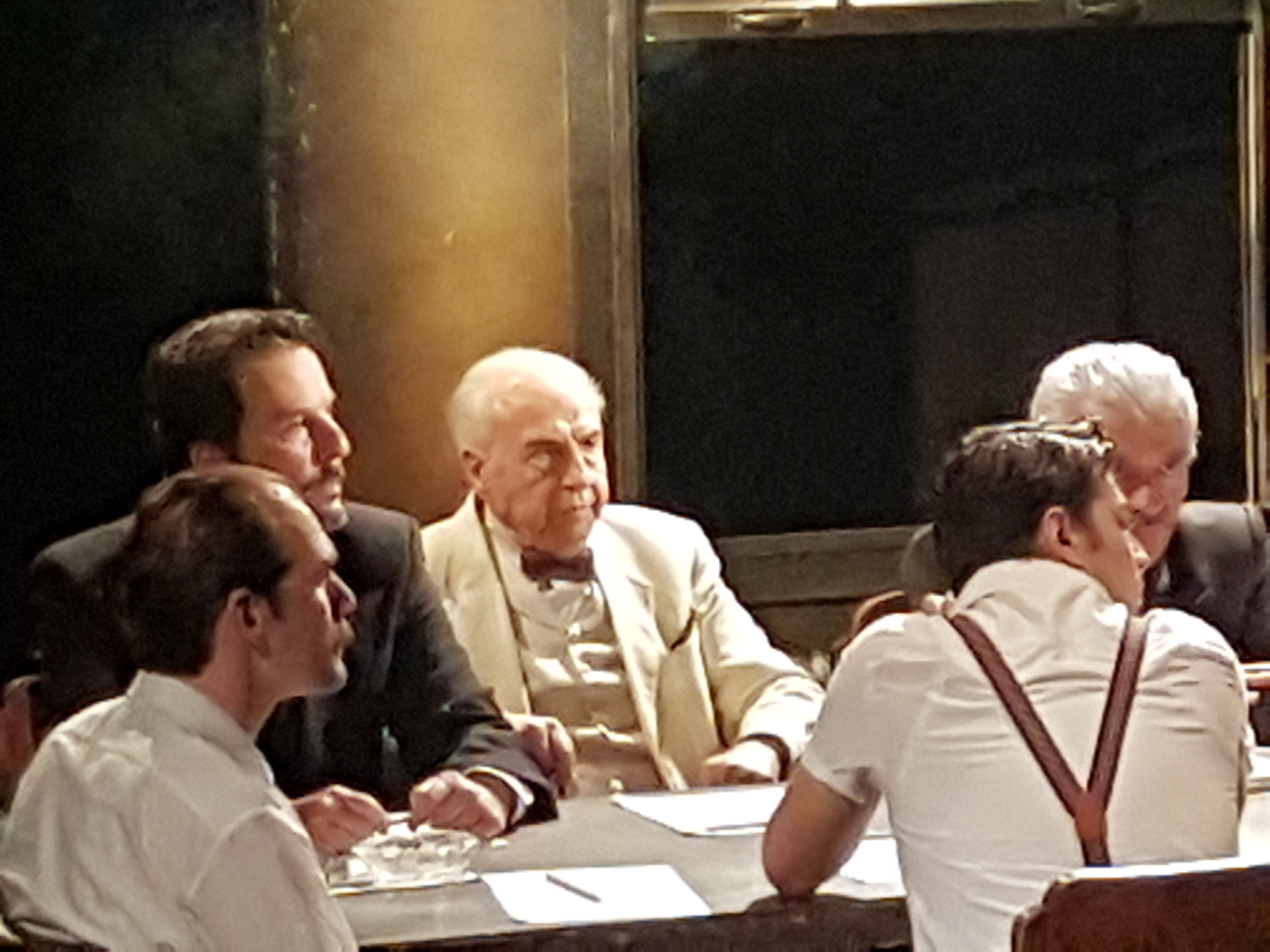
Twelve Angry Men performed at the Alkmini Theatre, Athens (2018)

Following the release of the film, the stage rights were sold, with Rose retaining the British and American commercial rights. His play made its London West End debut in 1964. Rose has revised the play several times, it was first published by Samuel French in 1965.

The stage rights for the teleplay had previously been licensed by Dramatic Publishing, which produced a version of the drama that premiered in 1955 and has been popular with amateur groups since then.

Rose planned a Broadway production for 1960, but it did not materialize. The play had a "little noted" production in 1960 at, according to Rose, a "new civic repertory theatre in New York."

Rose's play premiered in London in 1964 at the West End Queen’s Theatre. Leo Genn appeared in the production, which was directed by Margaret Webster, and also included Mark Kingston, Paul Maxwell, Arnold Ridley and Robert Urquhart in the cast.

Rose frequently revised the play.

Harold Pinter directed a production of the play, which opened at the Bristol Old Vic on March 7, 1996. With set design by Eileen Diss, lighting design by Mick Hughes, and costume design by Tom Rand, its cast included Stuart Rayner (Juror 1, Foreman), Kevin Dignam (Juror 2), Tony Haygarth (Juror 3), Timothy West (Juror 4), Maurice Kaufmann (Juror 5), Douglas McFerran (Juror 6), Tim Healy (Juror 7), Kevin Whately (Juror 8), Alan MacNaughtan (Juror 9), Peter Vaughan (Juror 10), Robert East (Juror 11), Christopher Simon (Juror 12), Joshua Losey (Guard), and E. G. Marshall, as the Voice of the Judge. Marshall had portrayed "#4" in Sidney Lumet's 1957 film version of the play. The production transferred to the Comedy Theatre in London the same year.

In 2003, the British producer/director Guy Masterson directed an all-comedian revival using the 1964 text at the Assembly Rooms including Bill Bailey as Juror 4, Phil Nichol as Juror 10, Owen O'Neill as Juror 8, Stephen Frost as Juror 3 and Russell Hunter as Juror 9 during the Edinburgh Fringe Festival which broke the existing box office record for drama at the Fringe Festival and garnered much critical acclaim.

The Roundabout Theatre Company presented a revised version of the play on Broadway in 2004, starring Boyd Gaines as a more combative Juror 8, with James Rebhorn (Juror 4), Philip Bosco (Juror 3), and Robert Prosky as the Voice of the Judge. Prosky had starred as "#3" in a Washington D.C. production of the show, opposite Roy Scheider as "#8" and Rene Auberjonois as "#5". In 2007, 12 Angry Men ran on a national theatre tour with Richard Thomas and George Wendt starring as Jurors No. 8 and No. 1, respectively. The 2008 tour did not include Wendt but featured Kevin Dobson, of Kojak and Knots Landing, as Juror No. 10.

Masterson directed an Australian version of his Edinburgh production in 2005, produced by Arts Projects Australia and Adrian Bohm, at QPAC Brisbane, Sydney Theatre and Melbourne Athenaeum including Shane Bourne as Juror 3, Peter Phelps as Juror 4, Marcus Graham as Juror 8, George Kapiniaris as Juror 2 and Henri Szeps as Juror 9. This production won three Melbourne Green Room Awards and a nomination for "Best Play" at the Helpmann Awards.

In 2005, L.A. Theatre Works presented a production of the play that was recorded and released in 2006 as an audiobook; directed by John de Lancie, the cast included Dan Castellaneta, Jeffrey Donovan, Héctor Elizondo, Robert Foxworth, James Gleason, Kevin Kilner, Richard Kind, Alan Mandell, Rob Nagle, Armin Shimerman, Joe Spano, and Steve Vinovich.

Another West End production opened in November 2013, and which was extended until June 2014, at the Garrick Theatre. Directed by Christopher Haydon, the cast included Martin Shaw, Robert Vaughn, Jeff Fahey, Nick Moran, Tom Conti, Robert Blythe, Miles Richardson and Martin Turner.

== Synopsis ==
The story begins after closing arguments have been presented in the capital murder case against a troubled teenager, who stands accused of killing his father with premeditation. The judge, heard but unseen, announces the instructions to an all-male (as traditionally staged) jury. As in most American criminal cases, the twelve men must unanimously decide on a verdict of "guilty" or "not guilty". (In the justice systems of nearly all American states, as in the case of New York State where the case is implied to be tried, failure to reach a unanimous verdict, a so-called "hung jury", results in a mistrial.) The jury is further instructed that a guilty verdict will be accompanied by a mandatory death sentence; the jury is then locked into the room until a verdict is reached. Adding to the tension, the weather is exceptionally hot and the lone fan in the room is broken.

As the jurors begin, they take a preliminary vote to assess the room. All the jurors vote guilty except one, Juror 8, who is leaning toward guilty but, acting on a hunch and a desire not to rush to judgment, votes not guilty. The jurors begin explaining why they came to their decisions, and though Juror 8 is unconvinced, he agrees to abstain from the next round of voting and change his vote to guilty if the others remain unanimous. With the next vote, Juror 9 flips, agreeing it should not be rushed.

The jurors begin assessing the evidence. The alleged murder weapon, a knife that was testified to be unique, turns out to be identical to one in Juror 8's possession, a common switchblade. One of the witnesses, a downstairs neighbor, claimed to have heard the defendant yell "I am going to kill you," a loud thud, then saw the defendant fleeing down the staircase of their shared apartment complex 15 seconds after the incident; an experiment shows that a man of his age and condition could not have possibly reached the staircase in a comparable amount of time, and furthermore, a passing train would have overwhelmed any sound the witness had heard beyond any clear identification. One by one, Jurors 5, 11, 2 and 6 flip to not guilty. Juror 7 soon follows, solely because he wants to get out in time for the Yankees game that evening; a thunderstorm soon rolls in, raining out the game and rendering that point moot.

Juror 4 points out the weakness of the defendant's alibi and failure to remember details during interrogation. Juror 8 quizzes Juror 4 on what he did the past several days to demonstrate that memory is fallible, especially under stress, also noting that the defendant did successfully recall the details at trial (to which the guilty voters point out that he could have been coached). Juror 5, who had a similar upbringing to the defendant and had experience with switchblades, demonstrates that it would have been impractical for a switchblade user, especially one shorter than the victim, to stab in the downward direction the stab wound was. Juror 12 flips along with the foreman.

Jurors 3, 4 and 10 remain in the guilty camp. Juror 4 remains convinced of the one remaining witness, a lady who testified seeing the crime by chance from across the street in her bed, temporarily convincing Juror 12 to flip back to guilty. Juror 10, in a tirade, admits he is voting guilty as an act of white supremacy and is ordered to keep silent. Juror 8 is initially unable to rebut this evidence until realizing that the witness normally wore glasses, which she would not have been wearing in bed, making it highly unlikely she actually saw the crime in sufficient detail to identify the perpetrator. Juror 4 flips, Juror 12 returns to not guilty, and Juror 10 begrudgingly casts a not guilty vote.

Juror 3, whose temper had increasingly flared throughout deliberations, is the last holdout. In an impassioned final plea, he vows to hang the jury and relates the crime to his own strained relationship with his son, then breaks down in tears. The other jurors remind him that the defendant is not his son, and he finally flips. The foreman delivers the not guilty verdict to the bailiff, the door unlocks and the jurors all leave, with Juror 8 helping Juror 3 with his coat.

== Characters ==
The characters are unnamed; throughout their deliberation, not a single juror calls another by his name, and they are identified in the script merely by number. The epilogue, not included in all productions, gives Jurors 8 and 9 names (Mr. Davis and Mr. McCardle, respectively).

== Awards and nominations ==
=== 2004 Broadway revival ===
Year	Award	Category	Nominee	Result
2005	Tony Award	Best Revival of a Play		Nominated
2005	Tony Award	Best Leading Actor in a Play	Philip Bosco	Nominated
2005	Tony Award	Best Direction of a Play	Scott Ellis	Nominated
2005	Drama Desk Award	Outstanding Revival of a Play		Won
2005	Drama Desk Award	Outstanding Featured Actor in a Play	Philip Bosco	Nominated
2005	Drama Desk Award	Outstanding Director of a Play	Scott Ellis	Nominated
2005	Outer Critics Circle Award	Outstanding Revival of a Play		Won
2005	Outer Critics Circle Award	Outstanding Featured Actor in a Play	Philip Bosco	Nominated
2005	Drama League Award	Distinguished Revival of a Play		Won

== See also ==
- Minority influence
