= Alan Mandell =

Canadian-American actor (1927–2026)

- Born: Albert Mandell; December 27, 1927; Toronto, Ontario, Canada
- Died: October 13, 2026 (aged 98); Los Angeles, California, U.S.
- Occupation: Actor

Alan Mandell (December 27, 1927 – October 13, 2026) was a Canadian-American actor best known for playing Rabbi Marshak in the Coen brothers' 2009 film A Serious Man. With several decades of experience as a stage actor, he was especially acclaimed as an interpreter of the works of Samuel Beckett.

== Life and career ==
Albert Mandell was born into a Jewish family in Toronto, Ontario, in 1927. He acted on stage in both Canada and the United States, building a reputation in San Francisco's theater scene in the 1950s. In 1968 he legally changed his given name to Alan to avoid being confused with noted mobster Albert Anastasia.

Mandell's association with Beckett began in 1957, with a production of Waiting for Godot at the San Francisco Actor's Workshop. He subsequently played Lucky in a production of Godot directed by Beckett himself.

Outside of Beckett, Mandell acted in productions of Harold Pinter's No Man's Land and Arthur Miller's The Price. In 2007 he appeared as Juror #9 in a Los Angeles production of Twelve Angry Men, directed by Scott Ellis and co-starring Richard Thomas and George Wendt.

Mandell died at his home in Westwood, Los Angeles, on October 13, 2026, at the age of 98.

== Filmography ==
=== Film ===
Year	Title	Role	Notes
1988	Illegally Yours	Juror #8	
1991	The Marrying Man	Murch	
1993	Midnight Witness	Shaw	
2001	Hedwig and the Angry Inch	Patron at Bar	Uncredited role
2006	Shortbus	Tobias, the Mayor	
2009	A Serious Man	Rabbi Marshak	
2013	Herblock: The Black & the White	Herbert Block	Documentary
2015	Addicted to Fresno	Arthur Lupka	
2019	Velvet Buzzsaw	Ventril Dease	

=== Television ===
Year	Title	Role	Notes
1974	Great Performances	District Police Inspector	Episode: "Enemies"
1975	The Invisible Man	Senator Baldwyn	Episode: "Man of Influence"
1975	Cannon	Billings	Episode: "Fall Guy"
1976	The Six Million Dollar Man	Technician	Episode: "The Secret of Bigfoot: Part 2 "
1976	Baretta	Assistant DA Merriman	Episode: "The Left Hand of the Devil"
1976	Baretta	Richmond	Episode: "Runway Cowboy"
1977	Man from Atlantis	Grant Stockwood	Episode: "The Death Scouts"
1978	79 Park Avenue	Dr. George Waldheim	TV miniseries
1978	Eight is Enough	unknown	Episode: "Cinderella's Understudy"
1980	Breaking Away	Pinball player	Episode: "Grand Illusion"
1991	Sisters	Owen Glendower	Episode: "One to Grow On"
2010	Grey's Anatomy	Henry Stamm	Episode: "Shiny Happy People"
