= Twelve Angry Men (1955 play) =

1955 play by Sherman L. Sergel

- Written by: Sherman L. Sergel
- Based on: "Twelve Angry Men"
- Subject: A courthouse drama: a boy's life at stake in the hands of the jury
- Genre: Drama
- Setting: A jury room, "the present", summer

Premiere
- Date: 1955
- Place: San Francisco, California

Twelve Angry Men is a 1955 play by Sherman L. Sergel, adapted from the 1954 teleplay of the same title by Reginald Rose for the CBS Studio One anthology television series. Versions of the play are often performed as Twelve Angry Jurors and Twelve Angry Women.

== History ==
Following the teleplay's broadcast, the stage rights to the teleplay were sought by the Dramatic Publishing Company, which was run by the Sergel family. Dramatic Publishing specialized in adapting works from other media to the stage and had previously licensed and adapted three of Rose's earlier teleplays, with the adaptations done by Kristen Sergel. Rose saw no market for a stage adaptation, and, needing money, sold the rights.

The play premiered December 9, 1955, at San Francisco's Marina Auditorium and was directed by Leon Forbes. Following the release of the 1957 film 12 Angry Men, for which Rose wrote the screenplay, the rights were commercially licensed, with Rose retaining the American and British theatrical rights himself. While it was several years until Rose's version of the play debuted, Sergel's version continued to be performed by amateurs.

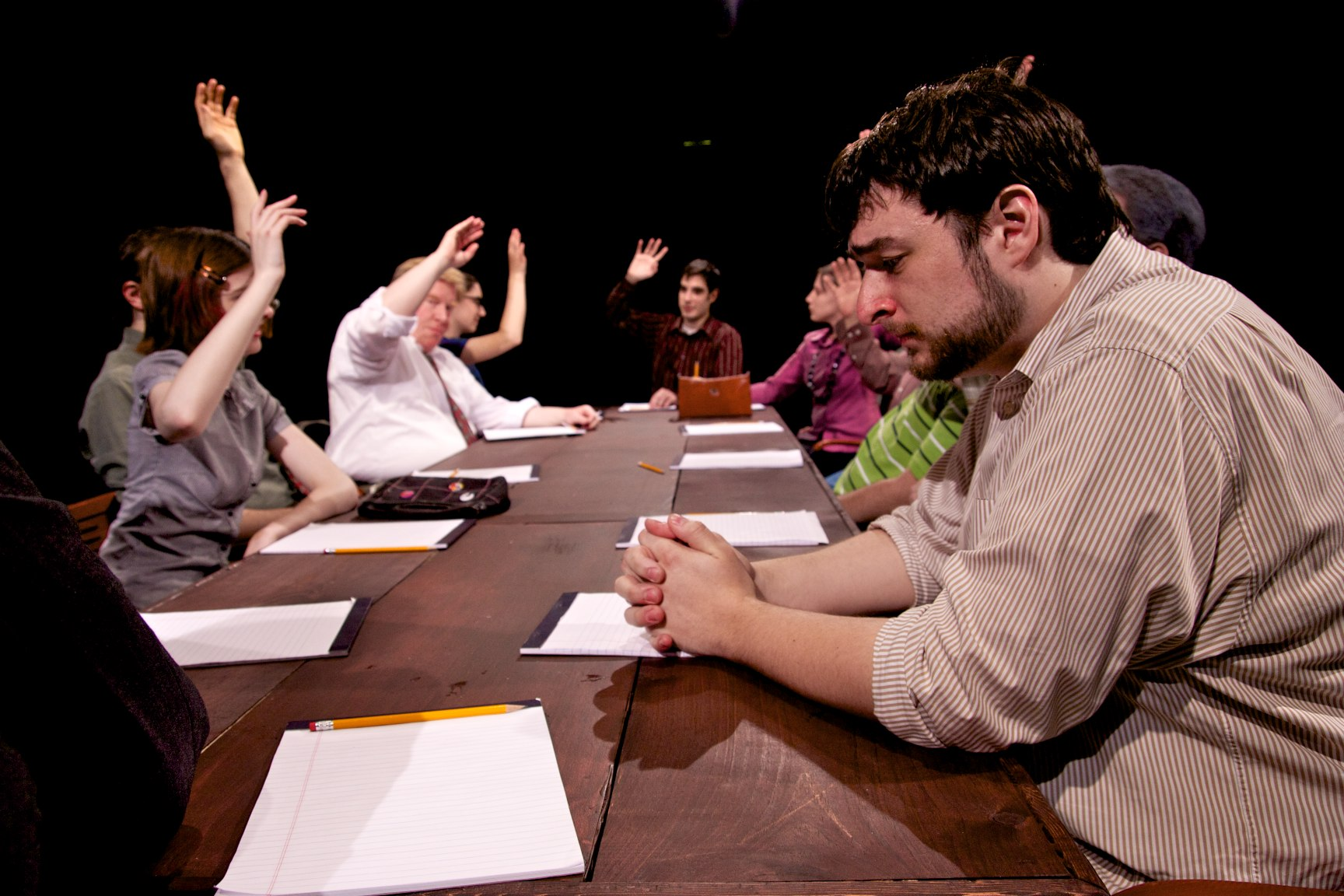
The Flat Earth Theatre of Massachusetts presented Twelve Angry Jurors, the mixed-gender variation of Twelve Angry Men, in 2009.

It is still frequently performed, especially by amateurs, and for a long time was the only version licensed for performance in the United States. The existence of two distinct versions of the play, Rose's and Sergel's, has created frequent confusion between them. Dramatic Publishing created versions that can be performed by casts of women or of mixed gender, Twelve Angry Women, published in 1983, and Twelve Angry Jurors. For Rose, however, the characters were inherently male and changing their gender would undermine his "twelve men in a box" premise and its dramatic tension.

== Plot ==
Sergel's play closely follows Rose's teleplay, using its three-act structure, including the continuity of action between each act, with each act picking up immediately where the prior act left off. It uses much of the teleplay's dialogue with only slight alterations.

Sergel added new dialogue that increases the length of the 50-minute teleplay to an evening length play. He includes more discussion of the evidence in the case and shows that the defense was weak, but also introduces, according to Bangor University professor of literature and film Steven Price in an introduction to Rose's play, a "certain amount of authorial moralizing." Rose's later play, which he revised several times, uses material written for the film and uses a two act structure.
