= Owen O'Neill =

Northern Irish writer, actor, director, and comedian

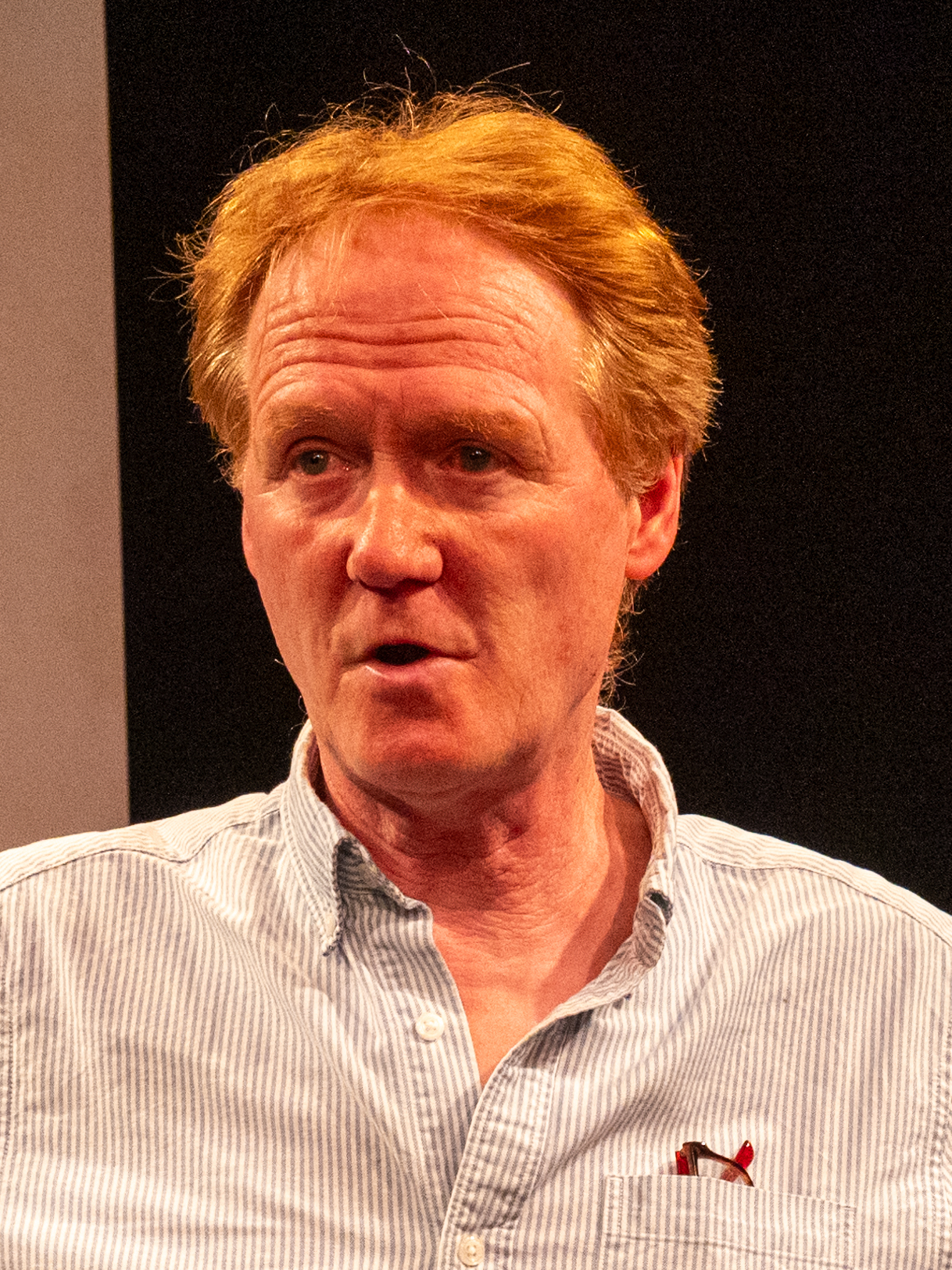
- O'Neill at the 2024 Chiswick Book Festival
- Born: Cookstown, Northern Ireland

Comedy career
- Years active: 1985–present
- Medium: Stand up, television, film, theatre
- Genres: Observational comedy, Black comedy, Character comedy
- Website: owenoneill.co.uk

Owen O'Neill is a Northern Irish writer, actor, director, and comedian.

== Early life ==
O'Neill was born, the third eldest of 16 children, in Cookstown, Northern Ireland. He has drawn on his upbringing in Cookstown for some of his more colourful characters in his standup and theatre work. Early comic influences included W. C. Fields, Laurel and Hardy, and particularly Richard Pryor: "It was also poignant and heartfelt and I realised then that stand-up could be an art-form". He briefly attended Queen’s University in Belfast studying English, but dropped out and worked various menial jobs in Italy, Amsterdam, and finally London at age 21.

== Career ==
O'Neill cites his career as beginning in poetry. In 1981 he entered and won a poetry competition for BBC Radio 4 and his stand-up evolved out of his poetry readings. He debuted on television in 1985 on Saturday Live. As an actor, he has appeared in the films Michael Collins and The General.

O'Neill is a veteran of the Edinburgh Fringe Festivals, having performed stand-up or theatre gigs there for over twenty years. He was nominated for the 1994 Perrier Award with his show "It's a Bit Like This", and won a Fringe First in 1999 with Sean Hughes for the theatre show "Dehydrated and Travellin' Light". Theatre sets have included 12 Angry Men, One Flew Over The Cuckoo's Nest and The Odd Couple. Stand-up has included "Off My Face" and "It Was Henry Fonda's Fault".

As a writer, his debut feature film Arise and Go Now was screened by BBC2 and was directed by Danny Boyle and starred Ian Bannen. He has adapted a number of his works of short fictions to be plays or films.

His short film The Basket Case won the best Irish short at the 2008 Boston Irish Film Festival, where judges described it as "a beautiful and memorable film", and best International short at The 2010 Fantaspoa film festival in Brazil.

O'Neill's play Absolution performed on Off Broadway in 2010 to good reviews. Charles Isherwood of The New York Times praised the effective writing and O'Neill's performance as "hold[ing] the attention fast with its understated, almost offhand intensity.". He won best actor at the Irish Theatre Festival Awards for the role.

=== Awards and honours ===
Year	Award	Category	For	Result
1993	Cork Film Festival	Best Irish Short	Shooting to Stardom	Won
1993	Chicago International Film Festival	Best Short Film	Shooting to Stardom	Won
1994	Perrier Comedy Awards		"It's A Bit Like This"	Nominated
1998	LWT Writing Award		Off My Face	Won
1999	Fringe First		"Dehydrated & Travellin' Light" (with Sean Hughes), "Dead Meat"	Won
2008	Boston Irish Film Festival	Best Irish Short	The Basket Case	Won
2008	Brazilian Santa Posa	Best Short	The Basket Case	Won
2010	First Irish Theatre Festival Awards	Best Actor	Absolution	Won

== Filmography ==
=== Film ===
- Michael Collins (Rory O’Connor) (1998)
- "Arise and Go Now" (writer) (1991)
- The Basket Case (writer) (2008)

=== Television ===
- Shooting to Stardom (writer) (1993)
- The Bill (George Rayburn) (2000)
- The Fitz (writer) (2000)
- DNA (writer) (2000)
- Saints and Scholars (presenter) 2000-02

=== Theatre ===
- Much Ado About Nothing (Dogberry) (1998)
- Off My Face (1998)
- 12 Angry Men (2003)
- One flew over the Cuckoo’s Nest (Dale Harding) (2006)
- The Odd Couple (Roy)(2005)
- The Shawshank Redemption (2009)
- Absolution (Nathan, also playwright)(2010)

== Bibliography ==
- WB Yeats and Me (short story)
- The Basket Case (short story)
- Volcano Dancing (2006)
- Tom Joad and Me (2024)
