= Alhamra Arts Council =

Building in Lahore, Pakistan

- شورای فنون الحمرا
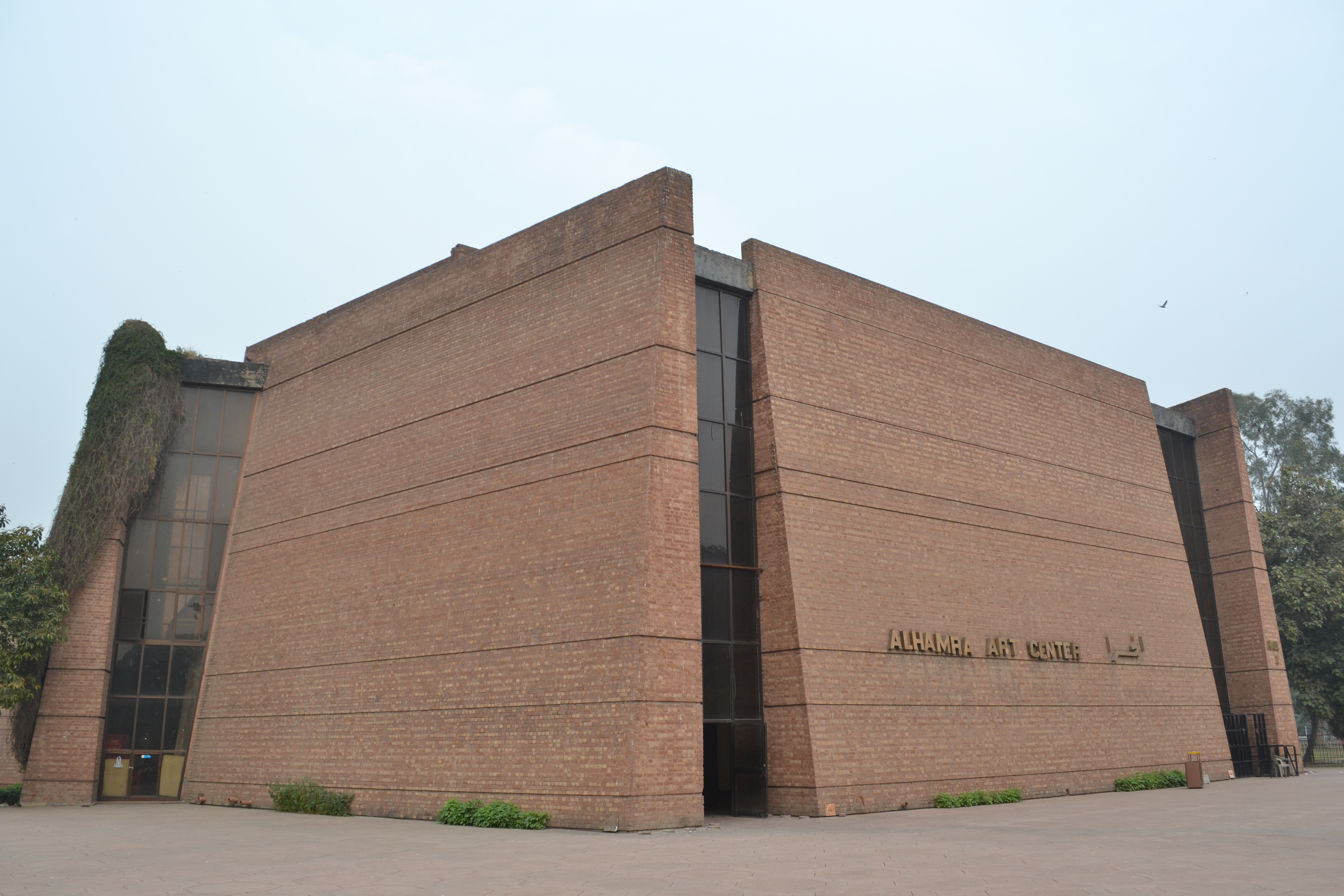
- Interactive map of Alhamra Arts Council
- Address: Lahore; Pakistan
- Coordinates: 31.5582766°N 74.3290015°E
- Capacity: 1000-seat auditorium
- Type: Arts Council

Construction
- Opened: 1992

Website
- lac.punjab.gov.pk

Alhamra Arts Council (also known as the Alhamra Hall, Alhamra Cultural Complex, Alhamra Art Gallery and Lahore Arts Council) is a cultural institution and event-staging venue in Lahore, Pakistan. The venue was designed by Nayyar Ali Dada and completed in 1992.

The Alhamra Arts Council building is located on a colonial-era road that was formerly known as Mall Road and has been renamed as Shahrah Quaid-e-Azam. The origins of the arts complex lie in an initial commission of Nayyar Ali Dada to design a 1000-seat auditorium for the Alhamra Arts Council (AAC), of which he was a member. The AAC had been given the site by the government in the years immediately following independence but had generally staged its performances outdoors. The auditorium was completed in 1979 and replaced some temporary buildings.

A further three phases of construction followed that of the auditorium. There were commissioned from Dada by the Lahore Arts Council, a government agency that took over the project from the non-governmental Alhamra Arts Council following a dispute concerning ownership of the land. The first of these phases was completed in 1984 and consisted of offices and art galleries housed in four octagonal structures. In the following year, a 450-seat theatre in hexagonal form was added to the existing auditorium and, in 1992, an octagonal 250-seat facility for lectures and recitals was completed. The buildings are placed in a manner that creates semi-enclosed courtyards and the various polygonal shapes in their design are intended to enhance acoustics when used for performances.

The structures are influenced by Mughal architecture and are constructed using a veneer of handmade red bricks overlaying a concrete form. The bricks are bonded with a local mortar and reflect the construction of the historic Lahore Fort and Badshahi Mosque, as well as the red sandstone that was favoured by the Mughals.

The design was a winner of the Aga Khan Award for Architecture in 1998, when the jury described it as "a rare example of flexible spaces that has enabled several additions to be made over time, each of which has in turn enhanced, rather than detracted from, its overall architectural value. Qasim Ali Shah appointed as Chairman of Alhamra Arts Council in February 2023.
