= Dramatic Publishing =

American play publisher

- Industry: Publishing
- Founded: 1885; 141 years ago in Chicago, U.S.
- Founder: Charles Hubbard Sergel
- Headquarters: Woodstock, Illinois, U.S.
- Website: www.dramaticpublishing.com

The Dramatic Publishing Company (DPC) is a publishing company established in Chicago and incorporated under the laws of Illinois. It publishes plays and licenses their stage performance rights. The business was founded in 1885 by Charles Hubbard Sergel (1861–1926), and was formally incorporated in Illinois on September 23, 1887.

Christopher Sergel, great-nephew of Charles Hubbard Sergel, was president of the company from 1970 until his death in 1993.

It now is based in Woodstock, Illinois, where its registered agent—as of 2024—is Christopher Triton Sergel III (born 1967), a great grand-nephew of the founder and son of Christopher Sergel.
