= List of Muhajir people =

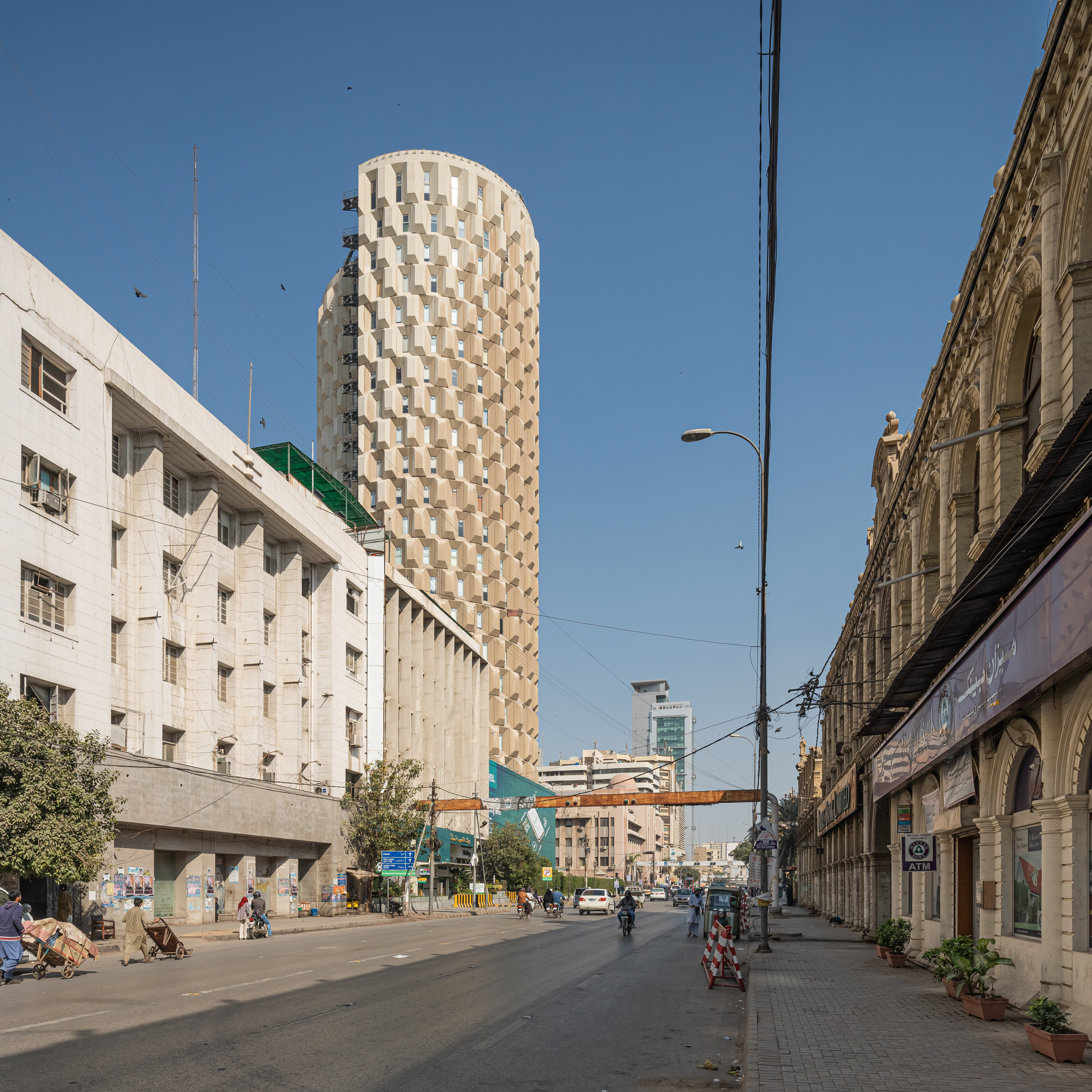
Karachi is a well-known Muhajir-dominated city in Pakistan.

This is a list of notable Muhajir people. Muslims that migrated mainly from North India and Hyderabad after the independence of Pakistan in 1947.

== Political ==
- Aamir Liaquat Hussain (1971–2022), politician and television
- Abida Sultan (1913–2002), former crown princess of Bhopal
- Abul A'la Maududi (1903–1979), founder of Jamaat-e-Islami
- Afaq Ahmed (born 1962), founder and leader of Mohajir Qaumi Movement Pakistan
- Afzal Haq Chaudhary Leader, Majlas-e Ahrar
- Ahmad Noorani Siddiqi (1926–2003), leader of the Jamiat Ulema-e-Pakistan, founder of the World Islamic Mission
- Ali Rashid, politician
- Ali Zaidi (born 1952), politician
- Altaf Hussain (born 1953), founder and leader of MQM
- Amir Khan, senior deputy convener of MQM
- Azeem Ahmed Tariq, former chairman of (MQM)
- Babar Khan Ghauri, (MQM)
- Chaudhry Khaliquzzaman
- Faisal Sabzwari, (MQM)
- Farooq Sattar, former mayor of Karachi, MNA, convener of MQM
- Moinuddin Haider, ex army general, governor, interior minister
- Fauzia Wahab, secretary-general of the Central Executive Committee of PPP
- Habib Ibrahim Rahimtoola, ambassador, governor, minister
- Haider Abbas Rizvi (MQM)
- Hammad Siddiqui (former MQM)
- Imran Farooq co-founder of MQM
- Ismail Ibrahim Chundrigar, former prime minister of Pakistan
- Ishrat-ul-Ibad Khan, former governor of Sindh province
- Josh Malihabadi
- Mubashir Hassan, co-founder of PPP
- Mamnoon Hussain, Former President of Islamic Republic of Pakistan
- Barrister Muhammad Hanif Khan, Rana Former Federal Minister of Finance, PPP.
- Naimatullah Khan, former mayor of Karachi City
- Nawab Mohsin-ul-Mulk
- Princess Sarvath El Hassan, Princess of Jordan
- Pervez Mushrraf, former Prime Minister of Pakistan
- Qadeeruddin Ahmed (governor, judge)
- Rahimuddin Khan, general (retd.) former military governor of Sindh, Balochistan province
- Ra'ana Liaquat Ali Khan
- Shaukat Aziz, former prime minister and finance minister of Pakistan
- Sheikh Liaquat Hussain
- Syed Aminul Haque
- Syed Amir-uddin Kedwaii
- Syed Ali Abbas Jalalpuri
- Sheikh Salahuddin
- Faisal Raza Abidi (ex-senator, ex-PPP)
- Syeda Shehla Raza, PPP, current Deputy Speaker of Sindh Assembly
- Taj Haider
- Liaquat Ali Khan
- Syed Munawar Hasan, EX Ameer Jamaat-e-Islami Pakistan
- Farahnaz Ispahani
- Sadiq Khan, mayor of london
- Muhammad Hashim Gazdar

== Bureaucrats ==
- Ikramullah- Pakistan's first foreign secretary considered to be founder of foreign office.
- Rizwan Ahmed- secretary to Government of Pakistan (Federal Secretary)
- Agha Shahi
- Sahabzada Yaqub Khan- prince of former Rampur State. Ex-foreign minister of Pakistan.
- Shahryar Khan- former foreign secretary and present chairman Cricket Board in Pakistan. Prince of former Bhopal State and Kurwai State.
- Agha Hilaly
- Zafar Hilaly
- Abul Hassan Isphani
- Zafrul Ahsan Lari
- Abul Hasan Quraishi

== Journalists ==
- Ahfaz-ur-Rahman
- Atif Tauqeer
- Azhar Abbas
- Kamran Khan
- Mujahid Barelvi
- Shahzeb Khanzada
- Syed Saleem Shahzad
- Waseem Badami

== Science and technology ==
- Abdul Qadeer Khan (metallurgist and founder of Pakistan's Nuclear Programme)
- Ahmed Mohiuddin (zoologist)
- Abdul Hameed Nayyar (nuclear physicist)
- Atta-ur-Rahman (chemist)
- Faheem Hussain (theoretical physicist)
- Hafeez Hoorani (particle physicist)
- Muhammad Hafeez Qureshi (nuclear physicist)
- Raziuddin Siddiqui (astrophysicist and mathematician)
- Salimuzzaman Siddiqui (HI, MBE, SI, D.Phil.), (scientist in natural products chemistry, founder of H.E.J. Research Institute of Chemistry
- M. Shahid Qureshi (astrophysicist and mathematician)
- Ishrat Hussain Usmani (founder of Atomic Energy Commission of Pakistan)
- Ishfaq Ahmad (Pakistan Atomic Energy, Nishan-e-imtiaz)
- Abdur Rahman Hye, architect, first Chief Architect of the Government of West Pakistan.
- Asifa Akhtar Biologist Gene therapist
- Mohammad Sajjad Alam
- Javed Jabbar

== Armed forces ==
- Pervez Musharraf (ex-president)
- Mirza Aslam Beg (COAS)
- Syed Shahid Hamid (Founder of Inter-Services Intelligence)
- Sahabzada Yaqub Khan
- Sher Ali Khan Pataudi
- Abrar Hussain (general) (Won Hilal-i-Jur'at, second highest Pakistani Military Award, for Battle of Chawinda)
- Shamim Alam Khan
- Muzaffar Hussain Usmani (Ex-Corp Commander Karachi)
- S. G. M. M. Peerzada
- Moinuddin Haider
- Athar Abbas
- Shahid Aziz
- Mirza Hamid Hussain
- Shafaat Ullah Shah
- Nadeem Raza
- Javed Alam Khan
- Jamshed Ayaz Khan
- Zafar H. Naqvi
- FS Hussain
- MM Alam
- Masroor Hosain
- Haider Raza
- Saeedullah Khan
- Inamul Haque Khan
- Maqbool Rabb
- S. M. Ahsan (Governor, Commander of Navy)
- Yastur-ul-Haq Malik (Chief of Naval Staff)
- Syed Arifullah Hussaini (Commander Pakistan Fleet)
- Muzaffar Hassan
- Saeed Mohammad Khan
- Shahid Karimullah
- Shamoon Alam Khan
- Ahmad Zamir
- Ovais Ahmed Bilgrami
- K. M. Hussain

== Education ==
- Abu Bakr Ahmad Haleem (Vice Chancellor Karachi University)
- Abdul Wahab (educationist), Vice Chancellor Karachi University
- Abul Khair Kashfi (author, critic, linguist, scholar)
- Abul Lais Siddiqui (author, critic, linguist, scholar)
- Farman Fatehpuri (real name: Syed Dildar Ali; author, critic, linguist, scholar)
- Ghulam Mustafa Khan (author, critic, linguist, scholar, Sufi)
- Hakim Saeed (Vice Chancellor Hamdard University)
- Ishtiaq Hussain Qureshi (Vice Chancellor Karachi University, author, historian, scholar)
- Jameel Jalibi (linguist, scholar)
- Aslam Farrukhi (author, poet, critic, linguist, scholar)
- Rehmat Farrukhabadi (historian, critic, author)
- Khalida Ghous (human rights activist, scholar)
- Mahmud Hussain (Vice Chancellor)
- Dr. Mohammad Ajmal Khan
- Moinuddin Aqeel (author, critic, linguist, scholar)
- Nomanul Haq (International scholar, Intellectual historian)
- Nasim Amrohvi
- Pirzada Qasim (Vice Chancellor Karachi University, scientist, author, poet, scholar)
- Raziuddin Siddiqui (physicist, mathematician, scholar)
- Shahid Aziz Siddiqi (former Federal Secretary, Vice Chancellor Ziauddin University)
- Sulaiman Shahabuddin, President of Aga Khan university
- S. Akbar Zaidi, executive director of the Institute of Business Administration, Karachi
- Shakil Auj
- Syed Ali Abbas Jalalpuri
- Khurshid Ahmad

== Arts and literature ==
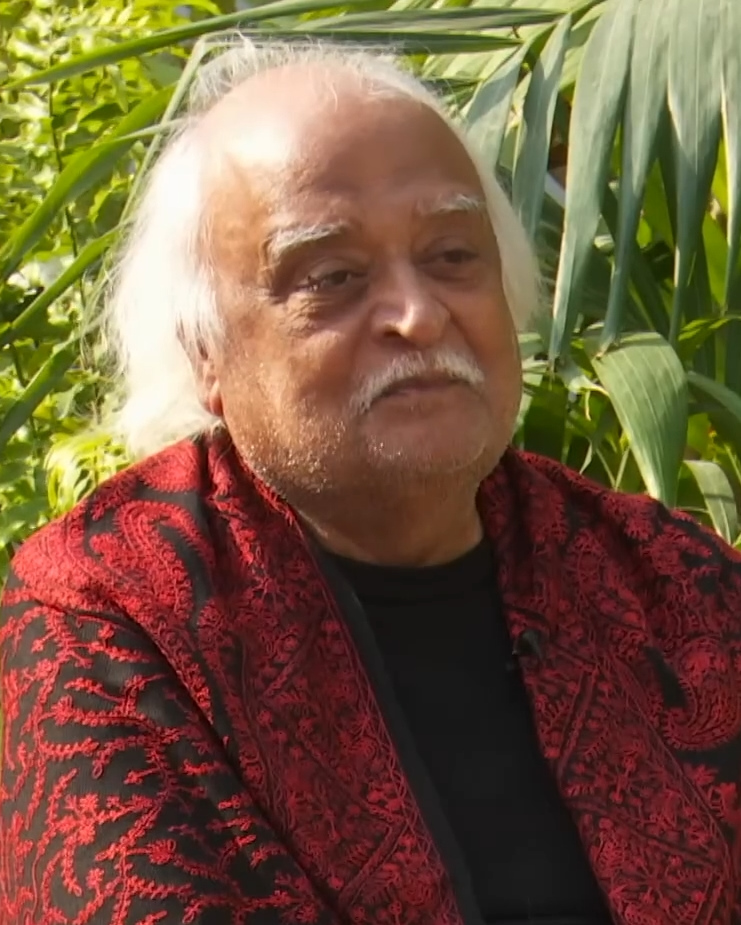
Anwar Maqsood is considered the national writer of Pakistan.

- Ahmed Ali, Pioneer of Urdu short stories
- Sibt-e-Jaafar Zaidi (soazkhuwan)
- Abdul Haq, Moulvi (father of modern Urdu)
- Abul Khair Kashfi, Prof. Dr. (critic, linguist, author, scholar)
- Abul Lais Siddiqui, Prof. Dr. (critic, linguist, author, scholar)
- Altaf Fatima (novelist, author)
- Anwar Maqsood (drama writer, anchor, actor)
- Aslam Farrukhi, Prof. Dr. (writer, critic, linguist)
- Rehmat Farrukhabadi (historian, critic, author)
- Bushra Rahman, writer
- Dilawer Figar (humorous poet, scholar)
- Farman Fatehpuri, Prof. Dr. (researcher, poet, critic, linguist)
- Fatima Surayya Bajia (drama writer)
- Fehmida Riaz (writer, poet, activist)
- Ghazi Salahuddin (writer, literary figure, and the scholar of political science)
- Ghulam Mustafa Khan, Prof. Dr. (writer, critic, linguist, researcher, scholar, educationist)
- Hakeem Muhammad Saeed (pioneer of Eastern medicine, philanthropist)
- Hameed Haroon (journalist, activist)
- Hasan Abidi (scholar, poet, journalist)
- Muhammad Hasan Askari (philosopher, author, critic)
- Haseena Moin (playwright, drama writer)
- Ibn-e-Safi (novelist, story writer)
- Iftikhar Arif (poet, critic, author)
- Ishtiaq Ahmed ( Author)
- Intizar Hussain (linguist, novelist, critic)
- Ishtiaq Hussain Qureshi (author, historian, educationist)
- Jamil Jalibi (scholar, critic, linguist, former VC KU)
- Jamiluddin Aali (poet, columnist, critic)
- Jaun Elia (poet, philosopher)
- Jawayd Anwar (poet, writer)
- Josh Malihabadi (poet, linguist, scholar)
- Kamila Shamsie (novelist, story writer)
- Khalique Ibrahim Khalique (journalist, poet, critic)
- Manzoor Ahmad (philosopher)
- Mubarak Ali (historian, activist, columnist)
- Mushtaq Ahmad Yusufi (author, humorist)
- Mustafa Zaidi (poet)
- Muzaffar Warsi (poet)
- Nasim Amrohvi (poet, author, linguist, scholar, activist, journalist, educator, philosopher)
- Obaidullah Aleem (journalist, poet)
- Obaidullah Baig ( scholar, Urdu writer/novelist, columnist, media expert & documentary filmmaker)
- Parveen Shakir (poet, author, scholar)
- Pirzada Qasim (poet, author, educationist)
- Rais Amrohvi (journalist, poet, psychoanalyst)
- Raees Warsi (journalist, author, poet, founder of Urdu Markaz New York)
- Sadequain (painter, calligraphist)
- Shafiq-ur-Rahman (humorist)
- Shaista Suhrawardy Ikramullah (writer, woman activist)
- Shakeb Jalali (poet, journalist, story writer, columnist)
- Shakeel Badayuni (news reader)
- Shan-ul-Haq Haqqee, Dr. (researcher, linguist, poet, author)
- Shaukat Siddiqui (novelist, fiction writer)
- Shaukat Thanvi (writer, humourist)
- Sibte Hassan (author, columnist, activist)
- Tabish Dehlvi (poet)
- Zahida Hina (columnist, author, poet)
- Zaib-un-Nissa Hamidullah (first female columnist of Pakistan)
- Zehra Nigah (poet)
- Zamir Ali Badayuni (critic)
- Junaid Jamshed (Religious figure, former pop star)

== Philanthropists ==
- Abdul Sattar Edhi
- Hakim Said, medical researcher
- Agha Hasan Abedi, banker and philanthropist
- Ramzan Chippa

== Social activists ==
- Abdul Sattar Edhi
- Ansar Burney
- Fahmida Riaz
- Nafis Sadik (United Nations)
- Akhtar Hameed Khan
- Sabeen Mahmud
- Muhammad Jibran Nasir

== Economics ==
- Agha Hasan Abedi (banker)
- Akhtar Hameed Khan (pioneer of microcredit and microfinance in Pakistan, founder of Orangi Pilot Project)
- Imtiaz Alam Hanfi (former governor State Bank of Pakistan)
- Ishrat Husain (former governor State Bank of Pakistan)
- Nawab Haider Naqvi (former director PIDE)
- Shaukat Aziz (economist, ex prime minister)
- Syed Salim Raza (former governor State Bank of Pakistan)
- Zahid Hussain (first governor State Bank of Pakistan)
- M. Shahid Alam

== Business ==
- Agha Hasan Abedi (UBL; BCCI; FAST; GIK)
- Ameena Saiyid (Oxford University Press)
- Hakim Said (Hamdard Pakistan)
- Sikandar Sultan (Shan Foods Industries)
- Syed Ali Raza
- Mirza Mehdy Ispahani
- Mohammad Zahoor

== Law and judiciary ==
- Ajmal Mian (former Chief Justice of Pakistan)
- Alvin Robert Cornelius (first chief justice of Pakistan)
- Haziqul Khairi (former chief justice of Federal Shariat Court of Pakistan)
- Hamoodur Rahman (former chief justice of Pakistan)
- Majida Rizvi (first woman judge in Pakistani superior judiciary)
- Makhdoom Ali Khan (former attorney general for Pakistan)
- Mohammad Haleem (former chief justice of Pakistan)
- Naimatullah Khan (advocate)
- Nasir Aslam Zahid (former Pakistan Supreme Court judge)
- Nazim Hussain Siddiqui (former chief justice of Pakistan)
- Qadeeruddin Ahmed (former justice of Pakistan)
- Saeeduzzaman Siddiqui (former chief justice and governor of Pakistan)
- Syed Sharifuddin Pirzada (former attorney general for Pakistan and foreign minister; former advisor to prime minister)
- Wajihuddin Ahmed (Chief Justice Sind High Court and Judge Supreme Court of Pakistan)
- Zahirul Hasnain Lari

== Metaphysics, spirituality and religion ==
- Amin Ahsan Islahi
- Israr Ahmed
- Muhammad Muslehuddin Siddiqui
- Muhammad Abdul Wahhab, Ameer Tableegi Jamaat Pakistan
- Rafi Usmani, Darul Uloom Korangi Karachi
- Taqi Usmani, Darul Uloom Korangi Karachi
- Nasim Amrohvi* Muntakhib al-Haqq, Dean of Islamic Studies, University of Karachi, and Jurisconsult to the Federal Shariat Court
- Sulaiman Nadvi
- Maulana Maududi
- Muhammad Hamidullah
- Allama Rasheed Turabi
- Naseer Turabi

== Performing art and media ==
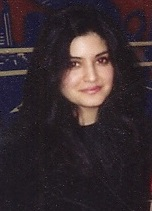
Nazia Hassan

- Imran Abbas, actor and model
- Adeel Hussain (actor)
- Ali Haider (singer)
- Alamgir Haq (singer)
- Amjad Sabri (Qawwal)
- Anwar Maqsood (drama writer, anchor, actor)
- Arij Fatyma (actress)
- Ahmed Ali Butt (singer, comedian)
- Asim Raza (film producer and director)
- Aziz Mian (Qawwal)
- Behroze Sabzwari (comedian, actor)
- Bilal Maqsood (pop singer, composer)
- Bilal Abbas Khan(actor)
- Faisal Kapadia (pop singer, composer)
- Fawad Khan (actor, pop singer)
- Fatima Surayya Bajia (drama writer)
- Habib Wali Mohammad (Ghazal singer and industrialist)
- Hasina Moin (writer: Ankahi, Tanhaiyan,etc.
- Iqbal Bano (Pakistani singer)
- Izhar Qazi (film and TV actor)
- Jamshed Ansari (comedian)
- Khalida Riyasat (actress)
- Komal Rizvi (singer, actress)
- Lehri (film comedian)
- Mahira Khan (actress)
- Ayeza Khan (actress)
- Mahira Khan(actress)
- Maheen Rizvi (actress, model)
- Mehdi Hassan (Ghazal Singer)
- Mehnaz Begum (singer)
- Mir Zafar Ali (two-time Oscar Award winner, visual effects specialist)
- Moin Akhtar (actor)
- Nadeem (actor)
- Nadia Ali (singer)
- Naveen Naqvi (anchor)
- Naveen Waqar (actress)
- Nazia Hassan (first female pop singer of Pakistan)
- Nirala (real name: Muzaffar Husain; comedian)
- Nisar Bazmi music director
- Sohail Rana Composer, Music Director
- Qazi Wajid (comedian)
- Riz Ahmed (actor, rapper and Emmy award winner)
- Rahat Kazmi ( Actor)
- Salim Nasir (comedian/actor)
- Shaukat Hussain Rizvi (film director, producer, editor, and a supporting actor)
- Shakeel (TV & Film Actor)
- Shakeel Siddiqui (TV, film and stage actor, comedian)
- Sharmeen Obaid-Chinoy (filmmaker) (two-time Oscar & Emmy awards winner)
- Shehroz Sabzwari (actor)
- Shoaib Mansoor (television producer, television director, writer, musician, lyricist, film director, record producer)
- Syed Kamal (actor)
- Talat Hussain (actor)
- Qazi Wajid (Actor)
- Umair Haroon (TV producer, director, and actor)
- Umer Sharif (comedian)
- Zoheb Hassan (singer)
- Zubaida Tariq (chef, herbalist, cooking expert)
- Sana Javed, (actress)
- Talha Younus (singer)
- Aiman Khan (actor)
- Minal Khan (actor)
- Annie Ali Khan (model)
- Shehzad Roy (singer)
- Sultan Rahi (actor)

== Sports ==
=== Cricketers ===
- Saeed Anwar (born 1968)
- Asif Iqbal (born 1943)
- Basit Ali (born 1970)
- Faisal Iqbal
- Hanif Mohammad
- Mushtaq Mohammad
- Sadiq Mohammad
- Wazir Mohammad
- Shoaib Mohammad
- Asif Mujtaba
- Iqbal Qasim
- Inzamam Ul Haq
- Moin Khan
- Mohammad Sami
- Khalid Latif
- Javed Miandad
- Shahzaib Hassan
- Khurram Manzoor
- Rashid Latif
- Saadat Ali
- Ashraf Ali
- Sadiq Mohammad
- Saleem Yousuf
- Sarfraz Ahmed
- Sikandar Bakht
- Tauseef Ahmed
- Fawad Alam
- Asad Shafiq
- Saud Shakeel
- Sharjeel Khan
- Rumman Raees
- Danish Aziz
- Faisal Iqbal
- Azam Khan
- Nadeem Khan
- Tariq Haroon
- Hasan Raza
- Shan Masood
- Saim Ayub

=== Hockey players ===
- Hanif Khan (Hockey Player)
- Kashif Jawad (hockey)
- Islahuddin (hockey)
- Sohail Abbas (hockey)

== Medicine ==
- Dr. Adeebul Hasan Rizvi (Head of Sindh Institute of Urology and Transplantation)
- Hakim Said, medical researcher
- Muhammad Ali Shah (orthopaedic surgeon)
- Ziauddin Ahmed (Ziauddin Chain of Hospitals, Ziauddin Medical University
