= Imraan Mohammad =

English cricketer

Personal information
- Born: 31 December 1976 (age 49); Solihull, Warwickshire, England
- Batting: Right-handed
- Bowling: Right-arm off break
- Relatives: Sadiq Mohammad (father); Shahid Mohammad (cousin); Asif Mohammad (cousin); Waqar Mohammad (cousin); Shoaib Mohammad (cousin); Wazir Mohammad (uncle); Raees Mohammad (uncle); Mushtaq Mohammad (uncle); Hanif Mohammad (uncle)

Domestic team information
- Years: Team
- 2001/02: Hyderabad (Pakistan)
- 2000: Gloucestershire Cricket Board
- 2000: Gloucestershire
- 1999/00-2001/02: Pakistan Customs
- 1998–1999: Cornwall
- 1997–1999: Cambridge University

Career statistics
Competition	FC	LA
Matches	35	3
Runs scored	1,701	55
Batting average	34.71	18.33
100s/50s	4/6	–/1
Top score	210*	53
Balls bowled	485	42
Wickets	4	1
Bowling average	68.25	38.00
5 wickets in innings	–	–
10 wickets in match	–	–
Best bowling	1/13	1/38
Catches/stumpings	12/–	2/–
- Source: Cricinfo, 9 November 2010

Imraan Mohammad (born 31 December 1976) is an English cricketer. Mohammad is a right-handed batsman who bowls right-arm off break. He was born at Solihull, Warwickshire.

Mohammad made his first-class debut for Cambridge University against Middlesex in 1997. From 1997 to 1999, he represented the university in 15 first-class matches, the last of which came against Oxford University. During this period, he also played a single first-class match for British Universities against the touring New Zealanders.

It was while representing the university that he made his debut for Cornwall in the Minor Counties Championship against Wales Minor Counties in 1998. From 1998 to 1999, he represented the county in 9 Championship matches, the last of which came against Devon.

During the 1999/00 Pakistan cricket season, Mohammad made his debut for Pakistan Customs against Hyderabad. It was during this season that he made his debut in List A cricket when Pakistan Customs played Karachi Whites.

In the following English cricket season, he made his first-class debut for Gloucestershire in the County Championship against Sussex. During the 2000 season he played 4 first-class matches for the county, the last of which came against Worcestershire. During the 2000 season, he also represented the Gloucestershire Cricket Board in List A cricket. His debut for the Board came against the Nottinghamshire Cricket Board in the 2000 NatWest Trophy. His second and final List A match for the Board came in the same competition against the Derbyshire Cricket Board. It was in his 3 List A matches that he scored 55 runs at a batting average of 18.33, with a single half century high score of 53. In the field he took 3 catches, while with the ball he took a single wicket at a bowling average of 38.00, with best figures of 1/38.

For the 2001/02 Pakistani season, he once more represented Pakistan Customs. During this season he represented the team in 5 first-class matches, the last of which came against Pakistan International Airlines. During the same season, he also represented Hyderabad in first-class cricket. He made his debut for the team against Bahawalpur and played for the team in 3 further matches, with his final first-class appearance coming against Gujranwala. In his combined total of 35 first-class matches, he scored 1,701 runs at an average of 34.71, with 6 half centuries and 4 centuries. His highest score in first-class cricket was an unbeaten double century (210*). In the field he took 12 catches, while with the ball he took 4 wickets an average of 68.25, with best figures of 1/26.

He played club cricket for Hampstead Cricket Club in the Middlesex County Cricket League between 2006 and 2011.

After he retired from cricket, he became an investment manager.

== Family ==
Mohammad comes from a large and famous Pakistani cricketing family. His father, Sadiq Mohammad played Test cricket for Pakistan. His cousin, Shoaib Mohammad, also represented Pakistan in Test cricket, as well as One Day International cricket. His uncles Wazir Mohammad, Mushtaq Mohammad and Hanif Mohammad also played Test cricket for Pakistan. Other relatives, Shahid Mohammad, Asif Mohammad and Raees Mohammad also played first-class and List A cricket.
