= Qamar Ahmed =

Pakistani cricketer and journalist (1937–2026)

Personal information
- Born: 23 October 1937; Mughal Serai, United Provinces, British India
- Died: 18 June 2026 (aged 88); Karachi, Sindh, Pakistan
- Batting: Right-handed
- Bowling: Slow left-arm orthodox

Domestic team information
- Years: Team
- 1956–57 to 1957–58: Sind
- 1958–59 to 1962–63: Hyderabad

Career statistics
Competition	First-class
Matches	17
Runs scored	371
Batting average	12.79
100s/50s	0/1
Top score	68 not out
Balls bowled	2023
Wickets	36
Bowling average	29.11
5 wickets in innings	1
10 wickets in match	0
Best bowling	6/36
Catches/stumpings	8/–
- Source: Cricinfo, 27 August 2015

Qamar Ahmed (Urdu: قمر احمد); (23 October 1937 – 18 June 2026) was a Pakistani cricket journalist and first-class cricketer who played for Sindh and Hyderabad cricket teams. He reported on more than 400 Test matches and the first eight Cricket World Cups.

== Early life ==
Born in the United Provinces of British India, Ahmed was the fifth of nine children – six sisters and three brothers. The family migrated to Pakistan following the end of the British rule in the sub-continent, and settled in Hyderabad.

== Playing career ==
Ahmed made his first-class debut for Sind against Karachi Whites in the Quaid-e-Azam Trophy in 1956–57, taking 3 for 60 in an innings defeat for Sind. He and the future Test player Mushtaq Mohammad, who was also making his first-class debut for Karachi Whites, dismissed each other. He played again for Sind in 1957–58, but the Sind team was discontinued in 1958, and he began playing for the new Hyderabad team in 1958–59. When Hyderabad won for the first time, against Khairpur in 1959–60, Ahmed took 6 for 36 with his left-arm spin in the second innings.

He captained Hyderabad in the Quaid-e-Azam Trophy in 1961–62, but they lost all three of their matches, failing to dismiss any of their opponents.

His highest score was 68 not out at number 10 for Hyderabad against Karachi A in 1962–63.

In Wounded Tiger, his history of Pakistan cricket, Peter Oborne says Ahmed has the unique distinction of having dismissed all five brothers of the famous Mohammad family in first-class cricket. In fact, although he did dismiss Hanif, Mushtaq and Sadiq, he did not dismiss Wazir or Raees – at least not in first-class cricket.

== Journalism ==
Ahmed earned a master's degree in English Literature at the University of Sindh and began his journalism career at the Indus Times in Hyderabad. Beginning in 1963 he worked as a freelance journalist. At the Third Test between Pakistan and Sri Lanka in Sharjah in January 2014 he became the third journalist, after John Woodcock and Richie Benaud, to cover 400 Tests. At that stage he had also covered 732 One Day Internationals and the first eight Cricket World Cups. For most of his journalism career he was based in the UK. He witnessed the 1000th and 2000th Test matches.

== Death ==
Ahmed died in Karachi on 18 June 2026, aged 88, after suffering a heart attack two weeks prior.

=== Books ===
- Pakistan Book of Cricket (annual from 1976 to 1998–99)
- Testing Time (1983)
- Showdown: The Story of Pakistan's Tour of the West Indies 1993 (1993)
- Playing for Pakistan: An Autobiography by Hanif Mohammad with Qamar Ahmed (1999)
- An Artist's Impression of the Golden Greats of Pakistan Cricket (with Shafiq Ahmed) (2002)
- For Cricket and Country by Waqar Hasan with Qamar Ahmed (2002)
- Far More than a Game: An Autobiography of a Cricket Writer and Broadcaster (2020)
