= Asif Mohammad =

Pakistani cricketer (born 1965)

Personal information
- Born: 21 December 1965 (age 60); Karachi, Sindh, Pakistan
- Batting: Right-handed
- Bowling: Right-arm off-spin
- Relatives: Raees Mohammad (father)

Domestic team information
- Years: Team
- 1978-79 to 1996-97: PIA

Career statistics
Competition	FC	List A
Matches	115	110
Runs scored	5085	1699
Batting average	31.19	23.27
100s/50s	7/27	0/5
Top score	183	73*
Balls bowled	3825	2932
Wickets	57	72
Bowling average	29.80	27.44
5 wickets in innings	2	0
10 wickets in match	0	n/a
Best bowling	5/54	4/10
Catches/stumpings	90/–	44/–
- Source: Cricinfo, 19 February 2022

Asif Mohammad (born 21 December 1965) is a Pakistani former cricketer who played 115 first-class cricket matches in Pakistan, mostly for Pakistan International Airlines (PIA), from 1979 to 2000. His father was the cricketer Raees Mohammad, and his uncles Wazir, Hanif, Mushtaq and Sadiq all played Test cricket for Pakistan.

Asif toured Zimbabwe with PIA in 1981–82, playing in both first-class matches against Zimbabwe, and scored a century in the second match. When the Sri Lanka Under-23 side toured Pakistan in 1983–84, he played in two of the three matches for the Pakistan Under-23 against the visitors. His highest first-class score was 183 for PIA against Agriculture Development Bank in the semi-final of the Patron's Trophy in 1993–94, when he batted for ten and a half hours. He was a member of PIA's title-winning teams in the Quaid-e-Azam Trophy in 1987–88 and 1989–90.

In 1994, aged 29, Asif and his brother went to England to play for Scunthorpe Town Cricket Club in the Lincolnshire League. He scored a century in each of his first three matches for Scunthorpe Town, and ended the season with a record 1,206 runs in the Lincolnshire League Premier Division, a record that still stands to this day, with seven centuries from his 15 innings.
