= Shehzar Mohammad =

Pakistani cricketer (born 1991)

Personal information
- Born: 12 November 1991 (age 35); Karachi, Sindh, Pakistan
- Batting: Right-handed
- Bowling: Right-arm offbreak
- Role: Occasional wicketkeeper
- Relatives: Hanif Mohammad (grandfather); Shoaib Mohammad (father); Sohai Ali Abro (wife)

Domestic team information
- Years: Team
- 2009/10–2018/19: Pakistan International Airlines
- 2019/20–present: Sindh
- Source: Cricinfo, 2 October 2016

Shehzar Mohammad (born 12 November 1991) is a Pakistani fitness trainer and first-class cricketer who has played for Pakistan International Airlines and Karachi Whites.

== Personal life ==
He is the grandson of cricketer Hanif Mohammad and son of cricketer Shoaib Mohammad. Hanif was one of the five Mohammad brothers, four of whom (Wazir, Mushtaq, Sadiq and Hanif himself) played Test cricket for Pakistan, as did Shehzar's father Shoaib.

In March 2021, Shehzar married actress Sohai Ali Abro in Karachi. The couple welcomed a daughter in November 2022.

== Domestic career ==
In October 2018, Shehzar became the sixth member of his family to hit a first-class double century when he scored 265 runs for Karachi Whites against Multan at the Multan Stadium in a 2018–19 Quaid-e-Azam Trophy match.

In September 2019, he was named in Sindh's squad for the 2019–20 Quaid-e-Azam Trophy tournament.

== Fitness training ==
Having done certificate courses in Sports Biomechanics and CrossFit from the United States, Shehzar has opened a gym in Karachi and has trained cricketers who have represented Pakistan, including Shan Masood and Azhar Ali, and also celebrities from other fields, such as actors Bilal Ashraf and Mohib Mirza.
