= Mohajir Qaumi Movement – Haqiqi =

Mohajir Qaumi Movement – Haqiqi مہاجر قومی موومنٹ – حقیقی
- Abbreviation: MQM-H
- Leader: Afaq Ahmed
- Founders: Afaq Ahmed; Amir Khan
- Founded: 1992; 34 years ago
- Split from: MQM-L
- Headquarters: Defence Housing Authority, Karachi (current); Bait Ul Hamza, Landhi (former/demolished in 2003)
- Ideology: Muhajir nationalism Pakistani nationalism Liberal socialism Secularism
- Political position: Centre-left
- Colors: Red, green and white

Election symbol
- Candle

Party flag
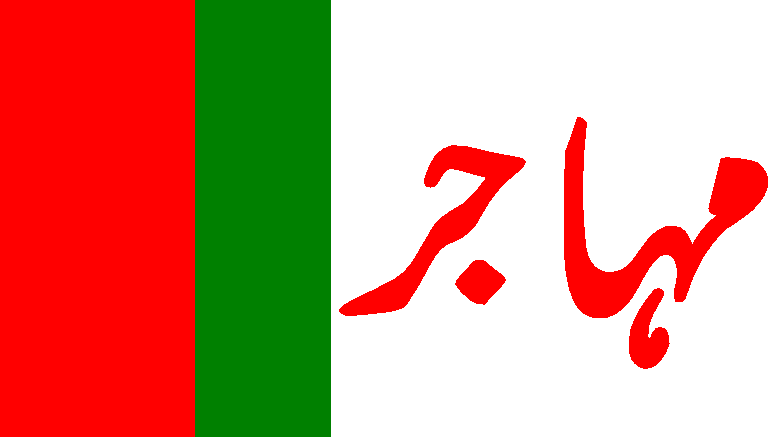

Website
- www.mohajir.com.pk

The Mohajir Qaumi Movement – Haqiqi (Urdu: مہاجر قومی موومنٹ – حقیقی) (MQM-Haqiqi) also known as Mohajir Qaumi Movement Pakistan, is a political party claiming to represent the Mohajir/Muhajir people (Urdu-speaking people) in Sindh, Pakistan. Its leader is Afaq Ahmed.

== History ==
The Movement was originally established by Altaf Hussain in 1978 as All Pakistan Mohajir Students Organization (APMSO), in Karachi University. Originally, the movement was known as "Muhajir Qaumi Movement" which was later established as the "MQM-L", headed by Altaf Hussain, who is living in self-exile in London.

In 2016, a separate party, the MQM-P, was created by Farooq Sattar, who split it from MQM founder and leader Altaf Hussain. The MQM-Altaf based faction was later rendered as Muttahida Qaumi Movement – London.

== Controversies ==
=== Afaq Ahmed's imprisonment ===
Ahmed was arrested in 2004 but, after almost eight years of imprisonment, the court had not found him guilty of any charges and, on 17 December 2011, the Sindh High Court declared that Ahmed's imprisonment under the "Maintenance of Public Order" provisions was illegal and ordered him to be set free. A crowd gathered outside of the jail to welcome their leader.

=== Urban Sindh province ===
Afaq Ahmed has advocated for the creation of a "Muhajir province" or "South Sindh" province.

== See also ==
- Muttahida Qaumi Movement – London
- Muttahida Qaumi Movement – Pakistan
- MQM militancy
- MQM violence (1994–2016)
- Pak Sarzameen Party
