= Ali Abbas =

Ali Abbas may refer to:

- Syed Ali Abbas Jalalpuri (1914–1998), Pakistani professor of philosophy
- Ali Abbas (actor) (born 1984), Pakistani television actor
- Ali Abbas (footballer) (born 1986), Iraqi Australian footballer
- Ali Ismail Abbas (born 1991), Iraqi man injured during the 2003 invasion of Iraq
- Ali Abbas Zafar (born 1982), Indian film director and screenwriter
- Ali Mahmoud Abbas (born 1964), Syrian military officer who served as the 18th Minister of Defense
