= Church Mission School =

Public school in Karachi

Church Mission School (CMS)

Location
- Karachi, Pakistan
- Coordinates: 24°51′42″N 67°00′22″E

Information
- Former name: Free School
- Type: Public school
- Established: 1854; 172 years ago
- Founder: Henry W. Preedy

The Church Mission School (CMS), officially known as CMS Government Boys Higher Secondary School, is a public school located in Karachi, Sindh, Pakistan.

The school was operated by the Christ Church before its 1971 nationalisation. Azizullah Sharif of Dawn stated that CMS, while operated by the church, was "one of the best educational institutions of the city where many students passed their matric examinations with flying colours." As of 2010, four institutions occupy the complex: CMS Primary School, CMS Secondary School, Cutchhi Memon Association (CMA) Primary, and CMA Girls Secondary School. As of that year these schools occupy blocks that are more recent, while the original three blocks were vacant.

== History ==
Colonel Henry W. Preedy founded the school in 1854 as Free School. The school was nationalized by the Pakistani government in 1971. In 2010, Pir Mazhar-ul-Haq, the Minister of Education of Sindh, ordered restoration of the three original blocks of the school, unused, after seeing them in a poor physical condition. Shabbir Jokhio, the district officer of male secondary schools and high schools, did not appear for the visit, so Mazhar-ul-Haq suspended him from his job.

== Notable alumni ==
- Muhammad Ali Jinnah, statesman and the founder of Pakistan
- Intikhab Alam, cricketer
- Ghulam Bombaywala, restaurateur in Houston, Texas
- Mushtaq Mohammad, cricketer
- Sadiq Mohammad, cricketer
- Haroon Rasheed, cricketer
- Javed Miandad, cricketer
