= Afaq Ahmed =

Pakistani politician

- آفاق احمد
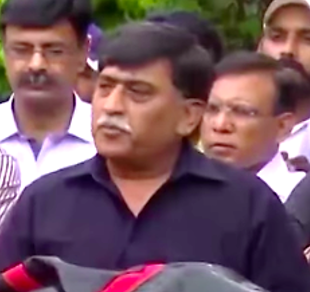

Leader of the MQM-H
- Incumbent
- Assumed office 1992

Personal details
- Born: 22 March 1962 (age 64) Karachi, Sindh, Pakistan
- Party: MQM-H (1992-present)
- Other political affiliations: MQM-L (1984-1992)
- Education: University of Karachi
- Occupation: Politician

Afaq Ahmed (Urdu: آفاق احمد; born 22 March 1962) is a Pakistani politician who is the leader of Muhajir Qaumi Movement (Haqiqi) (MQM-H), a break-away faction of the much larger than Muhajir Qaumi Movement which later became Muttahida Qaumi Movement (MQM).

== Life and career ==
Born to a Hyderabadi Muhajir family in Karachi, Ahmed graduated from University of Karachi. While still a student, he joined the All Pakistan Muttahidda Students Organization (APMSO) led by Altaf Hussain. Later, when the APMSO became a political party under the leadership of Hussain, Ahmed served as the party's joint secretary. However, in 1992, owing to some ideological differences with Altaf Hussain, Ahmed left the MQM and announced the creation of his own party named Mohajir Qaumi Movement - Haqiqi. Ahmed had to face serious consequences for this open rivalry with Altaf Hussain. His house was set on fire in the early 2010s and many of his supporters including some of his close relatives were murdered.

He contested the 2018 Pakistani general election from constituency NA-240 (Korangi Karachi-II) as a candidate of MQM-H but didn't succeed in winning and received 14,376 votes only.

=== Resignation from MQM-Haqiqi's chairmanship ===
Afaq Ahmed resigned from his leadership post in response to the election results which he claims were rigged. Speaking at a press conference at his house in Defence Housing Authority, Ahmed said, "We have failed to counter the conspiracies" and he advised the workers to choose a better leader. He later withdrawn his decision after few days.

== Controversy ==
=== Imprisonment ===
An operation was launched against Mohajir Qaumi Movement in 2002 after they secured a seat of National Assembly from Landhi constituency. Even Altaf Hussain felt the fear that with the rise of Afaq Ahmed, his politics might fail. Afaq Ahmed was arrested in 2004 following the rise to power of the rival MQM in Sindh. Several allegations and cases were charged on him which later proved to be false. In late September 2011, the Sindh High Court finally granted Ahmed bail seven years after his arrest. The Sindh government refused to grant his release, citing concerns over the maintenance of law and order. On 16 December 2011, the Sindh High Court declared Ahmed's imprisonment under Maintenance of Public Order (MPO) illegal and ordered him to be set free.
