= Azeem Ahmed Tariq =

Pakistani politician

- عظیم احمد طارق

Chairman of MQM
- In office 1984 – 1 May 1993

Personal details
- Born: 14 June 1944 Karachi, Pakistan
- Died: 1 May 1993 (aged 48) Karachi, Pakistan
- Cause of death: Assassination
- Party: MQM
- Other political affiliations: APMSO
- Occupation: Politician

Azeem Ahmed Tariq (Urdu: عظیم احمد طارق) (14 June 1944 - 1 May 1993) was a Pakistani politician who was the chairman and one of the founding members of MQM (Muhajir Qaumi Movement) and its student wing APMSO (All Pakistan Muttahidda Students Organization). The party was formed to fight for the rights of the Mohajir people in Sindh.

== Assassination ==
Tariq was murdered in his Karachi home on 1 May 1993. At around 3 in the morning, intruders came into the house, picked his bedroom lock and fired multiple rounds as he slept on the floor of his drawing room.
