= Amir Khan (politician) =

Pakistani politician

- عامر خان
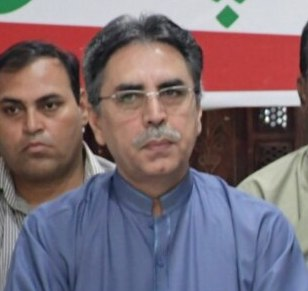

Secretary General of MQM-H
- In office 1992–2011
- Chairman: Afaq Ahmed

Personal details
- Born: Karachi, Sindh, Pakistan
- Occupation: Politician

Aamir Khan (Urdu: عامر خان) is a Pakistani politician who is the senior deputy convenor and leader of MQM-P.

== Political career ==
Khan started his career as a worker of MQM and its student wing APMSO.

In 1992, because of having ideological differences with MQM founder Altaf Hussain, Khan alongside Afaq Ahmed co-founded Muhajir Qaumi Movement – Haqiqi, a rival faction of much larger of then Muhajir Qaumi Movement which was later renamed to Muttahida Qaumi Movement as its first secretary general.

In 2011, after suffering a long political survival as chief of MQM-H, he announced to rejoin MQM after seeking pardon from MQM founder Altaf Hussain because of his political insurgency against him in 1990s.

In August 2016, after the controversial speeches of MQM founder Altaf Hussain, he alongside Farooq Sattar and other Pakistan-based leaders of MQM distances themselves from this scenario and Sattar announced formation of MQM Pakistan splitting away from its MQM's London based leadership for which Khan was appointed as its senior deputy convenor and core committee member.

In February 2018, after having differences with Sattar over the allocations of party tickets for 2018 Pakistani Senate election, MQM-P further divided into Farooq MQM-Pakistan (PIB faction) led by Sattar and MQM-Pakistan (Bahadurabad) factions led by Khan whose convenor later became Khalid Maqbool Siddiqui.

== See also ==
- Muhajir Qaumi Movement – Haqiqi
- Afaq Ahmed
- Muttahida Qaumi Movement – Pakistan
- Muttahida Qaumi Movement – London
