= United Student Movement =

United Student Movement was united front of several left-wing student federations in Pakistan. It was founded around 1980. It included All Pakistan Muhajir Students Organisation, Baloch Students Federation, Democratic Students Federation, National Students Federation, and Peoples Students Federation. Its main opponent in elections was the right-wing Islami Jamiat Talaba (IJT). NOTE - the references cited in the sections cite different dates (1979 and 1981) and a slightly different list of original member organisations.
