= Shoaib Mohammad =

Pakistani cricketer (born 1961)

Personal information
- Born: 8 January 1961 (age 65); Karachi, Sindh, Pakistan
- Batting: Right-handed
- Bowling: Right-arm offbreak
- Relatives: Hanif Mohammad (father); Shehzar Mohammad (son)

International information
- National side: Pakistan
- Test debut (cap 97): 24 September 1983 v India
- Last Test: 26 September 1995 v Sri Lanka
- ODI debut (cap 52): 23 November 1984 v New Zealand
- Last ODI: 02 March 1993 v Zimbabwe

Career statistics
Competition	Test	ODI
Matches	45	63
Runs scored	2,705	1,269
Batting average	44.34	24.40
100s/50s	7/13	1/8
Top score	203*	126*
Balls bowled	396	919
Wickets	5	20
Bowling average	34.00	36.25
5 wickets in innings	0	0
10 wickets in match	0	n/a
Best bowling	2/8	3/20
Catches/stumpings	22/–	13/–
- Source: ESPNcricinfo, 4 February 2006

Shoaib Mohammad (Urdu: شعیب محمد; born 8 January 1961) is a Pakistani former cricketer who played in 45 Tests and 63 ODIs from 1983 to 1995. Shoaib is the son of Pakistan national cricket team's former captain Hanif Mohammad. Shoaib was a right-handed batsman who represented the country until the mid-1990s. Even after his retirement, Shoaib remained engaged in the development of cricket in Pakistan and coached and took trials on behalf of the Pakistan Cricket Board. On February 11, 2014, he was appointed the fielding coach of the national team. His son Shehzar Mohammad played as a right-handed batsman and wicket-keeper for Pakistan International Airlines.

== Test career ==
Shoaib Mohammad started his Test career in 1983 against India at Jalandhar, but he could not score much in this Test. He also managed to score only 9 runs in an innings. He scored 80 runs against England next year. At the end of the year, he scored 31 and 34 against New Zealand in Karachi. He scored his maiden century against India in Pakistan's tour of India in 1986–87. He pulled off 101 and 46 in the 1st Test. Taking after his father's batting style Shoaib was an orthodox opener with a chequered career with largely successful against New Zealand and India as all his 7 Test centuries came against these opponents. He was in his element against India in 1989–90 season scoring his career best 202. In 1990 he was prolific against a depleted New Zealand with three consecutive centuries in 3 Tests.

== Career statistics ==
Shoaib Mohammad remained unbeaten seven times in 68 innings of 45 Test matches and scored 2705 runs at an average of 44.34. It included 7 centuries and 13 half-centuries. His highest individual score was 203 not out. Similarly, he remained unbeaten six times in 58 innings of 63 ODIs and completed 1269 runs at an average of 24.40. 126 unbeaten was his maximum score of one innings. One century and eight half-centuries were also recovered from his bat. Shoaib Mohammad also played in 211 first-class matches in which he remained unbeaten 44 times in 350 innings and scored 12682 runs at an average of 41.44 with 38 centuries and 57 half-centuries. 208 unbeaten runs was the best score of any one of his innings. Shoaib Mohammad took 5 wickets in Test matches, 20 in ODIs and 45 in First Class matches. He also caught 22 catches in Test matches, 13 in ODIs and 93 catches in First Class matches

== Family members ==
Shoaib is a member of a well-known cricketing dynasty in Pakistan. His father, Hanif Muhammad, was one of the five Mohammad brothers, four of whom (Wazir, Mushtaq, Sadiq and Hanif himself) played Test cricket for Pakistan. Hanif's fifth brother Raees was once twelfth man for Pakistan, and four of Hanif's nephews had first-class careers. Hanif's mother Ameer Bee was a national badminton champion in pre-independence British India.
