= Zafar H. Naqvi =

- Born: 30 November 1945 (age 80); Faizabad, United Provinces, British India
- Military career
- Allegiance: Pakistan
- Branch: Pakistan Army
- Service years: 1964–1996
- Rank: Major General
- Unit: Artillery Corps
- Commands: 5th Light Air Defence Unit; 103rd Air Defence Brigade; 4th Army Air Defence Division
- Conflicts: Indo-Pakistani War of 1971; Battle of Barapind; Dir operation

Syed Zafar Ul Hasan Naqvi (born 30 November 1945) is a general of the Pakistan Army.

== Military career ==
Naqvi joined the Pakistan Army in 1966 during the war with India and was commissioned as a second lieutenant in 1966, graduating from the Pakistan Military Academy's 37th long course.

=== Military promotion ===
After receiving his commission Naqvi rose quickly through the ranks. He became a major only five years after passing out from the Military Academy. As a major he held a number of posts, the most notable being the brigade major of an infantry brigade, even though he was a part of the artillery corps. Later, he graduated from the highly esteemed Command and Staff College in Quetta.

=== Indo-Pakistan War of 1971 ===
During the Indo-Pakistani War of 1971 Naqvi was stationed in Shakargarh and Zafarwal area, which saw some of the heaviest fighting during the war in what has since become known as the Battle of Barapind.

=== Dir operation of 1976 ===
He also participated in a number of important military operations, the most prominent one being the Dir operation which was conducted in the North Western Frontier Province of Pakistan. After this he was promoted to the rank of lieutenant colonel and was transferred to the newly formed Army Air Defence corps.

== Army Air Defence commander ==
Between 1980–81, Naqvi commanded a Light Air Defence Unit and this unit was the first unit of Air Defence which was inspected by Quaid-e-Azam before being promoted two ranks to become a brigadier. In this position, Naqvi was placed in command of the largest brigade of the Pakistan Army. Later, he commanded a number of air defence brigades, as well as studying at the National Defence University in Islamabad, from where he passed out with honours.

Following this Naqvi took command of an Air Defence Brigade in Karachi. In 1995 he became commander of an Army Air Defence Division.

== See also ==
- Barapind
