= Raees Mohammad =

Pakistani cricketer (1932–2022)

Personal information
- Born: 25 December 1932; Junagadh, Junagadh State, British India
- Died: 14 February 2022 (aged 89); Karachi, Pakistan
- Batting: Right-handed
- Bowling: Right-arm legbreak, googly
- Role: Batsman
- Relatives: Wazir Mohammad (brother); Hanif Mohammad (brother); Mushtaq Mohammad (brother); Sadiq Mohammad (brother); Asif Mohammad (son); Shoaib Mohammad (nephew)

Domestic team information
- Years: Team
- 1953/54–1961/62: Karachi
- 1959/60: Peshawar

Career statistics
| Competition | First-class |
|---|---|
| Matches | 30 |
| Runs scored | 1,344 |
| Batting average | 32.78 |
| 100s/50s | 2/8 |
| Top score | 118* |
| Balls bowled | 1,032 |
| Wickets | 33 |
| Bowling average | 31.27 |
| 5 wickets in innings | 0 |
| 10 wickets in match | 0 |
| Best bowling | 4/82 |
| Catches/stumpings | 21/– |
- Source: ESPNcricinfo, 14 March 2013

Raees Mohammad (Urdu: رئيس محمد; 25 December 1932 – 14 February 2022) was a Pakistani cricketer who played in 30 first-class matches from 1948 to 1963. A right-handed batsman and leg-spinner, he scored 1,344 runs including two centuries, and took 33 wickets. He was one of the five Mohammad brothers, four of whom (Wazir, Hanif, Mushtaq and Sadiq) played Test cricket for Pakistan. Former Test cricketer Shoaib Mohammad is his nephew.

== Personal life ==
Raees came from a large and famous Pakistani cricketing family. His brothers, Wazir Mohammad, Hanif Mohammad, Mushtaq Mohammad and Sadiq Mohammad played Test cricket for Pakistan. His nephew, Shoaib Mohammad, also represented Pakistan at Test level, as well as playing One Day International cricket. His son, Asif Mohammad, played first-class and List A cricket.

He died in Karachi on 14 February 2022, at the age of 89.

== Career ==
Raees started his first-class career for Karachi and Sind against Commonwealth XI in December 1949 at Karachi Gymkhana Ground. He played his next match against the rest in March 1953 in which he scored 8 and 66 runs. In the next two seasons, Raees played eight matches, aggregating 603 runs, including his career best 118 not out against Sind. He also took 15 wickets in the 1954–55 season. In the final match of the 1954–55 Quaid-i-Azam Trophy, he made his second century, 110 not out, against the Combined Services. He also achieved his best bowling performance in the match, taking four wickets for 82.

In the same season, he was named 12th man for the Dhaka Test match against India, the first ever hosted by Pakistan.

From 1955 to 1958, he played nine matches, scored 341 runs averaged under 25 and took 10 catches.

During Raees' next three seasons—1959–60, 1960–61 and 1961–62—he played in two, one and three matches scoring 68, 12 and 117 runs respectively; his highest score remained 73 against Karachi Blues, in the semi-final of the 1961–62 Quaid-i-Azam Trophy. He played for the last time in the 1962–63 Pakistani domestic season, playing five matches, scoring 192 runs at the average of above 27, including a half century. In all, Raees played 30 first-class matches and scored 1,344 runs at the average of 32.78, including two centuries and eight half centuries. He also took 33 wickets and 21 catches.
