= Jamshed Ayaz Khan =

- Born: Jamshed Ayaz Khan
- Military career
- Allegiance: Pakistan
- Branch: Pakistan Army
- Rank: Major General
- Other work: President of the Institute of Regional Studies; Additional Secretary for Defence Production in the Ministry of Defence

Jamshed Ayaz Khan, HI(M) (Urdu: جمشید ایاز خان) was a Pakistani defence and security analyst and retired military general who has served as the president of the Institute of Regional Studies (IRS) think tank. Khan was also the Additional Secretary for Defence Production in the Ministry of Defence.

== Career ==
He completed his education from the prestigious St Patrick's High School in Karachi, and from the Pakistan Military Academy in Kakul. Later, he obtained a master's degree in War Studies from the National Defence College.

He had written and spoken extensively for various media organisations and publications on issues relating to Pakistan's domestic geostrategic affairs as well as security and foreign policy. Khan was a supporter of Pakistan increasing its economic and geopolitical relations with Iran and other regional friends and has been a critic of American policies in the region.

He retired from the army in 2001 following a 39-year-long career. For his services in the army, he was awarded the Hilal-i-Imtiaz. He is a member of the International Institute for Strategic Studies in London, the Asia Society based in New York, and Rotary International. His name was listed in the International Who's Who list for 2006-07.

== Publications ==
Texts authored by Jamshed Ayaz Khan include:

- Asia: Search for Security and Cooperation (2006)
- Reflections on Matters of War and Peace (2003)
