= Rehmat Farrukhabadi =

Muhammad Rehmatullah
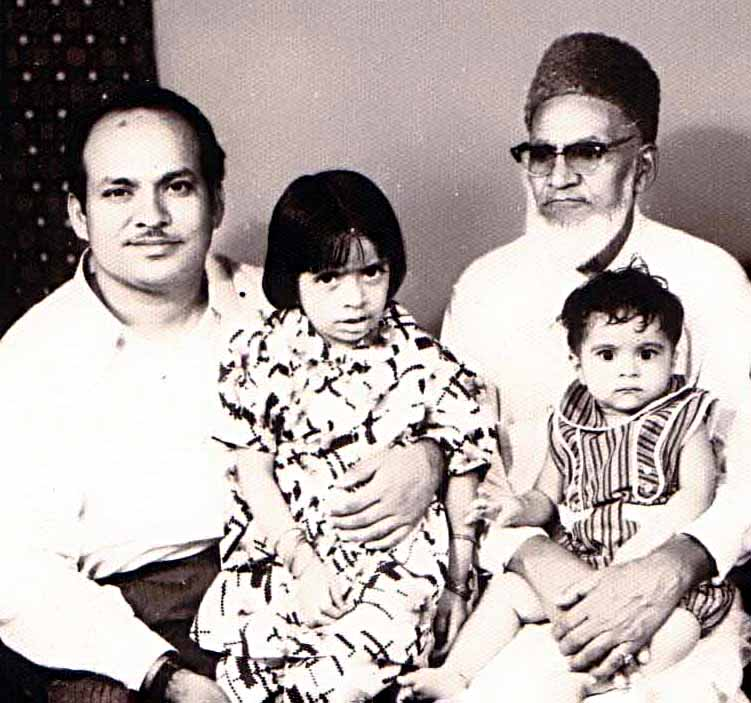
- Prof. Muhammad Rehmatullah with his father and daughter and son
- Born: 7 July 1942; Farrukhabad, Uttar Pradesh, British India
- Died: 9 August 1993 (aged 51); Sukkur, Sindh Pakistan
- Other name: Rehmat Farrukhabadi
- Citizenship: Pakistan
- Education: University of Sindh, Jamshoro
- Known for: "Muhammad Ali Jauhar and the Mutiny Trial" in Urdu (Karachi: Oxford University Press, 2005; ISBN 9780195978940)
- Awards: Gold Medal in M.A. Muslim History
- Scientific career
- Fields: Muslim History Muslim Culture
- Workplaces: Govt Islamia Arts & Commerce College, Sukkur
- Doctoral advisor: Prof. Dr. Syed Moizuddin

Rehmat Farrukhabadi (born 7 July 1942, Farrukhabad, Uttar Pradesh, India; died 9 August 1993, Sukkur, Sindh Pakistan) (Urdu: رحمت فرخ آبادی) is the pen name of Muhammad Rehmatullah Qureshi (Urdu: پروفیسر محمد رحمت اللہ قریشی), a Pakistani author and Muslim scholar. He wrote more than 250 papers, including 77 research papers those published in recognised journals.

== Early life and education ==
Qureshi was born in Farrukhabad, Uttar Pradesh, India in 1942. Following the independence of Pakistan in 1947, his family emigrated to Pakistan. Qureshi's mother died while he was still a child; his father worked as an accountant. He studied at the Railway Boys' High School in Sukkur and then attended the Government Islamia College Arts and Sciences in Sukkur for intermediate then he went University of Sindh where he received an MA degree in Muslim History in 1965 with gold medal. Finally, he received an MA degree in Islamic Culture from the same university in 1967.

== Family ==
Qureshi married Amina, they had four children Azra, Muhammad Zafarullah Qureshi, Salma and Muhammad Atherullah. Muhammad Zafarullah (MS-NEDUET, Karachi) is now working as lecturer in mathematics at D. J. Sindh Govt. Science College, Karachi and PhD Scholar at the University of Karachi, and Muhammad Atherullah at working in Associate Press of Pakistan, Sukkur Region, while their both daughters are housewives. After Qureshi death, his wife Amina died on Friday, 20 May 2005.

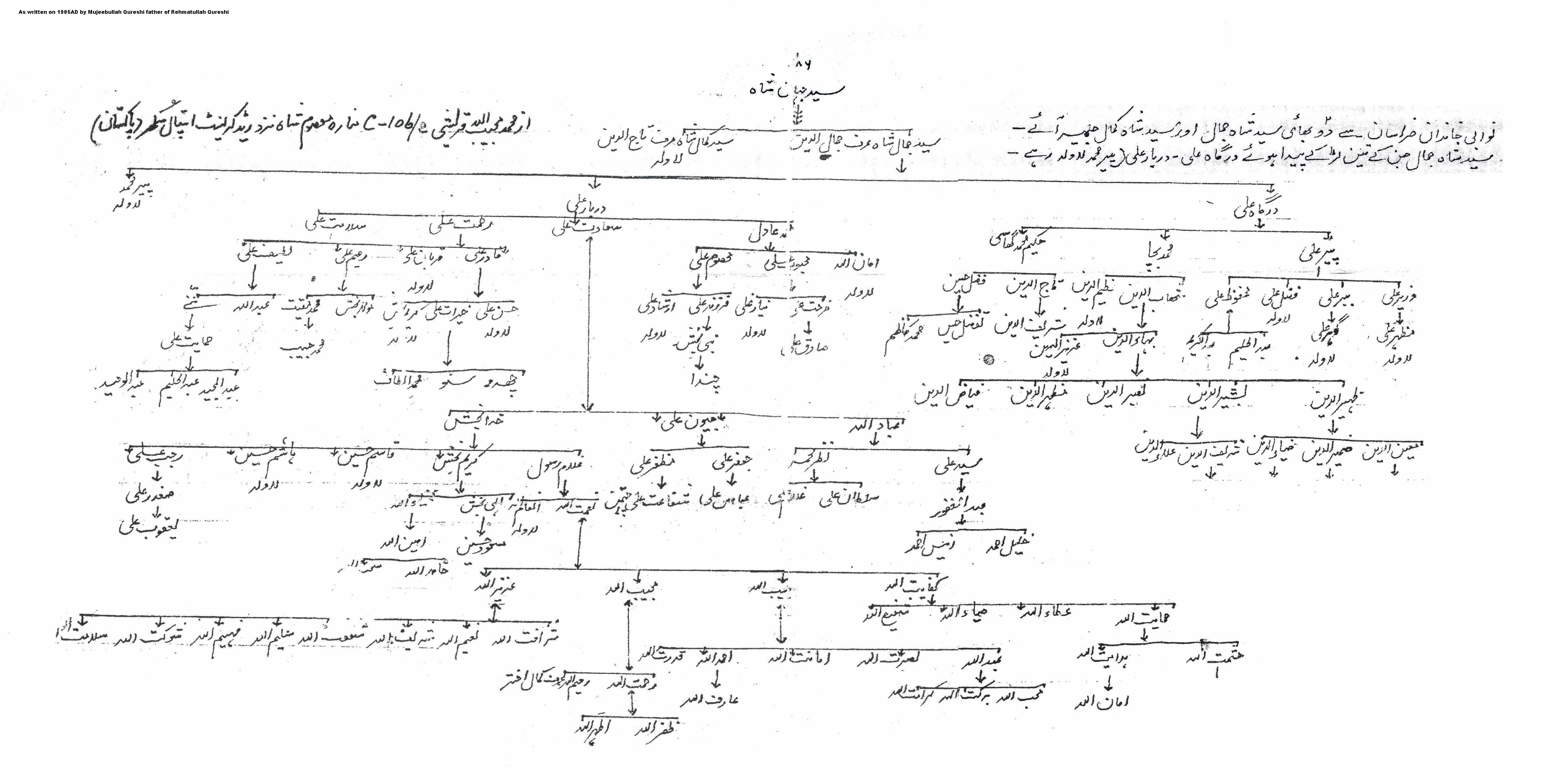
Family Tree made by Mujeebullah father of Prof Muhammad Rehmatullah on 1985AD

== Career ==
Qureshi joined as lecturer in Muslim history at Islamia College Sukkur in 1966, promoted as assistant professor of Muslim history in Govt. Islamia Arts & Commerce College, Sukkur in 1984 and then associate professor.

He taught postgraduate classes in the same college during the period 1966–67 to 1993. He served as associate processor at the Government Islamia Arts & Commerce College until his death in 1993.

He wrote more than 250 papers, including 77 research papers those published in recognised journals.

== Books ==
Qureshi's published books include:

- محمد علی جوہر ۱ور مقدمہِ بغاوت [Muhammad Ali Jauhar and the Mutiny Trial] in Urdu (Karachi: Oxford University Press, 2005; ISBN 9780195978940)
- اقبال اور عورت [Iqbal and Women] in Urdu (Sukkur: Ajaib, 1962)
- تاریخِ سیاستِ سندھ [Political History of Sindh] in Urdu (Sukkur: Ajaib, 1962)
- اسلامک کلچر حصہ اوّل [Islamic Culture Part I] in Urdu (Sukkur: Ajaib, 1962)
- اسلامک کلچر حصہ دوم [Islamic Culture Part II] in Urdu (Sukkur: Ajaib, 1962)
- جغرافیہِ صوبہِ سندھ [Geography of Sindh Province] in Urdu (Sukur: Ajaib, 1974)
- سندھ میں اردو [Urdu in Sindh] in Urdu (Islamabad: National Language Authority, 1988)
- امیرانِ تالپر کے علمی کارنامے [Academic Achievement of Talpur Chiefs] in Urdu (Karachi: All Pakistan Education Conference 1988)
- رسولِ اكرم كى مكئ زندگی [Life of Muhammad in Makkah] in Urdu
- اقبال کا تصور حیات [Iqbal's Ideology about Life] in Urdu
- جنگِ آزادی ۱۸۵۷ء اور سندھ [Indian Rebellion of 1857 and Sindh] in Urdu
- مقالاتِ مولاعی شیداعی [Moulai Shedai's Articles] in Urdu
- مشاہیرِ تحریکِ تاریخِ پاکستان [Dignitaries of the history of the Pakistan Moment] in Urdu
- مشاہیرِ تاریخِ سندھ [Dignitaries of the history of Sindh] in Urdu
- سندھ کے مسلمان حکمرانوں کے علمی کارنامے [Academic achievements of Muslim rulers of Sindh] in Urdu
- مولانا شوکت علی - حیات اور خدمات [Maulana Shaukat Ali - live and Services] in Urdu
- مسلمان مورخین: ایک جاءزه [Muslim historians: An overview] in Urdu
- فنِ تاریخ نگاری [Art of Historiography] in Urdu

Additionally, Qureshi published more than 150 papers published in Urdu, English and Sindhi journals and magazines, including more than 30 research papers
