= Nasim Amrohvi =

Urdu poet, philosopher, and lexicographer (1908–1987)

- Born: August 24, 1908; Amroha, British India
- Died: February 28, 1987 (aged 78)
- Occupations: Pakistani Urdu poet, philosopher, lexicographer
- Writing career
- Language: Urdu
- Notable works: Khutbat-e-Mushiran (1942), Adabī kahāniyān, Nasīm ul-lug̲h̲āt, Urdū, Dust banu dust bana'u, Risālah tauz̤ih al-masāʼil, Mūmin-i āl-i Ibrāhīm, Musaddas-i Nasīm, Farhang-i Iqbāl, Urdū lug̲h̲at : tārīk̲h̲ī uṣūl par, Mars̲iyah-yi Josh, Cashmah-yi g̲h̲am, ʻAllāmah Iqbāl ke cāron̲ davāvīn, Nazm-e-Urdu

Nasim Amrohvi or Syed Qaim Raza Taqvi (Urdu: نسیم امروہوی, romanized: Allamah Nasīm Amrohvī; (24 August 1908 – 28 February 1987) was a Pakistani Urdu poet, philosopher, and lexicographer who was born as Syed Qaim Raza Taqvi on 24 August 1908 in Amroha, British India.

He belonged to a Taqvi Syed family. His father was Syed Barjees Hussain Taqvi and his mother was Syeda Khatoon. His grandfather was Shamim Amrohvi who was bestowed the title Farazdaq-e-Hind (lit. "India's Farazdaq").

In 1950, he migrated to Pakistan after the partition of India in 1947, settling in Khairpur. He moved to Karachi in 1961 and eventually died there on 28 February 1987.

== Work ==
Nasim Amrohvi was a member of the Urdu Lughat Board. Over several years, he compiled an Urdu dictionary entitled Nasim-ul-Lughat. For each word, Nasim-ul-Lughat provides not only its meaning, usage, and related proverbs but also the verses containing it. Besides being a lexicographer, he also wrote Marsiya.

== Books ==
Some of his major works include:

- Khutbat-e-Mushiran (1942)
- Adabī kahāniyān̲
- Nasīm ul-lug̲h̲āt, Urdū
- Dust banu dust bana'u
- Risālah tauz̤ih al-masāʼil. Translation of a book on Shīʻah doctrines by Abū al-Qāsim ibn ʻAlī Akbar al-Khūʼī
- Mūmin-i āl-i Ibrāhīm. Two poems on Shiite themes
- Musaddas-i Nasīm. On the prophet Muhammad
- Farhang-i Iqbāl. Large book on the philosophy of Sir Muhammad Iqbal, 1877-1938, national poet of Pakistan
- Urdū lug̲h̲at : tārīk̲h̲ī uṣūl par. Dictionary of Urdu language
- Mars̲iyah-yi Josh. Elegy on the death of Josh Malihabadi (1896-1982), Urdu poet of Pakistan
- Cashmah-yi g̲h̲am. Elegies, chiefly on the martyrs of the battle of Karbala
- ʻAllāmah Iqbāl ke cāron̲ davāvīn. Dictionary of terms used in the works of Sir Muhammad Iqbal, 1877-1938, national poet of Pakistan
- Nazm-e-Urdu
