= Atif Tauqeer =

Pakistani Journalist

- عاطف توقیر
- Born: 23 July 1979 (age 47); Jhelum
- Education: University of Karachi; University of Bonn
- Occupations: Journalist, poet, writer, vlogger

Atif Tauqeer (Urdu: عاطف توقیر; born 23 July 1979) is a Pakistani journalist, poet, writer, vlogger and media researcher based in Germany.

== Education ==
Tauqeer got his bachelor's degree in political science and master's degree in mass communication from the University of Karachi. In 2012 he got a master's degree in international media studies from the University of Bonn, Germany.

== Poetry ==
Atif Tauqeer has been an Urdu poet since the early 1990s but was first noticed when he wrote his famous poem “Shukria” in October 1999 in the context of Pakistani military general Pervez Musharraf’s martial law. In that poem he criticizes the military’s role in politics. Many of his poems have

- "Aytaraf" (Confession)
- "Talibani Darinday" (Tablian Beasts)
- "Mutaliba" (Demand)
