= Muhajir (Pakistan) =

Multi-origin ethnic group of Pakistan

Muhajirs
مہاجر
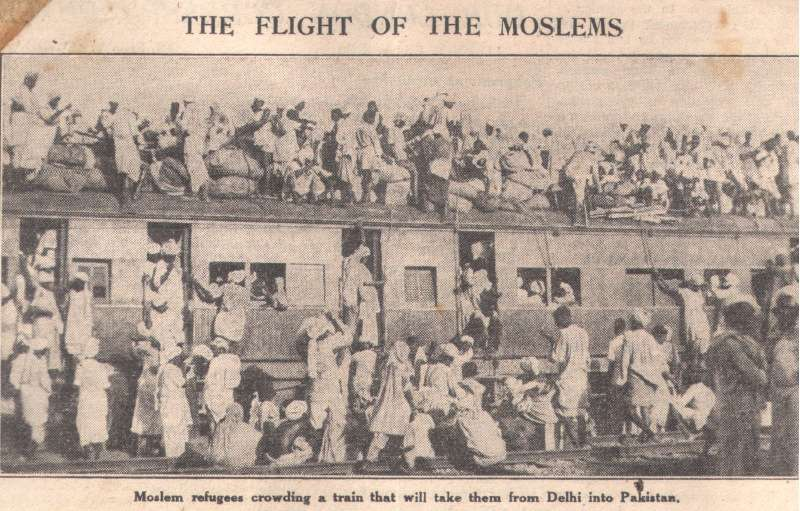
- Photo from The Manchester Guardian of a group of Muslim migrants boarding a Pakistan-bound train in Delhi amidst the partition of India, c. 1947–1953

Total population
- c. 15 million

Regions with significant populations
- Pakistan: 14,703,744 (2017 census) (Note: 7.08% of Pakistan's population)
- Bangladesh: 300,000 (Note: 0.18% of Bangladesh's population)
- United Kingdom: 269,000
- United States: 188,983
- United Arab Emirates: 80,000
- Canada: 74,405
- Australia: 69,131
- Saudi Arabia: 53,000

Languages
- Urdu (native language of the majority) Other languages: Gujarati, Memoni, Rajasthani languages, and others (spoken by minorities)

Religion
- Islam

The Muhajir people (also spelled Mohajir and Mahajir; Urdu: مہاجر) are a multi-origin ethnic group of Pakistan. They are the Muslim immigrants of various ethnic groups and regional origins, who migrated from various regions of India, mostly after the 1947 independence to settle in the newly independent state of Pakistan, and their descendants. Muhajirs come from various ethnic and regional backgrounds, with a significant portion of the community residing in Karachi and other major urban centers of Pakistan.

The total population of Muhajrs worldwide is estimated to be around 15 million, and the overwhelming majority of this figure (14.7 million) is located in Pakistan, according to the 2017 Pakistani census. Though the official controversial 2017 census of Karachi, which has historically hosted the country's largest Muhajir population, has been challenged by most of Sindh's political parties.

== Etymology ==
The Urdu term muhājir (Urdu: مہاجر) comes from the Arabic muhājir (Arabic: مهاجر), meaning an "immigrant", or "emigrant". This term is associated in early Islamic history to the migration of Muslims and connotes 'separation, migration, flight, specifically the flight of the Prophet from Mecca to Medina'. This term was popularised in Pakistan by the 1951 census, although its earliest uses date back to Partition.

== Demographics ==
=== Origins ===
Most of the Muhajirs who settled in the Sindh province of Pakistan came from the present-day Indian states of Central Provinces, Berar, Bombay, United Provinces, Haryana, Gujarat, Himachal Pradesh, Bihar and Delhi, while others were from princely states of Jammu and Kashmir, Rajasthan, Hyderabad, Baroda, Kutch, and the Rajputana Agency.

=== Population ===
Muhajirs, worldwide, have a population of over 15 million. Urdu-speaking Muhajirs are mostly settled in Pakistan and currently are the fifth-largest ethnic group of Pakistan, with a population of around 7.6% of the national population, according to the census. Although the population figures of the Muhajir dominated city of Karachi, have faced many controversies mainly due to the controversial 2017 census of Pakistan. The population figure has been rejected by most major political parties of Sindh including MQM-P, PSP, and PPP.

Estimates of Muhajir nationalist organizations range from 22 million to around 30 million. Conversely, Christophe Jaffrelot gives a lower number, estimating their modern population to number between 7 and 9 millions, mostly in Karachi. The variation in population estimates arises from differing definitions: the term Muhajir as an ethnic group typically refers to descendants of migrants from present-day India, whereas the broader category of Urdu speakers may also include millions of individuals, particularly ethnic Punjabis in major urban centers, who now speak Urdu as their first language.

Historically, Muhajirs have constituted above 7% population of West Pakistan (3.5% in Pakistan as a whole).

=== Languages ===
Being a multi-linguistic group of people, the Muhajirs speak different languages natively depending on their ethnicity and ancestral history.

==== Urdu ====
Most Muhajirs speak Urdu, the third-largest Urdu-speaking population in the world. In Sindh, those that speak Urdu as first language mostly migrated from Delhi, United Provinces, Hyderabad Deccan, Bombay, Ajmer, Bhopal, Bihar, Karnal including from other regions with other native tongues who eventually assimilated into the community amid nation building.

In Punjab, although most migrants were of East Punjab origin and Punjabi speakers, a sizeable number of native Urdu-speaking communities also migrated to its urban centres mainly from Delhi, Alwar, Bharatpur, Jodhpur, Mewat and UP.

==== Gujarati ====
There is a large community of Gujarati Muhajirs mainly settled in the Pakistani province of Sindh. Estimates say there are 3,500,000 speakers of the Gujarati language in Karachi. Although the Gujaratis speak their own language, they tend to identify with the Urdu-speakers This group includes Muhammad Ali Jinnah, Abdul Sattar Edhi, Javed Miandad, Abdul Razzak Yaqoob, I. I. Chundrigar, and Ahmed Dawood.

==== Others ====
Non-Urdu speaking Muslim peoples from what is now the Republic of India, such as Marathi, Konkani, 60,000 Rajasthanis who speak the Marwari dialect of Rajasthani language and several-thousand Malabari Muslims from Kerala in South India, are considered Muhajirs. These ethno-linguistic groups are being assimilated in the Urdu-speaking community.

Many dialects related to Urdu such as Khari Boli, and Deccani or other languages like Awadhi, Mewati, Bhojpuri, Memoni, Kutchi, Rajasthani, Magahi, Konkani, Marathi and Sadri, are also spoken by the Muhajirs.

== Geographic distribution ==
=== In Pakistan ===
Distribution of Urdu-speaking Muhajirs in Pakistan as per 2017 census.

There are an estimated 14.7 million Urdu speakers presumably mostly of Muhajir origin in Pakistan. Most of them are settled in the towns and cities of Pakistan mainly those of Urban Sindh, such as Karachi, Hyderabad, Mirpur Khas and Sukkur. Muhajir pockets are also found in other metropolizes of Pakistan such as Islamabad and Lahore.

Percent of Urdu speakers by administrative unit
Administrative units of Pakistan	Population	%
Balochistan	12,335,129	0.81%
Islamabad Capital Territory	2,003,368	12.23%
Khyber Pakhtunkhwa	35,501,964	0.9%
Punjab	110,012,442	4.87%
Sindh	47,854,510	18.2%
Pakistan	232,675,212	7.08%

=== In Bangladesh ===
A large number of Urdu-speaking Muslims from Bihar went to East Pakistan after the independence of India and Pakistan. After the formation of Bangladesh in 1971, the Biharis maintained their loyalty to Pakistan and wanted to leave Bangladesh for Pakistan. The majority of these people still await repatriation, however. About 178,000 have been repatriated. In 2015, the Pakistani government stated that the remaining 'Stranded Pakistanis' are not its responsibility but rather the responsibility of Bangladesh. Nearly 300,000 Biharis are currently settled in the urban areas of Bangladesh. These muhajirs are settled mainly in Shahjahan Pur, Kamla Pur, Motijheel, Purana Pultan, Nawabpur road, Nawab Bari, Thatheri Bazar, Moulvi Bazar, Armani Tola, Islam Pur, Azim Pur, Saddar Ghat, Eskatan, Dhanmandi, Dhakeshwari, Neel Khet. In 2003, these Muhajirs were granted nationality and the right to vote.

== History ==
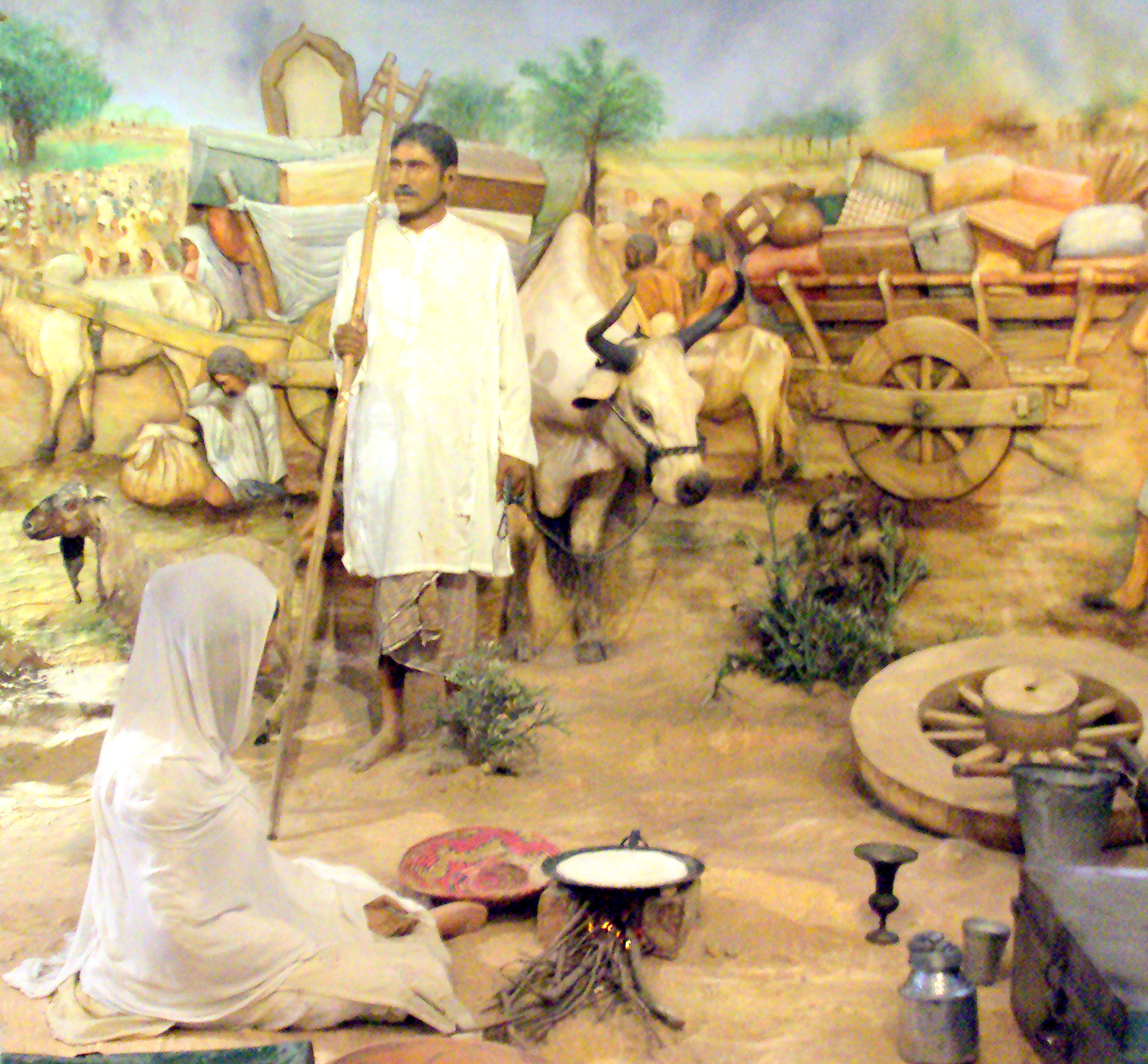
The photo monument depicting a couple migrating from India to Pakistan with their household stuff and cattle during the Partition of India.

The Partition of India caused the largest migration in human history. Many Muslims in parts of present-day India were persecuted by Hindus and Sikhs, while many Hindus and Sikhs in present-day Pakistan were persecuted by Muslims. After the independence of Pakistan, a significant number of Muslims emigrated or were out-migrated from the territory that became the Dominion of India and later the Republic of India. In the aftermath of partition, a huge population exchange occurred between the two newly formed states. In the riots which preceded the partition, between 200,000 and 2,000,000 people were killed in the retributive genocide. UNHCR estimates 14 million Hindus, Sikhs, and Muslims were displaced during the partition; it was the largest mass migration in human history.

=== First immigration wave (August–November 1947) ===
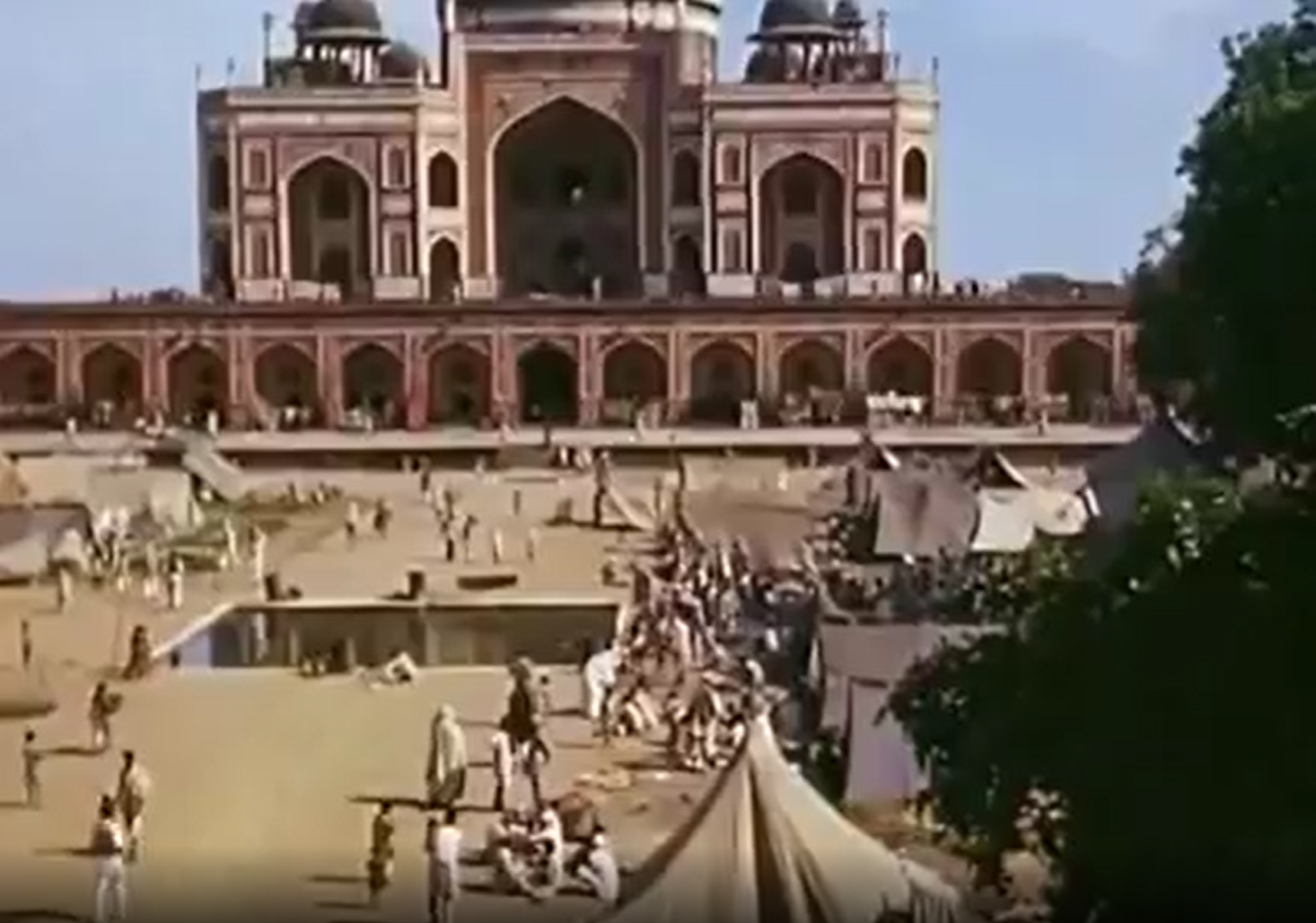
Muslim refugees in the Tomb of Humayun, 1947

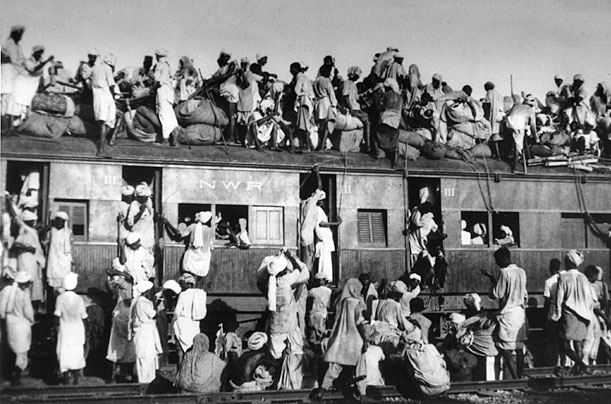
Muslim refugees boarding a train in September 1947, similar to those involved in the massacre, with the intent of fleeing India

There were three predominant stages of Muslim migration from India to West Pakistan. The first stage lasted from August–November 1947. In this stage of migration the Muslim immigrants originated from East Punjab, Delhi, the four adjacent districts of U.P., and the princely states of Alwar and Bharatpur which are now part of the present-day Indian state of Rajasthan. The violence affecting these areas during partition precipitated an exodus of Muslims from these areas to Pakistan. Punjabi Muslims from East Punjab crossed to West Punjab and settled in a culturally and linguistically similar environment.

The migration to Sindh was of a different nature to that in Punjab, as the migrants to Sindh were ethnically heterogenous and were linguistically different from the locals. The migrants were also more educated than the native, and predominantly rural Sindhi Muslims who had been less educated and less prosperous than the former Sindhi Hindu residents, suffered as a result. The migrants, who were urban, also tended to regard the local Sindhis as "backwards" and subservient to landowners.

Prior to the partition, the majority of urban Sindh's population had been Hindu, but after the independence of Pakistan in 1947, the majority of Sindh's Hindus migrated to India, although a substantial number of Hindus did remain in Sindh. 1.1 million Muslims from Uttar Pradesh, Bombay Presidency, Delhi, and Rajasthan settled in their place; half in Karachi and the rest across Sindh's other cities. By the 1951 census, the migrants constituted 57 per cent of the population of Karachi, 65 per cent in Hyderabad, and 55 per cent in Sukkur. As Karachi was the capital of the new nation, educated urban migrants from Delhi, Uttar Pradesh, Bombay, Bihar, and Hyderabad Deccan preferred it as their site of settlement for better access to employment opportunities. The migrants were compensated for their properties lost in India by being granted the evacuee property left behind by the departing Hindus. A sizeable community of Malayali Muslims (the Mappila), originally from Kerala in South India, also settled in Karachi.

=== Second immigration wave (December 1947 – December 1971) ===
This film contrasts the old and new India and Pakistan, with emphasis on the Bangladesh and Kashmir disputes.

Many Muslim families from India continued migrating to Pakistan throughout the 1950s and even early 1960s. This second stage (December 1947 – December 1971) of the migration was from areas in the present-day Indian states of U.P., Delhi, Gujarat, Rajasthan, Maharashtra, Madhya Pradesh, Karnataka, Telangana, Andhra Pradesh, Tamil Nadu, and Kerala. The main destination of these migrants was Karachi and the other urban centers of Sindh.

In 1952, a joint passport system was introduced for travel purposes between the two countries which made it possible for Indian Muslims to legally move to Pakistan. Pakistan still required educated and skilled workers to absorb into its economy at the time, due to relatively low levels of education (15.9 per cent in 1961) in Pakistan. As late as December 1971, the Pakistan High Commission in New Delhi was authorized to issue documents to educationally-qualified Indians to migrate to Pakistan. The legal route was taken by unemployed but educated Indian Muslims seeking better fortunes, however poorer Muslims from India continued to go illegally via the Rajasthan-Sindh border until the 1965 India–Pakistan war when that route was shut. After the conclusion of the 1965 war, most Muslims who wanted to go to Pakistan had to go there via the East Pakistani-India border. Once reaching Dhaka, most made their way to the final destination-Karachi. However, not all managed to reach West Pakistan from East Pakistan.

In 1959, the International Labour Organization (ILO) published a report stating that between the period of 1951–1956, around 650,000 Muslims from India relocated to West Pakistan. However, Visaria (1969) raised doubts about the authenticity of the claims about Indian Muslim migration to Pakistan, since the 1961 Census of Pakistan did not corroborate these figures. However, the 1961 Census of Pakistan did incorporate a statement suggesting that there had been a migration of 800,000 people from India to Pakistan throughout the previous decade. Of those who had left for Pakistan, most never came back. The Indian Prime Minister Jawaharlal Nehru conveyed distress about the continued migration of Indian Muslims to West Pakistan:

There has...since 1950 been a movement of some Muslims from India to Western Pakistan through Jodhpur–Sindh via Khokhropar. Normally, traffic between India and West Pakistan was controlled by the permit system. But these Muslims going via Khokhropar went without permits to West Pakistan. From January 1952 to the end of September, 53,209 Muslim emigrants went via Khokhropar....Most of these probably came from the U.P. In October 1952, up to the 14th, 6,808 went by this route. After that Pakistan became much stricter on allowing entry on the introduction of the passport system. From 15 October to the end of October, 1,247 went by this route. From 1 November, 1,203 went via Khokhropar.

Indian Muslim migration to West Pakistan continued unabated despite the cessation of the permit system between the two countries and the introduction of the passport system between them.

=== Third immigration wave (1973–1990s) ===
The third stage, which lasted between 1973 and the 1990s, was when migration levels of Indian Muslims to Pakistan was reduced to its lowest levels since 1947. Indian Muslim migration to Pakistan had declined drastically by the 1970s, a trend noticed by the Pakistani authorities. In June 1995, Pakistan's interior minister, Naseerullah Babar, informed the National Assembly that between the period of 1973–1994, as many as 800,000 visitors came from India on valid travel documents, of which only 3,393 stayed. In a related trend, intermarriages between Indian and Pakistani Muslims have declined sharply. According to a November 1995 statement of Riaz Khokhar, the Pakistani High Commissioner in New Delhi, the number of cross-border marriages has declined from 40,000 a year in the 1950s and 1960s to barely 300 annually.

== Politics ==
The Muhajirs have started many socio-political groups in Pakistan such as the Muttahida Qaumi Movement under Altaf Hussain in 1984, the All Pakistan Muslim League under Pervez Musharraf, and Jamaat e Islami under Abul A'la Maududi.

=== British-era Khilafat Movement ===
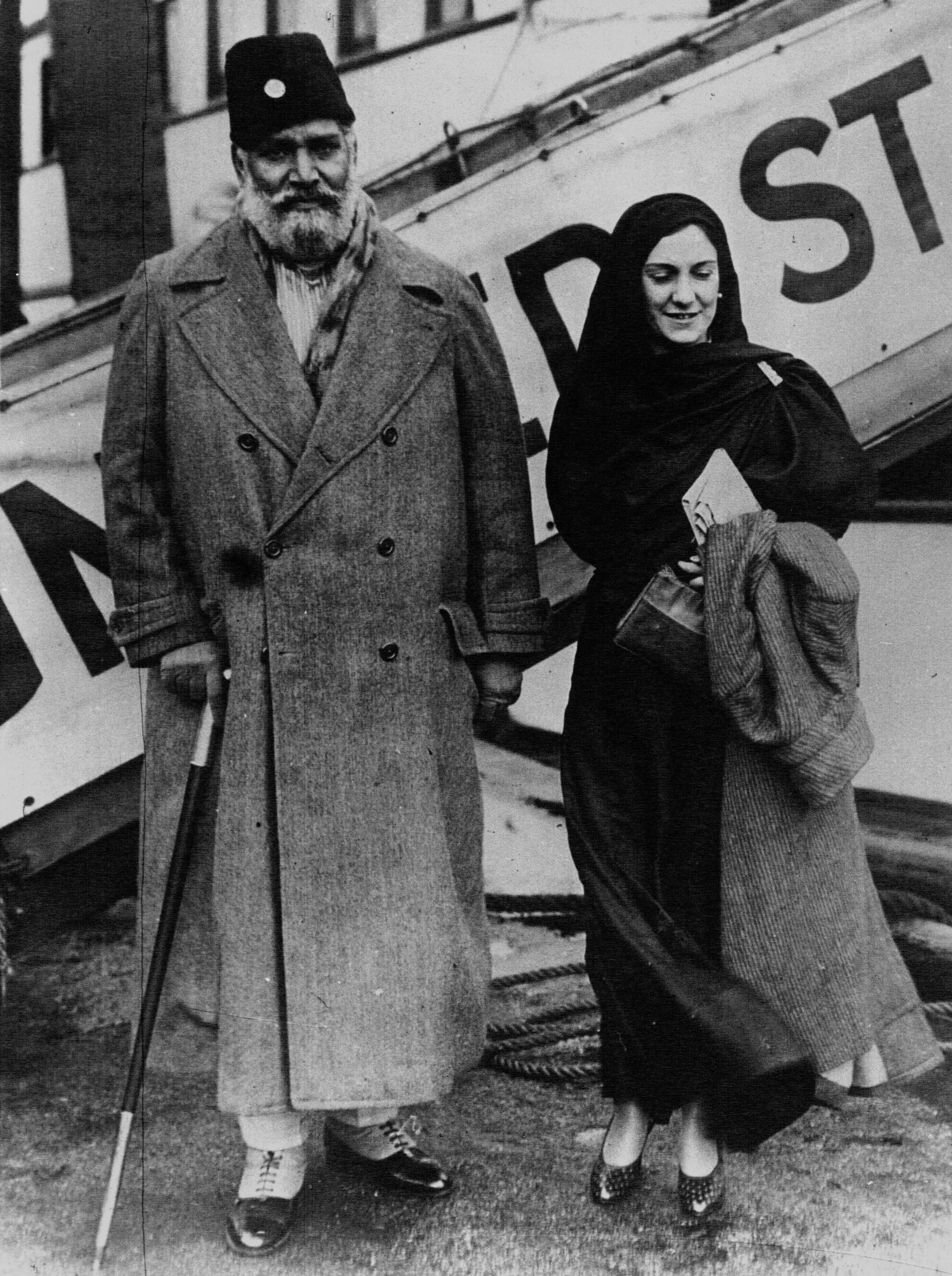
Maulana Shaukat Ali, a leader of the Khilafat Movement

During the last period of the Ottoman Empire, the empire was indebted and the community provided significant financial support to preserve the empire. The members of the movement who are now Muhajirs granted the money to preserve the Ottoman Empire but were unable to prevent its decline; it was the biggest political eminence in pre-Muhajir history.

==== Pakistan Movement ====
The Pakistan movement, to constitute a separate state comprising the Muslim-majority provinces, was supported by the Urdu-speaking Muslim elite and many notables of the Aligarh Movement. It was initiated in the 19th century when Sir Syed Ahmed Khan, the grandson of the Khwaja Fakhruddin, the Vizier of Akbar Shah II, expounded the cause of Muslim autonomy in Aligarh. In its early years, Muslim nobles such as nawabs (aristocrats and landed gentry) supported the idea, but as the idea spread, it gained great support among the Muslim population and in particular the rising middle and upper classes.

The Muslims launched the movement under the banner of the All India Muslim League and Delhi was its main centre. The headquarters of the All India Muslim League (the founding party of Pakistan) was based, since its creation in 1906, in Dhaka (present-day Bangladesh). The Muslim League won 90 per cent of reserved Muslim seats in the 1946 elections and its demand for the creation of Pakistan received overwhelming popular support among Indian Muslims, especially in those provinces of British India such as U.P. where Muslims were a minority.

=== 1947–1958 ===
The Muhajirs of Pakistan were largely settled in Sindh province, particularly in the province's capital, Karachi, where the Muhajirs were in a majority. As a result of their domination of major Sindhi cities, there had been tensions between Muhajirs and the native Sindhis, and this has been a major factor in the shaping of Muhajir politics. The Muhajirs, upon their arrival in Pakistan, soon joined the Punjabi-dominated ruling elite of the newborn country due to their high rates of education and urban background. They possessed the required expertise for running Pakistan's nascent bureaucracy and economy. Although the Muhajirs were, socially, urbane and liberal, they sided with the country's religious political parties such as Jamiat Ulema-i-Pakistan (JUP) because of their non affiliation with any particular ethnic group.

Upon arrival in Pakistan, the Muhajirs did not assert themselves as a separate ethnic identity, being multi-ethnic themselves, but were at the forefront of trying to construct an Islamic Pakistani identity. Muhajirs dominated the bureaucracy of Sindh in the early years of the Pakistani state, largely due to their higher levels of educational attainment. Prior to the partition, Hindus dominated the professions of lawyers, teachers, and tradesmen in Sindh and the vacancies they left behind were filled up by the Muhajirs.

Many upper class Muhajirs people had higher education and civil service experience from working for the British Raj and Muslim princely states. Out of the 101 Muslims in India's civil service, 95 chose to leave India. A third of those civil servants were West Punjabis and there were as many Muhajirs as Punjabis. From 1947 to 1958, the Urdu-speaking Muhajirs held more jobs in the Government of Pakistan than their proportion in the country's population (3.3%). In 1951, of the 95 senior civil services jobs, 33 were held by the Urdu-speaking Muhajirs and 40 by Punjabis. The Muhajirs also had a strong hold over the economy, 36 of the 42 largest private companies belonged to Muhajirs, mainly those from the Indian state of Gujarat.

Gradually, as education became more widespread, Sindhis and Pashtuns, as well as other ethnic groups, started to take their fair share of the pool in the bureaucracy. But even by the early 1960s, 34.5 per cent of Pakistan's civil servants were those who had not been born in the territory comprising Pakistan in 1947. Most of them were born in the United Provinces.

=== 1958–1970 ===
On 27 October 1958, General Ayub Khan staged a coup and imposed martial law across Pakistan. By the time of Pakistan's first military regime (Ayub Khan, 1958), the Muhajirs had already begun to lose their influence in the ruling elite, especially after he changed the federal capital of Karachi to Islamabad. Ayub slowly began to pull non-muhajirs into the mainstream areas of the economy and politics, coupled with completely ousting Muhajirs from the ruling elite. This caused the Muhajirs' to agitate against the Ayub dictatorship from the early 1960s onwards. The relation was further deteriorated when the quota system, revived and expanded by the 1962 constitution, increased the number of seats in professional colleges for students from backward areas which was anathema to the middle-class literate Muhajirs.

The percentage of Muhajirs in the civil service declined while the percentage of others increased. In the presidential election of 1965, the Muslim League split into two factions: the Muslim League (Fatima Jinnah) supported Fatima Jinnah, the younger sister of Muhammad Ali Jinnah, while the Convention Muslim League supported General Ayub Khan. The Muhajirs at this time supported the Muslim League of Fatima Jinnah against Ayub Khan. The rivalry reached a peak after the electoral fraud of the 1965 presidential election and a post-election triumphal march by Gohar Ayub Khan, the son of General Ayub Khan, set off ethnic clashes between Pashtuns and Muhajirs in Karachi on 4 January 1965.

Four years later, on 24 March 1969, President Ayub Khan directed a letter to General Yahya Khan, inviting him to deal with the tense political situation in Pakistan. On 26 March 1969, General Yahya appeared on national television and proclaimed martial law over the country. Yahya subsequently abrogated the 1962 Constitution, dissolved parliament, and dismissed President Ayub's civilian officials.

=== 1970–1977 ===
The 1970 Pakistani general election on 7 December 1970, saw the Awami League winning the elections. The Muhajirs had voted for the Jamaat-e-Islami Pakistan and Jamiat Ulema-e-Pakistan, this popular support for these parties resulted in ethnic muhajirs winning all six NA seats and 18 PA seats in Karachi and Hyderabad. Muhajirs had decisively lost their place in the ruling elite, but they were still an economic force to be reckoned with (especially in urban Sindh). When Zulfikar Ali Bhutto became the country's head of state in December 1971, the Muhajirs feared that they would be further sidelined, this time by the economic and political resurgence of Sindhis under Bhutto. From the 1970s and onwards, Bhutto implemented a series of policies in Sindh that the Urdu-speaking population viewed as an assault on their political and economic rights as well as cultural identity.

The Pakistan People's Party government nationalized the financial industry, educational institutions, and industry. The nationalization of Pakistan's educational institutions, financial institutions, and industry in 1972 by Prime Minister Zulfikar Ali Bhutto of Pakistan People's Party impacted the Muhajirs hardest as their educational institutions, commerce, and industries were nationalized without any compensation. Subsequently, the quota system introduced by Liaquat Ali Khan which allowed Muhajirs to take government jobs was reversed by Zulfiqar Ali Bhutto preventing them from taking government jobs and other government institutions, by introducing urban rural quota divide in government job slots. These policies also included the forceful retirement, dismissal or demotion of over 1,000 Urdu-speaking officers.

In 1972, language riots broke out between Sindhis and Muhajirs after the passage of the "Teaching, Promotion, and use of Sindhi Language" bill in July 1972 by the Sindh Assembly; which declared Sindhi as the only official language of Sindh. Due to the clashes, Prime Minister Bhutto compromised and announced that Urdu and Sindhi would both be official languages in Sindh. The move had frustrated the Muhajirs as they did not speak the Sindhi language.

=== 1977–1988 ===
In the 1977 Pakistani general election, Jamaat-e-Islami Pakistan and Jamiat Ulema-e-Pakistan joined in a coalition named the Pakistan National Alliance. Since the Muhajirs voted mostly for the Pakistan National Alliance, they enthusiastically participated in the 1977 right-wing movement against the Bhutto regime which was caused by the alleged electoral fraud by Pakistan People's Party. The movement was particularly strong among Karachi's middle and lower-middle-classes who clashed with state forces and political opponents in deadly gun battles and destroyed state-owned plants. On 5 July 1977, Chief of Army Staff General Muhammad Zia-ul-Haq led a coup d'état against Bhutto and imposed martial law, due to the rising unrest in the country. A year after Zia's coup, Jamaat e Islami started losing support to the newly founded APMSO, which believed that Jamat Islami and Jamiat Ulema Pakistan were "playing the muhajirs false". APMSO created several militant cells, such as Black Tigers and Nadeem Commandos, to counter the heavily armed Thunder squad of Islami Jamiat-e-Talaba. On 18 March 1984, the senior members of APMSO launched the Mohajir Qaumi Movement (MQM) – an ethnic Muhajir party that was to serve as the senior partner of the APMSO. On 8 August 1986, a day still celebrated by the party as the moment the MQM came to the fore as a political force, Altaf Hussain drew thousands of Muhajirs to a rally in Nishtar Park where he declared Muhajirs a fifth sub-nationality within Pakistan. A year after the rally in Nishtar Park, MQM swept the local bodies' election in Karachi and Hyderabad.

=== 1988–2016 ===
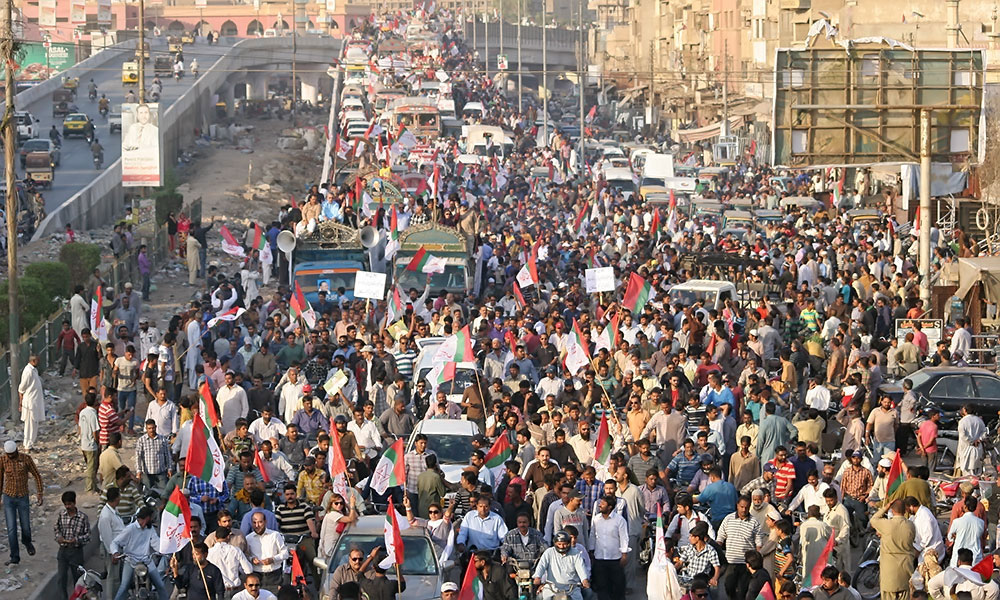
Mass protest of Muhajirs in favour of MQM

After the 1988 General Elections, MQM, the largest Muhajir nationalist party to exist at the time (with more than 100,000 party workers), emerged as the third-largest political party of Pakistan, in alliance with PPP. Differences developed between the PPP and MQM after dozens were killed at an MQM congregation by Sindhi nationalists, and the alliance fell apart in the wake of ensuing violence. The MQM lent its support to Nawaz Sharif's Islami Jamhoori Ittehad instead. In June 1992, a massive 'Operation Cleanup' was launched to rid the city of terrorism but MQM was selectively targeted. The Party's political offices were shut down as scores of its workers were killed in extra judicial murders and shootouts, forcing to move its offices to London. After the operation ended, MQM staged a comeback and a second crackdown against MQM was carried out during the tenure of Prime Minister Benazir Bhutto, in which many associated with the party were killed. After the military takeover in 1999 by Pervez Musharraf, the MQM backed Pervez Musharraf strongly till his resignation in 2008. Even after Musharraf's fall from power, MQM continued to dominate Muhajir politics until 2016 when it broke up into four factions and collapsed.

=== 2016–present ===
Amid a fractured MQM, the populist leader Imran Khan's PTI started to dominate Karachi's politics with a multiethnic support base from all walks of life, including the Muhajirs mainly from upper-middle and middle class, while lower-middle class Muhajirs turned to Tehreek-e-Labbaik Pakistan. Despite tough opposition from PPP and TLP, PTI managed to bag the popular vote en masses during the 2018 Pakistani general elections, though with a lower voter turnout. But in 2023, after the merger of the MQM factions, MQM staged a comeback into Muhajir politics. In 2023 Karachi local government elections MQM-P's boycott resulted in very low voter turnouts.

== Society ==
=== National integration ===
A 2009 Pew Research Center report found that 92% of Muhajirs identified primarily as Pakistani when choosing between national and ethnic identities, the second highest proportion among all surveyed groups after Punjabis (96%), and at an equal level with Pashtuns.

=== Economic status ===
A 2023 research project conducted by Karachi University found that 9% of Muhajirs were upper-class, while 17% were upper-middle class, 52% middle class, 13% lower middle and 9% lower class. A 2019 study by Jinnah Postgraduate Medical Center found that Muhajir women have the highest employment rate and monthly income among all major ethnic groups of Pakistan. And according to the 1951 census of Pakistan, less than 15 per cent of Muhajirs were unskilled labourers, with almost 61 per cent classified as skilled workers and more than 5 per cent belonging to professional and managerial backgrounds. By settlements, 68.4% Muhajirs lived in planned areas and 88.9% have access to basic utilities. They have been very successful in finance institutions, and have founded most of Pakistan's banking institutions including State Bank of Pakistan, Habib Bank Limited, United Bank Limited, and Bank AL Habib.

=== Sports ===
Until the 1970s, Karachi had been a historical centre for producing cricketers and hockey players for the Pakistan national cricket team and hockey team. Some of the notable cricketers of a Muhajir background during the era include Javed Miandad among many others.

=== Health and genetics ===
In the ethnic groups of Pakistan, the lowest prevalence of metabolic syndrome was seen in Muhajirs (32.5%). Muhajirs have a gene diversity of 0.6081, which is 0.001 less than the Pakistani average of 0.6091. The overall prevalence of proteinuria in Muhajir children 3.6%.

== Culture ==
Muhajir culture is the culture that migrated mainly from North India after the independence of Pakistan in 1947 generally to Karachi. The Muhajir culture refers to the Pakistani variation of Indo-Islamic culture and part of the Culture of Karachi city in Pakistan.

=== Cuisine ===
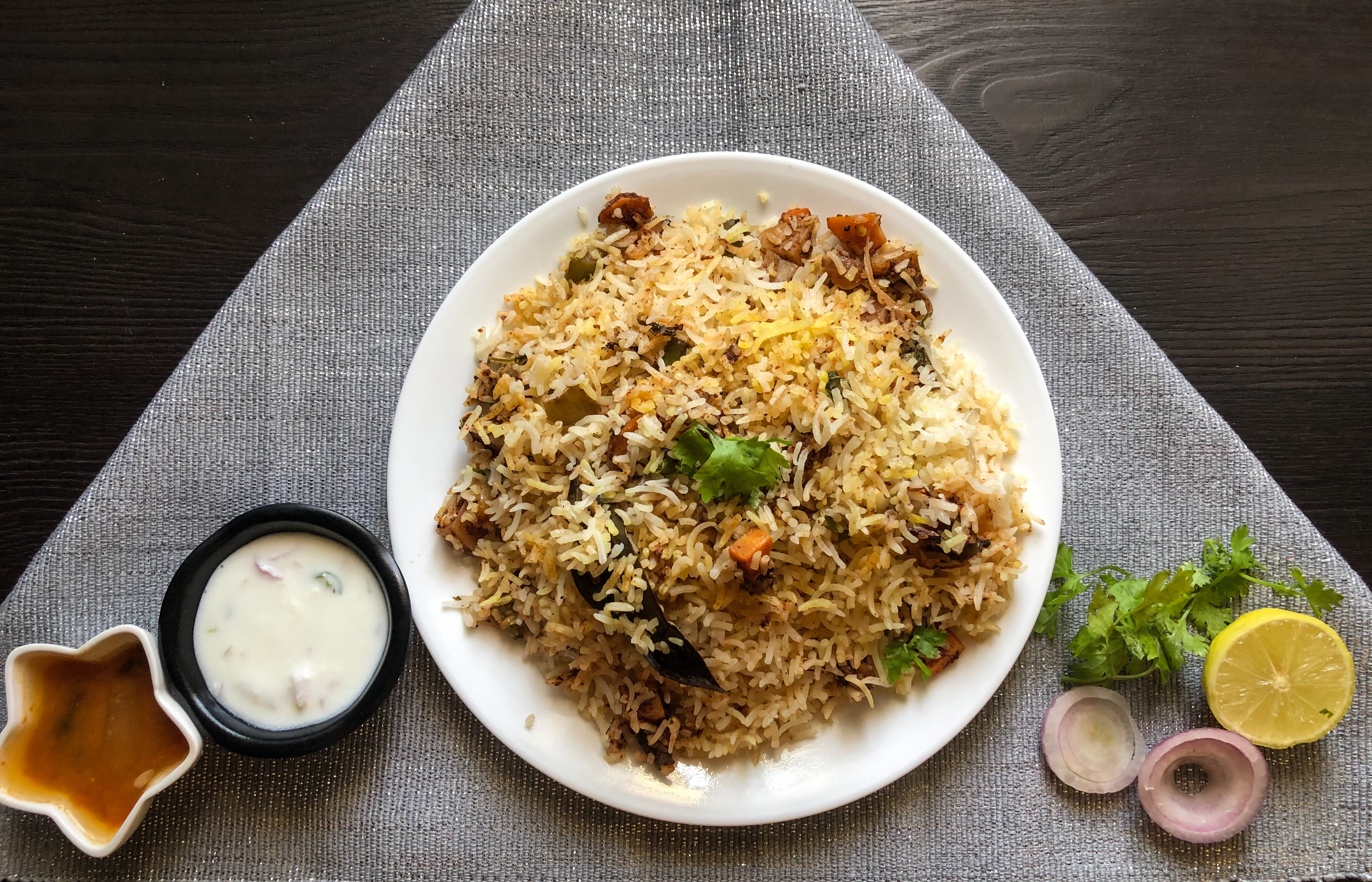
Hyderabadi biryani

Muhajir cuisine refers to the cuisine of Muhajirs, and is covered under both Indian and Pakistani cuisines, and is mostly found in the Pakistani city of Karachi. Special dishes include biryani, qorma, kofta, seekh kabab, nihari, haleem, Nargisi koftay, roghani naan, naan, sheer-khurma (dessert), and chai (sweet, milky tea) are associated with Muhajir cuisine.

=== Traditional dress ===
The traditional clothing of Muhajirs is the traditional clothing worn by Muslims in North India, and it has both Muslim and South Asian influences. Both Muslim men and women wear the shalwar kameez. Men also wear the sherwani, and it is believed to have been introduced to Pakistan by Muhajirs. Muhajir women (mainly from Northern India) wear sari, which is an un-stitched stretch of woven fabric arranged over the body like a robe. The Gharara was also worn by Muhajir women, which originated from the Nawabs' attempt to imitate the British evening gown.

=== Festivals ===
Muhajirs celebrate many festivals which include religious, political, ethnic, and national festivals. Islamic festivals which are celebrated by Muhajirs include Eid-al-Fitr, Eid-al-Adha, and Ashoura. Political celebrations include MQM Founding Day, Death anniversary of Azeem Ahmad Tariq, and APMSO Founding Day. Muhajirs celebrate Muhajir Cultural Day as an ethnic and cultural festival.

== See also ==
- Stranded Muhajirs in Bangladesh
- List of people from Karachi
- List of Muhajir people

== Sources ==
- Batliwala, Usman Umar (1995), احمد داؤد – ایک پیکرِ اوصاف (Aik Paiker-e-Ausaaf) (in Urdu) (1 ed.), Karachi: Faran Publications
- Jaffrelot, Christophe (16 June 2016). The Pakistan Paradox: Instability And Resilience. Random House Publishers India Pvt. Limited. pp. 100–. ISBN 978-81-8400-707-7.
- Lieven, Anatol (2011). Pakistan : a hard country (1st ed.). New York: PublicAffairs. ISBN 978-1-61039-021-7. OCLC 710995260.
- Wolpert, Stanley (1984). Jinnah of Pakistan. New York: Oxford University Press. ISBN 978-0-19-503412-7.
