= Syed Ali Abbas Jalalpuri =

- سید علی عباس جلال پوری
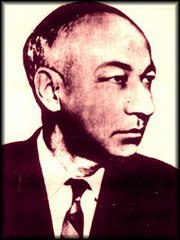
- Syed Ali Abbas Jalalpuri
- Born: 19 October 1914; Jalalpur Sharif, Jhelum, British India
- Died: 6 December 1998 (aged 84); Jalalpur Sharif, PinddadanKhan, Jhelum
- Resting place: Jalalpur Sharif, Pinddadan Khan, Jhelum
- Citizenship: Pakistani
- Education: M. A. Urdu, M. A. Persian (Gold Medalist), M. A. Philosophy (Gold Medalist)
- Occupations: Professor, Writer
- Spouse: Shahzadi Begum
- Writing career
- Language: Urdu, Punjabi, Persian

Syed Ali Abbas Jalalpuri (Urdu: سید علی عباس جلالپوری) was a professor of philosophy in Government College Lahore. He is regarded by the intellectuals of Pakistan as the Will Durant of Pakistan. He had master's degrees in Philosophy, Persian and Urdu. He wrote at least fourteen books on philosophy, history, and religion in Urdu language. He was known as a first-rate scholar, and his books seemed to herald an age of reason in Pakistan.

His opinions on the subjects of history, civilization, religion, philosophy, metaphysics, and folklore are held in great esteem. In his greatest work, Riwayat-e-Falsafa (Story of Philosophy), he tried to educate the common Urdu reader on the subject of Philosophy. This book served its purpose in popularizing the subject it discussed like Will Durant's The Story of Philosophy.

Like the Dictionnaire Historique et Critique of Pierre Bayle and the Philosophical Dictionary of Voltaire, he wrote a philosophical dictionary, 'Khird Nama Jalalpuri' to explain the subject's terminologies in Urdu. He also wrote "Jinsiyati Mutaley" (A Study of Sex), which presented a great research work on the subject in Urdu language.

== His works ==
- Riwayat-e-Falsafa (Story of Philosophy)
- Wahdatul Wujud tey Punjabi Sha'eri (Pantheism and Punjabi Poetry)
- Iqbal Ka Ilm-e-Kalam (The Theology of Allama Muhammad Iqbal
- Maqamat-e-Waris Shah (Places of Waris) Shah)
- Ruh-e-Asar ( Zeit Geist or The Spirit of the Age)
- Aam Fikri Mughaltay (Common Intellectual Errors)
- Tareekh Ka Naya Mor (The New Turn of History)
- Rasoom Aqwam (The Cultures of Nations)
- Jinsiyati Mutaley (Studies in Sex)
- Kianat aur Insan (Universe and Man)
- Riwayat-e-Tamadan Qadeem (Story of Ancient Civilizations)
- Khird Nama Jalalpuri ( Jalalpuri Dictionary)
- Maqalat Jallapuri (Essays by Jalalpuri)
- Sibd Gulchainh (A collection of poetry)

== Tributes ==
"Ali Abbas Jalalpuri was a very rigorous historian of Philosophy and Epistemology. As the dominant mode of Philosophy in Indian Subcontinent has been “Analytical” I include him in the first trend as well. He is amongst first of the Modern Pakistani academics who took interest in the “Question of Civilization”, “History of Ideas” and “Academic Clarity”, “Relationship of Metaphysics, Language and Folklore”, the questions which would eventually become most important issues for European Philosopher especially after “Structuralist” revolution in Paris. Jalalpuri was aware of the inconsistencies and contradictions in explaining Iqbal when subjected to traditional Analytical Model of Philosophy. Where to place Iqbal in the Web of Modern Philosophical Ideas?” was the question he faced and he thought he had theperfect solution. Instead of trying to put Iqbal in the Project of Modernity and face the problem of Contradiction, Jalalpuri placed Iqbal among the traditional Islamic Philosophers or the “Kalamist”. So the “Paradox” is “Avoided”, Instead of Philosopher, Iqbal is a “Schoolmen” trying to complete “Islamic Scholasticism” after Ghezali. Jalalpuri is rigorous in his work. due to non existent academy, the trend ended with him. “Completing Islamic Scholasticism” is certainly a part of Iqbal's work, but it's a Part, not the whole."

"In 1971, Ali Abbas Jalalpuri wrote a very comprehensive critique of Iqbāl's theology of modernity. He faults Iqbāl for selective and arbitrary interpretation of the Qur’ānic verses. To him, ambivalence towards pantheism and Ibn Arabi (d. 1240) at some places, his devotion to the pantheist Rumi, and his idea of Absolute Ego make it clear that Iqbāl's theology has deep roots in pantheism."

== See also ==
- Will Durant
- Government College Lahore.
- A History of Western Philosophy
- Muhammad Iqbal
- Pakistan
- Punjabi language
- The Story of Philosophy
- Urdu
