= All Pakistan Muttahidda Students Organization =

Pakistani student organization

All Pakistan Muttahida Students Organization آل پاکستان متحدہ اسٹوڈنٹس آرگنائزیشن
- Abbreviation: APMSO
- Leaders: Altaf Hussain (founder); Khalid Maqbool Siddiqui
- Founders: Altaf Hussain; Azeem Ahmed Tariq
- Founded: June 11, 1978; 48 years ago
- Headquarters: Nine Zero, Karachi (former); Bahadurabad, Karachi
- Slogan: Ilm Sab Ke Liye (Education for everyone) REALISM & PRACTICALISM BY MR ALTAF HUSSAIN (FOUNDER)

Party flag

Website
- Official website of P faction Official website of L faction
- Politics of Pakistan; Political parties; Elections; After the split within of MQM into MQM-L and MQM-P, APMSO also hits factionalism. Although, two main factions were headed by MQM founder Altaf Hussain and Khalid Maqbool Siddiqui namely APMSO-Pakistan and APMSO-London respectively. Howerer, Altaf Hussain dissolved MQM-L in 2016

The All Pakistan Muttahida Students Organization (APMSO; Urdu: (آل پاکستان متحدہ اسٹوڈنٹس آرگنائزیشن)) is a Pakistani student organization notable for creating a political party: the Muhajir Quami Movement, now called the Muttahida Qaumi Movement (MQM).

APMSO was founded by Altaf Hussain along with other students including Azeem Ahmed Tariq, Dr. Imran Farooq on Sunday, 11 June 1978 at Karachi University. It was one of the founding members of the United Student Movement. Hussain also served as a 1st Chairman of organization while Azeem Ahmed Tariq served as 1st General Secretary of the organization.

== Creation and philosophy ==
On 11 June 1978, Altaf Hussain and others created the All Pakistan Mohajir Students Organization (APMSO) to provide the university students a way to fight injustice. It became popular among students of Karachi University. APMSO won student union election in the 1980s.

Many leaders rose from APMSO Azeem Ahmed Tariq, Imran Farooq, Farooq Sattar, Ishrat ul Ebad, Haider Abbas Rizvi and many others.

According to APMSO's website, the philosophy of the APMSO and the Muttahida Qaumi Movement is Realism and Practicalism.

== Mohajir identity ==
Mohajirs identity was made as a coined term for all the refugees who migrated to Sindh during partition marking them as a distinct ethnicity during the partition". But ethno-nationalist politicians convinced them that circumstances needed them to seek their identity on ethnic lines. The Muhajir sense of isolation came into being through a series of events. The three most important being the 1964 presidential elections, the 1972 language riots, and the post-1985 ethnic clashes between Muhajirs and non-Muhajirs in Karachi. "During the December 1964 presidential elections, the Muhajir population of Karachi experienced a wrath of a Pathan backlash when Gohar Ayub Khan, son of President Ayub Khan, launched a series of attacks on Muhajir communities because of their support for Fatimah Jinnah, the sister of Mohammad Ali Jinnah, against Ayub Khan." Though Gohar Ayub's intentions were to target those who opposed his father, ethno-nationalists portrayed the move as specifically targeting Muhajirs At this time Ayub Khan moved the federal capital from Karachi to Islamabad, causing further anger amongst the elite of the Muhajir community, especially the bureaucracy.

The 1972 language riots were caused by the passage of a language bill by the Sindhi Assembly declaring Sindhi to be the provincial language along with Urdu. The making of Sindhi as an equal language to Urdu for official purposes frustrated the elite of the Muhajir community as it disfavored their hegemony over the region.

In June 1978 the All Pakistan Muhajir Student Organization was formed and it took on the task of creating a sense of distinction amongst Muhajir youth, on linguistic line, from the rest of Pakistanis. From the APMSO, in March 1984, was created the Muhajir Qaumi Movement. Now called the Muttahida Qaumi Movement (MQM), its leader declares its ideology to be based on Realism and Practicalism. The official MQM website states that "Acceptance of reality with an open heart is Realism, a concept based upon the philosophy of its Founder and Leader Mr. Altaf Hussain. Based on Realism positive achievement made through ideologically supported pragmatic programs is called Practicalism."

== Transition to MQM ==
From the early days APMSO faced many attacks by the Thunder Squad of Islami Jamiat Talaba (IJT). Jamiat feared losing its stronghold in the university to APMSO. Therefore, the Leadership of Islami Jamiat Talaba instructed its "Thunder Squad", led by Munawar Hasan, to remove APMSO and its leadership from university.

In 1981 the Thunder Squad attacked stalls of APMSO at university gates with knives and revolver and badly wounded 16 members of APMSO, including founder of APMSO Altaf Hussain and then the squad entry of APMSO in university.

Subsequently, Hussain decided to establish a National Political Party for Mohajir and then he found Mohajir Qaumi Movement (MQM) on 18 March 1984. MQM also achieved success as APMSO and the philosophy of Altaf Hussain and MQM spread all over Sindh, especially in Karachi, Hyderabad, Mirpurkhas, Nawabshah and Sukker.

== Re-Engineering Pakistan Exhibition 2011 ==
=== Announcement in a press conference ===
On 6 June 2011, the Chairman of All Pakistan Muttahida Students Organization Engr. Farhan Shams announced "Re-engineering Pakistan", a three-day science exhibition by the Academic and Social Circle with the collaboration of APMSO at a press conference at the Karachi Press Club. This conference was organized with the aim of bringing out the talents of Pakistani students and to give them an environment conducive for a better future. Shams further stated that APMSO organized this exhibition in keeping with its past traditions and it would continue to hold such constructive programs for the betterment of the student community. He was accompanied by vice chairman Abdul Wahab, Secretary General Shabbir Babar Ali, Ahsan Ghouri and Isra Tufail.

Shams stated that it was because in the light of the guidelines given by Altaf Hussain that the APMSO was organizing "Re-engineering Pakistan" exhibition at Karachi Expo Centre from 7 June to 9 June. More than 500 institutions of higher education and learning were taking part in this exhibition and more than 300 projects would be displayed. Projects made by students and professionals regarding social sciences, engineering and medical sciences, as well as solar energy drone and submarine technology, would be displayed in the exhibition.

=== 1st day of exhibition and opening ceremony ===
On 7 June 2011, the "Re-engineering Pakistan" exhibition started in Karachi Expo Centre under Academic and Social Circle, a subsidiary social wing of All Pakistan Muttahida Students Organization. The exhibition was opened by member of the Co-ordination Committee Nasrin Jalil and Provincial Minister for Industries Rauf Siddiqui. Member Co-ordination Committee Wasay Jalil, Kunwar Khalid Yunus, Qasim Ali Raza, Salim Tajik, Sagheer Ahmed, vice-chancellor Karachi University Pirzada Qasim, Siddiqui office-bearers of AMPSO and a large number of other dignitaries from industry were also present on the occasion.

More than 250 stalls from various educational institutions including NED University, Karachi University, Federal Urdu University, Hamdard University, Sindh Medical College, Karachi Medical and Dental College, Sir Syed University, Jinnah University for Women, Muhammad Ali Jinnah University and S M Law College were put up in the exhibition.

Visitors exhibited keen interest in projects relating to solar energy, electric-powered card, primitive form of drone, aero-plane, robots, traffic signals and other interesting projects made by the students of various universities.

=== 2nd day of exhibition ===
On 8 June 2011, the Founder and Leader of Muttahida Quami Movement (MQM) Altaf Hussain appreciated the efforts of the central committee of All Pakistan Muttahida Students Organization (APMSO) and Academic and Social Circle for successfully holding the "Re-engineering Pakistan" exhibition at the Karachi Expo Centre. He also commended the students who took active part in the exhibition.

Hussain appealed to the teaching community and the scientists to visit the exhibition guide the students in making their work fruitful for the country. He announced three cash prizes of one lack, fifty thousand and twenty five thousand for the students that would be judged first, second and third respectively. The prizes will be given on the last day of the exhibition.

Meanwhile, Deputy Convener of Co-ordination Committee and Federal Minister for Overseas Pakistanis Farooq Sattar visited the expo centre and gave a press briefing about the exhibition. Sattar said that Pakistani youths had the ability to take the country ahead in the 21st century. Altaf Hussain, the APMSO and the Academic and Social Circle had proved that nothing was impossible if the intentions were pure.

=== 3rd day of exhibition ===
On 9 June 2011, the Founder and Leader of Muttahida Quami Movement (MQM) Altaf Hussain addressed a large gathering of students, young professionals, educationists, scientists, economists, representatives of corporate sector and others belonging to different walks of life at the closing ceremony of the "Re-engineering Pakistan" exhibition held by Academic and Social Circle, a social wing of All Pakistan Muttahida Students Organizations. Members of the Co-ordination Committee of the MQM were also present on the occasion.

Hussain praised the central committee of the APMSO on organizing the "Re-engineering Pakistan" exhibition and said that if the students were supported by the government Pakistan would not need to ask the US for the drone technology.

== Karachi University and youth politics ==
Karachi University has been the hub of student political activity for many decades. According to The News International, "Student politics were born with the formation of Islami Jamiat Talba (IJT) and the Democratic Students' Federation (DSF) in 1948." Since then, numerous student political groups have emerged throughout the country representing different races, ethnicities, cultures, and ideologies.

"In the first few decades of Pakistan's existence, student politics was a symbol of the students' socio-political awareness"; however, change was quick and drastic, especially in the 1980s and 1990s. "Karachi University, like its host city, has always been a melting pot for students from all over the country. Its grounds have seen the spirited expression of various socio-political schools of thought, the gradual desensitisation of students after the military takeover of 1979 as well as the violent military crackdown on the APMSO-PSF conflict in 1993 that was followed by the indefinite deployment of Rangers on campus." In April 1984 General Zia Ul-Haq imposed a ban on all student organizations throughout the country, which prohibited the "formation and continuance" of student unions and stipulated a punishment of violators of the regulation by rigorous imprisonment up to five years, by a fine, or by both.

Although political parties still exist on campus, authorities deny their presence. Because of the constant rise in violence, the number of student political activists has dropped tremendously. Today parents "fearfully raise their children to mind their own business, study to build careers, not ideologies and lead safe, peaceful lives in sheltered cocoons. While student attendance may be full at academic, entertainment, or sports events organized by these parties, for any other events, students hesitate."

Despite constant condemnation by university administration, media and even the general student body, these parties maintain that they still have a role to play in society. Some students attribute this intolerance to the intolerance of university authorities for students' expressions against injustice. In charge of APMSO's KU wing, adds to the case for political restoration of students, "We propose the restoration of a student union that has equal participation from all students. What we want is a students' parliament accommodating all the students in a peaceful, free environment."

According to the APMSO's KU Organizer, the alleged party workers had in fact nothing to do with APMSO, and that there have been numerous cases of students belonging to certain ethnic groups using the APMSO name to get out of attending classes. He insisted that his party strongly condemns students' missing classes for any reason. However, he does agree that security threats are indeed an issue and that the party has in the past requested the administration to provide security to some workers threatened by rival parties persisting to destroy the peace of the university.

== NAQEEB ==
NAQEEB is a quarterly Urdu magazine featuring articles, reports, poetry and other materials of interest to students. NAQEEB is published by Gehwara-e-Adab with the collaboration of APMSO from the head-office of Gehwara-e-Adab. NAQEEB is quite popular among students. The meaning of NAQEEB is "Harbinger".
