= Hanif Mohammad =

Pakistani cricketer

PP Hanif Mohammad

Personal information
- Born: 21 December 1934; Junagadh, Junagadh State, British India
- Died: 11 August 2016 (aged 81); Karachi, Sindh, Pakistan
- Nickname: Little Master
- Height: 5 ft 7 in (1.70 m)
- Batting: Right-handed
- Bowling: Right-arm off break
- Role: Batsman
- Relatives: Wazir Mohammad (brother); Raees Mohammad (brother); Mushtaq Mohammad (brother); Sadiq Mohammad (brother); Shoaib Mohammad (son); Mohammad Wasim Jr. (grandson)

International information
- National side: Pakistan (1952–1969)
- Test debut (cap 4): 16 October 1952 v India
- Last Test: 24 October 1969 v New Zealand

Career statistics
Competition	Test	First-class
Matches	55	238
Runs scored	3,915	17,059
Batting average	43.98	52.32
100s/50s	12/15	55/66
Top score	337	499
Balls bowled	206	2,766
Wickets	1	53
Bowling average	95.00	28.49
5 wickets in innings	0	0
10 wickets in match	0	0
Best bowling	1/1	3/4
Catches/stumpings	40/–	178/12
- Source: Cricinfo, 3 August 2008

Pride of Performance Award Recipient
- Date: 1959
- Country: Islamic Republic of Pakistan
- Presented by: Islamic Republic of Pakistan

Hanif Mohammad PP (21 December 1934 – 11 August 2016) was a Pakistani cricketer. He played for the Pakistani cricket team in 55 Test matches between the 1952–53 season and the 1969–70 season. He averaged 43.98, scoring twelve centuries. At his peak, he was considered one of the best batsmen in the world despite playing at a time when Pakistan played very little Test cricket; Hanif played just 55 Test matches in a career spanning 17 years. In his obituary by Cricinfo, he was honoured as the original Little Master, a title later assumed by Sunil Gavaskar and Sachin Tendulkar. He was the first Pakistani to score a triple hundred in a Test match.

== Life and career ==
Hanif was born to a Memon family that had settled in Junagadh state. He was trained by Abdul Aziz, an Afghan cricket player, who had earlier played in Ranji Trophy for Jamnagar and father of Indian cricketer, Salim Durani. He made his first-class debut playing for Pakistan against the MCC in November 1951. He made 26 in 165 minutes. His Test debut was in Pakistan's first ever Test match against India in October 1952, where he was the top scorer of Pakistan's first innings.

The highest of Hanif's Test centuries was a famous 337 made against the West Indies in a six-day test at Bridgetown in 1957/58. It is still the highest score by a player in away Tests. After Pakistan found itself following on from a first-innings deficit of 473 runs on the afternoon of the third day, Hanif spent more than sixteen hours at the crease compiling his runs, helping Pakistan to draw the game. It remains the longest innings in Test history (and stood as the longest in all first-class cricket for over 40 years). It was the only Test match instance of a triple century in a team's second innings until it was equaled by New Zealand cricketer Brendon McCullum against India in 2014. Displays such as this earned him the nickname "Little Master". Hanif Mohammad also has the world record for scoring the slowest test triple century in terms of minutes (858) and the only player in test history to have spent over 970 minutes to score a test triple ton. He also captained Pakistan in 11 Tests from 1964 to 1967 before retiring in 1969.

In 1958–59, he surpassed Don Bradman's record for the highest individual first-class innings. Hanif made 499 for Karachi in a match against Bahawalpur before being run out attempting his five hundredth run; this stood for more than 35 years before being passed by Brian Lara in 1994. It was the first instance of a triple and quadruple century being scored in the Quaid-e-Azam Trophy. In all he made 55 first-class centuries and finished with a strong first-class career average of 52.32. He could bowl with either arm, and kept wicket on a number of occasions. He is known to have played the slowest test innings when he scored 20 off 223 balls at a strike rate of 8.97.

Hanif's career lasted until 1975–76, but he never played in the English County Championship, although he did have an outing for the Northamptonshire Second XI in August 1965 whilst preparing for his appearance for a Rest of the World XI against England at the Scarborough Festival a few days later. Hanif was named as a Wisden Cricketer of the Year in 1968 and in January 2009 he was named along with two other Pakistani players, Imran Khan and Javed Miandad, among the inaugural batch of 55 inductees into the ICC's Hall of Fame.

In one Test match against Australia, Hanif scored a century in the first innings. In the second, he was given out stumped by Barry Jarman off the bowling of Tom Veivers for 93. Hanif respected the umpire's decision. Later in a press conference Jarman admitted that Hanif was not out.

In 1972, after retiring from international cricket, Hanif co-founded the magazine The Cricketer Pakistan. He edited this magazine for two decades. He also served as the team manager for Pakistan International Airlines (PIA).

=== Batting performance ===
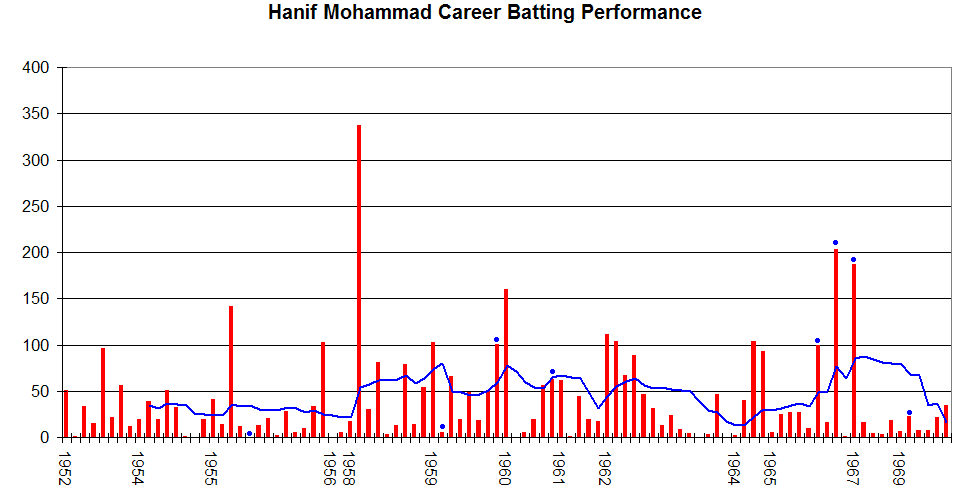
Hanif Mohammad's career performance graph.

== Family members ==
Hanif was one of the five Mohammad brothers, four of whom (Wazir, Mushtaq, Sadiq and Hanif himself) played Test cricket for Pakistan, as did his son Shoaib. Another brother Raees was once twelfth man for Pakistan, and four nephews had first-class careers. Hanif's grandson, Shehzar Mohammad, is also a Pakistani first-class cricketer. Hanif's mother Ameer Bee was a national badminton champion in pre-independence British India.

== Death ==
Hanif Mohammad was diagnosed with lung cancer in 2013. He had been undergoing treatment for lung cancer at Karachi's Aga Khan Hospital. He died on 11 August 2016 at age 81.

== Tribute, awards and recognition ==
In 2018, a Google Doodle was created to celebrate his 84th birthday. Hanif's triple-century against the West Indies team in 1957/58 made him a legend in the cricketing world. He was one of the original inductees into the ICC Cricket Hall of Fame.

The grade-II four-day competition has been renamed the Hanif Mohammad Trophy by the Pakistan Cricket Board (PCB), in honor of one of the forefathers of Pakistan cricket's early years.

Hanif received the Pride of Performance Award in 1959 by the Government of Pakistan

The Memon community of Karachi has built a park in his honor for representing the community called "Cutchi Memon Family Park and Little Master Hanif Mohammad Cricket Ground."

In December 2016 the Pakistan Cricket Board opened the Hanif Mohammad High Performance Sports Centre in Karachi, next to the National Stadium.

Sporting positions
Preceded by Javed Burki	Pakistan Cricket Captain; 1964–1967	Succeeded by Saeed Ahmed
Records
Preceded by Don Bradman	Highest individual score in first-class cricket 499 Karachi v Bahawalpur at Karachi 1958–59	Succeeded by Brian Lara
