= Wazir Mohammad =

Pakistani cricketer and banker (1929–2025)

Personal information
- Born: 22 December 1929; Junagadh, Junagadh State, British Raj
- Died: 13 October 2025 (aged 95); Birmingham, England
- Batting: Right-handed
- Bowling: Right-arm
- Relatives: Hanif Mohammad (brother); Raees Mohammad (brother); Mushtaq Mohammad (brother); Sadiq Mohammad (brother)

International information
- National side: Pakistan (1952–1959)
- Test debut (cap 14): 13 November 1952 v India
- Last Test: 13 November 1959 v Australia

Career statistics
Competition	Test	First-class
Matches	20	105
Runs scored	801	4,930
Batting average	27.62	40.40
100s/50s	2/3	11/26
Top score	189	189
Balls bowled	24	102
Wickets	0	0
Bowling average	–	–
5 wickets in innings	–	–
10 wickets in match	–	–
Best bowling	–	–
Catches/stumpings	5/–	35/–
- Source: CricInfo, 16 October 2025

Wazir Mohammad (Urdu: وزیر محمد; 22 December 1929 – 13 October 2025) was a Pakistani cricketer and banker who played in 20 Test matches for the Pakistan national cricket team between 1952 and 1959.

== Biography ==
Wazir was born in Junagadh. His family moved to Karachi after the formation of Pakistan in 1947.

He was a determined middle-order batsman with a strong defence. His highest Test score was 189, in the fifth Test against the West Indies at Queen's Park Oval in Port of Spain in 1957–58, when he batted for six and three-quarter hours and laid the foundation for Pakistan's innings victory. He was Pakistan's top-scorer with 42 not out when they won by 24 runs against England at The Oval in 1954.

Wazir's first-class career extended from 1950 to 1964, when he captained Karachi Whites to a narrow defeat in the final of the 1963–64 Quaid-e-Azam Trophy. He captained the Pakistan Eaglets team of young players on their tour of England in 1963; 14 of the 18 players on the tour became Test cricketers, and four became Test captains. Wazir was affectionately known as 'Wisden' for his encyclopaedic knowledge of cricket stats and trivia.

Wazir worked as a banker, mostly with the National Bank of Pakistan. He was one of the five Mohammad brothers, four of whom (Hanif, Mushtaq, Sadiq and Wazir himself) played Test cricket for Pakistan. Wazir lived in Solihull, England. After the death of Israr Ali on 1 February 2016, he was Pakistan's oldest living Test cricketer. He died in Birmingham on 13 October 2025, at the age of 95.
