= Mushtaq Mohammad =

Pakistani cricketer

Mushtaq Mohammad PP
Personal information
- Born: 22 November 1943 (age 82); Junagadh, Junagadh State, British India
- Batting: Right-handed
- Bowling: Right-arm legbreak googly
- Role: All-rounder
- Relatives: Wazir Mohammad (brother); Raees Mohammad (brother); Hanif Mohammad (brother); Sadiq Mohammad (brother); Shoaib Mohammad (nephew)

International information
- National side: Pakistan (1959-1979)
- Test debut (cap 31): 26 March 1959 v West Indies
- Last Test: 24 March 1979 v Australia
- ODI debut (cap 5): 11 February 1973 v New Zealand
- Last ODI: 3 November 1978 v India

Career statistics
Competition	Test	ODIs	FC	LA
Matches	57	10	502	180
Runs scored	3,643	209	31,091	4,471
Batting average	39.17	34.83	42.07	29.22
100s/50s	10/19	0/1	72/159	1/24
Top score	201	55	303*	131
Balls bowled	5,260	42	47,226	2,090
Wickets	79	0	936	49
Bowling average	29.22	–	24.34	30.24
5 wickets in innings	3	–	39	0
10 wickets in match	0	–	2	0
Best bowling	5/28	–	7/18	4/30
Catches/stumpings	42/–	3/–	349/–	48/–
Medal record
Men's Cricket
Representing Pakistan as Coach
ICC Cricket World Cup
Runner-up	1999 England-Wales -Ireland-Scotland-Netherlands
- Source: ESPNcricinfo, 14 March 2013

Mushtaq Mohammad PP (Urdu: مشتاق محمد; born 22 November 1943) is a Pakistani cricket coach and former cricketer who played in 57 Tests and 10 ODIs from 1959 to 1979. A right-handed batsman and a leg-spinner, he is one of the most successful Pakistani all-rounders and went on to captain his country in nineteen Test matches. He was the first and to date only Pakistani to score a century and take five wickets in an innings in the same test match twice. He was the Coach of the squad which finished as runners-up at the 1999 Cricket World Cup.

Mushtaq was one of the five Mohammad brothers, four of whom (Wazir, Sadiq, Hanif and Mushtaq himself) played Test cricket for Pakistan, as did Hanif's son Shoaib. Another brother Raees was once twelfth man for Pakistan. Mushtaq's mother Ameer Bee was a national badminton champion in pre-independence British India.

Mushtaq coached the United States national cricket team. He also did cricket commentary for Pakistani television for many years.

== Early life ==
Born in Junagadh in what would become a border region of India with Pakistan, Mushtaq as a child attended the Church Mission High School in Karachi.

== First-class cricket ==
Mushtaq began his first class career at the age of 13 years and 41 days, scoring 87 and taking 5 for 28 on debut. He played for Karachi and Pakistan International Airlines at home and went on to represent Northamptonshire in county cricket from 1966 to 1977, scoring more than 1,000 runs in every season. In both 1967 and 1971 he stayed with the county during Pakistan tours of England, playing for the touring side only in Test matches and a few other fixtures.

Mushtaq captained Northamptonshire between 1975 and 1977, and in 1976 led the side to victory in the Gillette Cup, the county's first-ever trophy, and to second place in the County Championship, equalling its best-ever position. But his captaincy ended in some controversy. According to Wisden, Mushtaq resigned, claiming that his future had not been made clear and that there were rumours – which turned out to be true – that former captain Jim Watts was to be reappointed for 1978. Mushtaq had in any case signed for World Series Cricket in Australia, but there were harsh words from the county's chairman about dressing room politics and Mushtaq did not play for Northants again.

He scored 72 hundreds in a 502-game first-class career. Mushtaq was the first Pakistani to score 25,000 first-class runs, ending up with 31,091, more than half of them for Northamptonshire. His record included a highest score of 303 not out. As a wrist-spinner, he bowled the legbreak, googly and flipper.

== Test cricket ==
On 26 March 1959 against West Indies at Lahore, Mushtaq succeeded his elder brothers Wazir and Hanif into Test cricket. Based on his publicised date of birth of 22 November 1943, he was then 15 years and 124 days, the youngest person to play Test cricket at the time. He scored 18 runs in the match and Pakistan were defeated by an innings and 156 runs. The first of his ten Test hundreds would come in his 6th Test, 101 against India in Feroz Shah Kotla, when he was 17 years and 78 days old, which was the youngest age for a test centurion. The record stood for over 40 years until it was bettered by Mohammad Ashraful. His next century came against England in 1962 and he would have to wait another 9 years until his next century.

In 1970 he played for the Rest of the World against England in the series that was later stripped of its Test status. Early in 1973, he scored 121 against Australia at Sydney and 201 against New Zealand in his next match a month later. In the latter game, he became the only cricketer other than Denis Atkinson to score a double century and take five wickets in a Test match. He finished the year with 777 runs at the average of 86.33.

He captained Pakistan in 19 Test matches from 1976–77 to 1978–79. During this time, he scored 121 and 56 and took eight wickets against West Indies at Port of Spain in 1976–77 to inflict a rare home defeat on West Indies. Thereby Mushtaq also became only the second player after Garfield Sobers to score a century and take five wickets in an innings in a test match on more than one occasion. He led Pakistan to a 2–0 win over India when the two countries played their first series against each other in eighteen years in 1978–79.

Mushtaq is regarded as one of the first cricketers to use the reverse-sweep in the 1970s. Though his elder brother Hanif Mohammad is sometimes credited as the inventor. Cricket coach Bob Woolmer has been credited with popularising the stroke.

He joined Kerry Packer's World Series Cricket in the late seventies. He went on to become a coach of Pakistan Cricket Team and led the side which reached the final of the 1999 Cricket World Cup.

== Minor cricket ==
Mushtaq also appeared below first-class level in Minor Counties cricket for Shropshire in 1984-1985 (appearing for them in 15 matches and achieving an exact century in one match), as well as for Staffordshire and Northumberland. He spearheaded a rare triumph for Shropshire against a first-class county in the NatWest Trophy in 1984, winning the man of the match award aged 40 for an all-round performance as the county beat Yorkshire. At club level in the 1980s in England he played in the Birmingham League for Walsall and Old Hill in Cradley Heath.

== Awards ==
- Pride of Performance Award by the President of Pakistan in 1963.

Preceded by Asif Iqbal	Pakistan Cricket Captain; 1978–1979	Succeeded by Wasim Bari
