= Sadiq Mohammad =

Pakistani cricketer (born 1945)

Personal information
- Full name: Sadiq Mohammad
- Born: 3 May 1945 (age 81); Junagadh, Junagadh State, British India
- Batting: Left-handed
- Bowling: Legbreak googly

International information
- National side: Pakistan (1969-1981)
- Test debut (cap 61): 24 October 1969 v New Zealand
- Last Test: 30 December 1980 v West Indies
- ODI debut (cap 7): 11 February 1973 v New Zealand
- Last ODI: 5 December 1980 v West Indies

Career statistics
Competition	Tests	ODIs
Matches	41	19
Runs scored	2,579	383
Batting average	35.81	21.27
100s/50s	5/10	0/2
Top score	166	74
Balls bowled	200	38
Wickets	0	2
Bowling average	–	13.00
5 wickets in innings	–	0
10 wickets in match	–	0
Best bowling	–	2/20
Catches/stumpings	28/0	5/0
- Source: ESPNcricinfo, 4 January 2017

Sadiq Mohammad (Urdu: صادق محمد, born 3 May 1945) is a Pakistani former Test cricketer and younger brother of the Pakistani batsmen Hanif and Mushtaq Mohammad. He made his Test debut in the first Test between Pakistan and New Zealand in 1969. The 4th Test against the West Indies in 1981 was his final Test for Pakistan. He played county cricket for Gloucestershire. Sadiq also coached the Pakistan cricket team to bronze at the 2010 Asian Games. He umpired in one ODI game in 2000.

As a child, he attended the Church Mission School (CMS) in Karachi.

== See also ==
- List of One Day International cricket umpires

Preceded by Neil Hawke	Nelson Cricket Club; Professional; 1968	Succeeded by Neil Hawke
