= List of University of Karachi alumni =

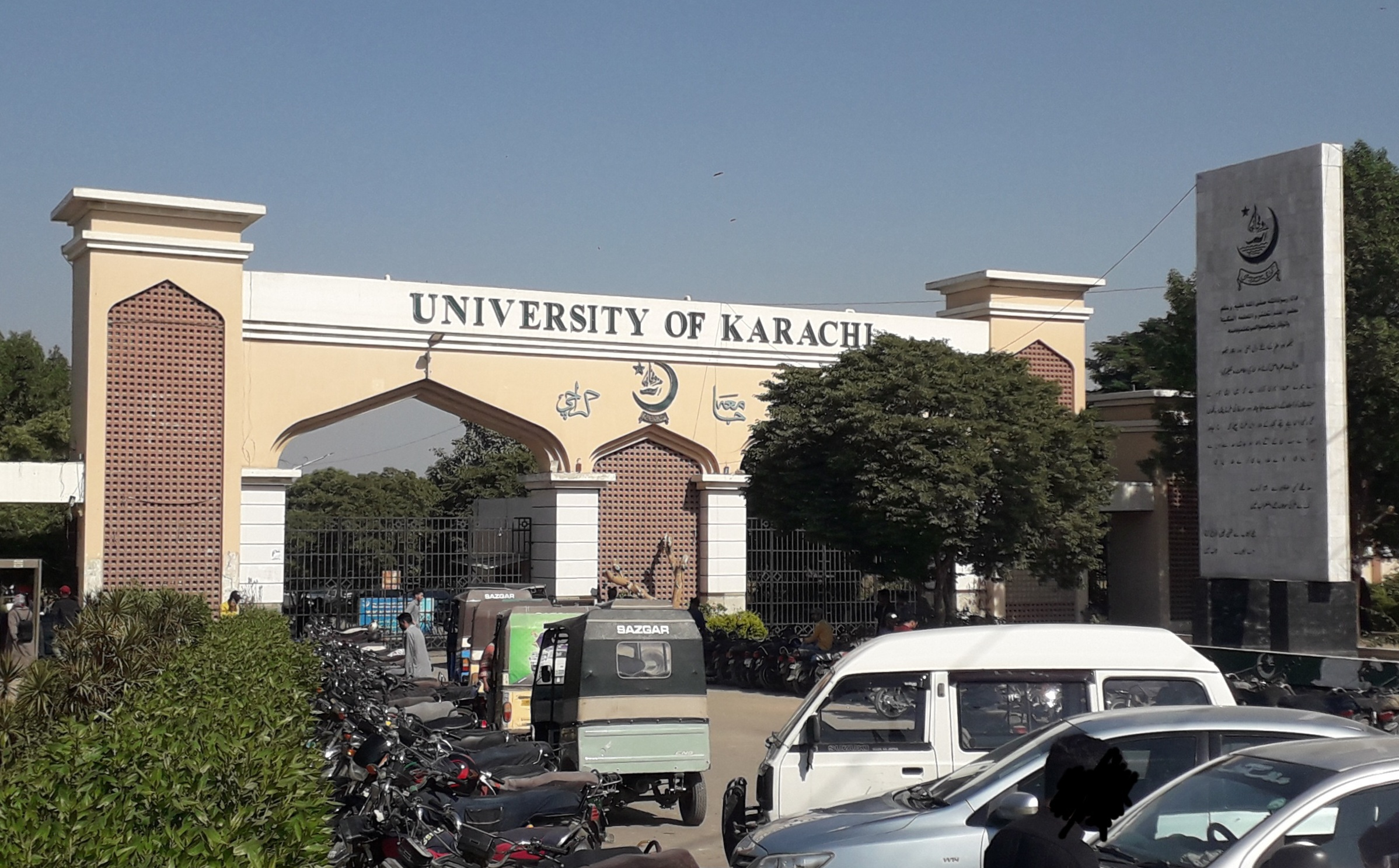
University of Karachi

This is a list of alumni of the University of Karachi.

== A ==
- Jamiluddin Aali – Urdu poet, critic, playwright, essayist, columnist, and scholar
- Ghulam Abbas Baloch – player of Pakistan national football team
- Manzoor Ahmad – philosopher
- Rukhsana Ahmad – writer, playwright, and translator
- Afaq Ahmed – leader of Mohajir Qaumi Movement Pakistan
- Israr Ahmed – Pakistan-based Muslim religious figure
- Mohammed Ajeeb – former Lord Mayor of Bradford
- Munir Akram – former Pakistan ambassador to the United Nations
- Ahmed Ali – co-founder of Progressive Writers Movement & Association; novelist; short story writer; critic; translator; diplomat; scholar
- Sohail Aman – Chief of Air Staff of the Pakistan Air Force
- Zafar Ishaq Ansari – scholar of Islamic studies
- Moinuddin Aqeel – author, critic, linguist, scholar of Urdu literature and linguistics
- Shakil Auj – Scholar of Islamic Studies and founder of Al-Tafseer Welfare Trust
- Shaukat Aziz – former Prime Minister of Pakistan; former Citibank executive officer
- Aamir Liaquat Hussain - Pakistani TV Host

== B ==
- Wali Khan Babar – GEO News journalist
- Maula Bakhsh – captain of Pakistan national football team
- Anmol Baloch – television actress and model
- Sanam Baloch – television actress
- Ansar Burney – human rights and civil rights activist

== D ==
- Noon Meem Danish – poet
- Joseph R. D'Cruz – professor of strategic management at the University of Toronto's Rotman School of Management

== F ==
- Aslam Farrukhi – Urdu author, critic, poet, linguist, scholar and broadcaster
- Tarek Fateh – writer, novelist, columnist, author
- Farman Fatehpuri – author, researcher, critic, linguist and scholar of Urdu literature and linguistics

== G ==
- Khalida Ghous – scholar of international relations and human rights; activist

== H ==
- Husain Haqqani – Pakistan's ambassador to the United States
- Hussain Haroon – Pakistan's ambassador to the United Nations
- Abrar Hasan – lawyer and constitutional expert
- Masuma Hasan – first female Ph.D. and first female Federal Secretary of Pakistan
- Syed Munawar Hasan – Ameer, Jamaat-e-Islami Pakistan
- Nehal Hashmi – Senator, General secretary PML-N Sindh
- Mehwish Hayat – model
- Zahida Hina – columnist, author, poet
- Altaf Hussain – leader and founder of the Muttahida Qaumi Movement

== I ==
- Ibn-e-Insha – Urdu poet humorist and travelogue writer

== J ==
- Jameel Jalibi – linguist, critic, writer, researcher, educationist and scholar of Urdu literature
- Nasreen Jalil – Naib Nazima of Karachi; MQM leader
- Sana Javed – actress and model, best known for blockbuster drama Khaani

== K ==
- Abul Khair Kashfi – author, researcher, critic, linguist and scholar of Urdu literature and linguistics
- Hiroji Kataoka – scholar of Urdu in Japan; exchange student in the early 1970s
- Abdul Qadeer Khan – scientist and metallurgical engineer, widely regarded as the founder of the uranium program of the country's atomic bomb projects
- Makhdoom Ali Khan – former Attorney General of Pakistan

== L ==
- Anthony Theodore Lobo – Roman Catholic bishop

== M ==
- Rehman Malik – senator, Minister of Interior, Government of Pakistan
- A. C. Matin – microbiologist and immunologist
- Nisar Memon – former Federal Minister for Information and Broadcasting
- Ajmal Mian – former Chief Justice of Pakistan
- Haseena Moin – playwright, drama writer
- Waheed Murad – film actor
- Madiha Imam - Pakistani actress

== N ==
- Farooq Naek – Chairman of the Senate of Pakistan, ex-Law Minister
- Abdul Hameed Nayyar – physicist, peace activist
- Michael Nazir-Ali – Bishop of Rochester in the Church of England
- Asif Noorani – newspaper and television writer

== P ==
- Zinia Pinto – principal of the elite St Joseph's Convent School (Karachi) from 1963 to 1999

== Q ==
- Abul Quasem – politician of Council Muslim League and finance minister of East Pakistan in 1971
- Muhammad Ahmed Qadri – Islamic scholar and political scientist, founder of Islamic Educational and Cultural Research Center
- Pirzada Qasim – scholar, Urdu poet and Vice Chancellor of the University of Karachi

== R ==
- Raza Rabbani – senator
- Atta ur Rahman – chairman of HEC; director of H.E.J. Research Institute of Chemistry
- Raheel Raza – author
- Nisha Rao – lawyer and activist

== S ==
- Faisal Sabzwari – deputy parliamentary leader of MQM
- Nida Sameer – anchorperson of Geo News
- Syed Sajjad Ali Shah – former Chief Justice of Pakistan
- Rashid Minhas Shaheed – PAF Officer; received Nishan-e-Haider
- Parveen Shakir – Urdu poet, teacher, civil servant of the Government of Pakistan
- Bina Shaheen Siddiqui
- Muhammad Ali Siddiqui – philosopher and critic
- Naweed Syed - inventor of the neurochip
- Nazim Hussain Siddiqui – former Chief Justice of Pakistan
- Saeeduzzaman Siddiqui – former Chief Justice of Pakistan
- Shahid Aziz Siddiqi – former Federal Secretary, Vice Chancellor Ziauddin University
- Takeshi Suzuki – professor of Urdu in Japan, exchange student from 1960 to 1962
- Salman F Rahman - Bangladeshi businessman and a former member of the Jatiya Sangsad

== T ==
- Atif Tauqeer – journalist, poet, writer and vlogger

== U ==
- Taqi Usmani – Hanafi Islamic scholar; served as a judge on the Shariah Appellate Bench of the Supreme Court of Pakistan

== W ==
- Fauzia Wahab – politician in the Pakistan Peoples Party
- Raees Warsi – poet; author; founder and president of Urdu Markaz New York

== Z ==
- Muhammad Ziauddin – Pakistani journalist, economist and historian
