= Nasreen & Alam Sher Foundation =

The Nasreen & Alam Sher Foundation
- Founded: February 2007
- Founder: Dr. Alam & Mrs. Nasreen Sher
- Type: Non-Profit Organization 501(c)(3)
- Purpose: Health, Education, Humanities & Peace
- Location: Chelsea, Maine, United States
- Region served: Globally
- Key people: Dr. Alam Sher - President & Co-Founder Mrs. Nasreen Sher - Co-Founder
- Website: www.sherfoundation.org Facebook: www.facebook.com/NASherFoundation Twitter: twitter.com#!/Sher_Foundation

The Nasreen and Alam Sher Foundation, (also known as: NASF, N.A. Sher Foundation or Sher Foundation ) was started in February 2007, and is a United States-based organization with one major goal: to help those in need. Since its inception, the NASF has expanded in members and support worldwide. It is an organization run completely non-governmental, non-religious, non-political, and non-profit. Recognized by the United Nations, this organization was created to promote health, education, humanities, and peace in South Asian countries and beyond. The emphasis remains on human development, freedom, human rights, quality and equality of the lives of ordinary people.

== Board of directors ==
The Nasreen and Alam Sher Foundation is run by a ten-member board of directors. Some of the board members also hold positions such as, vice president, secretary, and treasurer, etc. The NA Sher Foundation also hold presence in Pakistan, India, Bangladesh, and Sri Lanka. Each of the South Asian countries is represented by a vice president, with a vote. Every decision is made based on a majority vote. After receiving its 501(c) (3) status, the foundation started to accept donations.

== Founders ==
Nasreen and Alam Sher are the founders of the NASF. In traditional Punjabi love stories, the title of the story is always the couple's name, with the woman's name mentioned first. To honor this tradition and his wife, Dr. Sher named the foundation the Nasreen and Alam Sher Foundation. Mrs. Nasreen Akhtar Sher serves as the co-founder. Meeting as children in Lahore, Pakistan, they have been married since January 1974. They have two grown children and one grandchild. Dr. Sher graduated from Karachi University with his B. Pharmacy degree, (see List of University of Karachi alumni), PharmD degree from Creighton University, Omaha, Nebraska. He also has a Master of Business Administration degree from Liberty University in Lynchburg, Virginia. Dr. Sher completed his residency in Psychiatric Pharmacy Practice with the University of Texas in Austin. He was also Higher Education Commission of Pakistan (HEC) visiting scholar to College of Pharmacy, Faculty of Pharmacy and Alternative Medicine, Islamia University, Bahawalpur, Pakistan.

== Education ==
=== Schools ===
Government High School in Mozang

In 2007, the NASF donated chairs for teachers as they did not have any to sit on. They would use desks as chairs and sometimes use benches that students sat on to rest their feet while teaching classes. Because of this, many students would either have to stand or sit very crowded on other benches. The Government High School has also received a refurbished library, completed with books, from the NASF. The library is named the "Sher's Den." "Sher" in Punjabi, their native tongue, means "lion". The school, which is an over 125 year old all-boys school, is the alma mater of Dr. Sher, his father and grandfather. In 2008, the N.A. Sher Foundation provided computers for the school also, starting a computer lab.

Fatimah Girls School (Begum Naseem Rehman Memorial Park)

The Fatimah Girls School in Lahore, Pakistan, was given a merry-go-round, swing set, and monkey bars from the NASF. The playground was named after Dr. Sher's late sister, Begum Naseem Rehman, with whom he had shared a fond memory at that very same spot.

=== Scholarships ===
The NASF has awarded two students education scholarships, one girl from Pakistan and one boy from India. Arbaaz Khan is a young street boy from India. During the day he works and in the evening he goes to school and also helps teach other younger students. The organization has also awarded one Higher Education Scholarship to a young girl named Anam. Anam is studying to become a chartered accountant.

=== Malala Yousafzai Science Laboratory ===
The Nasreen and Sher Foundation donated equipment and furniture for a teaching science laboratory for chemistry, physics, and biology to a girls high school at Kamalpur, Punjab, Pakistan. The NASF board of directors approved to name the laboratory as "Malala Yousafzai Science Laboratory" to honor and support Ms. Yousafzai's mission of improving awareness for education for girls and women of the World. Ms. Malala Yousafzai survived an attack on her life and has now become an international iconic figure for this cause.

=== 2012 Faculty of Pharmacy, University of Karachi Graduate Directory ===
The Nasreen and Alam Sher Foundation sponsored and funded a 2012 Doctor of Pharmacy graduates of Faculty of Pharmacy, University of Karachi. The compilation of data of recent graduates should help them to find employment. The graduates directory will be distributed among major hospitals, pharmaceutical industry, and government agencies.

== Health ==
=== Eye Camps ===
The Nasreen and Alam Sher Foundation has provided free medical services, performing over 1,000 cataract removal surgeries in Pakistan in 2010–2011. The foundation provided five eye camps, by the medical director of the NASF, Dr. Sultan Ali, and his medical staff performed cataract-removal surgeries. A cataract is a clouding of the lens of the eye or its surrounding transparent membrane that obstructs the passage of light Cataracts are problems for many people in rural villages, like many of the places the NASF held these eye camps. Poor hygiene and living circumstances contribute to the condition. Many of the patients walked long distances, some up to eight hours, just to receive the care they so desperately needed. The first Eye Camp was set up in Sachal Goth, Sindh, Pakistan. In the first Eye Camp, there were 137 patients who showed up, most of them children, in need of care. The NASF held four more Eye Camps December 2010 through January 2011. During these Eye Camps they also did check-ups and treated other illnesses.

First corneal graft (keratoplasty) recipient

The first corneal graft recipient was a girl that was twelve years old. The girl was born completely blind, but she and her family walked many miles to see if the eye camps the NASF hosted in Pakistan could help her. Unfortunately, the NASF did not have the resources available to help her see. When Dr. Sher and members of the NASF returned to the United States, he showed a picture of the girl to a co-worker, Susanne Hawkins, who immediately volunteered to pay for the procedure. It took some time to find the girl again, but when the NASF did, they told her of the news. She had the surgery April 26, 2011, and she can now see. Her story was written in the Kennebec Journal.

=== Aisha Bibi Memorial Hospital (ABMH) ===
In 2011, the Nasreen and Alam Sher Foundation and the Tanzeem Sehat Samaj Sangat Gadap (TSSS), another non-profit organization, combined their efforts and started the Aisha Bibi Memorial Hospital, (ABMH), in the Konkar Village in the outskirts of Karachi, Pakistan. The hospital sits on two acres of land and houses a maternity ward and an eye clinic. All their services are free to any who needing medical care. In 2011, the ABMH also added a dental clinic, vaccinations for children, a medical laboratory and family planning services all free of charge.

Bhriaee Pandhi Maternity Home

The Bhriaee Pandhi Maternity Home opened its doors August 12, 2011. The home was named after the great humanitarian and president of the Tanzeem Sehat Samaj Sudhar Sangat Gadap, Pandhi Faqir, who has spent much of his life in social work and helping others. The first child born there was a girl named Bhriaee Khaskheli, after the maternity home. Bhriaee, which means "full of life", was born on August 16, 2011, to Lala and Fehmida Khaskheli. At the time of her birth, there were already six more families waiting to have their children born at the Bhriaee Phandi Maternity Home. In September 2011, a second child was born at the maternity home.

Dr. Sultan Ali Free Eye Clinic

Dr. Sultan Ali, renowned eye surgeon and medical director of the N.A. Sher Foundation, has performed tens of thousands of eye surgeries, most of which were free of charge. This eye clinic is named in honor of him and his work. The free eye clinic is providing eyeglasses, check-ups, and cataract removal surgeries.

Dr. Sultan is a graduate of Dow Medical College, Karachi. He completed his house job (residency) with Liaquat National Hospital in Karachi. Almost 40 years ago, while still a medical student, he started his career working and doing humanitarian work for Abdul Sattar Edhi. As a matter of fact, both Dr. Sultan Ali and Pandhi Faqir are old friends of Edhi and have collaborated with him for countless humanitarian projects. After holding it for many years, he retired from the position of Superintendent of historic Spencer Eye Hospital, Karachi, Pakistan. He serves as Medical and Health Director for the NASF.

Free Medical Camp at ABMH

In collaboration with Dr. Irfan Qasim Ali and GADAP Development Social Welfare Organization, the Nasreen and Alam Sher Foundation sponsored 2 weekends of free medical camp at Aisha Bibi Memorial Hospital in November 2011. Dr. Ali of Maine General Medical Center, Waterville, Maine, led a team of doctors, mid-level practitioners and volunteers to make this all happened. The camp was hugely successful and surpassed initial goal of treating 1000 patients. Over 2000 patients were triaged and treated for a whole host of illnesses such as tuberculosis, diabetes, renal, hepatitis, scabies, respiratory, cardiovascular and others. Patients also received a month supply of medicine.

== Humanities ==
=== Flood relief efforts ===
In 2010 when much of Pakistan was ravaged by severe flooding, the N.A. Sher Foundation was quick to step in and provide aid. Over 1,000,000 homes were swept away by the raging waters, leaving over twenty million homeless. Many lost livestock and other possessions in the floods. Surgeon Dr. Sultan Ali, medical director for the NASF, led a team of doctors setting up medical camps in five different locations throughout Pakistan. There, they treated over 600 patients afflicted with waterborne, skin, and respiratory diseases free of charge. The N.A. Sher Foundation also set up a tent city, donating 25 tents as temporary housing, and 100 mosquito nets. They also provided 4,000 syringes, 2,000 disposable gloves, medical gauze, and other medical materials.

=== Mass weddings ===
When the floods destroyed many of the villages and homes, many couples had to put their wedding plans on hold. The Nasreen and Alam Sher Foundation held mass weddings for 25 couples from 15 different villages in Pakistan, December 25, 2010. In addition to the ceremonies, the NASF, provided each couple with a bed, bedding, kitchen utensils, fashion jewelry, and a dresser. In traditional South Asian weddings, there are typically three ceremonies, lasting three days. The NASF provided clothing for each of the brides and grooms for each day. They also provided enough food to last the newlyweds a whole month. Each of the brides was given a sewing machine so that they could help with the family income and sew clothes for others. The grooms were given each a brand-new bicycle so that they could easily get around. A self-taught social worker, Phandi Faqir, organized many of the activities of the mass weddings. The founders, Dr. and Mrs. Sher were both interviewed by Wish TV, a local Sindhi station.

== Peace ==
=== Annual Peace Camp ===
Annual Peace Camp by Standing Together To Enable Peace (STEP). In 2012, the NASF was one of the supporter of an annual peace camp organized by the Standing Together to Enable Peace (STEP), a non-profit foundation and trust based in Delhi, India. The camp was held in September 2012 at Srinagar, J&K, India.

== Fundraisers ==
Because the foundation is non-profit, it relies and runs completely on donations.

The Taste of South Asia: Cultural Variety Show

The Taste of South Asia: Cultural Variety Show is an annual event and fundraiser. Typically, there is a meal provided as well as music from different parts of the world. In August 2010, much of Pakistan, had been destroyed and left millions homeless. Much of the funding for the relief efforts came from donations of those in attendance. This event featured world-renowned Sufi singer/songwriter, Dhruv Sangari, along with other musicians from Colby College. All the money raised went towards food, water, medical supplies, mosquito nets, and other essentials.

Hope: NASF CD Album

The NASF has compiled a group of Sufi songs on a CD, simply titled "hope", to help raise money for their cause. The music is a mixture of Punjabi, English, and Urdu languages.

== Recognition ==
Six different newspapers in Maine, the birthplace of the NASF, featured articles about the NASF on May 10, 2010, There were the Kennebec Journal, The Morning Sentinel, and The Portland Press Herald. They were also featured in the Valley Voice, Capital Weekly, and the Good News Gazette, smaller local newspapers in Maine. In addition, The Pakistani newspapers, The Weekly Nai Haqaiq, The Daily Jazba, the Daily Aaina-e-Inqilab, also reported on the accomplishments of the NASF.

=== Awards ===
2010 Humanitarian Award, Dept of Pharmacognosy, Faculty of Pharmacy, Karachi University, Pakistan.

2011 NASF Humanitarian of the Year Award:

The Nasreen and Alam Sher foundation board of directors presented its very first Humanitarian of the Year Award to Dr. Syed Irfan Qasim Ali at a ceremony held at the Maine General Medical Center's Cancer Center in Augusta, Maine. Dr. Ali was presented with an Award and a certificate. He was instrumental in providing medical care to over 2100 patients at a free medical camp held over 2 weekends on November 19–20 and 26–27, 2011 at Aisha Bibi Memorial Hospital (ABMH), Konkar Goth, GADAP, Karachi. He also arranged for a 1–2 month medication supply for these patients. Some of the patients probably saw a physician for the first time in their lives. Dr. Ali is still following up a few of these patients after making arrangement to be seen at a teaching hospital. He also arranged and lend a hand in selecting used medical equipment and supplies to be used at ABMH. In collaboration with NASF, Dr. Ali has also afforded for a corneal transplant to a needy person. His conspicuous and generous contributions and time for his community is exemplary. Dr. Ali humanitarian efforts reflect great credit upon himself, his family, and his community. Many congratulations to Dr. Syed Irfan Qasim Ali, the recipient of 2011 NASF Humanitarian of the Year Award!"
