= Shinji Maejima =

Japanese Orientalist (1903-1983)

- Born: January 20, 1903; Fuefuki, Yamanashi Prefecture, Japan
- Died: June 3, 1983 (aged 80); Tokyo
- Other name: 前嶋 信次
- Occupations: Orientalist, Scholar of Islamic studies

Shinji Maejima (前嶋 信次, Maejima Shinji; July 20, 1903 – June 3, 1983) was a Japanese orientalist.

== Biography ==
=== From birth to graduation of university ===
Shinji Maejima was born at Fuefuki, Yamanashi Prefecture in 1903. His family were doctors. He grew up in his hometown until his secondary education. He entered Tokyo University of Foreign Studies in 1921, and majored French language course. After graduation, he entered University of Tokyo. He studied Pali and Sanskrit in the oriental history seminar. In March 1928, he graduated with a BA from the University of Tokyo, and left for Taiwan.

=== As an Orientalist (By the end of the Pacific War) ===
He became a research assistant of Taihoku Imperial University in April 1928. He moved to the National Tainan First Senior High School in 1932 and lectured history there. But he was appointed a researcher at the East Asiatic Economic Investigation Bureau under The South Manchuria Railway Company, Ltd., so he left Taiwan in 1940. He worked there until the end of the war. At the same time, he was also a special lecturer at Meiji Gakuin University.

=== After the War ===
He worked as a special lecturer at Keio University from 1950. In 1950, he submitted his dissertation "The ebb and flow of Islamic powers in the history of the East-West interactions"(東西交通史上に於けるイスラム勢力の消長) to Keio University and got Doctor of Letters. He was promoted to lecturer in 1954, and became a professor in 1956.

He set out to rebuild the Association for Islamic Studies in Japan with his colleagues, Hisao Matsuda and Jouhei Shimada. He was also one of the main members who established the Society for Near Eastern Studies in Japan in 1954.

== Contribution ==
He began as a Buddhist scholar, but then turned his attention to Islam, becoming a pioneering Arabist in Japan. He was the first to render the One Thousand and One Nights from the original Arabic into Japanese. He died just before the publication of a supplementary volume to his twelve-volume translation, which contains the stories of Ali Baba and Aladdin. Six more volumes were later produced by Osamu Ikeda (池田 修) to complete the series.

== Bibliography ==
=== Books ===
- "Xuanzang: Real history of "Journey to the West"『玄奘三蔵: 史実西遊記』 (Iwanami Shoten, Iwanami shinsho series, 1952)
- "Culture of Saracen"『サラセン文化』 (KOUBUNDOU Publishers弘文堂, 1955)
- "Arabian medical care"『アラビアの医術』 (Chuokoron-Shinsha, 1965)
  - (Heibonsha, Heibonsha library series, 1996)
- "Islamic world"『イスラム世界』 (Kawade Shobō Shinsha, 1968)
- "World of the One Thousand and One Nights"『アラビアン・ナイトの世界』 (Kodansha, 1970)
  - (Heibonsha, Heibonsha library series, 1995)
- "The world history of everyday life 7: Under Islam"『イスラムの蔭に』 (Kawade Shobō Shinsha, 1975)
- Eras of Islam『イスラムの時代』講談社、1977年

=== Translation to Japanese ===
- "The Rihla: A Masterpiece to Those Who Contemplate the Wonders of Cities and the Marvels of Traveling"『三大陸周遊記』 (Kawade Shobō Shinsha, 1954)
  - (Kadokawa Shoten, Kadokawa shinsho series, 1961)
- "One Thousand and One Nights"『アラビアン・ナイト』 (Heibonsha, Tōyō Bunko series, 1966–1992)
