= Anne Oi-kan Yue =

Professor of the Chinese language

- Other name: Anne Yue-Hashimoto
- Education: University of Hong Kong, University of Texas at Austin, Ohio State University
- Occupation: Linguist
- Spouse: Hashimoto Mantaro

Chinese name
- Traditional Chinese: 余靄芹
- Simplified Chinese: 余霭芹
Transcriptions
Standard Mandarin
- Hanyu Pinyin: Yú Ǎiqín
Yue: Cantonese
- Jyutping: Jyu4 Oi2kan4
- Sidney Lau: Yue^{4} Oi^{2}-kan^{4}

Anne Oi-kan Yue is a professor emeritus of Chinese at the University of Washington. Her monograph Mandarin Syntactic Structures was the first to apply generative grammar to the study of Chinese. She then moved to studies of the phonology and grammar of varieties of Chinese, producing a series of influential monographs and articles. She was president of the International Association of Chinese Linguistics from 1999 to 2001 and has been president of the Li Fang-Kuei Society for Chinese Linguistics since 2014.

== Selected publications ==
- Yue-Hashimoto, Anne (1971), Mandarin Syntactic Structures, Princeton University.
- Yue-Hashimoto, Anne Oi-Kan (1972), Studies in Yue Dialects 1: Phonology of Cantonese, Cambridge University Press, ISBN 978-0-521-08442-0.
- Yue-Hashimoto, Anne O. (1985), The Suixi dialect of Leizhou : a study of its phonological, lexical and syntactic structure, Chinese University of Hong Kong.
- Yue-Hashimoto, Anne O. (1993), Comparative Chinese Dialectal Grammar – Handbook for Investigators, Paris: École des hautes études en sciences sociales Centre de recherches linguistiques sur l'Asie orientale, ISBN 978-2-910216-00-9.
- Yue, Anne O. (1999), "The Min Translation of the "Doctrina Christiana"", Contemporary Studies of the Min Dialects, City University of Hong Kong Press, JSTOR 23833463.
- Yue-Hashimoto, Anne O. (2005), The Dancun dialect of Taishan, City University of Hong Kong.
- Yue, Anne O. (2015), "The Yue language", in Wang, William S.-Y.; Sun, Chaofen (eds.), The Oxford Handbook of Chinese Linguistics, Oxford University Press, pp. 173–188, ISBN 978-0-19-985633-6.
- Yue, Anne O. (2017), "The Sinitic languages: grammar", in Thurgood, Graham; LaPolla, Randy J. (eds.), The Sino-Tibetan Languages (2nd ed.), Routledge, pp. 114–163, ISBN 978-1-138-78332-4.
