= Yasuhiro Matsuda =

Japanese academic researcher (born 1965)

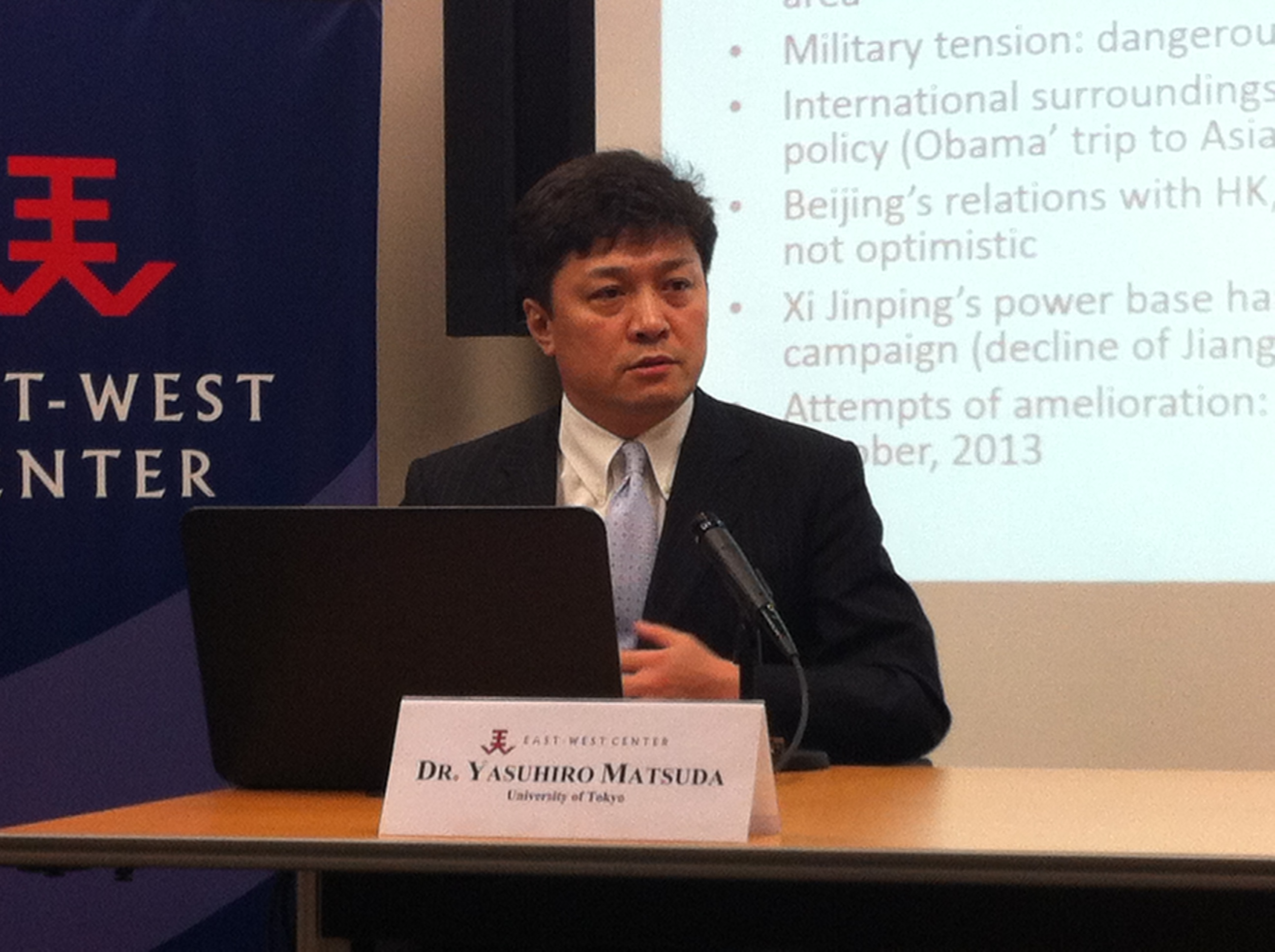
- Born: November , 1965; Japan Hokkaido
- Other name: 松田 康博
- Occupation: international politic

Yasuhiro Matsuda (松田 康博, Matsuda Yasuhiro; born November, 1965 in Hokkaido) is a Japanese professor of international politics at the University of Tokyo.

== Biography ==
Matsuda received his Ph.D. in law from Graduate School of Law at Keio University in Tokyo. He spent sixteen years in the National Institute for Defense Studies (NIDS), Japan Defense Agency (later, Ministry of Defense), as an assistant and a senior research fellow. He moved to the Institute of Oriental Culture of the University of Tokyo in 2008. He is specializing in political and diplomatic history of Asia, politics and foreign relations in the PRC and Taiwan, the Cross-Strait Relations, and Japan's foreign and security policies. He was a member of the Council on Security and Defense Capability in the New Era, the advisory group of the Prime Minister in 2010. He is the winner of the seventh Yasuhiro Nakasone Award of Excellence in 2011. He has published numerous books and articles in Japanese and English. His recent publication in English is “Taiwan in the China-Japan-US Triangle,” Gerald Curtis, Ryosei Kokubun, and Wang Jisi eds., Getting the Triangle Straight: Managing China-Japan-US Relations, New York: Japan Center for International Exchange, 2010.

== History ==
=== Education ===
- 1988 B.A. (Literature), Department of Foreign Language, Reitaku University, Chiba-ken
- 1990 M.A. (International Studies), Graduate School of Area Studies, Tokyo University of Foreign Studies, Tokyo
- 1997 Ph.D. Candidate (Law), Graduate School of Law, Keio University, Tokyo
- 2003 Ph.D. (Law), Graduate School of Law, Keio University, Tokyo

=== Academic career ===
- 1992-93 Assistant, 1st Research Office, 2nd Research Department, the National Institute for Defense Studies (NIDS)
- 1993-99 Assistant, 3rd Research Office, 2nd Research Department, NIDS
- 1999-04 Senior Research Fellow, 3rd Research Office, 2nd Research Department, NIDS
- 2004-08 Senior Research Fellow, 6th Research Office, Research Department, NIDS
- 2008-09 Associate Professor, Institute of Oriental Culture, the University of Tokyo
- 2010-11 Associate Professor, Institute of Oriental Culture, the University of Tokyo
- 2011-12 Professor, Institute for Advanced Studies on Asia, the University of Tokyo
- 2012-15 Professor, The University of Tokyo Interfaculty Initiative in Information Studies (Concurrently held the post of Professor, Institute for Advanced Studies on Asia, the University of Tokyo)
- 2015 Professor, Institute for Advanced Studies on Asia, the University of Tokyo

== Publications ==
=== Major publications in Japanese ===
- 2006: Taiwan niokeru Itto Dokusai Taisei no Seiritsu (The Birth of the One-Party Dictatorial System in Taiwan)
- 2007: Kiro ni Tatsu Nittuu Kankei: Kako tono Taiwa, Mirai eno Mosaku (Sino-Japanese Relations at the Crossroads: Dialogue with the Past and Search for the Future), co-editor with Ryoko Iechika and Duan Ruicong
- 2009: Nittai Kankei Shi: 1945-2008 (History of Japan-Taiwan Relations: 1945-2008), with Shin Kawashima, Urara Shimizu, and Yang Yung-ming
- 2009: Enuesushi, Kokka Anzenhoshou Kaigi: Shuyoukoku no Kikikanri Anposeisakutougou Mekanizumu (NSC, National Security Council: Comparative Studies of Crisis Management and Security Policy Making Mechanisms in Major Powers in East Asia), contributor and editor
- 2009: Gobunya kara Yomitoku Gendai Chuugoku: Rekishi, Seiji, Keizai, Shakai, Gaikou (Contemporary China: History, Politics, Economy, Society and Diplomacy ) (revised edition), co-editor with Ryoko Iechika and Tang Liang

=== Major publications in English ===
- 2002: Domestic Determinants and Security Policy-Making in East Asia, edited with Satu P. Limaye
- 2005: “Structural Changes in Japan-China Relations: A Japanese Perspective,” Proceedings of the International Conference on China and the Emerging Asian Century, Organised by Institute of Strategic Studies (ISS) in Collaboration with Hanns Seidel Foundation, Islamabad, Pakistan, pp. 156–167
- 2006: “An Essay on China’s Military Diplomacy: Examination of Intentions in Foreign Strategy,” NIDS Security Reports, No. 7
- 2007: “Domestic Political Determinants of China’s External Behavior,” China’s Rise and Its Limitations: China at the Crossroads, Proceedings of the NIDS International Symposium on Security Affairs, Tokyo: National Institute for Defense Studies, pp. 33–57
- 2007: “Japanese Assessments of China’s Military Development,” Asian Perspective, Vol. 31, No. 3, pp. 183–193
- 2008: “Security Relations between Japan and the PRC in the Post-Cold War Era,” Niklas Swanström and Ryosei Kokubun eds., Sino-Japanese Relations: The Need for Conflict Prevention and Management, Newcastle upon Tyne: Cambridge Scholars Publishing, pp. 66–93
- 2009: “The Prospect of China Up to 2020: A View from Japan,” Derek J. Mitchell ed., Bridging Strategic Asia: The Rise of India in East Asia and the Implications for the U.S.-Japan Alliance, Washington, D.C.: Center for Strategic and International Studies (CSIS), pp. 1–16
- 2009: “Improved Cross-Strait Relations Confusing to the Japanese,” AJISS-Commentary
- 2010: “Taiwan in the China-Japan-US Triangle,” Gerald Curtis, Ryosei Kokubun, and Wang Jisi eds., Getting the Triangle Straight: Managing China-Japan-US Relations, New York: Japan Center for International Exchange, pp. 123–143
- 2010: “Improved Cross-Strait Relations Confusing to the Japanese,” Asia Pacific Bulletin, East West Center, No. 47
- 2011: “Japan’s National Security Policy: New Directions, Old Restrictions,” Asia Pacific Bulletin, East West Center, No. 95
- 2011: “Taiwan’s Partisan Politics and Its Impact on U.S.-Taiwanese Relations,” The Journal of Social Science, Vol. 63, Nos. 3&4
