= Kiyoshi Jinzai =

Japanese writer (1903–1957)

- 神西 清
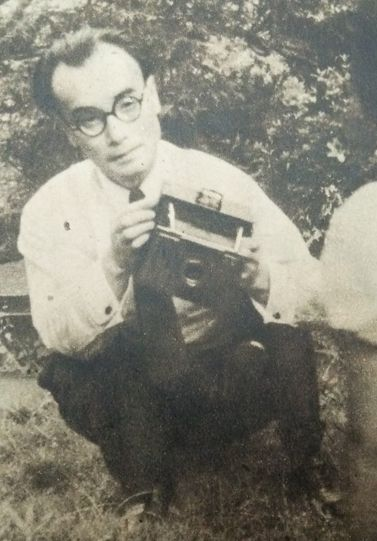
- Jinzai in June 1949
- Born: 15 November 1903; Tokyo, Japan
- Died: 11 March 1957 (aged 53); Kamakura, Kanagawa, Japan
- Resting place: Tōkei-ji, Kamakura
- Education: Tokyo University of Foreign Studies
- Occupations: Writer, literary critic
- Writing career
- Language: Japanese
- Genres: Russian literature, novels, poems, stage plays

Kiyoshi Jinzai (神西 清, Jinzai Kiyoshi; 15 November 1903 – 11 March 1957) was a Japanese novelist, Russian translator and literary critic active during the Shōwa period of Japan.

== Early life ==
Jinzai was born in Tokyo; his father was an official in the Home Ministry. As his father was frequently transferred, as a child Jinzai lived in many locations around Japan, the longest period of which was in Taiwan (then under Japanese rule). In 1911, while in Taiwan, his father contracted malaria and died in 1912. Jinzai was then raised by his maternal aunt. While in junior high school, he met Michio Takeyama, and in high school he met Tatsuo Hori, both of whom became his lifelong friends.

Initially aspiring to become an architect, he was interested in poetry and French literature, but after enrolling in the Tokyo University of Foreign Studies, he changed to Russian instead. While still a student, he co-founded the literary magazine Hoki ("Broom") with Takeyama Michio and Hori Tatsuo. The magazine gave him a foundation to publish his own plays, poems and translations of foreign literature. After graduation, he worked briefly for the Hokkaido University library, then with the Tokyo Denki Nippo newspaper, before being hired by the Soviet trade office. In 1932, he decided to work as an author full-time.

== Literary career ==
Jinzai is known for his translations of the works of the French writers André Gide and Marcel Proust, and the works of the Russian writers Alexander Pushkin, Ivan Turgenev and Anton Chekhov. Among his most noted translations is Chekhov's Uncle Vanya.

In addition to translation work, he also wrote his own novels, notably Hairo no me no onna ("Girl with Grey Eyes") and Shonen ("Boy"), the critical work, Shi to shosetsu no aida ("Between Verse and Fiction"), and an anthology of poems. Jinzai had a very diverse output, ranging from historical novels, literary critiques, verse, and stage plays. Jinzai was especially active in promoting modern Japanese theater, which he strongly felt should be performed in modern Japanese, rather than the archaic forms found in kabuki or noh drama. With the playwrights Kunio Kishida and Tsuneari Fukuda, he established his own theater company, Kumo no kai ("Clouds").

== Private life ==
Jinzai relocated to Kamakura, Kanagawa prefecture in 1934, but moved back to Tokyo to be closer to his publisher and theater. During World War II, he moved to Saitama prefecture for safety. After the war, he returned to Kamakura, where he lived to his death. He died in 1957 at the age of 53 from tongue cancer. His grave is at the temple of Tōkei-ji in Kamakura. His was a lifelong friend of the poet and novelist, Hori Tatsuo.

== See also ==
- Japanese literature
- List of Japanese authors
