= Mari Yonehara =

- 米原 万里
- Born: April 29, 1950; Tokyo, Japan
- Died: May 25, 2006 (aged 56); Kamakura, Kanagawa, Japan
- Education: Tokyo University of Foreign Studies, University of Tokyo
- Occupations: Translator, Essayist, Non-fiction writer, Novelist, Interpreter
- Employer(s): Russian Language Interpreter Association(President, 1995–1997, 2003–2006)
- Notable work: Uso-tsuki Ānya no Makka na Shinjitsu
- Television: The Broadcaster (TBS)
- Awards: Sōichi Ōya Non-fiction Prize; Bunkamura Deux Magots Literary Prize

Mari Yonehara (米原 万里, Yonehara Mari; 29 April 1950 – 25 May 2006) was a Japanese translator, essayist, non-fiction writer, novelist, and simultaneous interpreter between Russian and Japanese, best known in Japan for simultaneous interpretation in the 1980s and 1990s and writing in 2000s.

== Biography ==
Yonehara was born in Tokyo. Her father, Itaru, was a member of the Japan Communist Party and had a seat in the lower house of the Japanese Diet representing Tottori Prefecture. Her grandfather, Yonehara Shōzō, was President of Tottori Prefecture Assembly, and a member of the House of Peers.

In 1959, Itaru was sent to Prague, Czechoslovakia as an editor of The Problems on Peace and Socialism, an international communist party magazine and his family accompanied him. Mari initially studied the Czech language, but her father placed her in an international school run by the Soviet Union, where education was conducted in Russian language so that his children were able to continue the language in Japan. The school curriculum was heavy on communist indoctrination, and Yonehara's classmates included children from over 50 countries.

Yonehara returned to Japan in 1964, and after graduation from high school, attended the Tokyo University of Foreign Studies, majoring in the Russian language. She also joined the Japan Communist Party. She then attended a postgraduate program at the University of Tokyo, where she received master in Russian literature and Russian culture. After she left the university, she taught Russian at the Soviet Gakuin (present day Tokyo Russian Language Institute) and the Bunka Gakuin's "university division", while working as an interpreter and translator part-time. In 1980, she co-founded the Russian Language Interpreter Association (ロシア語通訳協会, Roshiago Tsūyaku Kyōkai) and became its first secretary-in-chief. She was the president of the Association from 1995-1997 and from 2003 until her death in 2006.

With the demise and the collapse of the Soviet Union, her services for translation and interpretation were much in demand by the news agencies, television and also by the Japanese government, and she was also requested to assist during the visit of Russian president Boris Yeltsin to Japan in 1990.

From April 1997 to March 1998, she appeared on the public broadcaster NHK's Russian language educational program.

In 2001 she received the Sōichi Ōya Non-fiction Prize (大宅壮一ノンフィクション賞, Ōya Sōichi Non-fikushon Shō) for The Deep Red Truth of Anya the Liar (嘘つきアーニャの真っ赤な真実, Uso-tsuki Ānya no Makka na Shinjitsu) (ISBN 978-4-04-883681-4) about the search for her classmates at Prague after the collapse of the Soviet Bloc.

In 2003 she received a Bunkamura Deux Magots Literary Prize (ja:Bunkamuraドゥマゴ文学賞, Bunkamura Dumago Bungaku Shō) for her long novel Olga Morisovna's Rhetorical Question (オリガ・モリソヴナの反語法, Origa Morisovuna no Hango-hō) (ISBN 978-4-08774572-6) published in 2002, about an old female dancer living the Soviet era.

From 2003, she was a regular commentator on TBS television's Saturday evening news show, The Broadcaster (ブロードキャスター, Burōdokyasutā). Her hobbies included the Japanese word play (駄洒落, dajare), sex-themed jokes (下ネタ, shimoneta), and she kept numerous dogs and cats. She never married.

== Nicknames ==
Her nicknames in her own essays: (all these come from Japanese feeble jokes ->) "La Dame Aux Camelias" (in Japanese [tsubaki hime] means both "lady of camelias" and "lady of saliva"; for she was capable to take dry sandwiches at once with no drink), and, "The Tongue Slipping Beauty" (in Japanese [zekka bijin]; for she had a cynical view, and [zekka] is close to the sound 月下美人 (gekka bijin), Epiphyllum oxypetalum. [bijin] means "the beauty")

She was also an active member and official of the Japan PEN.

== Death ==
She died of ovarian cancer at her home in Kamakura, Kanagawa, aged 56.
