= Takeshi Suzuki (academic) =

Takeshi Suzuki (鈴木斌; 1932–2005) was a Japanese professor of Urdu. He was known in Pakistan as Japan's "Baba-e-Urdu" (Father of Urdu) for his work in the promotion of the language.

== Career ==
Suzuki studied at the University of Karachi from 1960 to 1962 on a Pakistani government scholarship. He joined the faculty of the Tokyo University of Foreign Studies in 1963. Among his students was Hiroji Kataoka, a self-described failing student who, inspired by Suzuki's teaching, himself would go on to become a professor of Urdu and make important contributions to Urdu studies in Japan. In 1996, the Pakistani government conferred the civil decoration Sitara-i-Imtiaz upon him.

== Death ==
After a long battle with cancer, Suzuki died on 14 January 2005. The Department of Urdu at the University of Karachi held a condolence ceremony in his memory. He left behind an unfinished manuscript of a 20,000-word Urdu-Japanese dictionary, which is being finalised for publication by his colleague Hiroshi Hagita. His personal library contained a number of rare books, which he left to TUFS after his death.

== Works ==
=== Textbooks ===
Suzuki's Urdu textbooks have become part of the standard Urdu curriculum in Japan. Among his major pedagogical works are:

- 鈴木斌 [Suzuki Takeshi] (1978), ウルドゥー語基礎1500語 [1,500 Basic Urdu Words], 大学書林, OCLC 54599269
- 鈴木斌 [Suzuki Takeshi]; 麻田豊 [Yutaka Asada] (1980), ウルドゥー語常用6000語 [6,000 Common-Use Urdu Words], 大学書林, JPNO 80021519
- 鈴木斌 [Suzuki Takeshi] (1981), 基礎ウルドゥー語 [Basic Urdu], 大学書林, OCLC 54600246
- 鈴木斌 [Suzuki Takeshi] (1986), 基礎ウルドゥー語読本 [Basic Urdu Reader], 大学書林, OCLC 54600268
- 鈴木斌 [Suzuki Takeshi]; ムハンマド・ライース・アラヴィー [Muhammad Rais Alavi] (1987), 実用ウルドゥー語会話 [Practical Urdu Conversation], 大学書林, JPNO 88016362
- 鈴木斌 [Suzuki Takeshi]; 麻田豊 [Yutaka Asada] (1992), 日本語ウルドゥー語小辞典 [Small Japanese-Urdu Dictionary], 大学書林, OCLC 47433299
- 鈴木斌 [Suzuki Takeshi] (1996), ウルドゥー語文法の要点 [Important Points of Urdu Grammar], 大学書林, ISBN 4-475-01824-2

=== Literary translations ===
In the late 1980s, Suzuki worked with his student Hiroji Kataoka on translation of the short stories of Saadat Hasan Manto into Japanese. He later collaborated with Muhammad Rais Alavi of the University of Karachi on translation of Japanese poetry into Urdu, including the Man'yōshū and Sankashū (a 12th-century waka collection).

- 鈴木斌 [Suzuki Takeshi]; 片岡弘次 [Kataoka Hiroji] (December 1988), 黒いシャルワール：マントー短編集 [Black Shalwar: Manto Short Story Collection], 大同生命国際文化基金 [Daidō Life Insurance International Culture Foundation], JPNO 89038266
- 鈴木斌 [Suzuki Takeshi]; 片岡弘次 [Kataoka Hiroji] (March 1990), グルムク・スィングの遺言：マントー短編集 [Gurmukh Singh's Last Wish: Manto Short Story Collection], 大同生命国際文化基金 [Daidō Life Insurance International Culture Foundation], JPNO 91024252
