= Tokyo University of Foreign Studies =

National university in Tokyo, Japan

Coordinates: 35°40′24″N 139°31′11″E

- 東京外国語大学
- Former name: Tokyo School of Foreign Languages
- Type: National
- Established: 1873 / 1949
- Affiliations: FUU, EUIJ, CESFNUTA
- President: Nobuo HARUNA
- Faculty: 230
- Administrative staff: 337
- Undergraduates: 3,769
- Postgraduates: 573
- Location: Fuchu, Tokyo, Japan
- Campus: Suburban
- Colors: Peony pink
- Nickname: TUFS
- Mascots: Tobita-kun, Tuf-Kujira
- Website: www.tufs.ac.jp/english/

Tokyo University of Foreign Studies (東京外国語大学, Tōkyō Gaikokugo Daigaku), often referred to as TUFS, is a specialist national research university in Fuchū, Tokyo, Japan.

TUFS is primarily devoted to foreign language, international affairs and area studies. The Research Institute for Languages and Cultures of Asia and Africa (ILCAA), also known as the AA-ken (AA研), is part of TUFS.

== History ==
The University is the oldest academic institution devoted to international studies in Japan. It began as Institute for Research of Foreign Documents (蛮書調所, Bansho Shirabesho), a Tokugawa shogunate's translation bureau set up in 1857.

It was subsequently established as an independent educational and research institution with the name Tokyo School of Foreign Languages (東京外国語学校, Tokyo Gaikokugo Gakko) in 1873 and gained independence in 1899.

In 1949, it was formed as a new-system university as the Tokyo University of Foreign Studies (東京外国語大学, Tokyo Gaikokugo Daigaku), with only one undergraduate program with twelve departments. In 1999, the University celebrated both the 126th anniversary of its original establishment and the 100th anniversary of its independence. In 2000, the campus was moved to its present location, where students can study in a modern, hi-tech environment.

In 2012, the Faculty of Foreign Languages was reorganized and the School of Language and Culture Studies and the School of International and Area Studies were established. In 2019, the School of Japan Studies was established.

== Student life ==
=== Campus ===
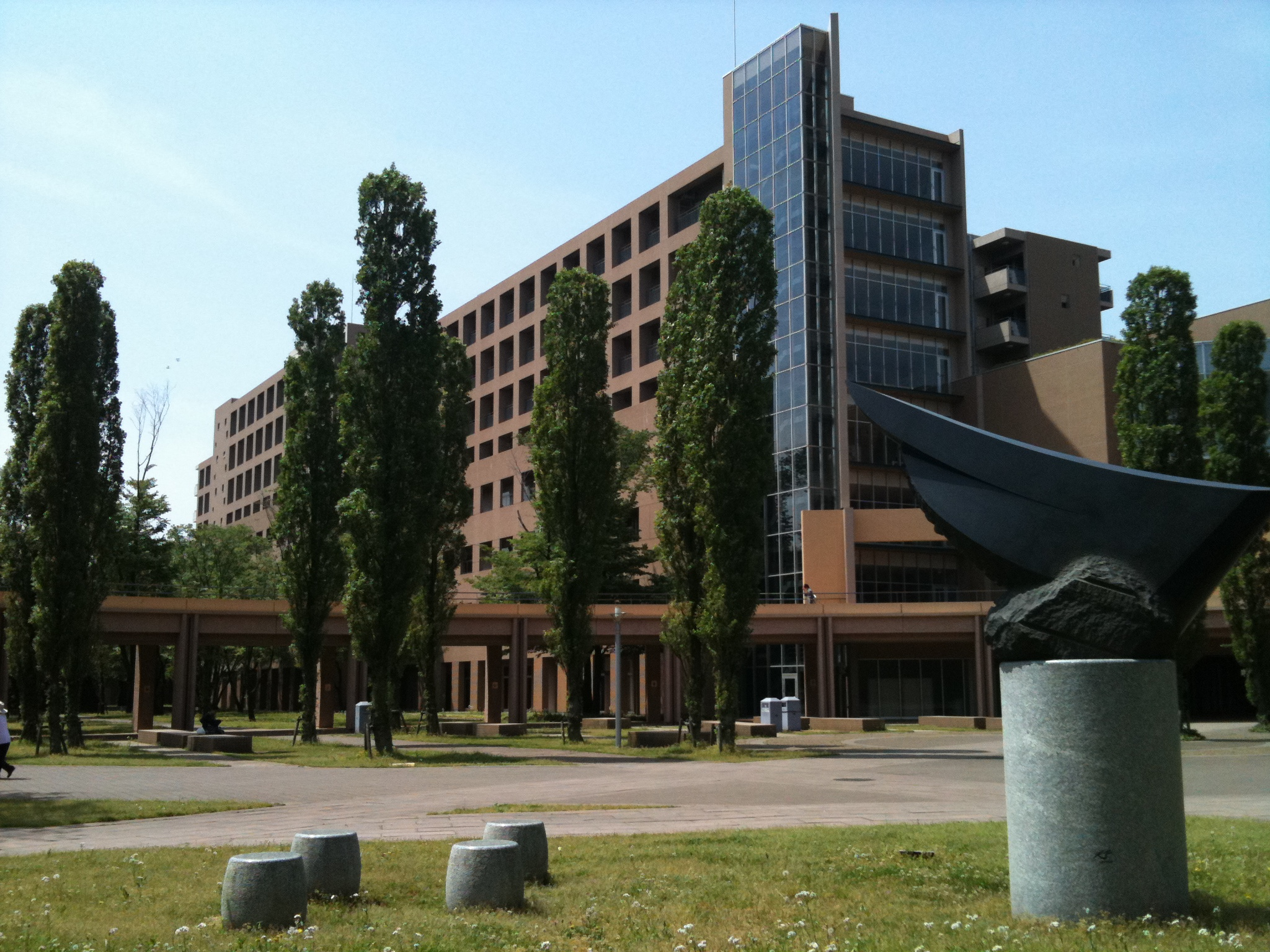
Building for lectures and studies

The primary TUFS campus in Fuchu is situated in Asahi-cho near Tama Station of the Seibu Tamagawa Line. Classes are mainly held in the Research and Lecture building and, for international students, the Japanese Language Center (留学生日本語教育センター). The campus also features a library, gymnasium, sports field, cafeteria, and small shop, with another convenience store located adjacent to the North Arrival Court.

SWA Group, a prominent landscape architecture firm, designed a gathering space for the campus, repurposing a former military base to create a multifunctional space suitable for social gatherings as well as studying. The space honors the Japanese belief that trees represent souls and SWA carefully transplanted or incorporated all of the trees from the existing forest. Beyond being featured in Roger Yee's Educational Environments and Walter Roger's textbook Professional Practice of Landscape Architecture: A Complete Guide to Starting and Running Your Own Firm, the plaza won a National ASLA Design Merit Award in 2003.

=== Dormitories ===
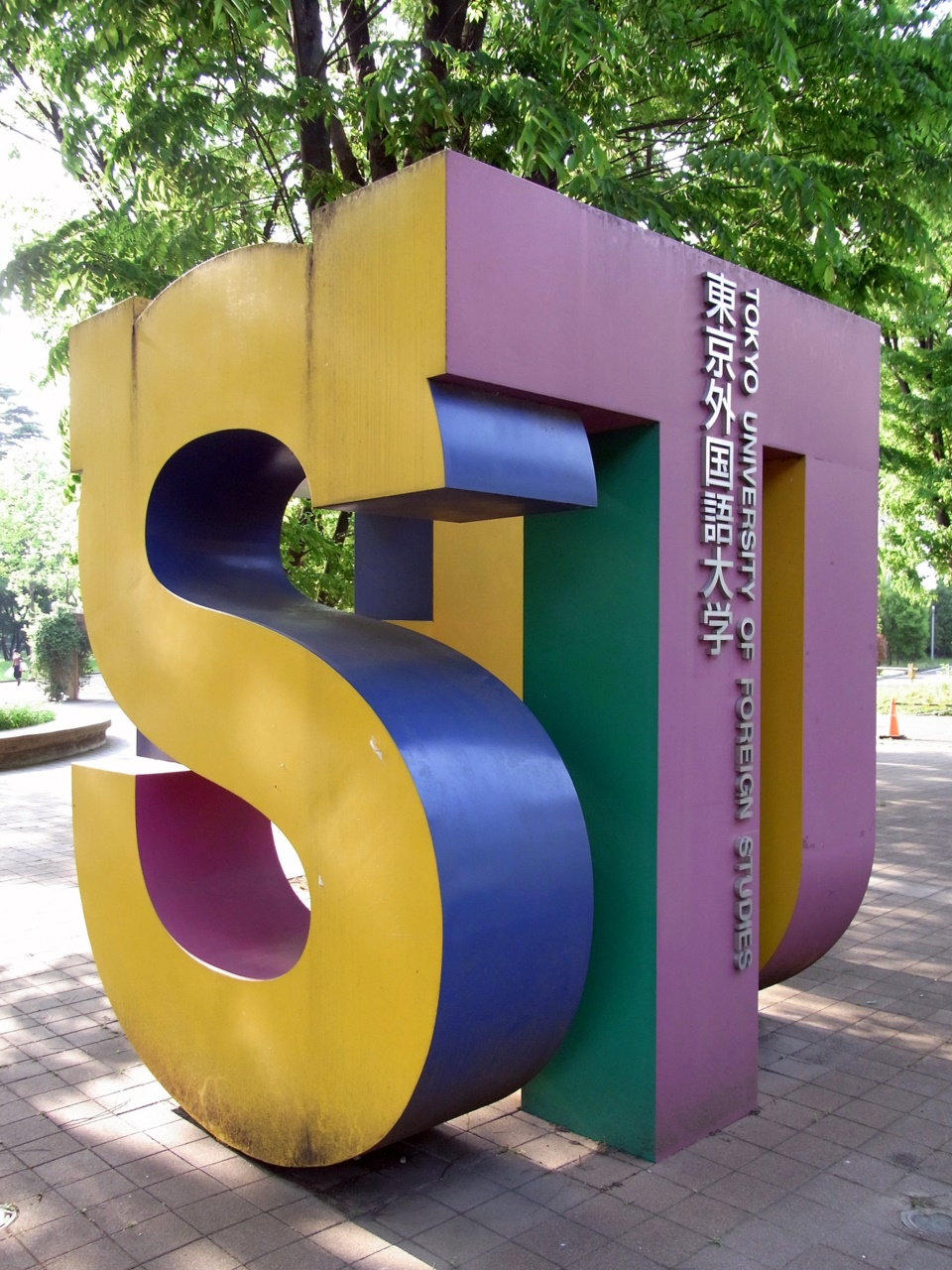
Sign of TUFS

On-site accommodation is available to international students and local students, in the form of the three International Residence Halls located at the 'rear' of the campus by the sports field. Two of the buildings provide studio apartment-sized single rooms for incoming students, as well as a limited number of 'family'-sized apartments. Arranged in a wedge-shaped configuration, two sides of the wedge are lined with rooms, with an uncovered atrium in the centre. Completed first, amenities such as a communal kitchen and music room are located in Building 1. Building 2, completed later and featured to the right, moves the showers (and hot water supply) out of the individual rooms and to a communal shower and laundry area located on each floor. The newest Building 3 is located next to Building 2 and offers single rooms to international and local students.

=== Festival (Gaigosai) ===
The School Festival of TUFS, Gaigosai, which usually takes place in the end of November, is known for its originality. Freshmen provide food of the countries they major in and Sophomore plays drama in the language they major. The plays are called gogeki (language plays). They sometimes use drama texts written in the language, but they often translate works in another language by themselves. Gogeki was given some grant by Japanese government.

== Academics ==
There are three (undergraduate) schools and one graduate school:

Schools and Programs
Degree	Schools	Programs
Undergraduate	School of Language and Culture Studies	English, German, Polish, Czech, French, Italian, Spanish, Portuguese, Russian, Russian and Uzbek, Mongolian, Chinese, Korean, Indonesian, Malay, Filipino, Thai, Laotian, Vietnamese, Cambodian, Burmese, Urdu, Hindi, Bengali, Arabic, Persian, Turkish
Undergraduate	School of International and Area Studies	Northwest Europe and North America, Central Europe, Southwest Europe, Iberia and Latin America, Russia, Central Asia, East Asia, Southeast Asia 1 (Islands), Southeast Asia 2 (Mainland), South Asia, The Middle East, Africa, Oceania
Undergraduate	School of Japan Studies	Japanese/Japan
Graduate (Master)	Graduate School of Global Studies	Global Studies, Japan Studies
Graduate (Doctorate)	Graduate School of Global Studies	Global Studies, Japan Studies, Sustainability Research

== Rankings ==
University rankings
Global

National
- * The data of NBP is in 2009 rankings because of availability.

TUFS is a specialized institution only in foreign language, international affairs and foreign studies, thus it is not as well known as other big universities such as University of Tokyo and Kyoto University. However, its prestigious position in Japan can be seen in the several rankings below.

=== General ===
The university has been ranked 34th, 23rd and 20th out of 181 major universities during 2008–2010 in the "Truly Strong Universities" ranking published by Toyo Keizai.

According to the survey conducted by Nikkei HR in 2013, the TUFS won the first place in "working skills" ranking among Japanese universities. It shows that students grow their "working skills" through their studies at the university and they will learn faster and be operational once they have started their career.

=== Research ===
Weekly Diamond reported that TUFS has the 5th highest research standard in Japan in terms of research fundings per researcher in COE Program. In the same article, it's also ranked 3rd in terms of the quality of education by GP funds per student.

=== Alumni ===
According to the Weekly Economist's 2010 rankings, graduates from TUFS have the 16th best employment rate in 400 major companies.

École des Mines de Paris ranks TUFS University as 92nd in the world in 2011 in terms of the number of alumni listed among CEOs in the 500 largest worldwide companies, although TUFS is a smaller university compared to other Japanese universities in the ranking.

=== Selectivity ===
TUFS is one of the most selective universities in Japan. Its entrance difficulty is usually considered one of the top among 180 national and public universities.

=== Business ===
In the 2010 Survey by Weekly Economist on the ranking of universities according to the numerousness of the number of the officers & managers produced by each university in consideration of the number of graduates, TUFS was ranked 6th out of all the 778 universities which existed as of 2010.

== Partner universities ==
TUFS has partner universities in 35 countries.

- Taiwan: National Chengchi University, National Taiwan University
- Indonesia: Gajah Mada University, University of Indonesia
- Malaysia: National University of Malaysia
- South Korea: Yonsei University, Seoul National University, Hankuk University of Foreign Studies
- Laos: National University of Laos
- Mongolia: National University of Mongolia
- Philippines: University of the Philippines Diliman
- Thailand: Srinakharinwirot University
- Vietnam: VNU University of Social Sciences and Humanities (formerly Université Indochinoise)
- Singapore: National University of Singapore
- India: University of Delhi
- Cambodia: Royal University of Phnom Penh
- China: Shanghai International Studies University
- Hong Kong: The Chinese University of Hong Kong, The University of Hong Kong
- Australia: The Australian National University
- Brazil: Universidade Federal do Parana, Universidade do Estado do Rio de Janeiro
- Turkey: Ankara University, Boğaziçi University, Çanakkale 18 Mart University
- Syria: University of Damascus
- Egypt: Cairo University, Ain Shams University
- Canada: University of British Columbia
- United States: University of California, San Diego, Cornell University, California State University, Fresno, Columbia University, University at Albany, State University of New York, Mills College
- Uzbekistan: Tashkent State Institute of Oriental Studies
- Czech Republic, Charles University in Prague, Palacký University Olomouc
- France: Universite de la Sorbonne Nouvelle-Paris III, Institut d'Etudes Politiques de Paris, Institut National Des Langues et Civilisations Orientales de Paris
- Ireland: University College Cork
- Italy: Instituto Universitario Orientale di Napoli, Universita degli Studi di Venezia, Universita degli Studi di Torino
- Portugal: Universidade de Coimbra
- Spain: Autonomous University of Madrid, Autonomous University of Barcelona, University of Seville, Pompeu Fabra University
- United Kingdom: School of Oriental and African Studies, University of London, Leeds University, University of Manchester, University of Essex
- Russia: Russian State University for the Humanities
- Germany: Philipps-Universität Marburg, Friedrich-Alexander-Universität Erlangen-Nürnberg, Justus-Liebig-Universität Gießen, Bielefeld University, Georg-August-Universität Göttingen

== Notable people ==
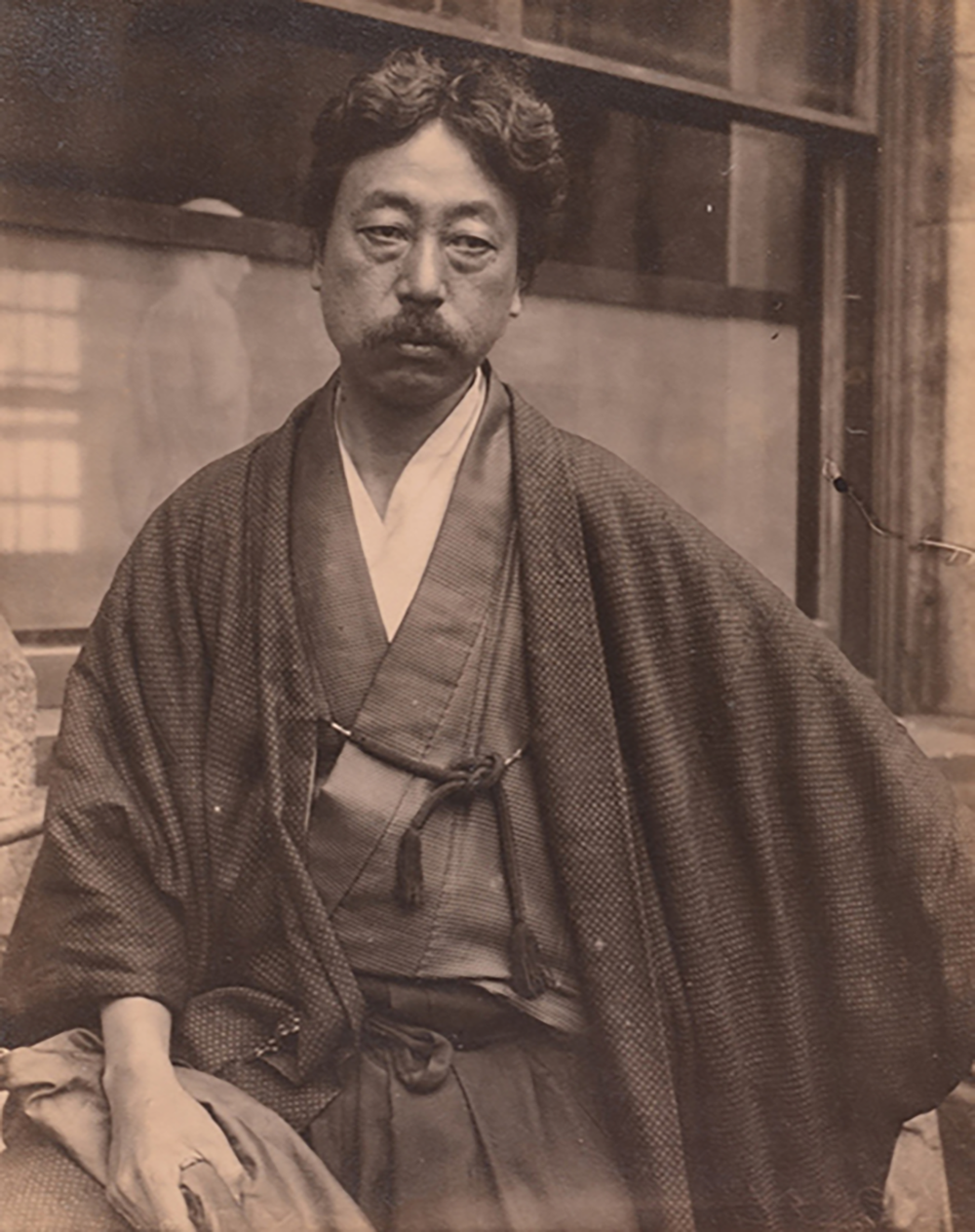
Okakura Kakuzō, Japanese scholar who contributed to the development of arts in Japan.

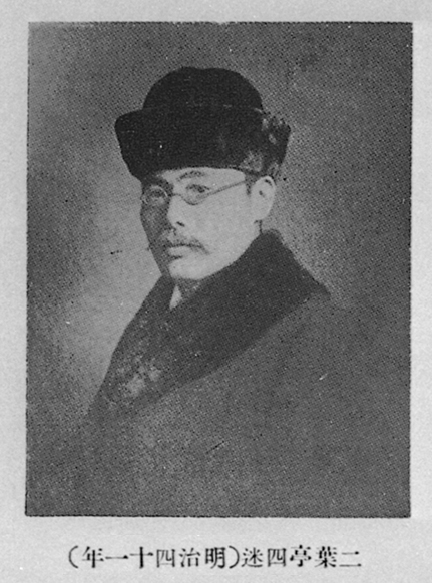
Futabatei Shimei, Japanese novelist

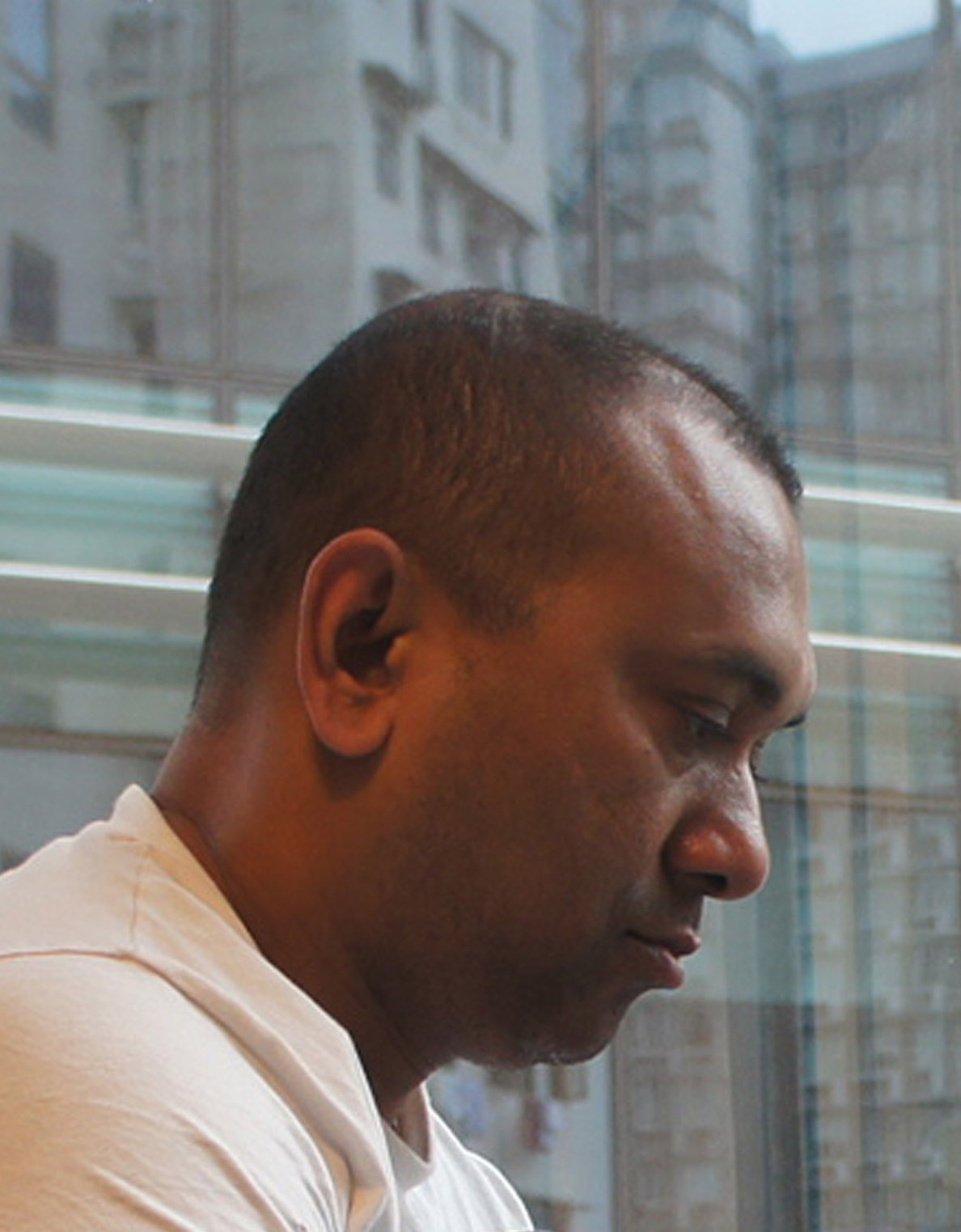
Firoz Mahmud, educator and visual artist from Bangladesh

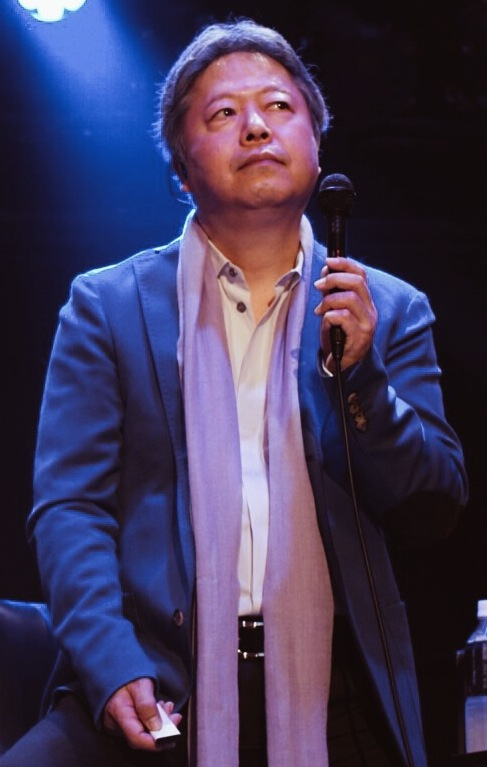
Yukihide Takekawa, Japanese singer-songwriter

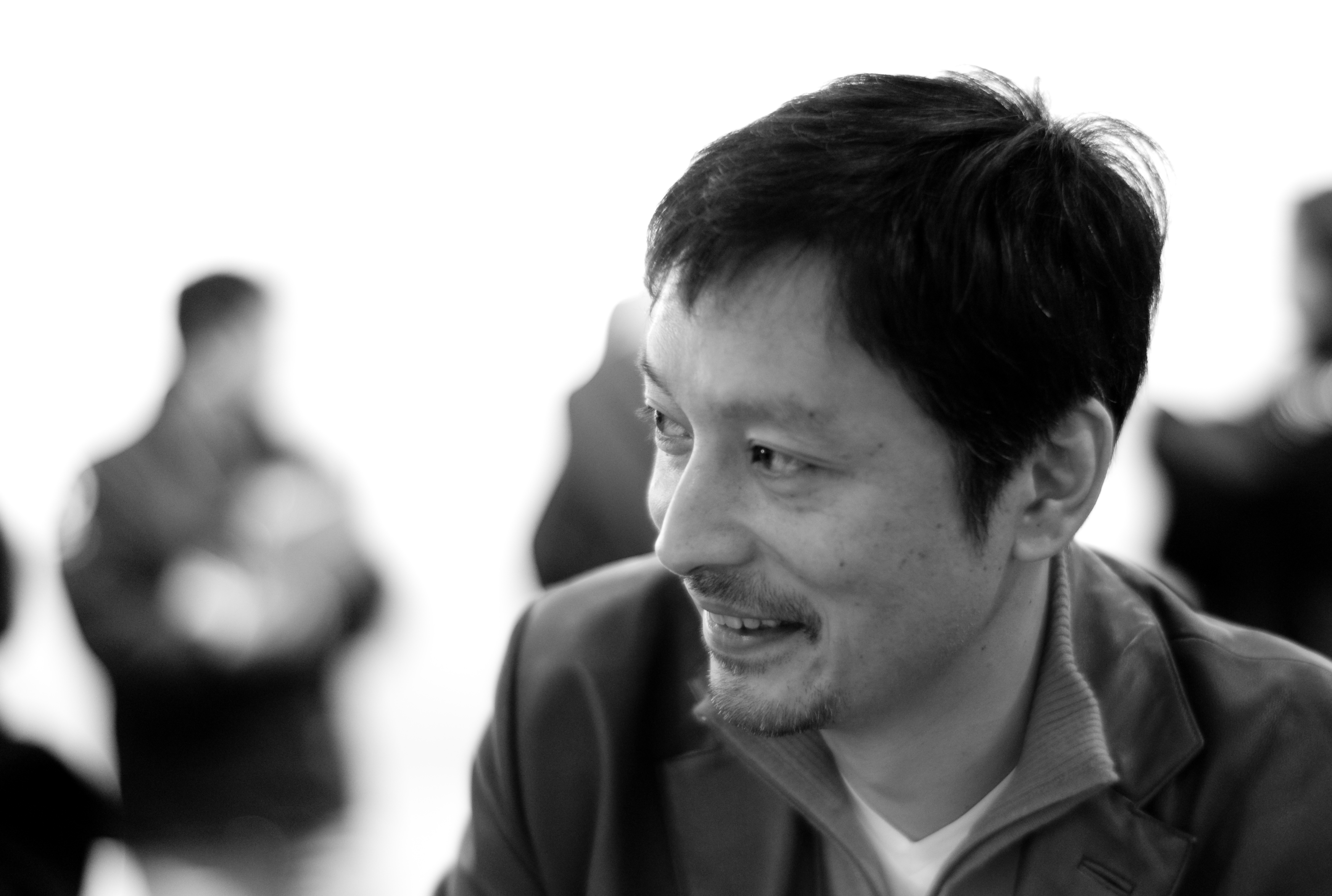
Masahiko Shimada, Japanese novelist and winner of Izumi Kyōka Prize for Literature

=== Alumni ===
- Futabatei Shimei, novelist
- Nitobe Inazō, educator
- Firoz Mahmud, visual artist, Bangladesh
- Jinzai Kiyoshi, novelist
- Jun Ishikawa, author
- Masahiko Shimada, author
- Nankichi Niimi, author
- Chūya Nakahara, poet
- Kafū Nagai, author
- Mari Yonehara, essayist
- Oh Seon-hwa, Professor at Takushoku University
- Hamada Kazuyuki, politician, Member of the House of Councillors, Parliamentary Vice-Ministers for Foreign Affairs
- Hashimoto Ben, politician, Member of the House of Representatives of Japan
- Hashimoto Mantaro, linguist and sinologist
- Hiroshi Saitō, politician, former Governor of Yamagata Prefecture
- Uchiyama Iwataro, politician, former Governor of Kanagawa Prefecture
- Nakajima Mineo, First President of Akita International University, a former President of Tokyo University of Foreign Studies
- Sakai Kuniya, President of Kanda University of International Studies
- Sakae Osugi, Anarchist
- Yasuhiko Nagano, Deputy Director-General of Graduate University for Advanced Studies, Professor Emeritus of National Museum of Ethnology (Japan)
- Matsuzono Makio, Professor Emeritus, Fourth Director-General of National Museum of Ethnology (Japan)
- Hiroji Kataoka, Professor of Urdu at Daito Bunka University
- Shinji Maejima, Orientalist
- Okakura Kakuzō, scholar
- Maeda Yoshinori, Tenth President of NHK
- Morohoshi Sayaka, journalist
- Okakura Kakuzō, scholar
- Shinichiro Sawai, Film Director
- Yoshio Ōkubo, President of Nippon Television
- Yukihide Takekawa, singer-songwriter, Vocalist of Godiego
- Yūko Nakamura, actress
- Genki Hitomi, Singer, Vocalist of Vow Wow
- Aoki Satoshi, former Chairperson of Honda, a former Chairperson of Japan Automobile Manufacturers Association
- Yamashita Hideki, President of Shueisha
- Murakami Koichi, former President of Fuji Television
- Hasegawa Kouji, first CEO of Shuto Expressway
- Mizukami Kenya, former Chairperson of Yomiuri Shimbun
- Arakawa Shoshi, CEO of Bridgestone
- Fujiwara Sakuya, former Bank of Japan Vice President
- Saiga Fumiko, former Judge of the International Criminal Court, a former Japanese Ambassador to the United Nations
- Sato Satoru, Japanese Ambassador to Spain
- Yamamoto Keiji, Japanese Ambassador in charge of Inspection
- Komano Kinichi, Japanese Ambassador to Iran
- Nishioka Atsushi, Japanese Ambassador to Djibouti
- Sato Soichi, Japanese Ambassador to Dominican Republic
- Hoshi Hideaki, Japanese Ambassador to Estonia
- Myoui Ryozo, Japanese Ambassador to Angola
- Minagawa Kazuo, Japanese Ambassador to Uganda
- Fujita Tadashi, former Japanese Ambassador in charge of disarmament and nonproliferation
- Tanaka Saburo, former Japanese Ambassador to Cuba, Deputy director of Naicho
- Inoue Masayuki, former Japanese Ambassador to Bangladesh
- Hanada Marohito, former Japanese Ambassador to Mongolia
- Kidokoro Takuo, former Japanese Ambassador to Mongolia
- Nakasone Goro, former Japanese Ambassador to Paraguay
- Honda Hitoshi, former Japanese Ambassador to Finland
- Tokura Eiji, former Japanese Ambassador to Sweden
- Arai Koichi, Last Japanese Ambassador to East Germany
- Tanabe Ryuichi, former Japanese Ambassador to Poland
- Katsu Shigeo, Vice President of World Bank
- Kanbara Masanao, CEO of Mitsubishi Rayon
- Kuwahara Michio, CEO of Daiei
- Shimizu Shinjiro, former President of Mitsui & Co.
- Kodera Kei, former President of Toys "R" Us (Japan)
- Hidaka Nobuhiko, President of Gartner (Japan)
- Keizo Morikawa, President of Cosmo Oil
- Melt-Banana, musician
- Jalsan, tulku and Professor of Mongolian at Inner Mongolia University
- Takuma Nakahira, photographer and photography critic
- Yasuhiro Matsuda, professor of University of Tokyo (international politics), Yasuhiro Nakasone Award (2011)

=== Faculty ===
- Daryoush Ashouri, visiting professor
- Isolde Standish is an Australian and British Humanities Scholar and Film theorist specialised in East Asia.
- Kitamura Hajime, linguist
- Izumi Hoshi, linguist
- Masao Yamaguchi, anthropologist, professor emeritus
- Nakae Chomin, former president
- Tadahiko Shintani, linguist
- Takeshi Suzuki, professor of Urdu
- Ram Prakash Dwivedi, Visiting Professor
