= Hashimoto Mantaro =

Japanese sinologist (1932–1987)

Hashimoto Mantarō
- Born: November 26, 1932; Japan Gunma
- Died: June 7, 1987 (aged 54); Tokyo
- Other names: 橋本 萬太郎; Mantarō J. Hashimoto
- Education: University of Tokyo, Ohio State University
- Occupation: Sinologist
- Years active: 22
- Notable work: The Hakka Dialect
- Spouse: Anne Oi-kan Yue

Hashimoto Mantarō (橋本 萬太郎; 26 November 1932 – 7 June 1987) was a Japanese sinologist and linguist who is best known for advocating research on language geography, linguistic typology, and how different areal features in the varieties of Chinese (such as tonal distinctions) reflect contact with other language families.

== Life and career ==
Mantarō J. Hashimoto was born in Sawano-mura (沢野村), Nitta District, Gunma (currently Ōta City). In 1955, he received a BA in Chinese Literature from the University of Tokyo, and began graduate studies, but dropped out of the doctoral course in 1960. He obtained a PhD in linguistics from Ohio State University in 1965, and his dissertation was on the phonology of Ancient Chinese. From 1966 to 1969, he was a visiting professor at the University of Hawaii, Osaka City University, and Princeton University. Hashimoto became an assistant professor at the Institute for Asian and African Languages and Cultures, Tokyo University of Foreign Studies in 1970 and Professor in 1973, where he remained for the rest of his life.

Mantarō Hashimoto was married to Anne Oi-kan Yue-Hashimoto, who is currently Professor Emeritus of Chinese Language and Linguistics at the University of Washington.

In 2002, the International Association of Chinese Linguistics established the Mantarō J. Hashimoto Award for Chinese Historical Phonology.

Hashimoto and his research are still mentioned internationally among East Asian linguists (JCIEA 2011: 80). According to one prominent linguist of Chinese, Hashimoto blazed the trail for two fields of research: the effect that geography has on historical linguistics, and how areal features in the varieties of Chinese (previously called "dialects") reflect prolonged language contact with other language families (Wang 1987: 378).

Professor Hashimoto was a leading advocate of studying different areal features to gain information on the historical development of the Chinese language. He analyzed the Chinese varieties in northern and southern China and noticed the further north one traveled in China, the more the Chinese varieties began to resemble the Altaic languages that bordered them. Conversely, as one traveled south in China, the varieties began to resemble Austroasiatic languages that bordered them in the south. Hashimoto theorized that the varieties of Chinese had been heavily influenced by the non-Chinese languages on their periphery (Wadley 1996: 99–100). For examples, northern varieties have comparatively fewer tonal distinctions and more polysyllabic words than southern Chinese varieties with complex tonal systems and more monosyllabic words. The syntax of sentence structure is frequently subject–object–verb in northern varieties and subject–verb–object in southern ones. Grammatical modifiers contrast between to modifier-modified word order in the north and modified-modifier in the south (Wadley 1996: 102).

== Selected works ==
The polyglot Mantarō Hashimoto was a prolific writer of scholarly publications in Japanese, English, and Chinese (see Tsuji 1988 for details). His subjects included phonology, lexicology, dialectology, Sinitic languages, Hakka Chinese, Taiwanese Hokkien, and the influence of Altaic languages on Mandarin Chinese. Some English-language examples:

- "The Bon-shio (文昌) Dialect of Hainan — A Historical and Comparative Study of Its Phonological Structure, First part: The Initials" (1960), Gengo Kenkyū 言語研究 (Journal of the Linguistic Society of Japan) 38: 106–135.
- "The hP'ags-pa transcription of Chinese plosives" (1967), Monumenta Serica 26: 149–174.
- The Hakka Dialect: A Linguistic Study of its Phonology, Syntax and Lexicon (1973), Cambridge University Press.
- The Newari Language: A Classified Lexicon of Its Bhadgaon Dialect (1977), Institute for the Study of Languages and Cultures of Asia and Africa.
- "Current Developments in Sino-Vietnamese Studies" (1978), Journal of Chinese Linguistics 6.1: 1-26.
- The Phonology of Ancient Chinese (1978, 1979), 2 vols., Institute for the Study of Languages & Cultures of Asia & Africa.
- "Typogeography of phonotactics and suprasegmentals in languages of the East Asian continent" (1980), Computational Analyses of Asian & African Languages 13: 153–164.
- The Be Language: A Classified Lexicon of Its Limkow Dialect (1980), Institute for the Study of Languages and Cultures of Asia and Africa.
- "A phonological characterization of syllabic intonations in the so-called tone languages" (1981), in Linguistics across continents: Studies in honor of Richard S. Pittman, ed. by Andrew B. Gonzalez and David D. Thomas, Summer Institute of Linguistics 147–155.
- The Altaicization of Northern Chinese (1986), in Contributions to Sino-Tibetan Studies, ed. by John F. McCoy and Timothy Light, E. J. Brill, 76–97.
- "Hakka in Wellentheorie Perspective" (1992), Journal of Chinese Linguistics 20.1: 1-48.
