= Hiroji Kataoka =

Hiroji Kataoka (片岡弘次; born 1941) is a Japanese professor of Urdu at Daito Bunka University in Tokyo, where he also serves as dean of the Faculty of International Relations and director of the Institute of Contemporary Asian Studies.

== Early life and career ==
Kataoka was born in Saitama Prefecture. He entered the Tokyo University of Foreign Studies' Urdu department in 1964. He describes himself as being an initially unmotivated student, even once failing a class in his second semester. However, he was inspired to work harder after his professor, Takeshi Suzuki, assigned Krishan Chander's short story Sufaid Phool as class reading. The story describes a young mute boy who had fallen in love with a girl but had no way to express his feelings to her except through glances and gestures, which echoed a situation Kataoka was facing in his personal life with a girl he liked but to whom he was too afraid to speak. In the early 1970s, he attended a two-year course in Urdu at the University of Karachi. He joined the faculty of Osaka University in 1974, and moved to Daito Bunka University in 1986.

== Awards and honours ==
In 2009, the Pakistani government announced that it would confer the country's third highest civil honour, the Sitara-i-Imtiaz, upon Kataoka for his contributions in the field of education.

== Works ==
Kataoka has published over 60 research papers on Urdu literature and language as well as the culture of Pakistan, in addition to his work in translating South Asian poetry and literature into Japanese. Among the works he has translated are:

- 片岡弘次 [Kataoka Hiroji] (1975), ふあいず詩集 [Faiz Poetry Collection], 大阪外国語大学インド・パーキスターン研究室 [Osaka University of Foreign Studies Indo-Pakistan Research Institute], JPNO 75028515. Translation of poetry by Faiz Ahmed Faiz.
- 鈴木斌 [Suzuki Takeshi]; 片岡弘次 [Kataoka Hiroji] (December 1988), 黒いシャルワール：マントー短編集 [Black Shalwar: Manto Short Story Collection], 大同生命国際文化基金 [Daidō Life Insurance International Culture Foundation], JPNO 89038266. Translation of short stories by Saadat Hasan Manto.
- 鈴木斌 [Suzuki Takeshi]; 片岡弘次 [Kataoka Hiroji] (March 1990), グルムク・スィングの遺言：マントー短編集 [Gurmukh Singh's Last Wish: Manto Short Story Collection], 大同生命国際文化基金 [Daidō Life Insurance International Culture Foundation], JPNO 91024252. Translation of short stories by Saadat Hasan Manto.
- 片岡弘次 [Kataoka Hiroji] (June 1994), ファイズ詩集 [Faiz Poetry Collection], 未來社 [Miraisha], ISBN 978-4-7602-1268-2, JPNO 94061545. Further translation of poetry by Faiz Ahmed Faiz.
- 片岡弘次 [Kataoka Hiroji] (February 2006), ガーリブ詩集 [Ghalib Poetry Collection], 花神社 [Kashinsha], ISBN 978-4-7602-1583-6, JPNO 21005395. Translation of the Diwan-i-Ghalib by 19th-century poet Mirza Ghalib.
