= Izumi Hoshi =

Japanese scholar of Tibetan linguistics

Izumi Hoshi (星 泉, Hoshi Izumi; born 1967) is a Japanese scholar of Tibetan linguistics at the Tokyo University of Foreign Studies. Born in Chiba, she is the daughter of the equally noted Tibetan linguist Michiyo Hoshi.

== Education ==
- 1991 University of Tokyo Faculty of Letters graduation
- 1993 The University of Tokyo Graduate School of Humanities and Social Sciences Graduate Degree
- 1997 PhD in the "descriptive study of the meaning of the predicate in Lhasa Tibetan"

== Career ==
- 1997 Assistant Professor, Tokyo University of Foreign Studies, Languages and Cultures of Asia and Africa
- 2004 Associate Professor
- 2015 Full Professor

== Awards ==
- March 2006, Japan Society for the Promotion of Science Award and Japan Academy Academic Award.

== Publications ==
As listed by WorldCat, and Research on Tibetan Languages (a wikibook),

- (1993).「チベット語ラサ方言の非完了・継続状態を表わす動詞述語について」『東京大学言語学論集』 13, pp. 415–446, 1993.
- (1994a). "On the nonperfect continuative aspect of the Lhasa dialect of modern Tibetan." Current Issues in Sino-Tibetan Linguistics. Kitamura Hajime et al. eds. Osaka: The Organizing Committee, the 26the International Conference on Sino-Tibetan Languages and Linguistics. 985–991.
- (1994b) チベット語ラサ方言における動詞述語V-ki^reeの意味. [The meaning of V-ki^ree in the verbal predicates of Lhasa Tibetan.] 日本西蔵学会々報 40: 53–60.
- (1996).『チベット語ラサ方言の述語「動詞+chun」の意味と用法』 東京大学言語学論集 Tokyo University Linguistic Papers 15: 203–229.
- (1998). チベット語ラサ方言の述語の意味分析上の諸問題 : 述語動詞yonを含む述語の意味分析を例に. [Various problems in the semantic analysis of predicates in Lhasa Tibetan: the example of the semantic analysis of the verbal predicate yon.]" アジア・アフリカ言語文化研究所通信 ILCAA newsletter 92: 80-81
- (1998).「チベット語ラサ方言における述語動詞yonの意味」『言語研究』 113: -96, 1998.
- (2001). "The Meaning of the Lhasa Tibetan Predicate "V-kyu + predicate verb"" 東京大学言語学論集 Tokyo University Linguistic Papers 20: 261-274.
- (2001) チベット文学の幕開け, 週刊朝日百科世界の文学, 113号, 71-73.
- (2002) 現代チベット語の名詞化接辞を持つ述語の意味---名詞述語から動詞述語への拡張と展開---, 東京大学言語学論集, 20巻, 261--274, 2001年
- (2002) チベットの笑い話(1), 通信, 113号.
- (2002) Web環境での多言語表示, ITUジャーナル, 32巻5号, 26--29.
- (2002) 古代チベットの王家の谷で---撮影現場レポート& その後---, 『古典学の再構築』 研究費補助金 特定領域研究「古典学の再構築」, 12号, 66-67.
- (2003) 現代チベット語ラサ方言の動詞の研究, 『南アジア諸言語に関する基礎語彙・文法調査』 科学研究費補助金（基盤研究(A)(2)）研究成果報告書, 79-100.
- (2003) チベット文字における結合文字の使用に関する調査, 論集「情報処理」「古典学の再構築」研究成果報告集, 4巻, 141-144.
- (2003). 現代チベット語動詞辞典 : ラサ方言 Gendai Chibettogo dōshi jiten : Rasa hōgen / A verb dictionary of the modern spoken Tibetan of Lhasa. Tokyo: 東京外国語大学アジア・アフリカ言語文化研究所 Tōkyō Gaikokugo Daigaku Ajia Afurika Gengo Bunka Kenkyūjo.
- (2004) チベット語の接辞-nan(-mkhan)の文法化-専門家から人へ,人から属性へ Asian and African linguistics アジア・アフリカ文法研究 33: 115-138.
- (2004) Displaying multi-script date on the Web, Proceedings of the Glyph and Typsettiong Workshop, 21st Century COE Program "East Asian Center for Informatics in Humanities—Toward an Overall Inheritance and Development of Kanji Culture—", 44–51, 2004年
- Hoshi, Izumi. チベット : チベット語 / Chibetto: Chibetto go. (Tibet: Tibetan) Joho Senta Shuppankyoku, 2005.
- (2005) チベット語の接辞-ñän（-mkhan）の文法化—専門家から人へ、人から属性へ--, 『アジア・アフリカ文法研究』 共同研究プロジェクト「音韻に関する通言語的研究」, 33巻, 115–138.
- (2007) チベット語ラサ方言の接続関係を表すcääについて—動詞から転成した助詞—, 日本西蔵学会々報, 53号, 73–87.
- Iwao, Kazushi, Nathan W. Hill, Tsuguhito Takeuchi, Izumi Hoshi, and Yoshiro Imaeda. Old Tibetan Inscriptions. Tokyo: Research Institute for Languages and Cultures of Asia and Africa, Tokyo University of Foreign Studies, 2009.
- (2010) チベット語ラサ方言の格標示形式の体系, チベット=ビルマ系言語の文法現象 1：格とその周辺.
- (2010) 14 世紀チベット語文献『王統明示鏡』における存在動詞. [Existential verbs in the Rgyal rabs gsal ba'i me long, a 14th-century Tibetan narrative]. 東京大学言語学論集 (Tokyo University Linguistic Papers) 29.3: 29–68.
- (2012) "The flow of Eastern Tibetan colloquial ^e into Middle Tibetan". Historical Development of the Tibetan Languages. Tsuguhito Takeuchi and Norihiko Hayashi, eds. Kobe: Research Institute of Foreign Studies, Kobe University of Foreign Studies. 71–86.
- (2012) 静かなる闘い---熱を帯びるチベットの映画制作の現場から, FIELD+, 8号, 26–29.
- (2013). The Flow of Eastern Tibetan Colloquial ˆe into Middle Tibetan, Journal of Research Institute Vol. 49 Historical Development of the Tibetan Languages, 49号, 71–83, 2013年
- (2013). チベット語ラサ方言の文のタイプ, チベット=ビルマ系言語の文法現象2：述語と発話行為のタイプからみた文の下位分類, 455–476.
- (2013). 中世チベット語の文のタイプ, チベット=ビルマ系言語の文法現象2：述語と発話行為のタイプからみた文の下位分類, 321–345.
- (2014). 小説家の描く現代チベット: アムド出身の二人の作家, 日本西蔵学会々報, 60号, 135–148.
