= Dariush Ashoori =

Iranian writer

Dariush Ashoori داریوش آشوری
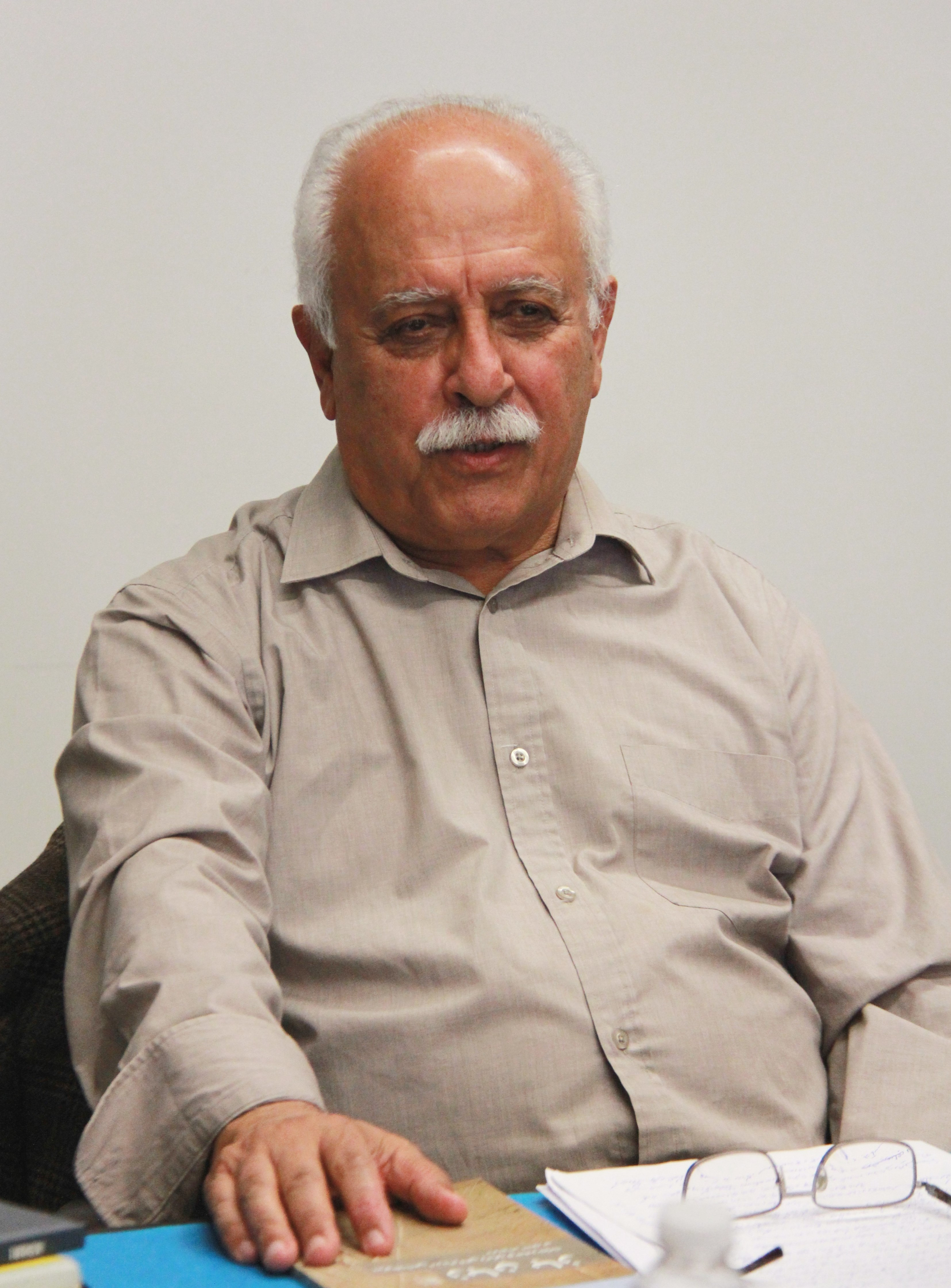
- Dariush Ashoori in New York, 2013
- Born: August 2, 1938 (age 87); Tehran

Daryoush Ashouri (Persian: داریوش آشوری, born August 2, 1938, in Tehran) is a prominent Iranian thinker, author, translator, researcher, and public intellectual. He lives in Paris, France.

== Work ==
He studied at the Faculty of Law, Political Sciences and Economics of the University of Tehran, and has been visiting professor of Persian language and literature at Tokyo University of Foreign Studies. Ashoori taught at the Oriental Institute of the University of Oxford, and lectured on political philosophy and political sociology at the University of Tehran. From 1970 to 1978, Ashoori was a second Academy of Persian Language member.

Ashoori has worked extensively as an author, essayist, translator, literary interpreter, encyclopedist, and lexicologist. His intellectual interests cover a wide interdisciplinary range, including political sciences, literature, philosophy and linguistics. His main domain of intellectual focus is the cultural and linguistic matters of his native country, Iran, as a Third World country encountering modernity.

He has made vast contributions to developing the Persian vocabulary and terminology in human sciences and philosophy by coining new words and modifying existing ones. His works in this domain are compiled in his Farhang-e 'olum-e ensāni (A Dictionary of Human Sciences). Among his major works stands a hermeneutical, an intertextual study of the Divan of Hafez (Erfān o rendi dar she'r-e Hafez) which introduces a new approach to the understanding of the great classical poet. As a translator, he has translated numerous classical literary and philosophical works by Nietzsche, Machiavelli, Shakespeare and others into Persian.

== Publications ==
- Selected Books:
  - Ta’rīf-hā va Mafhūm-e Farhang (Concept and Definitions of Culture)
  - Erfān-o Rendī dar She’r-e Hāfeż
  - Mā va Moderniyat (a collection of articles on the cultural crisis of Iranian society facing with modernity)
  - Farhang-e ‘Olūm-e Ensānī (English-Persian Dictionary for Human Sciences)
  - She’r-o Andisheh (Poetry and Thought)
  - Bāz-andīshi-ye Zabān-e Fārsī (Persian Language, Rethought)
  - Dānesh-nāme-ye Siyāsī (An Encyclopaedia of Politics)
  - Chenīn Goft Zartosht, a translation of the Also Sprach Zarathustra by Friedrich Nietzsche

== Sources ==
- Iran Heritage: The Legacy of the Constitutional Revolution in Iran: A Hundred Years of Struggle For Democracy, Lecture Series by Dariush Ashoori
- Aftab article on Dariush Ahouri

== See also ==
- Intellectual movements in Iran
- Persian philosophy
