= Kitamura Hajime =

Japanese linguist

Kitamura Hajime (北村甫, 1923–2004) was a Japanese linguist who particularly focused on the Lhasa dialect of Tibetan. He published both a grammar and a dictionary of Lhasa Tibetan. He was employed at the Tokyo University of Foreign Studies at the Institute of Languages and Cultures of Asia and Africa.

== Works ==
- Kitamura, Hajime (1960) チベット文字轉寫とチベット語表記
- Kitamura, Hajime (1964). Gendai Chibettogo kōgo nyūmon tekisuto (sōan). Yunesuko Higashi Ajia Bunka Kenkyū Sentā, Tōyō Bunko.
- Kitamura, Hajime (1969) 『五体清文鑑』 のチベット語について: 中間報告
- Kitamura, Hajime (1974). Gendai Chibettogo no hatsuon. (Pronunciation of Modern Tibetan) ILCAA, 1974.
- Kitamura, Hajime (1974). Chibetto moji nyumon. (Introduction to Tibetan Scripts) ILCAA, 1974.
- Kitamura, Hajime (1974). Gendai Chibettogo no kaiwa. (Conversation of Modern Tibetan) ILCAA, 1974
- Kitamura, Hajime (1975). "The Honorifics in Tibetan." Acta Asiatica 29: 56-74.
- Kitamura, Hajime (1975) 現代チベット語の研修について (昭和 49 年度言語研修報告)
- Kitamura, Hajime (1977). Tibetan: Lhasa Dialect. Tokyo: Asia Africa Gengo Bunka Kenkyūjo, Tokyo Gaikokugo Daigaku.
- Kitamura, Hajime (1981) 日本学術振興会言語学訪中団報告
- Kitamura, Hajime (1990). 現代チベット語分類辞典
