= Raees Warsi =

Pakistani writer

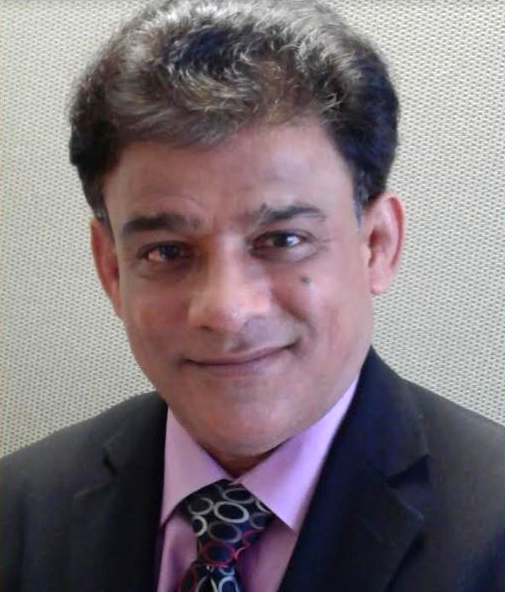
- Born: 1 March 1963 (age 63); Karachi, Sindh, Pakistan
- Education: M.A. (Mass Communication)
- Alma mater: University of Karachi
- Occupations: Urdu poet, Journalist, TV Anchor
- Writing career
- Genre: Ghazal / Nazm
- Notable awards: Lifetime Achievement Award by the US President Mr. Joseph R. Biden Jr., in (2024); Pride of Pakistan by Ministry of Overseas Pakistanis, Govt: of Pakistan (2017)

Raees Warsi (Urdu: رئیس وارثی; born 1 March 1963) is a Pakistani-American Urdu poet, journalist, lyricist, television anchor and social worker. He is the founder and president of Urdu Markaz New York, an organisation established in 1989 to promote the Urdu language and literature. Warsi is the author of the poetry collection Aaina Hoon Main and has written lyrics for Pakistani and Indian musical productions.

== Family and childhood ==
Warsi was born in Karachi, Pakistan. He studied at the University of Karachi, where he earned a master's degree in mass communication in 1987. During his student years, he began writing articles for newspapers and magazines while also composing Urdu poetry. He later emigrated to the United States, where he lives with his wife, Tabassum Pervaiz.

== Poetry and services ==
Warsi started composing poetry at an early age. Warsi gained national attention courtesy his popular Ghazal recited in a national poetry session in Karachi in 1981. Warsi became a regular contributor to Mushaira (traditional poetry gatherings). In published works, his first real breakthrough came when one of his poems was published in the literary magazine Afkaar in Karachi (1986). He then became a regular contributor to newspapers and literary magazines, including the most widely circulated Urdu-language newspaper, the Daily Jang. Other newspapers and magazines that featured his poetry and prose were the Daily Hurriyat, Daily Mashriq, Daily Nawa-i-Waqt, the weekly Akhbar e Jahan, weekly Akhbar e Khawateen, the monthly Wirsa, monthly Idraak and numerous others. He was interviewed both in Pakistani and Indian newspapers and magazines as well as on radio and television for his literary contributions. He was listed as a prominent poet in the Directory of Pakistani Writers Published by the, Pakistan Academy of Letters (1994 Edition), A-8 Pitrus Bukhari Road, Islamabad 44000. In 1989, Warsi moved to the United States. He channeled his literary efforts into establishing the Urdu Markaz New York (Urdu Language Center) in 1989. Under its auspices, biweekly sessions of reciting poetry and prose, lecture series and critical sessions were organised. In New York as well, Warsi has been a regular contributor of poetry; he has been the president of the society since its inception. The high point of the Urdu Language Center was organizing the First International Urdu Conference, was held at the UNO's headquarters, on 24 June 2000. This conference was attended by many living Urdu luminaries: poets, novelists, humorists and critics from across the globe. The conference was lauded by the UN secretary general, the vice president of the United States and the presidents of Pakistan and India. The Asia Society of New York printed his Urdu poetry with English translation, along with an introductory paragraph on his poetry and life, in 2003, 2009 and 2011 brochures[10]Voice of America TV (The US government's official external radio and television broadcasting service) interviewed him, and made a special documentary titled Future of Urdu Language in the United States of America on the occasion of the inauguration ceremony of his book (the first collection of his poetry), in Virginia, 2006.[11] He named it Aaina Hoon Main (I Am the Mirror). The book has introductory remarks from Gopi Chand Narang (President Sahitya Akademi / National Academy of Letters India, 2003–2007) Farman Fatehpuri (former president of the Urdu Dictionary Board), Iftikhar Arif (president Muqtadra Quami Zaban / former president Pakistan Academy of Letters), Ahmed Faraz (former president National Book Foundation of Pakistan), Ahmad Nadeem Qasmi (editor Funoon Magazine & Active member of Progressive Writers Movement), Zameer Jaffary and Jameel Jalibi (former vice chancellor of University of Karachi), Dr. Saeed Warsi and Humaira Rahman.

== Television and radio ==
Raees Warsi participated in several radio programs on Radio Pakistan ( Pakistan Broadcasting Corporation ) Karachi station from 1979 to 1984, produced by senior producers Zameer Ali and Shehnaz Saleem. His lyrics were broadcast on PTV ( Pakistan Television Corporation / State-run broadcaster ) on different occasions. He Anchored the broadcast news and co-produced Urdu-language television programs in New York and New Jersey since 1995.

- ITV (International Television New York) Channel 77, Newscaster "Jeevay Pakistan" 1995 to 1997.
- ETN (Eastern Television Network New York / New Jersey), Co-producer, 2000 to 2003
- PTN (Pakistan Television Network), Newscaster / Host/ Anchor of "Today's Guest" on Channel 509, March 2003 to July 2006
- AAJ TV Host/Anchor of Mehfil-e-Mosalma and Natia Mushairah on Dish Network Channel 684, USA.

== Author and editor ==
- Author of "Aaina Hoon Main" was published by Urdu Markaz New York (Institute of Urdu Language NYC) in 2005
- Second edition was published in 2008.
- Column has been published on the editorial page of Daily Jang and Jang magazines, also in Daily Nawa-i-Waqt, Daily Huriyat Daily Mashriq and others.
- News editor of PTN (Pakistan Television Network NY/NJ), from 2005 to 2007.
- Editor of Govt boys secondary school's magazine Mashal-e-Raah (Wall Paper).
- Editor of Govt Superior Science College Karachi's magazine The Pierian from 1979 to 1980
- Chief editor and magazine secretary of Govt Superior Science College Karachi's magazine The Pierian from 1981 to 1982.
- Member editorial board of monthly magazine Virsa, Karachi, Pakistan-1987-88
- Member editorial board of monthly magazine Awaz, New York
- Chief editor first international Urdu magazine Warsa New York. ISBN 978-1-63684-956-0

== MPhil on his services ==
In 2024, an MPhil thesis titled The Literary Dimensions of Raees Warsi: A Research and Critical Study was completed at the Government College Women University Faisalabad (GCWUF). The thesis was written by Atiya Sarfraz under the supervision of Professor Dr. Sadaf Naqvi and examines Warsi's poetry, literary works, and contributions to Urdu literature.

== United Nations Urdu translation initiative ==
In July 2025, the United Nations expanded its multilingual translation initiative to include 27 additional languages, including Urdu. During a ceremony at the United Nations Headquarters, Pakistan's Representative to the United Nations, Usman Jadoon, and Raees Warsi presented translated UN documents to the president of the United Nations General Assembly. According to the report, the initiative makes UN documents available in the native languages of approximately 3.5 billion people.

== Filmography, lyrics and albums ==
Although Warsi was born and raised in Pakistan, his poetry was well received in India as well. He was invited to write songs for the Bollywood movie Hum Tum Aur Mom, released in 2005, directed and produced by Ashok Nanda. His songs for this movie were performed by Bollywood singers Udit Narayan and Sadhna Sargam. In September 2002, an album of Warsi's ghazals titled Beetay Lamhay was released (by Naeem Hashmi of Pak-US Music Lovers, Producer Khalid Abbas Dar, Music Director Aslam Meenu, Production Director Furqan Haider), sung by leading Pakistani classical singers Ustad Zakir Ali Khan, Raees Warsi's Ghazals, Ghulam Ali Asad Amanat Ali Khan, Pervaiz Mehdi, Hamid Ali Khan, Asif Ali, Rifaqat Ali Khan, Shamsa Kanwal, Iqbal Qasim, Feroz Akhtar, Rashid Khan, Sabir Ali and Zafar Iqbal among others. Another CD album of Warsi's Naatia (Na`at) and Hamdia (Hamd) Kalam / poetry titled Madinee Chaloo was released in February 2010 by Humza Studio (New York), sung by Pakistani film singer and Naat Khawan Farooq Shad. On Kashmir Day (5 February 2011), his new song titled "Tarana-e-Kashmir" was telecast on PTV Global (State-run broadcast of Pakistan), sung by Zaffar Iqbal, Music Director Nasir Hussain (Lahore). The album "Dil Ki Awaz" Vol:06 (Tribute to Poets of New Era Including Ahmed Faraz, Saleem Kousar, Wasi Shah, Raees Warsi, Abbas Tabish, Khalid Moin and others) by Zafar Iqbal, was released in July 2011. His new CD album "Mohabbat Ke Naam" was released in September 2012. His new national song "Mera dil hay merey jan Pakistan Pakistan" sung by Zafar Iqbal, with music by Waeem Abbas, was released on Pakistan's 67th independence day, 14 August 2014, and was telecast on Express News.

== Awards and recognition ==
- US President's Lifetime Achievement Award Medal.
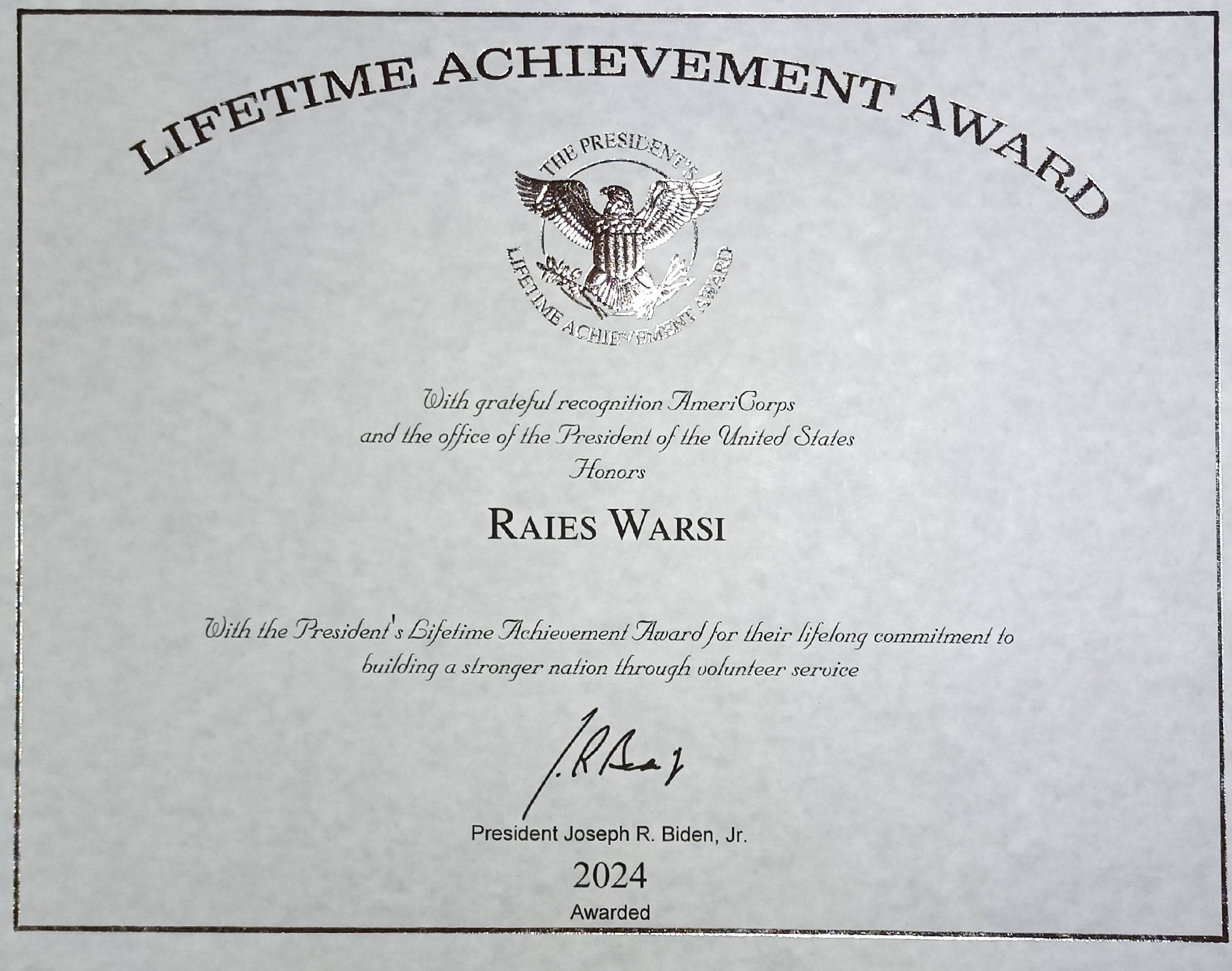
- Lifetime Achievement Award by US president Mr. Joseph R. Biden Jr. in 2024.
- Mr. Tony Avella, New York State Senator presented State Proclamation honoring Raees Warsi for his leadership and service to the Pakistani American Community in November 2018
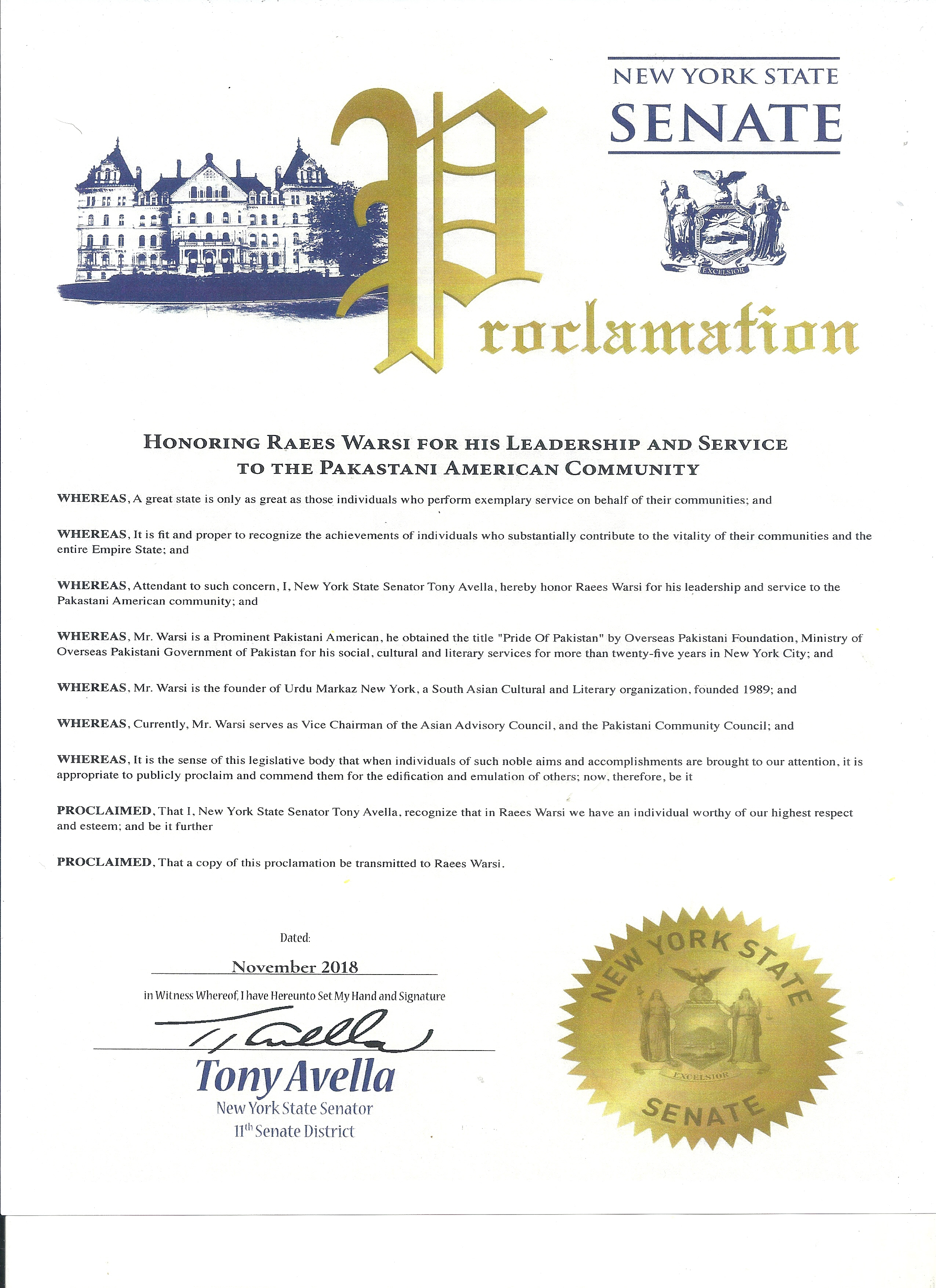
- Raees Warsi was awarded Pride of Pakistan by Overseas Pakistani Foundation, Ministry of Overseas Pakistanis & Human Resource Development, Government of Pakistan
- Raees Warsi was recognized and awarded the Citation for his contributions & Outstanding Services for more than twenty five years to promote Urdu Literature in The United States, From Brooklyn Borough President Mr. Eric L. Adams, On 29 May 2015.
- Service Award in recognition for 10 years of dedicated service from Bellevue Hospital Center, New York City Health
- Hospital Corporation on 10 June 2014.
- Award for best poetry & services to promote Urdu language from Urdu Literary Society of Philadelphia PA, on 27 April 2014.
- Certificate of Recognition for Community and Poetry Services, from the Administration of Hempstead Town, Nassau County, New York State, USA. Presented by Kate Murray (Head of The Local Government), on 24 Sep 2011.
- He Received a letter of appreciation from Honorable Chaudhry Pervaiz Elahi Deputy Prime Minister of Pakistan / Ex-Chief Minister of Punjab, No:PH/429201371, June 2006.
- Raees Warsi was awarded the best performance in Urdu Cultural Diplomacy Aawrad by International Council of Arts, Canada, Nov 2025
- Services for Urdu language Award, From Zafar Zaidi Society, New York, November 2008.
- Mr. Warsi received a letter of appreciation from Honorable Shaukat Aziz the prime minister of Pakistan, Letter No. F.1(40)SW/PM/2006, Prime Minister's Secretariat (Public), Islamabad, Pakistan, Dated 19 June 2006.
- Best Book of the year 2005/Award, From Funrama Entertainment Inc, Dallas, July 2006.;
- Community Services Award, Presented by Weekly Pakistan News, New York, August 2002.
- Literary and Community Services Award, From Pakistan Television, New York, June 2000.
- Urdu Services Appreciation Award, From Weekly Awam May 2000.
- Community Services Award, From Pak Asia Magazine, New York, July 1999.
- Literary Services Award, Presented by Karachi University Alumni of USA, June 1998.
- Golden Jubilee Award for literary services, From Eastern Communication Network, Washington DC, April 1997.

== Warsi's famous poetry (Ghazals) ==
S.No	Poetry (Ghazal)	Singer	URL
1	Usay Bhula ke bhi yadoun ke silsilay na gae	Ustad Zakir Ali Khan	https://soundcloud.com/raees-warsi/ustad-zakir-ali-khan
2	Arz-e-Gham se bhi faida tou nahain	Ghulam Ali	https://soundcloud.com/raees-warsi/ghulam-ali-1
3	Hadaf-e-Gham na kia sang-emalamat ne mujhay	Ghulam Ali	https://soundcloud.com/raees-warsi/ghulam-ali-2
4	Main ek kanch ka paikar woh shakhs pathat tha	Hamid Ali Khan	https://soundcloud.com/raees-warsi/hamid-ali-khan-1
5	Ab Kaise Pazirai ho aashufta saron ki	Hamid Ali Khan	https://www.musicjinni.com/4A469-0pQk1/Hamid-Ali-Khan-best-ghazal-written-by-Raees-Warsi.html
6	Ek lamhae wisal tha wapas na aa saka	Asad Amanat Ali Khan	https://soundcloud.com/raees-warsi/asad-amanat-ali
7	Youn bhi tou raas roh ko tanhai aa gaee	Asad Amanat Ali Khan	https://soundcloud.com/raees-warsi/asad-amanat-ali-khan
8	Beetay Lamhay sundar yadain kab tak dil behlaou gay	Pervaiz Mehdi	https://soundcloud.com/raees-warsi/parvaiz-mehdi
9	Tarz-e-Fikro nazar nahian aaya	Humaira Channa	https://soundcloud.com/raees-warsi/humaira-channa
10	Takhti na koee ghar pe raees apnay lagaou	Shamsa Kanwal	https://soundcloud.com/raees-warsi/shamsa-kanwal
11	Ek ladki meri zindagi ban gaee	Udit Narayin & Sadhna Sargam	http://www.hindigeetmala.net/song/ek_ladki_meri_jindagi_ban_gayi.htm
12	Ek lamha-e-Wisal tha wapas na aa saka	Asif Ali	https://www.musicjinni.com/i68--dYfg7J/Raees-Warsi-s-Ghazal-by-Asif-Ali.html
13	Usay bhula ke bhi yadon ke silsilay na gae	Rafaqat Ali Khan	http://bazarlove.website/watch/8-VEgdlRIHM
14	Teray paiker se koee morat bana li jaye gi	Zafar Iqbal	https://soundcloud.com/raees-warsi/zafar-iqbal-new-yorker

== See also ==
- List of Pakistani writers
- List of Urdu language poets
- List of Pakistani poets
- List of Urdu language writers
- Urdu poets
- List of Pakistanis
- List of Pakistani Americans
- List of University of Karachi alumni
