= Muhammad Ahmed Qadri =

Pakistani-born political scientist

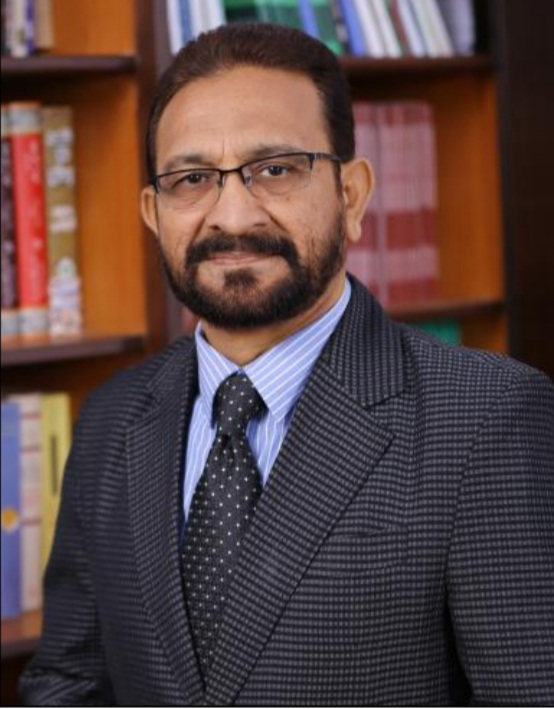
- Religious Scholar & Political Scientist
- Born: December 25, 1958 (age 67); Khipro, Sindh Pakistan
- Era: Modern era

Muhammad Ahmed Qadri (born 25 December 1958) is a Pakistani political scientist having served as the Dean Faculty of Arts and Social Sciences and Dean Faculty of Islamic Studies at the University of Karachi in Pakistan. Qadri is a former Vice Chancellor of Nazeer Hussain University in Karachi. He is an educator, political scientist, founder of Islamic Educational and Cultural Research Center North America and has authored several books about Islam in the contemporary world.

== Biography ==
=== Early life ===
Muhammad Ahmed Qadri was born in Khipro, Sindh, Pakistan in 1958 to Shaykh Badshah Mian Qadri and Bibi Maqboolun Nisa Qadriya. He is from tribe of Banu Hashim. His parents were settled in Hyderabad, Deccan, India and then proceeded from Ajmer to Pakistan after both of them had the same dream to migrate to Pakistan as instructed by Khwaja Ghareeb Nawaz Moinuddin Chishti. Muhammad Ahmed Qadri has an older brother: Hafiz Muhammad Abdullah Qadri, former chairman, Department of Political Science, University of Karachi, Pakistan and the first blind PhD scholar in Pakistan. After crossing over into Pakistan and staying in the bordering town of Khipro, where Mohammad Ahmed Qadri was born, the family settled in Karachi. Shaykh Badshah Mian Qadri would teach Qur’an to children never accepting or seeking any recompense for his efforts. Rather, he started his small business making toys and little things for children, the proceeds from which he would spend mostly on educating his children. His sons would receive a traditional Islamic education directly from him.

=== Education ===
Muhammad Ahmed Qadri is a graduate of the Dars-e-Nizami, with an advanced religious studies curriculum . He also has a Bachelors in Law, Masters in Islamic Studies / Arabic, and M.A., M.Phil. and Ph.D. in political science from the University of Karachi, Pakistan.

=== Career ===
Muhammad Ahmed Qadri is a full professor and research advisor having taught at the University of Karachi for 30 years, where he also served as Dean of the Faculty of Arts and Social Sciences and Dean of the Faculty of Islamic Studies. Qadri is the former Vice Chancellor of Nazeer Hussain University. He was engaged in a project in China in 2018 as part of the CPEC.

=== Community service ===
Qadri is also the founding director of the Islamic Educational and Cultural Research Center (IECRC), a non-political, non-profit organization founded in 2002 with centers in the US, Canada, Pakistan and Bahrain. He is frequently invited as keynote speaker to conferences around the world. He has to date visited the United States, Canada, New Zealand, Portugal, Bahrain, Oman and the United Arab Emirates speaking on topics related to social ethics, Islam (including Sufism) and the contemporary challenges, world politics, terrorism, and the political economy.

Qadri is also a regular speaker on Pakistan television channels.

=== Published books ===
- 2020 - Western Perceptions of Islam and Global Terrorism
- 2008 - World Peace Order: Towards an International State
- Ramadan: The Month of Patience, Empathy, and Self-Purification
- Visiting the Holy City of Madinah, the Radiant
- Quranic Therapy: Heal Yourself Part 1
- Quranic Therapy: Heal Yourself Part 2
- The Muslim World: Hope in the New Millennium
- The Science of Dreams
- Peace and Tolerance in Islam
- Reviving Love for the Holy Prophet Muhammad (PBUH)
- Blessings on the Prophet Muhammad (PBUH)
- Islamic Public Administration: Theory and Practice
- Pakistan Siyasat mein Ulema Ka Kirdaar / The Role of Religio-Political Elite in Pakistan: 1947–1977

=== Honours, decorations, awards and distinctions ===
Qadri is the recipient of:

- The Ambassador for Peace Award presented by the Universal Peace Federation, and the Interreligious and International Federation for World Peace in Canada
- The National Education Award presented by the Pakistan Education Forum, and
- The Award for Research in Social Sciences presented in Dubai
