= A. C. Matin =

Pakistani-American microbiologist and immunologist

- Born: 1941; Delhi, India
- Died: April 14, 2024 (aged 82–83); Stanford, CA
- Occupations: Microbiologist, immunologist, and academician
- Awards: Elected fellow, American Academy of Microbiology; Elected Associate Fellow, Aerospace Medical Association; Recipient of NASA honor award for the ECAMSAT Project; Review Committee of the Accreditation Board for Engineering and Technology (ABET)

Academic background
- Education: B.S., microbiology M.S., microbiology Ph.D., microbiology University of Karachi, Pakistan; University of California, Los Angeles

Academic work
- Institutions: Stanford University School of Medicine

A. C. Matin was a Pakistani-American microbiologist, immunologist, academician and researcher. He was a professor of microbiology and immunology at Stanford University School of Medicine.

Matin published over 100 research papers plus several reviews and has many patents registered in his name. His research was focused on bio-molecular engineering, cellular resistance and virulence, drug discovery, biology of microgravity, bioremediation, stress promoters, stress sensing, and biotechnology. He made pioneering research contributions in biology and physiology of mixotrophy, starvation responses at the cellular and genetic levels, bacterial multidrug and biofilm resistance, role of G proteins in starvation and motility, discovery of an imageable cancer prodrug, specific drug targeting and the development of heritable contrast agent for molecular resonance imaging. Matin's work on antibiotic resistance along with his work as a principal investigator on E. coli AntiMicrobial Satellite (EcAMSat) system resulted in NASA sending E. coli to space for astronaut health protection in 2017. He was the recipient of NASA honor award for the ECAMSAT Project.

Matin was the editor-in-chief of Open Access Journal of Applied Sciences.

== Education ==
Matin studied microbiology at University of Karachi and received his bachelor's and master's degrees in 1960 and 1962, respectively, followed by college-level teaching for two years. He was awarded a Fulbright Fellowship, moved to the US and earned his Ph.D. in microbiology from University of California, Los Angeles in 1969. He completed his postdoctoral research from University of California in 1971.

== Career ==
Following his postdoctoral studies, Matin joined University of Groningen in the Netherlands as a first class scientific officer from 1971 till 1975 before moving back to the US and being appointed by Stanford University. He is a professor in Department of Microbiology and Immunology and is associated with Cancer Institute, Program in Genetic and Molecular Medicine, Woods Environmental Institute, Cardiovascular Institute, Institute for Immunity, and BioX Program at Stanford University. From 1989 till 1998 (when the program ended), he served as a professor at Western Region Hazardous Substance Research Center at the university.

== Research ==
Matin's work was focused on various microbiology and biotechnology related topics including antibiotic resistance, cancer research, bio-molecular engineering, biofilms, cellular resistance and virulence, biology of microgravity, bioremediation, stress promoters, stress sensing, and systems biology. His work in bioenergetics provided fundamental insights into how acidophilic bacteria, which grow at a pH of 3 or lower, keep a neutral cytoplasm.

=== Enzyme improvement and targeted therapy for cancer research ===
Matin discovered a new gene delivered enzyme prodrug therapy consisting of CNOB, and the enzyme ChrR which activates the CNOB. He then improved and humanized the enzyme to HChrR6 by using non structure-based approaches like DNA shuffling; a novel statistical method for protein improvement, as well as analyzing HChrR structure.

Matin found that the activated toxic product of CNOB, MCHB, is highly fluorescent and used this discovery for the development of a method using mRNA for targeting the HChrR6 gene specifically to cancer. He generated exosomes loaded with the HChrR6 mRNA that displayed high affinity anti-HER2 scFv, and named them EXODEPTs; the EXODEPTs specifically targeted the HER2 receptor and delivered the HChrR6 mRNA only to HER2-positive cells. Matin applied systemic EXODEPT injection along with CNOB or tretazicar (CB1954), and found complete growth arrest of orthotopic HER2 positive breast cancer xenografts in mice without injuring other tissues or organs, indicating no off-target prodrug activation. This work was highlighted in Science Translational Medicine. He was the pioneer in using exosomes to deliver exogenous mRNA. Matin also showed that magnetotactic bacteria can specifically target tumors in mice and generate both positive and negative magnetic resonance imaging signals, and thus provide a potential tool for improved MRI visualization; this was the first use of these bacteria for this purpose.

=== Bacterial hunger response ===
Matin studied the effect of nutrient deprivation in bacteria, which is often experienced by them in the human body and the environment, and worked on induction of two classes of starvation genes named as cyclic AMP-dependent and independent. He studied the comprehensive resistant state of the bacteria. For example, hunger stress made bacteria more resistant not only to nutrient deprivation but also to oxidative stress, a major resistance mechanism in humans against pathogenic bacteria, as well as to heat and osmotic stresses.

Matin pioneered the discovery that this comprehensive resistance was due to cAMP-independent class of proteins, called the Pex proteins, further he showed that the Pex protein synthesis was controlled by σs (formerly called KatF) and that this sigma factor thereby controlled development of the general stress response. Hunger stress was found to trigger the expression of virulence proteins in bacteria enhancing their pathogenic prowess.

Matin's work was instrumental in the discovery of σs and its regulation. His research also resulted in the first identification of the physiological role for ClpXP protease, and showed that σs is rapidly degraded in fast growing cells by this protease; the site in the σs protein targeted by this protease was also identified.

Matin used bioreactors to generate simulated microgravity (SMG) on Earth, and showed that uropathogenic Escherichia coli (UPEC) developed σs-dependent comprehensive resistance under SMG, indicating that microgravity constitutes a stress. He also studied protein folding and overproduced DnaK in an E. coil strain making the human growth hormone (HGH). His experiment resulted in much greater amount of normal and soluble HGH.

=== Antibiotic resistance ===
Matin conducted research on the bacterial antibiotic resistance along with the threat of multidrug resistance (MDR) pumps in public health. His work indicated the regulation of the MDR pump by emrRAB operon and the EmrR protein. He found that the antibiotics alter the EmrR and prevent its binding to the promoter which leads to the synthesis of the pump and MDR. He also showed that EmrR induces of the mcb operon protecting bacteria against additional antibiotics (e.g., fluoroquinolones).

Matin discovered the mechanism of bactericidal antibiotics for generating oxidative stress. His research indicated that suppressing UPEC antioxidant defense can bolster gentamicin (Gm) effectiveness In treating cystitis. He also studied the effects of σs-mediated enhanced resistance and SMG. Based on these studies, Matin in collaboration with NASA, designed a payload system for testing the effect of space microgravity on UPEC Gm resistance and confirmed that silencing of σs will make Gm more effective against bacterial infections also in space flight, providing the means of increasing Gm effectiveness both on Earth and space.

Matin focused on bacterial biofilms as a challenge in disease treatment. He used his discovery that E. coli strains fluoresce upon tetracycline treatment to test if biofilm penetration barrier accounted for their enhanced resistance. Tetracycline caused cells to fluoresce throughout the biofilms indicating no role for the penetration barrier. However, a UPEC mutant missing the rapA gene, generated by Matin, showed that impaired penetration had a role in biofilm resistance to penicillin, norfloxacin, chloramphenicol, and Gm, and that, in addition, the yhcQ gene, which encoded a putative MDR pump was also involved. That biofilm resistance differ for different antibiotics and different bacteria is now widely accepted.

=== Molecular bioremediation ===
Matin also studied bacterial bioremediation of the carcinogens chromate Cr(VI) and uranyl U(VI), which are widespread environmental pollutants, especially in the Department of Energy waste sites, and worked on their bioremediation to the insoluble and nontoxic Cr(III) and U(IV). He studied various consequences after the bacterial exposure to chromate and uranyl, and found that the post-exposure effects resulted in one electron reduction of these carcinogens, generating the radicals Cr and U(V) by flavoproteins with various essential metabolic functions. These radicals interacted with oxygen, and generated large quantities of ROS by redox cycling, poisoning the bacteria.

Matin discovered a new class of enzymes, such as ChrR of E. coli, which are obligatory two-/four-electron reducers; these pre-empted the generation of the radicals. He then improved these enzymes and engineered bacteria more effective in remediating these carcinogens. He also studied the physiological role of ChrR, which is to convert quinones to hydroxyquinones in one step, thus preventing the formation of semiquinones, which also redox cycle. In addition, this enzyme prevents redox cycling of numerous compounds generated during metabolism within the bacteria, and those present in the environment that have the proclivity for one-electron reduction.

== Awards and honors ==
- 1964-1971 - Fulbright Fellowship
- 1991, 1995 - Star Award, Environmental Protection Agency
- 1991-1993 - ASM Foundation for Microbiology Lecturer
- 1995 - Elected Fellow, American Academy of Microbiology
- 2011 - Elected Associate Fellow, American Aerospace Medical Association
- Honorary Editorial Board Member, London Journals Press
- 1992-1994 - Review Committee of the Accreditation Board for Engineering and Technology (ABET)

== Bibliography ==
- Matin AC, Forterre A. 2022. Medical use of mRNA-based gene delivery. In RNA TECHNOLOGIES, Springer Series, Volume 13 (2022), Messenger RNA Therapeutics, Stefan Jurga and Jan Barciszewski, Editors. pp. 93-112
- Alexis V. Forterre, Jing-Hung Wang, Alain Delcayre, Kyuri Kim, Carol Green, Mark D. Pegram, Stefanie S. Jeffrey, A. C. Matin. EV-mediated in vitro transcribed mRNA-based gene delivery for targeted treatment of HER2+ breast cancer xenografts in mice by CB1954 without general toxicity. Molecular Cancer Therapeutics, Published Online, January 15, 2020; DOI: 10.1158/1535-7163.MCT-19-0928
- Michael R. Padgen, Matthew P. Lera, Macarena P. Parra, Antonio J. Ricco, Matthew Chin, Tori N. Chinn, Aaron Cohen, Charlie R. Friedericks, Michael B. Henschke, Timothy V. Snyder, Stevan M. Spremo, Jing-Hung Wang, AC Matin. EcAMSat spaceflight measurements of the role of σS in antibiotic resistance of stationary phase Escherichia coli in microgravity. Life Sciences in Space Research 24 (2020) 18-24
- Kanada, M., Bachmann, M. H., Hardy, J. W., Frimannson, D. O., Bronsart, L., Wang, A., Matin, A. C. ... & Contag, C. H. (2015). Differential fates of biomolecules delivered to target cells via extracellular vesicles. Proceedings of the National Academy of Sciences, 112(12), E1433-E1442.
- Wang, J. H., Singh, R., Benoit, M., Keyhan, M., Sylvester, M., Hsieh, M., ... & Matin, A. C. (2014). Sigma S-dependent antioxidant defense protects stationary-phase Escherichia coli against the bactericidal antibiotic gentamicin. Antimicrobial agents and chemotherapy, 58(10), 5964-5975.
- Zhang H., Cohen A.L., Krishnakumar S., Wapnir I.L., Veeriah S., Deng G., Coram M.A., Piskun C.M., Longacre T.A., Herrler M., Frimannsson D.O., Telli M.L., Dirbas F.M., Matin A.C. ... & Jeffrey S.S. 2014. Patient-derived xenografts of triple-negative breast cancer reproduce molecular features of patient tumors and respond to mTOR inhibition. Breast Cancer Res. 2014 Apr 7;16(2)
- Gonzalez, C.F., D.F. Ackerley, S.V. Lynch, and A. Matin. 2005. ChrR, a soluble quinone reductase of Pseudomonas putida that defends against H2O2. The Journal of Biological Chemistry. 280: 22590-22595.
- Schweder, T., K. Lee, O. Lomovskaya, and A. Matin. 1996. Regulation of Escherichia coli starvation sigma factor (σ^{s}) by ClpXP protease. Journal of Bacteriology 178: 470-476.
- Schultz, J., and A. Matin. 1991. Molecular and functional characterization of a carbon starvation gene of Escherichia coli. Journal of Molecular Biology, 218:129-140.
- Reeve, C. A., Amy, P. S., & Matin, A. (1984). Role of protein synthesis in the survival of carbon-starved Escherichia coli K-12. Journal of Bacteriology, 160(3), 1041-1046.
