= National Bibliography Number =

Publication identifier system

National Bibliography Number (NBN) is a group of publication identifier systems used for national bibliographies by national libraries in countries such as Germany, Italy, Finland, Norway, The Netherlands and Sweden. There is no global standard for the contents of NBNs; instead, they have a country-specific format. NBNs are typically used for documents which do not have a publisher-assigned identifier such as an ISBN. They can be used to identify media archived in national libraries, such as Ph.D. theses.

A Uniform Resource Name (URN) namespace for NBNs has been assigned, and was described in IETF RFC 3188, later replaced by RFC 8458.

For example, urn:nbn:de:bvb:19-146642 is an NBN assigned in Germany ("de"), associated with Bavaria ("bvb" = Bibliotheksverbund Bayern), library number 19 (University Library Munich). The NBN refers to a PhD thesis on heat detection in cattle.

Some libraries, such as the National Library of Sweden, provide a resolution service for these URNs.

In Italy an NBN (NBN:IT) is assigned to digital resources deposited in the National Legal Deposit service. The NBN:IT resolver is active.

In The Netherlands the NBN (URN:NBN:NL) is assigned by the National Library (KB). The resolution service for the Dutch NBNs is https://persistent-identifier.nl/
