= List of people from Karachi =

This is a list of notable people from the city of Karachi in Pakistan, also known as Karachiites:

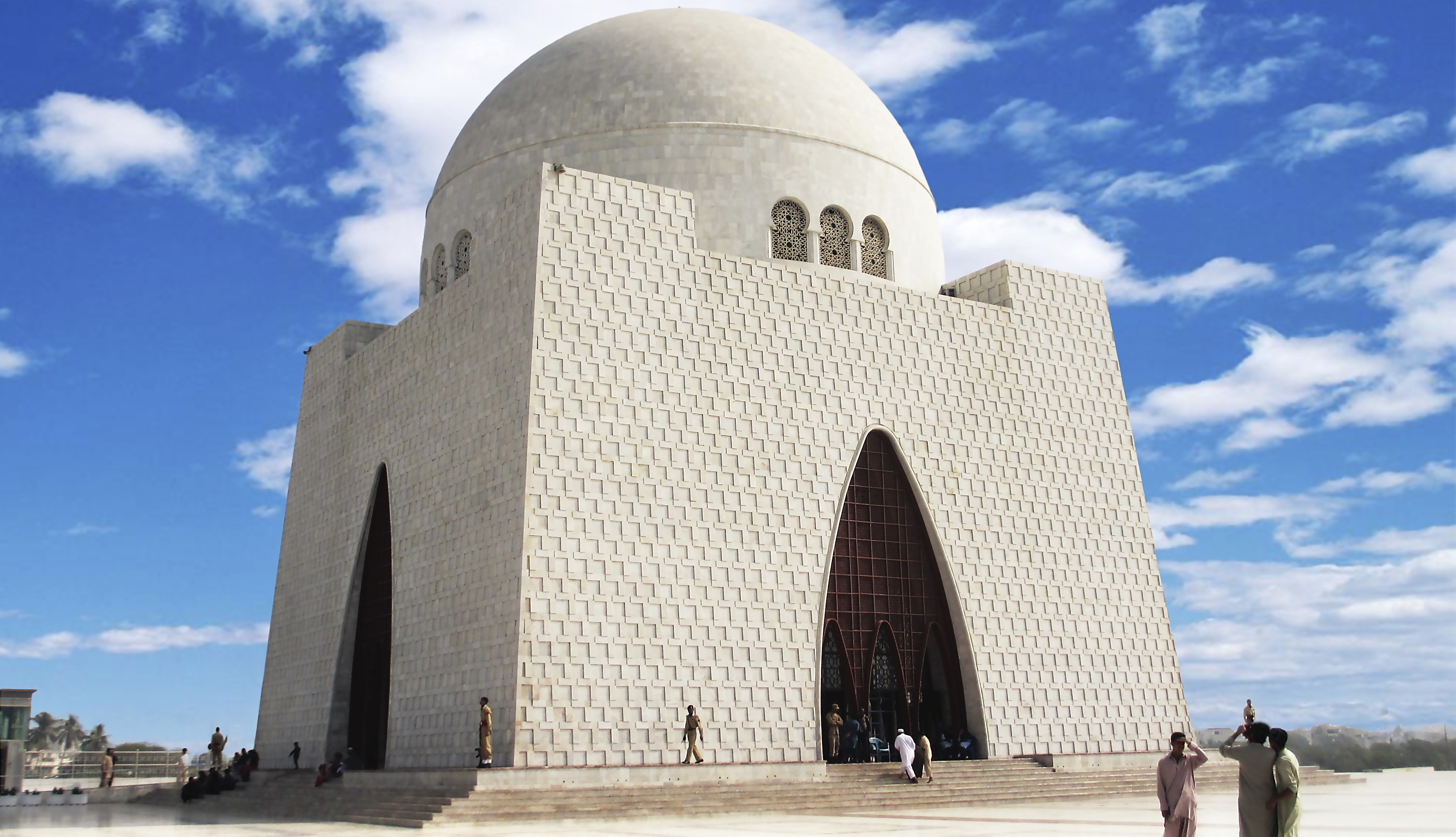
Karachi

== Armed forces ==
- Vice Admiral S. M. Ahsan - governor
- Muhammad Mahmood Alam
- Mirza Aslam Beg - four-star general
- Moinuddin Haider - lieutenant general, governor
- Pervez Musharraf - former president and Army Chief of Pakistan
- Ft. Lt. Rashid Minhas Shaheed - only PAF recipient of Nishan-e-Haider
- Marium Mukhtiar Pakistan's first female martyred fighter pilot in the line of duty.

== Art and literature ==
- Minocher K. Spencer Parsi author and spiritual healer from Karachi (born October 4, 1888, Pune, India)
- Jamiluddin Aali - poet, columnist, critic (born 1926 in Delhi)
- Mohammad Abdul Ahed - architect, educator, painter (1919–2001)
- Manzoor Ahmad - philosopher (born 1934)
- Obaidullah Aleem - journalist, poet (1939–1998)
- Ahmed Ali - novelist, poet, critic, translator, diplomat and scholar (1910 in New Delhi - 1994 in Karachi)
- Nasim Amrohvi - Urdu poet, philosopher, and lexicographer (1908–1987)
- Rais Amrohvi - journalist, poet, psychoanalyst (1914–1988)
- Iftikhar Arif - poet, critic, author (born 1943)
- Hasan Askari - philosopher, author, critic (1919–1978)
- Zamir Ali Badayuni - critic (1941–2003)
- Fatima Surayya Bajia - drama writer (born 1930)
- Tabish Dehlvi - poet (1911–2004)
- Jon Elia - Arsalan Kachaliya's favorite poet, philosopher (1931–2002)
- Aslam Farrukhi - writer, critic, linguist (born 1923)
- Farman Fatehpuri - researcher, poet, critic, linguist (1926–2013)
- Dilawar Figar - humorous poet, scholar (1929 Badaun, UP - 1998 Karachi)
- Zaib-un-Nissa Hamidullah - first female columnist of Pakistan (1921–2000)
- Maulvi Abdul Haq - father of modern Urdu (1872–1961)
- Shan-ul-Haq Haqqee - Urdu poet, writer, journalist, broadcaster, translator, critic, researcher, linguist and lexicographer
- Hameed Haroon - journalist, activist
- Sibte Hassan - author, columnist, activist (1916–1986)
- Zahida Hina - columnist, author, poet (born 1946)
- Ashfaq Hussain - Urdu poet and television personality in Canada for Asian Television Network (born 1951)
- Intizar Hussain - linguist, novelist, critic (born 1923)
- Ibn-e-Insha - poet, writer and humorist (1927 Phillaur, Punjab, British India - 1978 London, England)
- Ibn-e-Safi - novelist, story writer (1928 Nara, district of Allahabad, UP, British India - 1980 Karachi)
- Shaista Suhrawardy Ikramullah - writer, activist (1915–2000)
- Farhat Ishtiaq - writer, author and screenwriter (born June 23, 1980)
- Siddiq Ismail - religious Hamd and Naat reciter (born 1954)
- Qamar Jalalvi - poet (1887 Jalali, Aligarh, India - 1968 Karachi)
- Jameel Jalibi - scholar, critic, linguist, former VC KU (born 1929)
- Abul Khair Kashfi - critic, linguist, author, scholar (1932 Kanpur, British India - 2008 Karachi)
- Khalique Ibrahim Khalique - journalist, poet, critic (1926–2006)
- Ghulam Mustafa Khan - writer, critic, linguist, researcher, scholar, educationist (1912–2005)
- Josh Malihabadi - poet, linguist, scholar (1894–1982)
- Anwar Maqsood - drama writer, anchor, actor (born 1935 Hyderabad State)
- Haseena Moin - playwright, drama writer
- Zehra Nigah - poet
- Pirzada Qasim - poet, author, educationist (born 1943)
- Ishtiaq Hussain Qureshi - author, historian, educationist (1903–1981)
- Fahmida Riaz - writer, poet, activist (born 1946 Meerut, UP, British India)
- Sadequain - painter, calligraphist (1930 Amroha, British India - 1987 Karachi)
- Hakeem Muhammad Said - pioneer of Eastern medicine, philanthropist (1993–1994)
- Abul Lais Siddiqui - critic, linguist, author, scholar
- Shaukat Siddiqui - novelist, fiction writer (1923–2006)
- Raees Warsi - journalist, author, poet, founder of Urdu Markaz New York (born 1963)
- Mushtaq Ahmed Yousfi - author, humorist (born 1923)
- Mustafa Zaidi - poet (1930–1970)
- Rida Bilal - screenwriter, playwright (born 1984)

== Bankers ==
- Agha Hasan Abedi - banker and founder of the now-defunct Bank of Credit and Commerce International
- Shaukat Aziz - former prime minister of Pakistan
- Ishrat Hussain - former Governor State Bank of Pakistan and incumbent Dean of Institute of Business Administration

== Businessmen ==
- Abdul Razzak Yaqoob, Chairman of the ARY Group
- Ahmed Dawood, industrialist, philanthropist and founder of Dawood Group
- Agha Hasan Abedi - banker, founder of BCCI
- Bashir Ali Mohammad, Gul Ahmed Group
- Hussain Haqqani - leading Urdu debater, National College, Karachi; Ambassador of Pakistan to U.S.A.
- Jahangir Siddiqui, owner of JS Group
- Javed Jabbar - orator, politician, Senator
- Malik Riaz - Pakistani business tycoon who is the founder of Bahria Town.
- Monis Rahman - Founder & CEO of Naseeb Networks
- Rafiq M. Habib - Group chairman of the renowned ‘House of Habib’, chairman of Habib Insurance Company Ltd.
- Raza Rabbani - English debater, politician, Senator
- Sadruddin Hashwani - Founder and chairman of Hashoo Group.
- Safi Qureshi - co-founder and CEO of AST Research; born and educated in Karachi; now based in the US
- Sikandar Sultan - managing director of Shan Food Industries

== Debaters and orators ==
- Hussain Haqqani - leading Urdu debater, National College, Karachi; Ambassador of Pakistan to U.S.A.
- Javed Jabbar - orator, politician, Senator
- Raza Rabbani - English debater, politician, Senator

== Economists ==
- Ishrat Hussain - former governor of State Bank of Pakistan
- Akhtar Hameed Khan - pioneer of microcredit and microfinance in Pakistan, founder of Orangi Pilot Project
- Nawab Haider Naqvi - former director, PIDE
- Anwar Shaikh - Marxist economist, and professor
- Muhammad Shoaib - finance minister; executive director of World Bank; father of Nafisa Sadik

== Education ==
- Anita Ghulam Ali - educationist
- Nasim Amrohvi
- Moinuddin Aqeel - author, critic, linguist, scholar
- Bernadette Louise Dean - former Principal of Kinnaird College, Lahore
- Mary Emily - recipient of the Sitara-e-Imtiaz for services to education
- Aslam Farrukhi - author, poet, critic, linguist, scholar
- Farman Fatehpuri - real name Syed Dildar Ali; author, critic, linguist, scholar
- Norma Fernandes - former headmistress (Kindergarten/Junior Section) of the Karachi Grammar School
- Khalida Ghous - human rights activist, scholar
- Yolande Henderson - high school teacher
- Jameel Jalibi - linguist, scholar
- Abul Khair Kashfi - author, critic, linguist, scholar
- Matin Ahmed Khan - academic, marketing expert and management educator, dean and director of the Institute of Business Administration
- Ghulam Mustafa Khan - author, critic, linguist, scholar, Sufi
- Anthony Theodore Lobo - founder of many schools
- Ishtiaq Hussain Qureshi - VC Karachi University, author, historian, scholar
- Ata ur Rahman - Chairman HEC, scientist
- Hakim Saeed - VC Hamdard University
- Abul Lais Siddiqui - author, critic, linguist, scholar
- Pirzada Qasim Raza Siddiqui - chancellor, Karachi University
- Raziuddin Siddiqui - physicist, mathematician, scholar
- Shahid Aziz Siddiqi - former federal secretary and vice chancellor of Ziauddin University

== Journalists ==
- Cyril Almeida
- Mujahid Barelvi
- Ardeshir Cowasjee
- Ian Fyfe - sports journalist
- Kamran Khan
- Daniele Mastrogiacomo - Italian journalist born in Karachi
- Arshad Sharif
- Waseem Badami
- Maria Memon
- Shahid Masood

== Law and judiciary ==
- Justice Syed Sajjad Ali Shah - CJS, chief justice of Sindh High Court from Karachi
- Justice Wajihuddin Ahmed - chief justice, Sind High Court; judge, Supreme Court of Pakistan
- Justice Alvin Robert Cornelius
- Mohammad Haleem - former chief justice of Pakistan
- Makhdoom Ali Khan - former attorney general of Pakistan
- Naimatullah Khan - advocate
- Justice Ajmal Mian - former chief justice of Pakistan
- Justice Dorab Patel
- Nazim Hussain Siddiqui - former chief justice of Pakistan
- Justice Haziqul Khairi - former Chief Justice Federal Shariat Court of Pakistan
- Justice Saeeduzzaman Siddiqui - former chief justice of Pakistan
- Justice Rana Bhagwandas - former acting chief justice of Pakistan
- Justice Nasir Aslam Zahid - former chief justice, Sindh High Court; justice, Pakistan Supreme Court of Pakistan
- Khalid Jawed Khan - Attorney General for Pakistan

== Performing arts ==
=== Actors and comedians ===
- Aamina Sheikh - model, actress
- Adeel Hussain - model, actress
- Adnan Jaffar - television, film actor
- Ahad Raza Mir - actor
- Aijaz Aslam - actor
- Aiman Khan - actress
- Aiza Khan - actress, model
- Alizeh Shah - model, actress
- Angela Thorne - English actress
- Anwar Maqsood - drama writer, anchor, actor
- Ather Shah Khan Jaidi Writer comedian
- Ayaz Samoo - comedian, actor
- Azfar Rehman - actor
- Babar Ali - actor
- Behroze Sabzwari - film actor
- Bilal Abbas Khan - actor
- Bushra Ansari - actress, comedian
- Danish Nawaz - actor
- Danish Taimoor - actor
- Fahad Mustafa - actor
- Fawad Khan - actor
- Fatima Effendi - model, actress
- Hina Altaf - actress
- Hina Dilpazeer - actress, TV host, model
- Humayun Saeed - actor, model and producer
- Iman Vellani - Pakistani-Canadian actress and comic book writer
- Iqbal Theba - Pakistani-American television actor
- Iqra Aziz - model, actress
- Izhar Qazi - film and TV actor
- Jamshed Ansari - comedian
- Kaveeta - actress
- Kumail Nanjiani - comedian
- Mashal Khan - actress
- Madiha Imam - model, actress
- Mahira Khan - television, film actor
- Margaret Lockwood - film and stage actress (1916–1990)
- Mawra Hocane - model, actress
- Mehwish Hayat - actress, model
- Minal Khan - actress
- Mohib Mirza - actor
- Moin Akhter - TV, film and stage actor, comedian and host
- Momal Sheikh - actress
- Muneeb Butt - actor
- Nadeem - film actor
- Nadia Hussain - model, actress
- Nirala (real name Muzaffar Hussain) - comedian
- Ramsha Khan - model, actress
- Rauf Lala - comedian, actor
- Sajid Hasan - actor
- Salim Nasir - comedian, actor
- Sami Shah - comedian, writer
- Sana Javed - model, actress
- Sangeeta - actress, filmmaker, director
- Saud Qasmi - actor
- Shehroz Sabzwari - actor
- Somy Ali, actress and activist
- Syed Kamal - film actor
- Syra Yousuf - model, actress
- Talat Hussain - television actor, director
- Umer Sharif - comic actor
- Urwa Hocane - actress
- Yasir Nawaz - actor
- Yumna Zaidi - actress
- Zafar Karachiwala, Indian actor, ancestors from Karachi
- Zainab Qayyum - model, actress, TV host
- Zhalay Sarhadi - model, actress

=== Singers, musicians and directors ===
- Salma Agha - singer
- Alamgir - pop singer
- Sajjad Ali - singer
- Waqar Ali - singer and musician
- Talha Anjum - rapper and singer
- Faraz Anwar - guitarist
- Iqbal Bano - ghazal singer
- Nisar Bazmi - composer
- Munni Begum - singer
- Moti B. Gidwani – Indian filmamker
- Ali Haider - singer
- Umair Haroon - television producer and director
- Mehdi Hassan - ghazal singer
- Nazia Hassan - first female pop singer of Pakistan
- Zohaib Hassan - singer
- Mehreen Jabbar - Pakistani film director
- Ahmed Jahanzeb - singer
- S. B. John - singer
- Faisal Kapadia - singer
- Bilal Maqsood - composer
- Habib Wali Mohammad - singer
- Sohail Rana - composer
- Shehzad Roy - singer
- Ahmed Rushdi - singer
- Ramesh Sippy Indian film director and producer from Karachi
- Syed Ali Raza Usama - Pakistani film and drama director
- Talhah Yunus - rapper
- Lenny Zakatek - English pop and rock star

=== Dancers ===
- Sheema Kermani social activist, theater director and exponent of Bharatnatyam dance

== Philanthropists and social workers ==
- Somy Ali - activist, filmmaker, and former actress and model
- Ansar Burney - human rights activist and founder of the Ansar Burney Trust
- Abdul Sattar Edhi - philanthropist and founder of the Edhi Foundation
- Bilquis Edhi - philanthropist, founder of the Bilquis Edhi Foundation, wife of Abdul Sattar Edhi
- Ruth Lewis - awarded Sitara-i-Imtiaz for managing Darul Sukun, a home for the disabled
- Fatima Lodhi - social worker, founder of Dark is Divine, first anti-colorism campaign from Pakistan
- Fahmida Riaz
- Hakim Said - scholar, philanthropist, former governor of Sindh
- Nafis Sadik - United Nations
- Ramzan Chhipa - philanthropist and founder of the Chhipa Welfare Association

== Politicians and bureaucrats ==
- Ben Habib - British right-wing politician
- Lal Krishna Advani - former Deputy Prime Minister of India and co-founder of the Bharatiya Janata Party in India
- Abdul Sattar Afghani - ex-mayor, Karachi Metropolitan City
- Shaukat Aziz - former prime minister and finance minister of Pakistan
- Benazir Bhutto - former prime minister
- Fakhruddin G. Ebrahim - governor, law minister, attorney general
- Imran Farooq - co-founder of MQM
- Syed Munawar Hasan - former ameer of Jamaat-e-Islami
- Altaf Hussain - founder and chairman of Muttahida Qaumi Movement (MQM)
- Fatima Jinnah - sister of Muhammad Ali Jinnah and Madar-i-Millet
- Muhammad Ali Jinnah - founder of Pakistan
- Syed Mustafa Kamal - former Nazim (mayor) of Karachi
- Ishrat-ul-Ibad Khan - former governor of Sindh
- Naimatullah Khan - former mayor of Karachi city
- Shahryar Khan - former foreign secretary and former chairman of the Cricket Board in Pakistan
- Jamshed Nusserwanjee Mehta - mayor of Karachi
- Pervez Musharraf - general (Retd.), former Army chief, military dictator and president of Pakistan
- Farooq Sattar - parliamentary leader of the MQM
- Ahmad Noorani Siddiqi - leader of the Jamiat Ulema-e-Pakistan; founder of the World Islamic Mission
- Azeem Ahmed Tariq - former chairman of MQM
- Harchandrai Vishandas - former mayor of Karachi (during 1900s)
- Ali Zaidi - Pakistan Tahreek e insaaf
- Asif Ali Zardari - former president of Pakistan
- Bilawal Bhutto Zardari - chairman of Pakistan People's Party
- Ibrahim Ismail Chundrigar sixth Prime Minister of Pakistan, former Pakistani ambassador to Turkey
- Hussain Haroon - permanent representative of Pakistan to the United Nations
- Ghulam Akbar Lasi - Pakistani politician
- Faisal Vawda - Pakistani politician
- Muhammad Zubair Umar - former governor of Sindh
- Imran Ismail - former governor of Sindh
- Murad Ali Shah - Chief Minister of Sindh
- Hafiz Naeem ur Rehman - Pakistani politician
- Saeed Ghani - Pakistani politician
- Khalid Maqbool Siddiqui - Pakistani politician
- Khurrum Sher Zaman - Pakistani politician
- Firdous Shamim Naqvi - Pakistani politician
- Khawaja Izharul Hassan - Pakistani politician
- Faisal Subzwari - Pakistani politician
- Syed Aminul Haque - Pakistani politician
- Chris Van Hollen - U.S. senator for Maryland

== Religious leaders and scholars ==
- Talib Jauhari - religious scholar
- Aga Khan III - Imam Sultan Mohammed Shah - 48th Imam of Shia Imami Ismaili Muslims, President League of Nations, President All India Muslim League and GCSI, GCMG
- Muhammad Ilyas Qadri - founder of Dawat-e-Islami
- Muhammad Muslehuddin Siddiqui
- Godrej Sidhwa A Parsi Zoroastrian priest
- Taqi Usmani - religious scholar
- Rafi Usmani - religious scholar
- Mufti Muhammad Naeem - religious scholar
- Abdullah Shah Ghazi - eighth-century (c. 720) mystic Sufi, whose shrine is located in the Clifton, Karachi

== Scientists ==
- Ziauddin Ahmed - mathematician
- Salimuzzaman Siddiqui - chemist
- Pervez Hoodbhoy - nuclear physicist
- Abdul Qadeer Khan - metallurgist and founder of Pakistan's nuclear programme
- Atta ur Rahman - chemist
- Raziuddin Siddiqui - astrophysicist and mathematician
- Muhammad Ali Shah - orthopaedic surgeon
- M. Shahid Qureshi - astrophysicist and mathematician
- Ahmed Mohiuddin - zoologist
- Muhammad Qudrat-i-Khuda - chemist and writer

== Sportspersons ==
=== Badminton players ===
- Palwasha Bashir
- Mahoor Shahzad

=== Cricketers ===
- Nain Abidi
- Shahid Afridi - world record holder for the fastest ODI century
- Afzaal Ahmed
- Sarfaraz Ahmed
- Tanvir Ahmed
- Tauseef Ahmed
- Mansoor Akhtar
- Manzoor Akhtar
- Fawad Alam
- Anwar Ali
- Basit Ali
- Liaqat Ali
- Saad Ali
- Saeed Anwar
- Atiq-uz-Zaman
- Sikandar Bakht
- Wasim Bari
- Philip Bonham-Carter
- Anil Dalpat - first Hindu to play for the country
- Rusi Dinshaw
- Antao D'Souza
- Mir Hamza
- Shahzaib Hasan
- Afaq Hussain
- Asif Iqbal
- Faisal Iqbal
- Saleem Jaffar
- Jalal-ud-Din - in 1982, took the first hat-trick in an ODI
- Abdul Kadir
- Asim Kamal
- Danish Kaneria - second Hindu to play for the country
- Saleem Karim
- Javeria Khan
- Mohsin Khan
- Moin Khan
- Rashid Khan
- Tabish Khan
- Khalid Latif
- Rashid Latif
- Shahid Mahmood
- Khurram Manzoor
- Wallis Mathias
- Anwar Miandad
- Javed Miandad
- Hanif Mohammad - first Pakistani batsman to score a triple century
- Mushtaq Mohammad
- Shoaib Mohammad
- Asif Mujtaba
- Urooj Mumtaz - former cricketer, commentator, dentist
- Nasim-ul-Ghani
- Naumanullah
- Iqbal Qasim
- Rumman Raees
- Haroon Rasheed
- Hasan Raza
- Rameez Raja Jnr
- Mohammad Sami
- Asad Shafiq
- Owais Shah (born 1978) - English cricketer
- Saud Shakeel
- Saleem Yousuf

=== Footballer ===
- Saddam Hussain
- Hajra Khan - captain of the Pakistan women's national football team

=== Hockey players ===
- Sohail Abbas
- Mansoor Ahmed
- Jack Britto (Olympian)
- Hanif Khan
- Shahid Ali Khan
- Hassan Sardar
- Islahuddin Siddique

=== Sprinters ===
- Naseem Hameed
- John Permal - fastest man in Pakistan

=== Swimmers ===
- Mumtaz Ahmed - Olympian

== Historical personalities ==
- Mai Kolachi - the incumbent name of Karachi is derived from this fisher woman

== Miscellaneous ==
- Bashir Ahmad
- Tazeen Ahmad
- Chaudhry Muhammad Ali
- Jacqueline Maria Dias - professor of nursing
- Jacob Harris, first-class cricketer and sports coach
- Lady Abdullah Haroon
- Agha Hilaly
- Aamir Liaquat Hussain
- Junaid Jamshed
- Siddiq Ismail
- Farahnaz Ispahani
- Shadab Kabir
- Jahangir Khan
- Yousuf Ludhianvi
- Iskander Mirza
- Abdur Rab Nishtar
- Benny Mario Travas
- Kamal Warsi
- Irfan Yusuf

== See also ==
- List of Muhajir people
- List of Pakistanis
- List of people from Lahore
