= Ghulam Mustafa Khan (literature scholar) =

Pakistani academic (1912–2005)

Ghulam Mustafa Khan ڈاکٹر غلام مصطفیٰ خان
- Born: 23 September 1912; Jabalpur, British India
- Died: 25 September 2005 (aged 93); Hyderabad, Sindh
- Citizenship: Pakistani
- Known for: Islam and Sufism, Urdu literature and Linguistics
- Awards: Sitara-e-Imtiaz by the President of Pakistan

Academic background
- Education: Aligarh Muslim University, Aligarh

Ghulam Mustafa Khan, SI (Urdu: ڈاکٹر غلام مصطفیٰ خان) (23 September 1912 – 25 September 2005) was a Pakistani researcher, literary critic, linguist, author, scholar of Urdu literature and linguistics, educationist and religious and spiritual leader belonging to the Naqshbandi order of Sufism.

== Life and services ==
He was born in Jabalpur, British India on 23 September 1912, in an Urdu-speaking Pashtun family. In 1928 he finished his ninth grade from Anjuman Islamia High School, Jabalpur and went to Aligarh Muslim University, Aligarh for the rest of his education. He received his higher education at the Aligarh Muslim University. He held LLB and M.A. in Urdu literature & Persian and completed his PhD on 12th-century Persian poet Syed Ashruddin Hassan Ghaznavi in 1947. In 1959, he was awarded D.Litt. by Nagpur University, India.

He was initially appointed as a lecturer at the King Edward College, Amrawati and after migration to Pakistan from India he was appointed as a lecturer at Urdu College, Karachi. Later in life, he also served as the head of the Department of Urdu at Sindh University. For his academic and literary contributions, he was honoured with various awards, including the Naqoosh award, Iqbal award and Nishan-i-Sipas.

He published at least 93 research papers, books, translations and compilations. His book on Iqbal and Quran was awarded as the best book ever written on the subject and was awarded the Gold Medal Award by Idara-e-Adbiat, Pakistan (Institute of Literature, Pakistan).

Ghulam Mustafa was a renowned religious and spiritual leader. His students included famous scholars such as Ibn-e-Insha, Jameel Jalibi, Abul Lais Siddiqui, Aslam Farrukhi, Farman Fatehpuri, Moinuddin Aqeel, and Abul Khair Kashfi.

His shrine is situated near N5 (National Highway) Hyderabad.

== Books ==
He was author of more than 100 books in Arabic, Persian, Urdu and English. Some of his notable publications include:

- Iqbāl aur Qurʼān. An analysis of the Urdu and Persian poetical works of Sir Muhammad Iqbal, 1877-1938, with particular reference to his inspiration from the Koran
- Maulānā ʻUbaidullāh Sindhī kī sarguz̲asht-i Kābul. On the life and political activities of Indian Muslim reformer 'Ubayd Allāh Sindī, 1872-1944, against the British while in exile in Afghanistan, 1915-1922
- Urdū men̲ Qurʼān aur Ḥadīs ke muḥāvarāt. On the influence of the Koran and Hadith on Urdu phraseology, includes specimens from the works of noted Urdu poets
- Adabī jāʼize. Series of books reviews on Urdu literature
- Fihrist : Sindh men̲ Urdū mak̲h̲t̤ūt̤āt. List of Urdu manuscripts, found in different libraries or with individuals in Sindh, Pakistan
- Sayyid Ḥasan G̲h̲aznavī : ḥayāt aur adabī kārnāme, Fārsī ke buzurg shāʻir Sayyid Ḥ̦asan G̲h̲aznavī. On the life and works of Ḥasan Ghaznavi, 12th century Persian poet; includes samples from his works; scholarly study
- S̲aqafatī Urdū. On the words and phrases assimilated in Urdu from various Indic languages.
- Fārsī par Urdū kā as̲ar. On the influence of Urdu on the Persian language.
- Ḥālī kā z̲ahnī irtiqā (Progress in the thinking of Hali). Ghulam Mustafa Khan was considered an authority on Maulana Altaf Hussain Hali

== Death and legacy ==
Ghulam Mustafa Khan died on 25 September 2005 at age 93. Many literary organizations and two universities that he was personally associated with expressed sorrow over his death. Iftikhar Arif, then Chairman, Pakistan Academy of Letters said that his death would significantly affect the research work in the field of literature.

Vice-Chancellor of University of Karachi in 2005, Pirzada Qasim called his death a blow to Urdu literature in Pakistan.

== Awards and recognition ==
- Sitara-i-Imtiaz (Star of Excellence) by the President of Pakistan
- Presidential Iqbal Award for writing his book Iqbal and Quran
