= List of Urdu literary critics =

List of Prominent Urdu Literary Critics

This is a list of literary critics who wrote works in Urdu. Most of the writers are from Pakistan and India.

== List ==
- Abdul Aleem
- Abdul Haq (Urdu scholar)
- Abdul Latif
- Abdul Majid
- Shaikh Abdul Qadir
- Abid Ali Abid
- Abid Hassan Minto
- Abul Khair Kashfi
- Abul Lais Siddiqui
- Ahmad Nadeem Qasmi
- Ahmed Ali
- Akhtar Husain
- Ali Sardar Jafri
- Altaf Hussain Hali
- Faiz Ahmad Faiz
- Farman Fatehpuri
- Firaq Gorakhpuri
- Gopi Chand Narang
- Gyan Chand Jain
- Hafiz Mehmood Khan Shirani
- Hamid Ullah Afsar
- Hasan Askari (writer)
- Ijaz Hussain
- Jamil Jalibi
- Kazi Abdul Wadud
- Majnun Gorakhpuri
- Masud Hassan Rizvi
- Meeraji
- Mir Taqi Mir
- Muhammad Ali Siddiqui
- Muhammad Husain Azad
- Mohammad Hameed Shahid
- Rasheed Ahmad Siddiqui
- Sajjad Zaheer
- Saleem Ahmed
- Sayyid Shamsullah Qadri
- Shamim Hanafi
- Shamsur Rahman Faruqi
- Shibli Nomani
- Sulaiman Nadvi
- Waheed Qureshi
- Wazir Agha
- Yousuf Hussain Khan
