= Rauf Parekh =

Pakistani linguist

Rauf Parekh (Urdu: رؤف پاریکھ, romanized: ra'uf pārekh) is an Urdu lexicographer, linguist, humorist and a Pakistani newspaper columnist.

== Early life and career ==
Born in Karachi on August 26, 1958, Parekh was educated in Karachi. Having obtained MA and PhD degrees in Urdu from the University of Karachi, he worked for the Urdu Lughat Board (Urdu Dictionary Board), Karachi, as chief editor from 2003 to 2007.

Farman Fatehpuri, president of the Urdu Lughat Board, said in an interview, "The Urdu Lughat Board plans to publish 22 volumes containing 300,000 words, give or take a few hundred words." He praised Parekh for bringing out two volumes of the Urdu Lughat (Urdu Dictionary) in two years.

Urdu Dictionary Board began its work in 1958, the first volume of the Urdu Lughat (Urdu Dictionary) came out in 1967.

In 2017, Parekh taught Urdu at the University of Karachi and wrote a weekly literary column in Dawn newspaper. In addition to writing research articles, humorous essays and critical writings, he has authored over 20 books. Parekh was appointed director general of National Language Promotion Department, Islamabad, in December 2020. He also writes columns for the Daily Times and Dawn newspapers.

== Bibliography ==
Some of his books are:

- Urdu Lughat (vol. 19, 20, 21) (Urdu Dictionary)
- Awwaleen Urdu Slang Lughat
- Urdu Lughat Navisi (Writing Dictionary in Urdu)
- The Oxford Urdu-English Dictionary
- Asri Adab Aur Samaji Rujhanaat
- Allama Iqbal by Atiya Begum

== Awards and recognition ==
- Pride of Performance Award by the President of Pakistan in 2018
