= Nasreddin Murat-Khan =

Russian-born Pakistani architect (1904–1970)

Nasreddin Murat-Khan TI
- Насреддин Муратханов (Russian) نصر الدین مراد خان (Urdu); Nasruddin Muratxan (Kumyk)
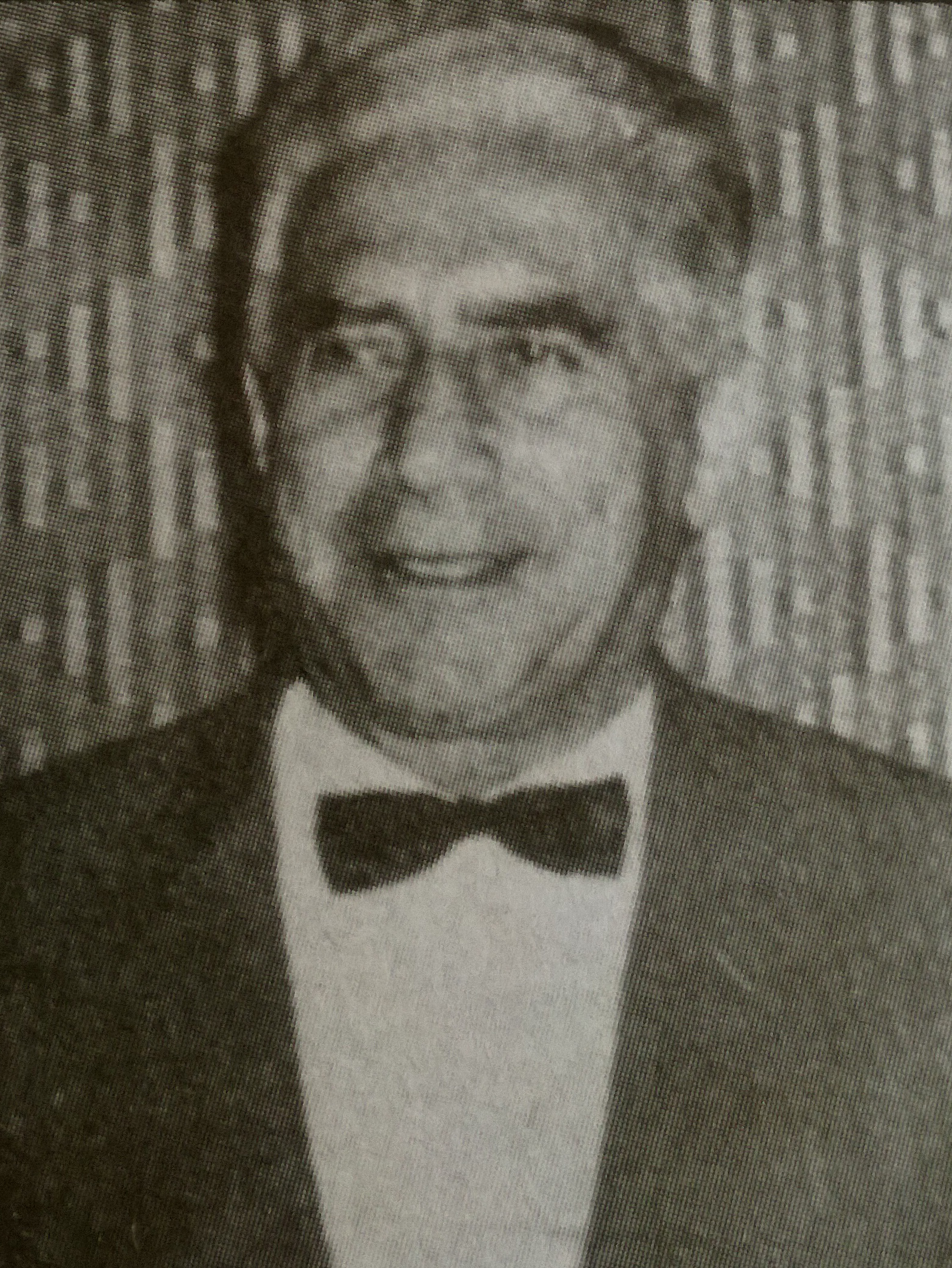
- Murat-Khan in 1962
- Born: 1904; Dagestan Oblast, Russian Empire
- Died: 15 October 1970 (aged 65–66); Lahore, Punjab, Pakistan
- Resting place: New Elahi Park, Misri Shah Cemetery, Lahore; 31°35′9″N 74°19′58″E
- Education: Civil engineering Architecture
- Notable work: Minar-e-Pakistan; Gaddafi Stadium
- Spouse: Hamide Akmut (m. 1944–1970)
- Children: Pari Murat-Khan, Zeynab Ozbek, Maryam Murat-Khan, Mesme Tomason, Meral Murat-Khan (daughters)
- Awards: Tamgha-e-Imtiaz (1963)

Nasreddin Murat-Khan (Note: Kumyk: Nasruddin Muratxan; Ottoman Turkish: نصر الدین مراد خان ِALA-LC: Naṣru l-dîn Murâd-ḫân; Turkish: Nasreddin Murat-han IPA: [nasɾedˈdin muˈɾathan]; Russian: Насреддин Муратханов ALA-LC: Nasreddin Muratkhanov IPA: [nəsrʲɪˈdʲin mʊrɐtˈxanəf]; Urdu: نصر الدین مراد خان ِALA-LC: Naṣru l-dīn Murād Ḵẖān IPA: [nəsrʊd̪ˈd̪iːn mʊˈrɑːt̪xɑːn]) TI (1904 – 15 October 1970) was a Russian-born Pakistani architect and civil engineer. He is renowned for designing the iconic national monument, the Minar-e-Pakistan. He was also the architect of the Gaddafi Stadium and several other notable buildings and structures in Pakistan.

== Life ==
=== Early life ===
Murat-Khan was born in 1904 to a Kumyk Muslim family, in the town of Buynaksk in the North Caucasus region of Dagestan located in the Russian Empire (modern-day Russian Federation). In 1930, he obtained his degree of civil engineering from the Institute of Architects, Town Planners and Civil Engineers at Leningrad State University (now the Saint-Petersburg State University). Later, he also obtained degrees of architecture and town planning from the same university.

=== Exile ===
Murat-Khan was keen to free the Muslim Caucasus region from Soviet control. As a result, he had to flee from Dagestan— in fear of his life—to Germany where he landed sometime in 1944. He stayed as a refugee in one of the camps established by the UNRRA in Berlin, later moving to Mittenwald where he married Hamide Akmut, a Turkish refugee, in 1946. After the six-year-long exile in West Germany, Murat-Khan migrated with his family to Pakistan, in 1950.

=== Death ===
He died of a heart attack on 15 October 1970.

== Professional career ==
In 1930, Nasreddin held a variety of posts in Dagestan and in Leningrad. He was arrested during the "Engineers' Purges" undertaken by Stalin, but was re-instated in February 1940 as Chief Engineer and Chief Architect of the Pyatigorsk branch of the North Caucasian Project Trust. He later served as Chief Engineer and Director of the North Caucasian Project Trust in Woroschilowsk, Ukraine, till August 1942. Murat-Khan planned and designed many buildings of the Soviet Union, which includes a Lenin Memorial. In 1950, after his migration to Pakistan, he was hired as Executive Engineer for PWD at Wah Ordinance Factory. He then was reassigned in 1951 as Special Architect, B&R Deptt., PWD, where he designed the buildings of the Nishtar Hospital and the Nishtar Medical College. In addition, he also prepared the designs of the Mansehra Mental Hospital, the Sahala Police Training College, the Sinclair Hall in Forman Christian College, the Gaddafi Stadium in Lahore (completed in 1959 and initially called the Lahore Stadium) and the Textile College in Faisalabad among many other buildings, townships, residences and other structures.

=== Minar-e-Pakistan ===
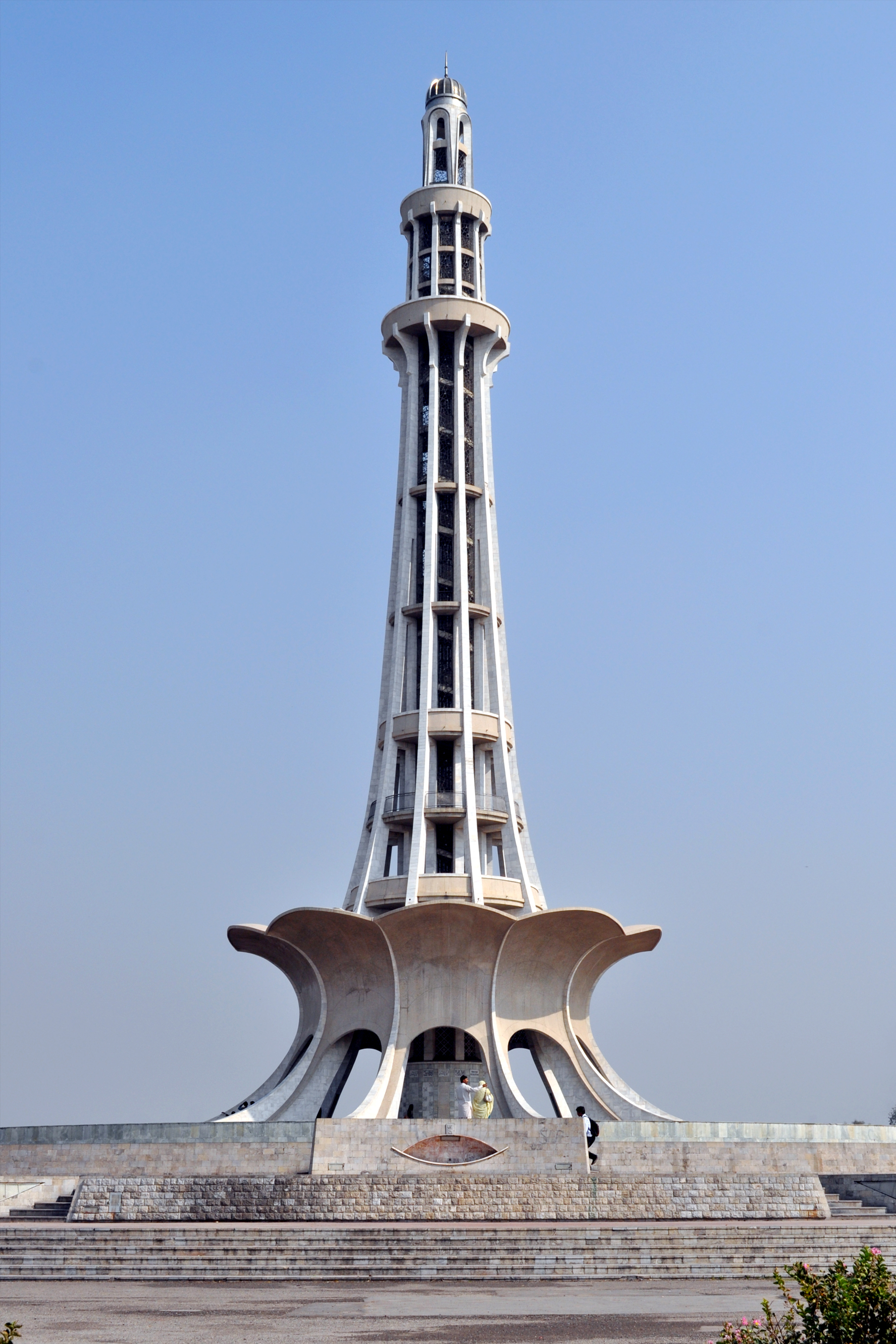
Minar-e-Pakistan, Murat-Khan's masterpiece

Murat-Khan's most notable and memorable work is his design of the Minar-e-Pakistan monument, located at Minto Park (now Iqbal Park) in the walled city of Lahore. The foundation stone of Minar-e-Pakistan was laid at Minto Park on 23 March 1960. In 1963, President Ayub Khan reportedly summoned Murat-Khan to his office and took out a fountain pen from his pocket, placed it upright on his desk and instructed Murat-Khan to "build me a monument like this."

Murat-Khan was very keen on the supervision of the construction and the design. He frequently visited the site to inspect building material, construction quality. He did not take his prescribed fee of Rs. 250,000 and instead donated the amount to the fund created for financing the construction of the Minar-e-Pakistan. The construction of the tower took eight years and by 31 October 1968, the minar was completed at a cost of Rs. 7.5 million.

== Awards ==
In recognition of Murat-Khan's services, the then President of Pakistan, General Ayub Khan, conferred on him the Tamgha-e-Imtiaz (Medal of Excellence) in 1963.

== Views and legacy ==
Murat-Khan was of the view that each local body should have a chief architect of its own. He was also a proponent of Islamic architecture, advocating the retention of a national character in Pakistani architecture.

== Gallery ==
Murat-Khan's architectural contributions

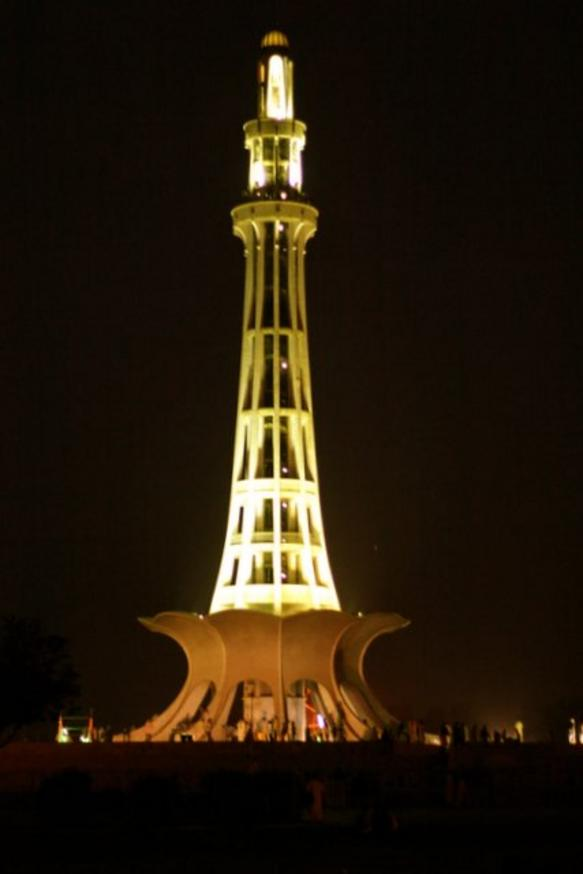
Minar-e-Pakistan at night

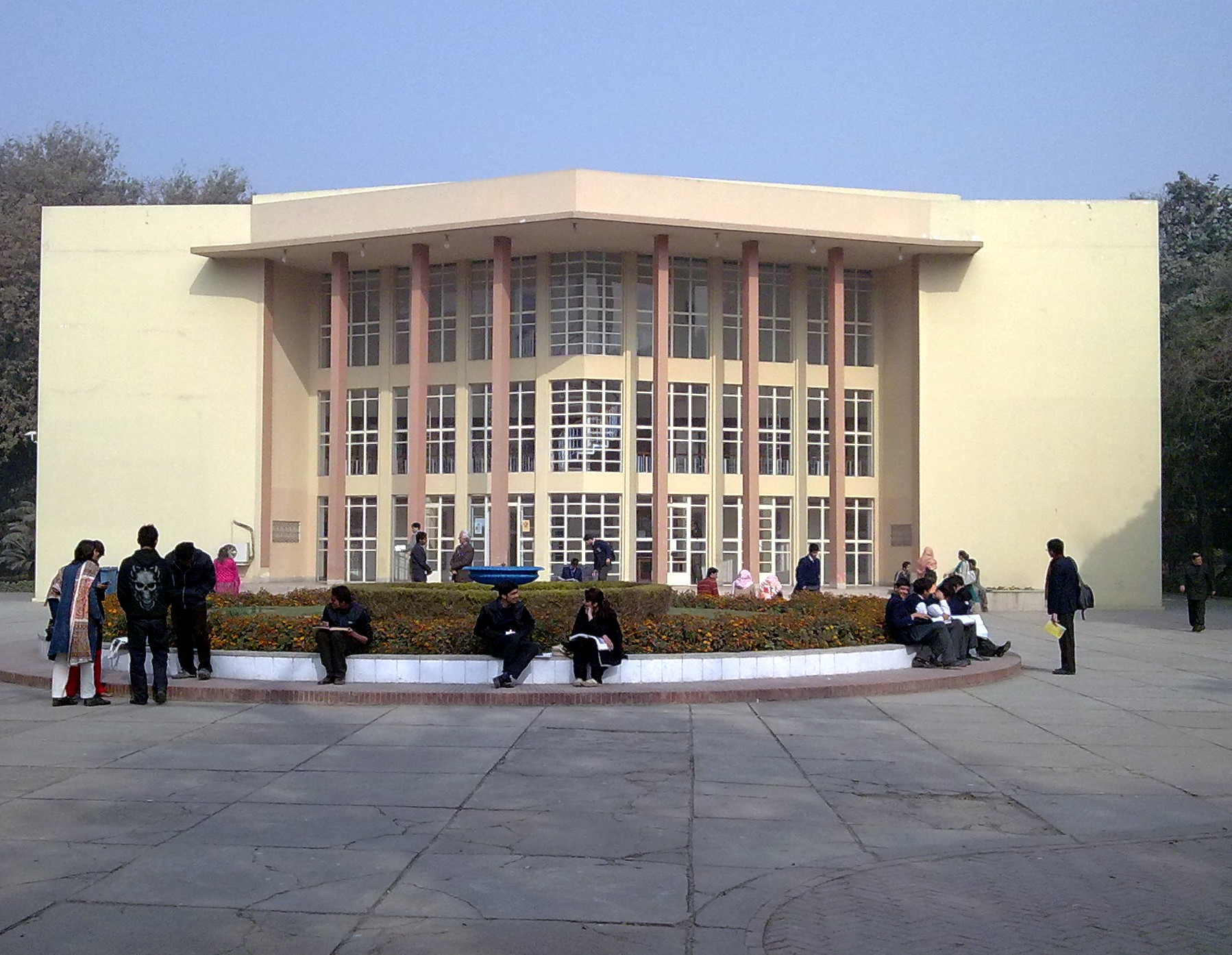
Sinclair Hall in Forman Christian College, Lahore

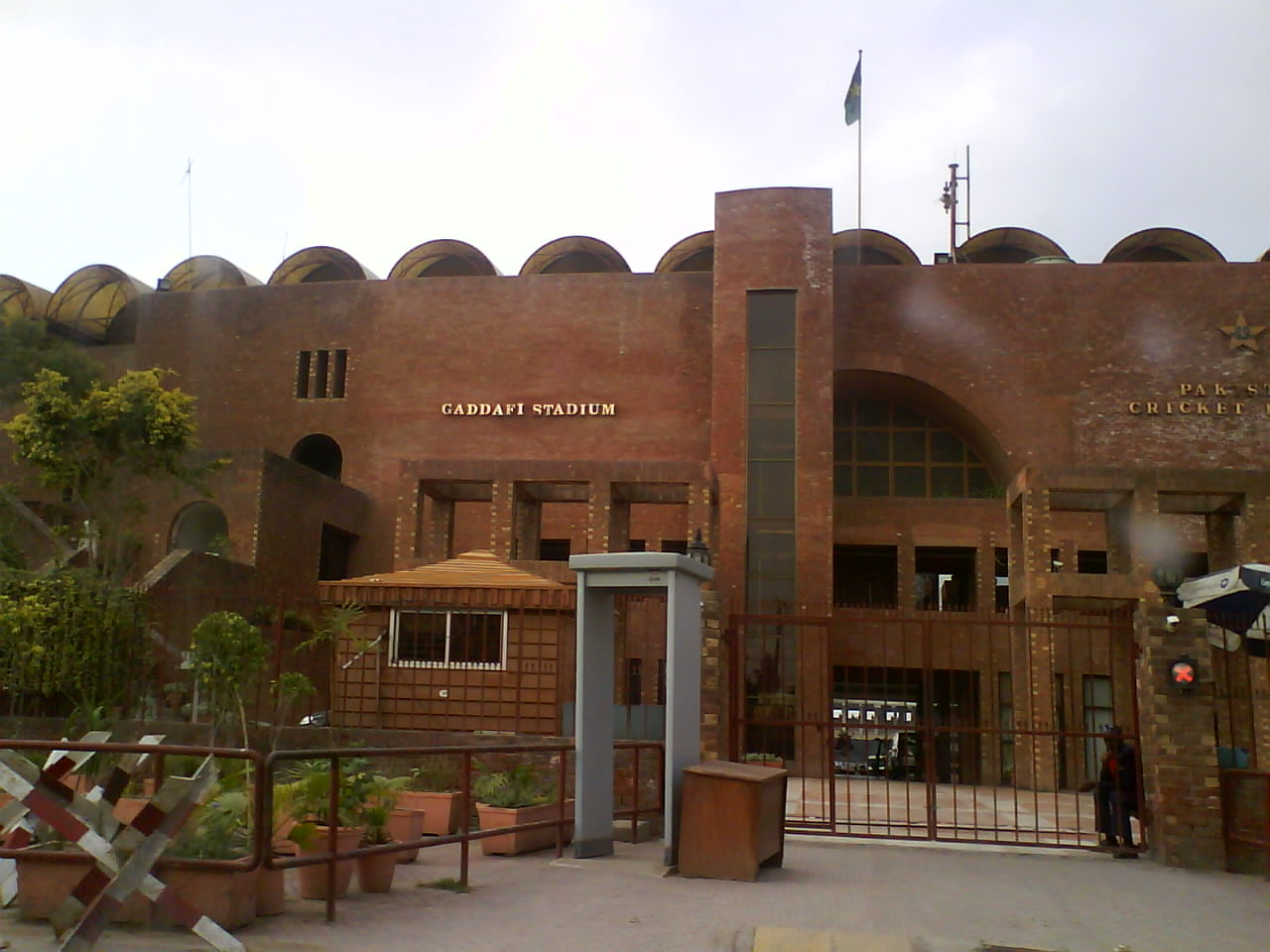
Gaddafi Stadium, Lahore

Buildings of Nishtar Medical College, Multan

== See also ==
- Pakistani architecture
- Russian architecture
- List of Pakistani architects
- List of Russian architects

== Bibliography ==
- Artasia, AICA Regional Secretariat for South Asia and the Far East, 1965, pp. 30–31, "Mr. Nasreddin Murat Khan wondered why there were no chief architects or separate architects for corporations and major municipal committees. He had been moving around in many parts of the world and could state from personal knowledge that architects did exist in other countries for such local bodies He was of the view that the government should immediately take note of this necessity and arrange the creation of these posts in the corporations and at least in the principal municipalities... Mr. Nasreddin Murat Khan emphasised the retention of a national character in our architecture and said that we were a Muslim community stretching from north-west Africa to the Far East. It should be possible to achieve a certain uniformity of approach towards well-defined features of Muslim architecture as such, even though some of these features may no longer be necessary or relevant, and could be dispensed with."
- Biographical Encyclopedia of Pakistan, Biographical Research Institute, Pakistan, for International Publishers, 1970, p. 703, "Nasreddin Murat Khan, T.I.; graduated from the Institute of Architects-Town Planners and Civil Engineers, University of Leningrad (U. S. S. R.) 193fj; is holding degrees in Architecture-Town Planning and in Civil Engineering; was awarded Tamgha-i-Imtiaz by the President ENGINEERING & ARCHITECTURE (PART II) 703."
- Dawn (22 March 2009), Remembrance: The man behind the masterpiece
- The Express Tribune (14 August 2014), Flashback: The forgotten architect
- Saud, Saad (13 June 2015), "Four noted personalities who adopted Pakistan as their motherland", The Express Tribune
- The Nation (10 June 2014), FC College gets a postage stamp
- The Friday Times (27 March 2015), The making of Minar-e-Pakistan, Lahore (circa 1965)
- Jafari, Aqeel Abbas (2010), Pakistan Chronicle (in Urdu) (1st ed.), 94/1, 26th St., Ph. 6, D.H.A., Karachi: Virsa Publications, pp. 171, 198, 216, 225, 273, 320, ISBN 9789699454004
- Samiuddin, Osman (15 November 2014), The Unquiet Ones: A History of Pakistan Cricket, HarperCollins Publishers India, ISBN 9789350298022, "The main attraction of the park now, the Minar-e-Pakistan, commemorates that resolution... It was completed in 1968, a result mostly of the efforts of Nasreddin Murat Khan, a Pakistani of Russian descent who had been part of one of Stalin's many purges."
