= Shahid Ahmad Dehlvi =

Pakistani author and translator

Personal life
- Born: 22 May 1906 Delhi, British India
- Died: 27 May 1967 (aged 61) Karachi, Pakistan
- Relatives: Nazir Ahmad Dehlvi

Religious life
- Religion: Islam

Muslim leader
- Awards: Pride of Performance Award by the Government of Pakistan in 1963

Shahid Ahmad Dehlvi (Urdu: شاہد احمد دہلوی; 22 May 1906 – 27 May 1967) was a Pakistani author, editor and translator.

The Government of Pakistan awarded him the Pride of Performance in 1963, for his literary services. He was the grandson of Urdu novelist and social and religious reformer Nazir Ahmad Dehlvi, popularly known as Deputy Nazir Ahmad.

== Biography ==
Shahid Ahmad was born on 22 May 1906 in Delhi, British India to Bashiruddin Ahmad Dehlvi, son of Nazir Ahmad Dehlvi in a religious family.

In 1930 after completing his education, Dehlvi started the monthly Saqi (ur), (Note: This magazine, Saqi, was started in January 1930 from Delhi and magazine had stopped functioning in 1967.) a literary magazine. Dehlvi's articles in the monthly Saqi portrayed the vanishing culture of Delhi. He believed that the old Delhi, which was considered a symbol of Indo-Muslim culture, was ruined because of the bloodshed at the time of Independence. Aqeel Abbas Jafari has collected his articles in a book.

Dehlvi also ran the Delhi branch of the Progressive Writers' Association and started a literary journal called Shahjahan, devoted to progressive literature.

Dehlvi had interest in classical music, which he formally learned under the guidance of Ustad Chand Khan, belonging to Delhi gharana (the Delhi School of Music) and participated in music programmes on All India Radio, by the name of S. Ahmad. After the partition of India, he moved to Karachi where he worked for Radio Pakistan.

== Awards and recognition ==
In 1963, he was conferred with the Pride of Performance award by the Government of Pakistan.

== Death ==
Shahid Ahmad Dehlvi died on 27 May 1967 in Karachi, where he was buried in the Gulshan-e-Iqbal cemetery.

== Literary works ==
Shahid's works include:

- Ujra diya
- Chand adbī shak̲h̲ṣiyatain̲
- Bazam-e-khush nafsau

== Cited sources ==
- Jafari, Aqeel Abbas (2010). Pakistan Chronicle (in Urdu). Karachi: Fazlee Sons and Varsa. p. 272. ISBN 978-969-9454-00-4.
- Jalil, Rakhshanda (2014). Liking Progress, Loving Change: A Literary History of the Progressive Writers' Movement in Urdu. Oxford University Press. ISBN 978-0-19-809673-3.
- Pakistan, Tareekh (2015). "Birth Shahid Ahmad Dehlvi". Tareekh-e-Pakistan.com website (in Urdu). Archived from the original on 9 July 2021.
