= Urdu Lughat =

1977 Urdu dictionary

- Editors: Molvi Abdul Haq; Abul Lais Siddiqui; Muhammad Arif; Rauf Pareekh; Aqeel Abbas Jafari
- Language: Urdu
- Genre: Dictionary
- Published: Volume 1 in 1977 Volume 2 in 1979; Volume 3 in 1981 Volume 4 in 1982
- Publisher: Urdu Dictionary Board, Karachi
- Publication place: Pakistan

Urdu Lughat is a 22-volume Urdu-to-Urdu dictionary which was published by the Urdu Dictionary Board under the editorship of Molvi Abdul Haq and others in 1977.

== History and format ==
Urdu Lughat is composed in the style of the Oxford English Dictionary. It is the most comprehensive dictionary in the history of Urdu language. It is published by the Urdu Lughat Board, Karachi. The dictionary was edited by the honorary director general of the board Maulvi Abdul Haq who had already been working on an Urdu dictionary since the establishment of the Urdu Dictionary Board, Karachi, in 1958.

Urdu Lughat consists of 22 volumes. In 2019, the board prepared a concise version of the dictionary in two volumes. The dictionary also has an internet version and a mobile app with a sound option.
