= Ghulam Bhik Nairang =

Pakistani writer and politician (1876–1952)

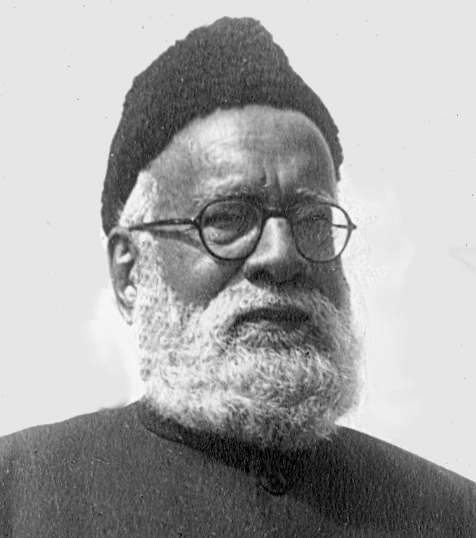
- Born: 8 August 1876; Daurana near Ambala, British India
- Died: 16 October 1952 at age 76
- Occupations: law, politics, poetry, Islam
- Known for: One of the leaders of Pakistan movement

Syed Ghulam Bhik Nairang (26 September 1876 – 16 October 1952) was a distinguished lawyer, poet and Pakistan Movement leader. He was the Deputy Leader of the All-India Muslim League from 1938 to 1942, and was appointed to the Constituent Assembly of Pakistan in April 1950.

== Friendship with Allama Iqbal ==
He was close friends and former college mate of Allama Muhammad Iqbal, who is celebrated as the national poet of Pakistan. Nairang had sketched Allama Iqbal's personality as a college student and had described in an article the exact location of the hostel room Iqbal had resided in at the Government College, Lahore between 1895 and 1900.

In 2016, the evidence mentioned about Iqbal's hostel room in Nairang's article helped the Government College's staff in tracing the exact location of the room.

== Early life and career ==
Ghulam Bhik Nairang was born in Daurana, near Ambala in British India in 1876. He received his BA degree from Government College, Lahore. He also joined the editorial staff of a magazine, Makhzan. Nairang was politically active and became an important leader of Muslim India. He was a member of the Central Legislative Assembly from 1936 to 1942.

Nairang also was actively involved in the Khilafat Movement, played a protective and key role in resisting the anti-Muslim Shuddhi movement by some Hindu leaders in British Punjab where they were trying to reconvert Muslims back to Hinduism.

After migrating to Pakistan, he also was a member of the first Constituent Assembly of Pakistan.

== Books ==
- Kalaam-e-Nairang - Nairang's compilation of poetry was published in 1982 from Karachi, Pakistan (first edition in 1907, second edition in 1917, third edition with detailed introduction by Moinuddin Aqeel in 1982)
