= KU Observatory =

Karachi University Observatory (KU Observatory)
- Organization: Institute of Space and Planetary Astrophysics (ISPA)
- Location: Karachi University, Karachi, Sindh Pakistan
- Coordinates: 24°55′50″N 67°6′55″E
- Altitude: 5,000 m (16,000 ft)
- Established: 1995

Telescopes
- KU Observatory: X-ray telescope
- KU Observatory: Gamma Ray Telescope

The K.U. Observatory or Karachi University Observatory (Urdu: جامعہِ کراچی رصد گاہ) is located on the campus of Karachi University. The space observatory is operated by the Institute of Space and Planetary Astrophysics. The space observatory was established in 1995. The KU Observatory can resist all seismological challenges as its pillars go 15 feet deep into the ground.
