= Fatima Lodhi =

Pakistani social activist (born 1989)

- Born: September 29, 1989 (age 36); Karachi, Pakistan
- Occupation: Social activist
- Years active: 2008–

Fatima Lodhi (born 29 September 1989) is a Pakistani social activist and campaigner against colourism known as the "Champion of Diversity."

== Early life and education ==
Lodhi is the granddaughter of a former All India Cricketer and Karachi selector, Abbas Khan Lodhi. She was born in Karachi, Pakistan, and brought up in Islamabad. She received her early education from St. Patrick's School and has studied towards a master's degree in Philosophy.

== Activism ==
In 2008, she facilitated training for 'inclusive education' British Council workshops and to We Can End Violence Against Women. In 2011, she participated in Rotaract. She has advocated for the rights of the acid burn victims and has been stating against HIV/AIDS, SRHR, and violence against women.

Lodhi launched a global anti-colourism campaign Dark is Divine in September 2013, which she stated is for both women and men. She has described her experiences of the negative impacts of colourism when growing up and the pressure to lighten her skin as "no one will marry you." Her campaign has involved a combination of sharing her message on social media, challenging advertising companies, school outreach work, seminars and grassroots activism. As of 2024, the Dark is Divine movement had become active in 20 countries.

In January 2025, Lodhi spoke to the international affairs and diplomatic magazine Observer Diplomat about the opposition she has faced since launching the Dark is Divine campaign, but how since the launch there has been increased media representation of dark-skinned women in Pakistan and meaningful discussions about how addressing colourism is vital for fostering inclusivity.

== Talks ==
Lodhi had spoken as a motivational speaker at national and international public forums. In 2015, Lodhi delivered a TEDx talk at the University of Gujrat alongside Mir Mohammad Ali Khan and Sania Saeed and moderated a panel discussion at the International Women Empowerment Conference.

In 2022, Lodhi appeared as a guest speaker on the PTV WORLD programme Rising Pakistan on World Day of Acceptance.

== Awards ==
In 2014, Lodhi was awarded the Woman of Excellence award, and in 2015, the Young Woman Leadership Award.
