= Asif Farrukhi =

Pakistani writer and editor (1959–2020)

Asif Aslam Farrukhi آصف اسلم فرخی
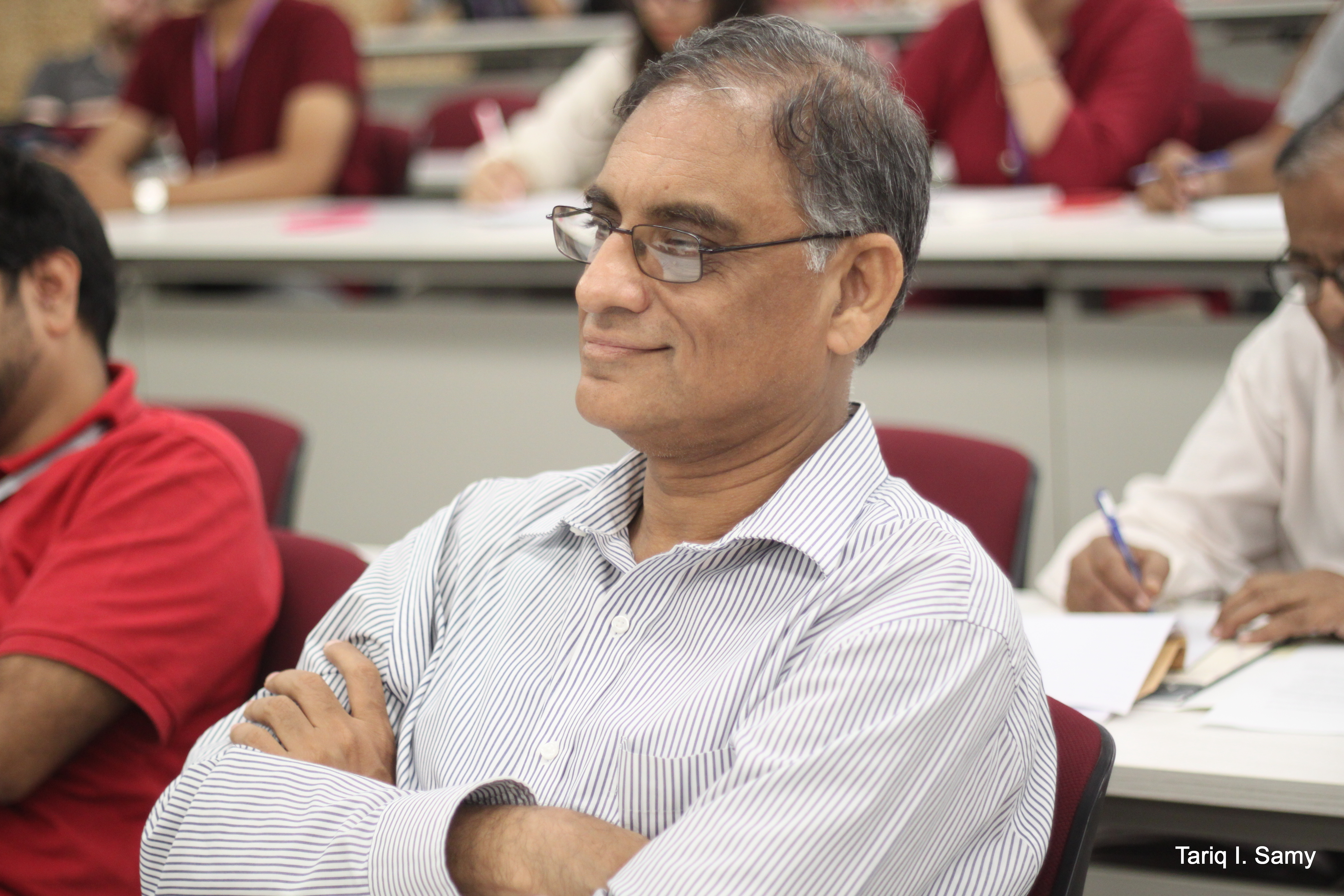
- Asif Farrukhi at Habib University
- Born: Asif Aslam Farrukhi; 16 September 1959
- Died: 1 June 2020 (aged 60); Karachi, Sindh, Pakistan
- Education: Dow University; Harvard University
- Occupations: Writer and Physician
- Parent(s): Aslam Farrukhi اسلم فرخی
- Awards: Prime Minister's award for literature by the Pakistan Academy of Letters in 1997; Tamgha-e-Imtiaz (Medal of Excellence) by the President of Pakistan in 2006

Asif Aslam Farrukhi (Urdu: آصف اسلم فرخی; 16 September 1959 – 1 June 2020) was a Pakistani writer, translator, and literary critic active in both Urdu and English. He was also a public health expert and polyglot. He translated books from English into Urdu, as well as from Sindhi to Urdu and English. His collections of vernacular Pakistani writers translated in English are considered critical anthologies. From 2000 to 2020, he was the editor and publisher of the Urdu literary journal Dunyazad.

== Early life ==
Asif Aslam was born in Karachi in 1959 to Dr Aslam Farrukhi, a Professor of Urdu at Karachi University, and his wife Taj Begum. He was the elder of two sons. He was educated at St Patrick's High School and D.J. Sindh Government Science College, and then went on to complete his MBBS degree at the Dow University of Health Sciences in 1984. He published his first book of short stories, using the name Asif Farrukhi, while still a student at Dow University in 1982. From 1988-1989, he completed a master's degree in public health at Harvard University.

== Literary career ==
Asif Aslam is the author of six collections of short stories and two collections of critical essays in Urdu. He was also a translator, from Sindhi and English to Urdu as well as from Urdu and Sindhi to English. He compiled several English anthologies of writing from Pakistan.

In 2000, he founded the bi-annual literary journal Dunyazad, intended to position new Urdu writing in conversation with global literature in translation. He also founded the Scheherazade Press in 1999 to showcase new writings in Urdu.

From 2010 to 2018 Farrukhi was the co-founder and organizer of the Karachi Literature Festival, in collaboration with Oxford University Press and the British Council. Following creative differences, in 2019, he co-founded the Adab Literature Festival as an alternative literary space.

== Public Health Career ==
From 1985 to 1993, Farrukhi worked at the Aga Khan University's Community Health Services department under the supervision of the public health pioneer John Harland Bryant. From 1994 to 2014, he was the health and nutrition program officer with UNICEF, Karachi. His international and cross-country travels in his professional capacity informed his writing.

In 2014, he joined the then newly-founded Habib University as associate professor of Urdu and director of the Arzu Center for Regional Languages & Humanities. In 2016, he briefly served as Interim Dean of the University's School of Arts, Humanities & Social Sciences.

== Awards ==
- Tamgha-e-Imtiaz (Medal of Excellence) by the President of Pakistan in 2006
- Prime Minister's Literary Award by the Pakistan Academy of Letters in 1997

== Death ==
Farrukhi died suddenly from a cardiac arrest in Karachi on 1 June 2020. He had been a long-term diabetic.
