= Harris Khalique =

Pakistani poet and writer

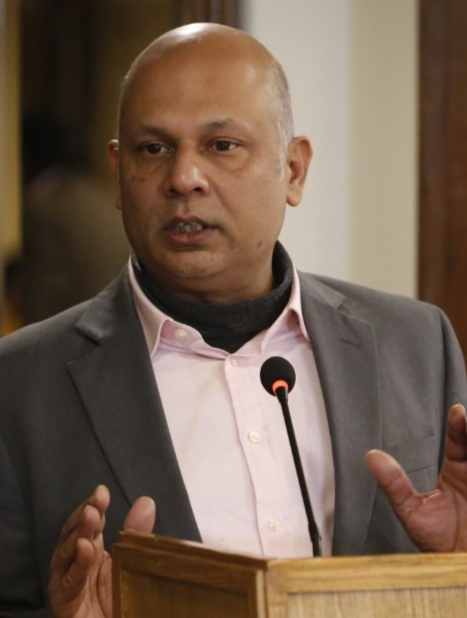
- Born: October 20, 1966; Karachi, Sindh, Pakistan
- Citizenship: Pakistani
- Known for: Poetry, Writing, Activism

Harris Khalique (Urdu: حارث خلیق; born 20 October 1966) is a Pakistani poet in Urdu, English and Punjabi and a civil society activist. Khalique has authored ten collections of poetry and two books of non-fiction. He is currently secretary-general of the Human Rights Commission of Pakistan.

In March 2018, the Government of Pakistan awarded him the Presidential Pride of Performance to acknowledge his contribution to poetry. In 2013, he was awarded the UBL Literary Excellence Award in the category of Urdu poetry for his collection Melay Mein. He is also a University of Iowa Honorary Fellow in Writing. During the 1980s and 1990s, some of his poems faced censorship in Pakistan. Anthologised and published internationally, he is translated into several languages and his poetry is composed to music and dance.

== Early life and education ==
He was born in Karachi, Sindh, Pakistan to filmmaker and writer Khalique Ibrahim Khalique. He lived and worked in Europe before moving to Islamabad, Pakistan. Khalique's paternal ancestors were Kashmiris who had converted to Islam and settled in Lucknow, Awadh. His maternal ancestors were from Amritsar, Punjab.

Khalique holds a degree in mechanical engineering from the NED University of Engineering and Technology in Karachi, and a master's degree in development management from the London School of Economics and Political Science.

== Career ==
Harris Khalique has managed and advised organisations, development projects and human rights campaigns in Pakistan, South Asia and Europe. He has worked with the Aga Khan Foundation, Amnesty International and United Nations agencies. Since March 2019, he is the Secretary-General of the Human Rights Commission of Pakistan. He has published papers and spoken at national and international conferences on history, culture, politics and issues surrounding human rights and international development. He has written for Dawn, The News International, The New York Times, The Hindu, The Friday Times and Deutsche Welles (English).

== Literary accomplishments ==
He gave the keynote speeches at the 12th International Urdu Conference in Karachi, in December 2019, at the 11th Karachi Literature Festival in March 2020, at the 8th Faisalabad Literary Festival in November 2021 and at the 7th Ayaz Melo in Hyderabad, in December 2021.

=== Critical appreciation ===
Leading academic scholar, language historian and author Dr. Tariq Rahman writes, “…Harris Khalique is a major Pakistani poet in English. He uses condensed imagery and laconic, simple and highly evocative words to convey his meaning.” Literary critic, linguist and scholar Fateh Mohammad Malik says, “Harris Khalique stands out amongst his generation of poets. He is the true progressive voice of our times who inspires us to stand for the poor and weak, not by sloganeering in verse but by using aesthetically powerful and contemporary poetic idiom". Poet and essayist Omar Perez (Son of Ernesto Che Guevara) writes, “Harris Khalique explores with self contained mastery, the contrasts between official and untold history." Distinguished scholar-in-residence, St Michael’s College, Vermont, Kristin Dykstra writes, “ His [Khalique's] meditations refract violence, each abstracting human need from a detailed portrait of sorrow.” Speaking of his Urdu poems, poet Zehra Nigah said, “Khalique’s poetry has image-making, wonderment, history and characterisation. It is difficult to include all these elements in a nazm (poem).” Author, critic and professor of Urdu literature, Dr Nasir Abbas Nayyar writes, “Khalique’s poems afford a central place to those things, people and occurrences whose existence is either erased, or pushed to the margins, or put in constant danger by the forces of the bazaar.”

=== Poetry collections ===
- Hairaa'n Sar-i-Bazaar (Urdu, 2021). ISBN 978-969-419-106-5
- No Fortunes to Tell (English, 2019). ISBN 978-9697-834044
- Melay Mein (Urdu, 2012). ISBN 978-969-419-044-0
- Ishq Ki Taqveem Mein (Urdu, 2006). ISBN 969-419-023-1
- Between you and your love (English, 2004, Revised and Expanded, 2012)
- Purani Numaish (Urdu, 2001)
- Saray Kaam Zaroori Thay (Urdu, 1997). ISBN 969-441-019-3
- Divan (English, 1998)
- If wishes were horses (English, 1996)
- Aaj Jab Hui Baarish (Urdu, 1991)

=== Essay collection ===
- Crimson Papers: Reflections on Struggle, Suffering and Creativity in Pakistan (English, 2017). ISBN 9780199407323

=== Co-edited volume of essays ===
- Pakistan: Here and Now (English, 2021). ISBN 978-969-23600-0-5

=== Creative non-fiction ===
- Unfinished Histories (co-written, English, 2002). ISBN 969-516-065-4

=== Monographs ===
- The Latent Transformation: Challenges, Resilience and Successes of Pakistani Women (2011)
- Pakistan Mein Syasi Tabdeeli Ki Simt (Co-written, Urdu, 2007)
- Pakistan: The Question of Identity (2003)

=== Anthologies where work appeared ===
- Windows on the World – 50 writers, 50 views. Penguin US, 2014. ISBN 978-1594205545
- Look at the city from here. Oxford University Press, 2010. ISBN 978-969-7592-01-2
- Pakistani Urdu Verse. Oxford University Press, 2010. ISBN 978-0195478914
- Language for a New Century. W.W. Norton and Co., 2008. ISBN 978-0820326498
- The Poetry of Men’s Lives, The University of Georgia Press. 2004. ISBN 978-0820326498
- Dragonfly in the Sun – 50 years of Pakistani writing in English. Oxford University Press, 1997. ISBN 978-019-5778-48-9
- Best Asian Poetry 2021-2022, Kitaab, 2022. ISBN 978-981-1800-37-5
- Azadi Magro'n Punjabi Nazm, Pakistan Punjabi Adabi Board, 2011. ISBN 978-969-4111-99-5
