= M. Shahid Qureshi =

Pakistani astronomer

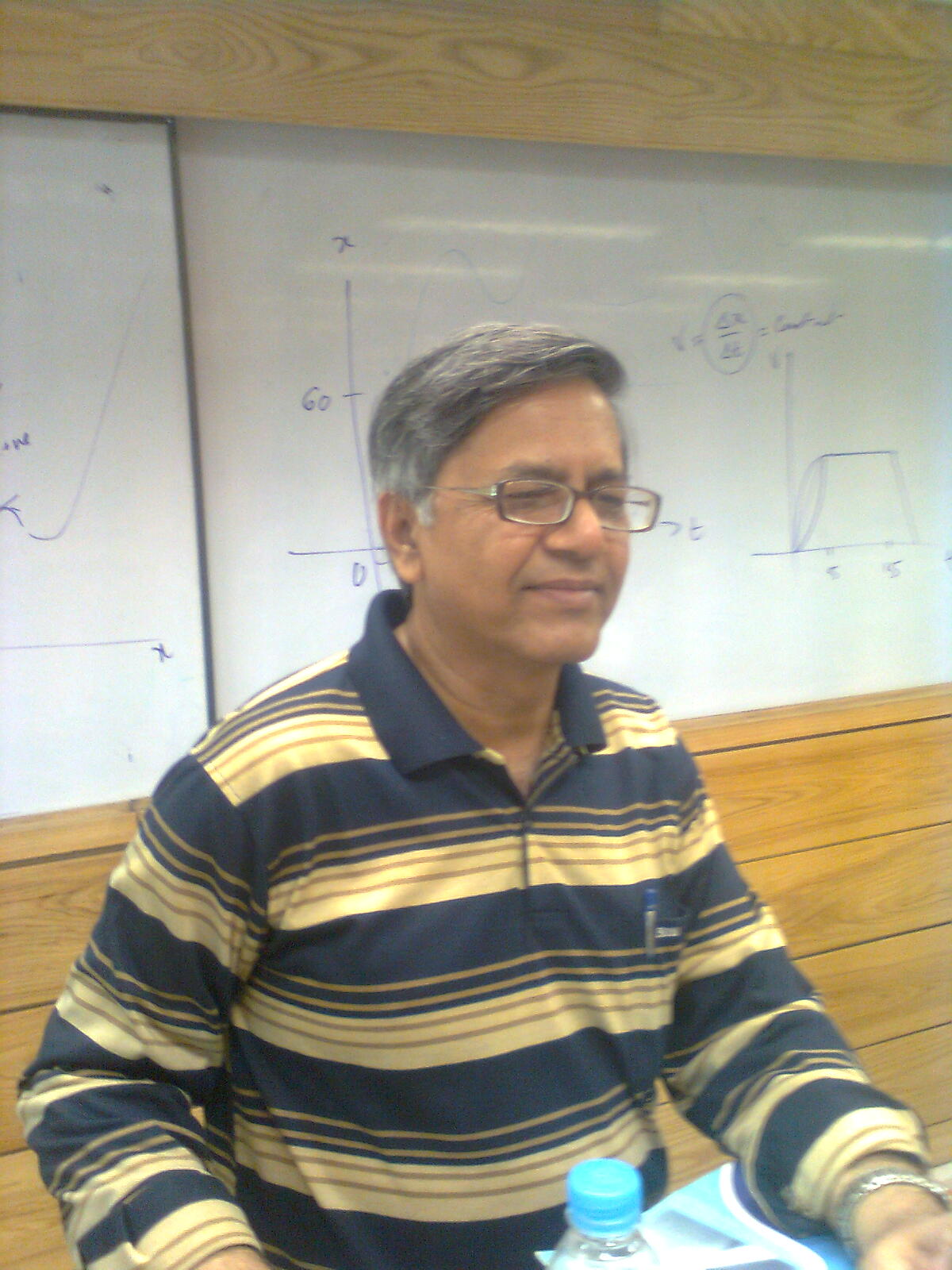
- Born: Karachi, Pakistan
- Education: University of Karachi (UoK)
- Known for: His work on the astrophysics, supersymmetric quantum mechanics (SQM) and Applied mathematics
- Scientific career
- Fields: Astrophysics and astronomy
- Workplaces: Institute of Space and Planetary Astrophysics (ISPA); Karachi University (KU); Institute of Business Administration, Karachi (IBA); Pakistan Institute of Nuclear Science and Technology (PINSTECH)
- Doctoral advisor: Nasiruddin Khan
- Other academic advisors: Khursheed Ather Siddiqui

Muhammad Shahid Qureshi or Shahid Qureshi, styled as M. Shahid Qureshi, is a Pakistani mathematician, astrophysicist and a renowned astronomer. He is an academic and an eminent educationist from Pakistan who has published articles in the fields of astrophysics and astronomy. He is the retired professor of astrophysics and astronomy at Karachi University and Institute of Space and Planetary Astrophysics (ISPA), and former director of ISPA, the country's prominent institution in the field of planetary astrophysics and planetary astronomy. He previously served as an assistant professor of mathematics and computer science. He also the founding director of the Department of Mathematics at Institute of Business Administration, Karachi.

He is an avid supporter of science and technology in Pakistan and has helped directing documentaries concerning about the astrophysics and astronomy. He has also appeared in Geo Television and Dawn News frequently, where he briefed the nation on the solar eclipse of 22 July 2009.

== Biography ==
He graduated and received a BSc with honors in applied mathematics from the Department of Mathematics of University of Karachi in 1979. He then received his MSc in mathematics from the same institution with specialisation in quantum mechanics, and astronomy in 1983. In between, he served United Bank Limited, Karachi as a computer programmer to earn his living. In 1983, after getting his master's degree, he joined as a fellow the Pakistan Institute of Nuclear Science and Technology, where he joined the "Mathematical Physics Group", and did preliminary research there.

He left PINSTECH in 1984, and moved to Karachi, Sindh. He joined the University of Karachi as a lecturer to fulfill his dream to become a professor of mathematics. Under the supervision of noted quantum theorist and renowned particle physicist Khursheed Ather Siddiqui, he did his MPhil in particle physics from University of Karachi, writing a thesis and covered major area in the field of supersymmetric quantum mechanics. In 2002, he moved to the Institute of Space and Planetary Astrophysics on the directions of the then-vice-chancellor of University of Karachi, Zafar Saeed Saifi. Qureshi did his PhD in astrophysics and astronomy from ISPA in 2008.

His doctoral thesis is on the "Earliest Visibility of New Lunar Crescent". He has occasionally lectured in the field computational mathematics at Lahore University of Management Sciences (LUMS). He was serving at the Institute of Business Administration, Karachi (IBA) as the chairperson, Department of Mathematical Sciences of the Faculty of Computer Science, on deputation from University of Karachi and left from his position at IBA on completion of his deputation period in March 2016. At IBA he has not only established the department of Mathematical Sciences, he has also started the double major BS program in mathematics and economics, the first of its kind in Karachi. Moreover, he also played key role in developing the board of advanced studies and research at IBA that led to formalise the graduate programs at IBA. In the meantime he also started MS and PhD programs in mathematics at IBA.

In 1983, he received his MSc in applied mathematics and M.Phil. in 1995 writing his thesis on supersymmetric quantum mechanics, from Karachi University. In 2008, he was awarded his PhD in astrophysics and astronomy, in which he wrote his thesis on "the effects of atmospheric conditions on crescent visibility, from the Karachi University.

== Research in astrophysics and particle physics ==
Qureshi's articles have been printed in international and national physics journals. He has been a known cited researcher in the field of computer programming while studying at Karachi University. He has been researching to the fields of astrophysics in relation with elementary particle physics and published numerous papers at ISPA. In relation to astrophysics to particle physics, he, once elaborate, while giving a lectured:

His work has been far reaching and influential. Due to lack to researches to the fields of astrophysics and astronomy; Qureshi's work has been a vital support to an academic research in astrophysics. At SUPARCO, he also helped manufacturing and setting up the space observatory along with the Chinese scientists.

== Support for rocket science and Satellite Launch Vehicles (SLV) ==
He has been supporting the Satellite Launch Vehicle project program at SUPARCO. He has been also urged that Pakistan should launch its satellites via either Sonmiani or Tilla. In an interview while discussing Pakistan's status on Satellite Launch Vehicle with noted nuclear physicist Dr. Pervez Hoodbhoy. While in discussion, he urged that missiles have very roboost and effective electronics and computer system, the SLVs used the similar technology. Dr. M. Shahid Qureshi also urges that Pakistan has the basic technology to build an SLV.

He discloses the discussion with Dr. Hoodbhoy and said "If we can launch a missile up to a range of 1,500 km, why not build an SLV that can launch low-atmosphere satellites?" he said. According to Dr. M.S. Qureshi, "we can begin by launching navigation, spy and weather satellites, which can go up to 1,500 km into space. This alone can give us a lot of data that we need to buy now".

== Research papers ==
- "Climatic Variability and Linear Trend Models for Major Cities of Pakistan", Journal of Geography and Geology, Canadian Center of Science and Education, Vol. 2, No. 1, 2010.
- "A New Criterion of Earliest Visibility of New Lunar Crescent", Sindh Univ. Res. Jour. (Sci. Sec.), 42(1), 1–18, 2010.
- "On Origin Theories of Ring Galaxies: Observational Data and Modelling”, Astronomy & Applied Mathematics, Vol. I, Ed. S Nuritdinov, Pub.: Fed. Urdu University, Karachi, 67–79, 2009
- “Path of Best Visibility of New Lunar Crescent”, Astronomy & Applied Mathematics, Vol. I, Ed. S Nuritdinov, Pub.: Fed Urdu University, Karachi, 156–161, 2009
- “Celestial Objects’ Visibility Concern in Karachi", Astronomy & Applied Mathematics, Vol. I, Ed. S Nuritdinov, Pub.: Fed Urdu University, Karachi, 185–194, 2009
- “Error Minimization in Polynomial Approximation of ΔT”, J. Astrphys. Astr., 29, 363–366, 2008
- “Assessing Polynomial Approximation of ΔT”, J. basic appl. Sci., 4(1), 1–4, 2007.
- “Methods of Calculating Crescent Lengths”, J. basic appl. Sci., 3(2), 65–72, 2007
- “A Comparative Study of Arithmetic Lunar Calendar, Observational and Predicted Lunar Calendar for Pakistan for Years 2000–2004”, J. basic appl. Sci., 2(2), 91–103, 2006
- “A New Variable Step Size Algorithm for Solving Initial Value Problems”, J. basic appl. Sci., 2(1), 37–44, 2006
- “Taqweemat aur Qudrati Mazahir”, Al-Tafseer, 2(1), 101–107, 2006
- “A Fuzzy Mathematical Model of Maximum Likelihood Estimates”, J. basic appl. Sci., 1(2), 95–100, 2005
- “Differential Mental Growth Model”, J. basic appl. Sci. 1(1), 11–13, 2005
- “On the Modern Approach to the earliest Visibility of Lunar Crescent”, Kar. Un. J. Isl. St., VII(I-II), 54–76, 2005
- “From No-Go Theorems to Supersymmetry Algebra”, Kar. Univ. J. Sc., 32(1&2), 55–62, 2004.
- “SUSY Algebra for One Dimensional Quantum Mechanical Systems and its Application”, Kar. Univ. J. Sc. 28(2), 25–32, 2000.
- “Generalisation of Operator Method and its Application” Kar. Univ. J. Sc. 28(1), 83–94, 2000.
- “Solvable Supersymmetric Systems", Kar. Univ. J. Sc. 23(1&2), 27–38, 1995.
