= Mir Mohammad Ali Khan =

Pakistani investment banker (born 1965)

- میر محمد علی خان
- Born: Karachi, Pakistan
- Organization: ecademy.pk
- Spouse: Shamaila Ali Khan
- Children: 3
- Website: mirmak.pk

Mir Mohammad Ali Khan also known as MirMak, is a Pakistani stockbroker and a fugitive who is known for allegedly misappropriating millions of dollars from multiple clients of his brokerage firm; among them are individuals associated with the Gambino crime family.

During an interview, Khan stated that he was acting as an adviser to President Pervez Musharraf when The New York Times published a story about him in 2000.

== Early life and career ==
Khan was born in Karachi, Pakistan. He claims his lineage to the royal family of Mir Osman Ali Khan.

Khan studied at Sharfabad Government School for the first few years of his education. He moved to the United States in his early teenage years with his family. He worked for two years at a video rental store while he was a student at Rutgers University between 1985 and 1989. Alikhan acknowledged later in interviews with the US regulators that he never earned a Rutgers degree.

In early 1995, Alikhan founded a small brokerage firm named Klein, Maus & Shire, situated on Wall Street in New York City. According to a report by the Financial Industry Regulatory Authority, the company was established in August 1994 in Indiana solely as a broker-dealer entity.

Khan served as both the chairman and president of Klein; Asim Sain Kohli, his brother-in-law, held the position of chief operating officer.

== Legal issues ==
=== Indictment in the United States ===
On 12 May 1999, the New York Post reported that members of the Gambino crime family were suing Klein, Maus & Shire, of which Alikhan was CEO, for fraud and breach of fiduciary duty. The firm closed in February 1999.

Alikhan was charged by the Security and Exchange Commission (SEC) and a Manhattan Grand Jury on 17 May 1999, accused of five counts of Grand Larceny in the Second Degree for stealing funds from five clients, including Thomas Gambino. If convicted, he faced up to 25 years in prison on each count. Alikhan fled to Pakistan along with his wife and two sons, leaving his brother-in-law Kohli and his employee Maurice A. Gross Jr. to face the consequences of the firm's collapse.

In a 2016 interview, he claimed to have "defeated Zionists" in the SEC fraud cases. In a 2017 interview, he called Wall Street "Zionist-ic" and claimed that he closed Klein, Maus & Shire following a conflict with the Attorney General of New York Eliot Spitzer and also said that he "will fight one day the allegations that the (US) Securities and Exchange Commission has levelled against" him.

=== Indictment in Pakistan ===
In May 2017, the Chairman of the Securities and Exchange Commission of Pakistan held a press conference where he accused Alikhan of selling pump and dump stocks to his followers on social media and disclosed the discovery of a "cybercrime racket" operated by Alikhan. The Chairman clarified that Alikhan was apprehended "red-handed" for defrauding small investors by leveraging his influence on social media platforms and described Alikhan by the Securities and Exchange Commission of Pakistan as a "fraud" and a “self-styled stock guru”", and accused Alikhan of misleading people for his personal gain. Chairman further clarified that the Securities and Exchange Commission of Pakistan had been closely monitoring Alikhan for two years as part of an ongoing investigation and announced their intention to file criminal charges against him. The Securities and Exchange Commission of Pakistan also confirmed that Alikhan is not registered with the commission as a regulated individual to provide investment advice.

During an interview, Alikhan also claimed to have provided unofficial advice to Nadeem Naqvi, the Managing Director of the Pakistan Stock Exchange, for several years. However, Naqvi denied Alikhan's claims, labeling them as "inaccurate".

=== Investors Lounge ===
In 2013, his company AMZ MAK Capital invested funds into a startup known as Investor Guide 360. However in 2016, four entrepreneurs associated with the startup faced legal scrutiny over alleged copyright infringement after Alikhan, as complainant, accused them of breaching their agreement by leaving the company after the online portal was ready, taking the source code with them. However, Baqar Abbas Jafri, CEO of the startup, refuted the allegations, stating that the claims of theft by Alikhan were baseless. In response, they initiated separate defamation lawsuits against Alikhan.

Jehan Ara, the head of Nest i/o, where the startup was incubated, also dismissed the case brought by Alikhan as lacking any merit. She described his accusations as false and without foundation. Consequently, the entrepreneurs were exonerated of any wrongdoing by the Sindh High Court (SHC). The SHC stated in its ruling that Alikhan did not provide evidence against the four entrepreneurs. Jafri also observed that Alikhan repeatedly failed to attend hearings at the SHC due to his inability to furnish evidence against the entrepreneurs. It was also alleged that Alikhan had a "special interest" in commencing legal actions against the four entrepreneurs of the Investor's Lounge and that Alikhan was leveraging his influence to preemptively shutdown the startup, considering Investors Lounge as his competitor.
