= Urdu Ki Aakhri Kitab =

1971 Urdu book by Ibne Insha

- Author: Ibn-e-Insha
- Language: Urdu
- Genre: Humor
- Publisher: Lahore Academy
- Publication date: 1971-01-01
- Publication place: Pakistan
- Media type: Hardcover
- Pages: 160

Urdu Ki Aakhri Kitab (Urdu: اردو کی آخری کتاب, lit. 'The Last Book of Urdu') is a 1971 Urdu comic and satirical book by Ibn-e-Insha. It is a parody of Muhammad Hussain Azad's textbook "Urdu Ki Pehli Kitab". The Dawn newspaper included Urdu Ki Aakhri Kitab in its list of the best 100 Urdu books of all times.

== Synopsis ==
Urdu Ki Aakhri Kitab is a parody of Urdu textbooks and the author mentions "Unsanctioned by the textbook board" on its cover. The book makes funny descriptions of grammar, mathematics, geography, history, etc.
