= Ibn-e-Insha =

Pakistani poet, travelogue writer and columnist (1927–1978)

Ibn-e-Insha ابنِ اِنشا
- Born: Sher Muhammad Khan; 15 June 1927; Phillaur, Punjab, British India
- Died: 11 January 1978 (aged 50); London, England
- Occupations: Urdu poet, humorist, Travelogue writer and newspaper columnist
- Children: Roomi Insha (died 16 October 2017) & Saadi Insha
- Writing career
- Pen name: Insha
- Genre: Ghazal
- Notable awards: Pride of Performance Award in 1978 by the President of Pakistan
- Movement: Progressive Writers Movement

Sher Muhammad Khan (Urdu: شیر مُحمّد خان, Punjabi, شیر محمد خان), better known by his pen name Ibn-e-Insha (Urdu: اِبنِ اِنشا, Punjabi, ابن انشا; 15 June 1927 – 11 January 1978), was a Pakistani Urdu poet, humorist, travelogue writer and newspaper columnist.

Along with his poetry, he was regarded as one of the best humorists of Urdu. His poetry has a distinctive diction laced with language reminiscent of Amir Khusro in its use of words and construction that is usually heard in the more earthy dialects of the Hindi-Urdu complex of languages, and his forms and poetic style have influenced generations of young poets.

== Biography ==
Insha was born in Phillaur tehsil of Jalandhar District, Punjab, British India. His father hailed from Rajasthan. In 1946, he received his B.A. degree from Punjab University and subsequently, his M.A. from University of Karachi in 1953. He was associated with various governmental services including Radio Pakistan, the Ministry of Culture and the National Book Centre of Pakistan.

He also served the UN for some time and this enabled him to visit many places, all of which served to inspire the travelogues he would then pen. His journeys took him to Japan, the Philippines, China, Hong Kong, Thailand, Indonesia, Malaysia, India, Afghanistan, Iran, Turkey, France, UK and the United States. His teachers included Habibullah Ghazenfar Amrohvi, and Ghulam Mustafa Khan. In the late 1940s, in his youth, Ibn-e-Insha had also lived along with the renowned film poet Sahir Ludhianvi in Lahore for a short period. He was also active in the Progressive Writers Movement.

== Death and legacy ==
Ibn-e-Insha spent the remainder of his life in Karachi before he died of Hodgkin's Lymphoma on 11 January 1978, while he was in London. He was buried in Karachi. His son, Roomi Insha, was a Pakistani filmmaker, who died on 16 October 2017.

Veteran Pakistani writer and humorist Anwar Maqsood says about him, "Ibn-e-Insha was my hero. Writers learned writing by reading his books. Nobody could put pen to paper with the humorous aesthetics that he only, possessed. Today's generation should leave the internet browsing and read Ibn-e-Insha".

Another noted Pakistani playwright Bano Qudsia said about him, "Nobody can write or speak like Ibn-e-Insha. There is a gaping hole in our literary world without him. He wrote from his heart, which made him unique".

== Literary career ==
Insha is considered to be one of the best poets and writers of his generation. His most famous ghazal Insha Ji Uttho Ab Kooch Karo (Rise oh Insha Ji, and depart) is an influential classic ghazal first popularised by the classical music singer Amanat Ali Khan in 1974. Ibn-e-Insha had written several travelogues, showcasing his sense of humor and his work has been appreciated by both Urdu writers and critics. He also translated a collection of Chinese poems into Urdu in 1960.

== Bibliography ==
Poetry

- Chand Nagar چاند نگر
- Is Basti Key Ik Koochey Mainاِس بستی کے اِک کوچے میں
- Dil-e-Wehshi دلِ وحشی
- Billo Ka Basta بِلو کا بستہ (Rhymes for Children)
- Qissa Aik Kunvaaray Ka (A translation of a lengthy humorous poem by a German poet Wilhelm Bosch)

=== Popular poems ===
- Inshaji Uttho Ab Kooch Karo, Iss Shehr Mein Jee Ka Lagana Kia, Sung by Ustad Amanat Ali Khan, music by Khalil Ahmed, a Radio Pakistan, Lahore production (1974).
- Kal Chaudhwin Ki Raat Thi, Shab Bhar Raha Charcha Tera, Sung by Jagjit Singh became highly popular both in India and Pakistan in the 1980s.
- Yeh Baatein Jhuutii Baatein Hain, Yeh Logon Ne Phalaain Hain, Sung by ghazal singer Ghulam Ali is another one of his popular poems.
- Sab Maya Hai, Sung by the Pakistani folk singer Attaullah Khan Esakhelvi at Coke Studio (season 10), Pakistan in September 2017.

Travelogue

- Awara Gard Ki Diary آوارہ گرد کی ڈائری
- Dunya Gol Hey دنیا گول ہے
- Ibn Battuta Kay Taqub Mein (1974)
- Chaltay Ho To Cheen Ko Chaliye چلتے ھو تو چِین کو چلیے (published in 1960)
- Nagri Nagri Phira Musafar نگری نگری پِھرا مسافر

Humor

- Urdu Ki Aakhri Kitab (1971) اردو کی آخری کتاب
- Khat Insha Jee Kay خط انشّا جی کے Collection of letters
- Khumar e Gandum خمارِگندم
- Aap se kya Parda آپ سے کیا پردہ (published in June 2004)
- Batain Insha ji ki (published in June 2005)
- Dakhl Dar Ma'qulaat (published in June 2019)

Translations

- Seher Honay Tak (translation of Cherkhov work)
- Karnamay Nawab Tees Maar Khan Kay (translation of German Short stories), published in June 1971
- Lakhon Ka Shaher (translation of some short stories of O. Henry)
- Andha Kunvaan (translation of some short stories of Edgar Allan Poe)

== Awards and recognition ==
- Ibn-e-Insha was awarded the Pride of Performance Award by the President of Pakistan in 1978.

== See also ==
- List of Pakistani poets
- List of Urdu language poets
- List of Pakistani writers
- List of Urdu language writers
