= Saleem Karim =

Pakistani cricketer (born 1965)

Saleem Karim born (born 1965 in Karachi) is a Pakistani disabled Cricket Team founder, cricketer and a businessman. Karim, was born with polio in his right leg and later had accident while riding a bike, in which his left leg was effected.

Despite all this, his interest to play cricket was not affected. He started playing cricket as a hobby but, as he grew older, he realized that there was a need to form a cricket team dedicated to the disabled people, which would give them a chance to play with people with similar abilities. Rather depending on the Pakistani government to support this cause, Karim went his way and founded a cricket team with people with disabilities in the year 2006. The team has since won many laurels and gained recognition in the country. Karim, funds the team himself. Karim, has also been able to organize two national championships, sparking country-wide interest.

The Team has also done their first international tour of Malaysia and Singapore.
