= Shan-ul-Haq Haqqee =

Poet, writer and linguist

- Born: 15 September 1917; Delhi, British India
- Died: 11 October 2005 (aged 88); Mississauga, Ontario, Canada
- Occupations: Urdu poet, writer, lexicographer
- Spouse: Begum Salma Haqqee
- Writing career
- Genre: Ghazal
- Notable awards: Tamgha-e-Quaid-e-Azam Award; Sitara-e-Imtiaz Award

Shan-ul-Haq Haqqee (Urdu: شان الحق حقـّی), Sitara-e-Imtiaz, Tamgha-e-Quaid-i-Azam, (15 September 1917 – 11 October 2005) was an Urdu poet, writer, journalist, broadcaster, translator, critic, researcher, linguist and lexicographer of Pakistan.

== Early life ==
Born in Delhi, Haqqee acquired his BA degree from Aligarh Muslim University. He obtained a Master's degree in English literature from St. Stephen's College, Delhi.

His father, Ehtashamuddin Haqqee, wrote short stories, a study of Persian poet Hafez Shirazi, Tarjuman-ul-Ghaib, a translation of Diwan-i-Hafez in verse and assisted Baba-e-Urdu Maulvi Abdul Haq in compiling his Lughat-i-Kabeer (Grand Urdu Dictionary).

== Contribution to Urdu ==
Haqqee published two collections of his poems, Taar-i-Pairahan (1957) and Harf-i-Dilras (1979). He also published a collection of ghazals under the title, Dil ki Zuban.

His other publications include:

- Naqd-o-Nigarish (a work of literary criticism)
- Maqalaat-e-Mumtaz
- Shaakhsaanay (Short stories)
- Maqam-e-Ghazal (edited work of Hafiz Hoshiarpuri)
- Nashid-i-Hurriyat
- Nukta-e-Raz (collection of research articles on Urdu poetry)
- Bhagvad Gita (Urdu translation)
- Darpan Darpan (translated poetry from various languages)
- Intikhab-e-Kalam-e-Zafar (a selection of Mughal emperor Bahadur Shah Zafar's poetry)
- Qitaat-e-Tareekh-e-Wafat-e-Ahle-Qalam-wa-Mutaliqeen-e-Ahle-Qalam
- Lisani Masail-o-Lataif (collection of research articles dealing with Urdu poetry)
- Nazr-e-Khusro Pahelian Keh Mukarniyan
- Aaeena-e-Afkar-e-Ghalib
- Nok Jhonk
- Suhaanay Taraanay
- Phool Khilay Hain Rung Birnagay
- Anjaan Rahi (translation of Jack Shaffer's novel Shane)
- Teesri Duniya (translation of essays on politics and economy)
- Soor-i-Israfeel (translation of Bengali poet Qazi Nazrul Islam)
- Khayabaan-e-Pak (anthology of Pakistan's folk poetry of about 40 poets)

His autobiography was serialized in the Urdu journal Afkaar. He also translated Shakespeare's Antony and Cleopatra and Chanakya Kautilya's Arthashastra.

He also wrote other genres of poetry, such as Peheylian, Kehmukarnian, and Qitat-i-Tareekhi.

== As a lexicographer ==
In addition to his regular professional duties, he remained associated with the Urdu Dictionary Board for 17 years from 1958 to 1975, compiling a 22-volume dictionary. He compiled two other dictionaries. Farhang-e-Talaffuz is a pronouncing dictionary of Urdu published by the National Language Authority. The Oxford English-Urdu Dictionary is a translation of the eighth and ninth editions of the Concise Oxford English Dictionary.

One of his personal friends was the former Chairman of Pakistan Academy of Letters and National Language Authority, Iftikhar Arif, who remembers him fondly. After his death in 2005, he said that Haqqee had worked diligently and hard most of his life and had a strong belief in the proper use of talaffuz with special emphasis on diction and pronunciation.

== Awards and recognition ==
- Sitara-i-Imtiaz (Star of Excellence) by President of Pakistan
- Tamgha-e-Quaid-e-Azam by Ayub Khan (President of Pakistan)

== Death ==
He died from complications of lung cancer in Mississauga, Ontario, Canada while under his daughter's care on 11 October 2005. He was 87. Haqqee left five sons and one daughter. Like his wife, teacher Salma Haqqee, who died exactly two years earlier, he was buried in Mississauga, Canada. His wife was also a graduate of Aligarh Muslim University. Being an intellectual herself, she understood Haqqee's passion for his work and was a source of support for him all their married life.
