= Jehan Ara =

Pakistani businesswoman

- Born: Karachi
- Occupation: CEO of Katalyst Labs
- Years active: 1994-Present
- Honours: Tamgha-e-Imtiaz

Jehan Ara is a Pakistani businesswoman who was the president of P@SHA (Pakistan Software Houses Association) for over 20 years. She resigned at the end of April 2021 to start Katalyst Labs, a startup accelerator and women leadership program.

She also headed the Nest i/o, a startup technology incubator supported by Google and Samsung. She also served as a member of the Prime Minister's Task Force on IT and Digital Economy and on the Board of Punjab IT Board, the Central Depository Company and IDEAS. Jehan Ara's influence is no secret to those associated with the IT industry in Pakistan.

== Early life ==
Ara was born in Karachi, Pakistan and raised in Hong Kong where her father was working as a banker. She received her early education from Rosaryhill School in Hong Kong.

After completing her graduation, she started her career as a journalist in a Hong Kong newspaper for a year before moving into advertising.

She worked in Dubai for several magazines and journals when her father moved to the United Arab Emirates where she worked for Gulf News in the advertising and marketing department.

She later moved back to Hong Kong and joined Headway Media Services as managing director. She moved to Pakistan in the mid-1990s after the retirement of her father.

== Career ==
After moving to Pakistan with her family which was after her father's retirement in the mid-1990s, Ara started her own multimedia company, Enabling Technologies in 1994. Eventually Jehan Ara and her company became known in Pakistan and they started getting clients. Her company was one of the first companies in Pakistan in the field of information technology. Jahan Ara spent some years supporting and developing the tech community in Pakistan. In 2007, Ara became president of P@SHA.

In November 2018, she became a member of the Prime Minister's Task Force on IT and Telecom.

In 2021, she launched her own company named "Katalyst Labs", an accelerator and innovation hub for startups in Pakistan.

"Jehan Ara is a strong advocate of Cyber Security, Privacy and Data Protection legislation in Pakistan".

"We have a young population who understands technology and has access to mobile phones. This is a growing market because everything that is developed can be delivered via the mobile phone. Many large corporations use technology to enhance the visibility of their products and services. The entire ecosystem of entrepreneurship functions on combination of technology and young people, and Pakistan has a large and growing population of young people, many of whom are excited by technology".

== Awards and recognition ==
In May 2016, Ara was invited by US President Barack Obama to speak at Global Entrepreneurship Summit.

In March 2016, she also spoke at the Columbia University, New York.

In 2023, she was awarded Tamgha-i-Imtiaz (Medal of Excellence) by the President of Pakistan.
