= Minocher K. Spencer =

Yogi Minocher K. Spencer was a Parsi author and spiritual healer who lived in Karachi, Pakistan where he also worked as a metal merchant. Spencer was born in Pune, Maharashtra, India on 4 October 1888 and died 30 August 1958. He claimed that he was guided by the spirit of a deceased guru, Rishi Ram Ram, and later by Sai Baba of Shirdi (also deceased). He claimed to have attained 'Jeevan Mukti' during his life. He wrote a number of books that were published posthumously, including:

- How I found God
- The other world
- Joyous mysticism
- Great mystics saints of the world
- Understanding the divine mysteries
- Romance of the soul (1954)

The most important of his books is How I found God. In this book, Spencer wrote all his experiences first hand. His cousin H. Spencer also helped him in his journey to God. His life can be divided in different phases according to spiritual development. His life changed in 1930 when he met a mystic in Lahore. That mysterious person with occult powers told him that he had hidden spiritual powers of becoming a medium. He started writing articles in local newspaper on a weekly basis where he was criticised by few persons of theosophical society for his view for spirituality. Later he met a lady in London which catalysed his spiritual growth.

In his second phase of intensification of love for God, he came in contact with "spiritual healing center, Coimbatore (South India)". Rishi Ram Ram was the spiritual guide of the center at that time. Rishi Ram Ram was born 2500 years ago in Orissa, India. He was living in spiritual plane at that time and helping souls eager to know God's love. Rishi Ram Ram promised him to help. Later, in 1960 Rishi Ram Ram left spiritual plane and merged in God. M.K. Spencer was told to read holy scriptures and write spiritual stuff. He followed the same. During that time he wrote Oneness with God. Slowly and steadily his desire of meeting God intensified. He spent more and more time in his altar room. His meditation sessions started at 2 am and lasted late into the night. He forgot his daily mundane work and worries. Later Rish Ram Ram handed him over to Shirdi Sai Baba, saint of the saints. Sai baba helped him in achieving the perfection and purity required to meet God.
