= Institute of Space and Planetary Astrophysics =

Pakistani research institute

Institute of Space and Planetary Astrophysics / Institute of Space Science and Technology (I.S.S.T.)
- Motto: "O my Lord! Advance me in Knowledge"
- Parent institution: University of Karachi
- Founder: Jawaid Quamar
- Established: 1994
- Focus: Astrophysics and Mathematics research
- President: Muhammad Ajmal Khan
- Director: Muhammad Jawed Iqbal
- Faculty: 8
- Staff: 7
- Key people: Jawaid Quamar
- Owner: University of Karachi
- Address: University Road, Karachi
- Location: Karachi, Pakistan
- Coordinates: 24°55′50″N 67°6′55″E
- Interactive map of Institute of Space and Planetary Astrophysics / Institute of Space Science and Technology (I.S.S.T.)

The Institute of Space and Planetary Astrophysics, renamed to Institute of Space Science and Technology, also known as by its abbreviation (I.S.S.T.), is a national research institute of the University of Karachi, engaging the theoretical and applied studies and research related to astronomy, astrophysics, satellite communication, space flight dynamics, atmospheric science, climatology, GIS & Remote Sensing and other related subjects. The institute operates Karachi University Astrophysics Observatory and also has a network of various mathematics and physics laboratories located in various universities of Pakistan.

== History ==
The institute was established by Karachi University's Department of Mathematics in 1994. However, the trace of establishing such institute came in place in 1960 from Vice-Chancellor A.B.A Haleem. An astronomical observatory was initiated under the administrative supervision of the Department of Mathematics of the Karachi University. In 1994, the observatory became a part of the ISPA with Jawaid Quamar as director.

Later, after the retirement of Quamar, M. Shahid Qureshi took charge of the institute in 2002. He regularized the academic programs at ISPA and led the institute till 2010.
