= Khalique Ibrahim Khalique =

- Born: 1 February 1926; Hyderabad
- Died: 29 September 2006 (aged 80)
- Occupation: Documentary filmmaker
- Spouse: Hamra Khalique
- Children: Harris Khalique and Tariq Khalique

Khalique Ibrahim Khalique (Urdu: خلیق ابراہیم خلیق) (b. 1926 - d. 2006) was a Pakistani documentary filmmaker and writer.

== Life and works ==
Khalique was born in Hyderabad in 1926. He received his early education in Lucknow but was later sent to Lahore and graduated from Punjab University. He began his film career as a script and dialogue writer with Information Films of India, in 1945 after moving from Lahore to Mumbai. Later, he decided to settle in Karachi in 1953.

Khalique was a well-known early documentary filmmaker of Pakistan. His films were exhibited the world over including at Cannes, Paris, London, Berlin, Moscow, Leningrad, New York City and Beijing during the 1960s and '70s, and he won more than 20 prizes including merit awards at international festivals, the Tamgha-e-Imtiaz in 1969 and a Lifetime Achievement Award from Karafilm Festival in 2003. He was also a poet and writer of some merit, with a number of publications.

== Major documentary films ==
- Ghalib (Urdu)
- Pakistan Story (English) and its Urdu version Pakistan ki kahani
- Pathway to Prosperity (English) and its Urdu version Khushhali ka rasta
- One Acre of Land (English)
- The Coconut Tree (English)
- Pakistan siqafat kay ai'nay main (Urdu) and its English version Cultural Heritage of Pakistan
- Architecture (English)
- Journey through Darkness (English)
- Buddha in Stone (English)
- Quaid-i-Azam (Urdu)

(NONE OF THESE FILMS HAVE ANY DATES OR REFS GIVEN) ?

== Books ==
- Manzilein Gard Ke Manind (Memoirs)
- Ujalon Ke Khwaab (Poetry)
- Kamyab Nakam (Short Stories)
- Aurat Mard Aur Dunya (Play)
- Urdu Ghazal Ke Pachchees Saal (Literary Criticism)

(NO DATES/REFS.ISBN ETC)?
