= Urdu Dictionary Board =

Literary organization in Pakistan

- اردو لغت بورڈ
- Abbreviation: UDB
- Formation: June 14, 1958; 67 years ago
- Founder: Baba-e-Urdu Maulvi Abdul Haq
- Type: Scientific and Literary Institute
- Purpose: Editing and publication of the comprehensive Urdu dictionary
- Headquarters: Street # 18/A, Block 5 Gulshan-e-Iqbal, Karachi, Sindh, Pakistan
- Staff: 55
- Website: http://www.udb.gov.pk/
- Remarks: To serve the Urdu language worldwide

The Urdu Dictionary Board (Urdu: اردو لغت بورڈ, romanized: Urdu Lughat Board) is an academic and literary institution of Pakistan, administered by National History and Literary Heritage Division of the Ministry of Information & Broadcasting. Its objective is to edit and publish a comprehensive dictionary of the Urdu language.

== Establishment and objectives ==
On 14 June 1958, through a resolution of the then Ministry of Education, the Government of Pakistan announced the creation of an institution called "Urdu Development Board" to prepare a comprehensive dictionary of Urdu on the same standards and principles as the Oxford English Dictionary.

Urdu Dictionary Board has rare manuscripts and books. The founder of Urdu Dictionary Board, Maulvi Abdul Haq rescued many of them and brought to Karachi in trunks from the offices of Anjuman-i Taraqqi-i Urdu in Delhi. After Partition of British India in 1947, there were communal riots in Delhi and the Anjuman offices were ransacked by the rioters. The entire collection of books in the library of Urdu Dictionary Board are for reference only for researchers. In other words, this is not a lending library. Urdu Dictionary Board has plans to make some books accessible online in future. They are now accessible online as of 2017.

The Board initially had the following staff members:

- President: Mumtaz Hasan (Urdu: ممتاز حسن), former Secretary in the Ministry of Finance as well as former governor of the State Bank of Pakistan;
- Vice President: Shaista Ikramullah, former representative at the Constituent Assembly of Pakistan and the country's delegate to the United Nations;
- Honorary Director General: Abdul Haq, linguist and scholar of Urdu language;
- Honorary Trustee: Abdul Hafeez Kardar, politician and former professional cricketer;
- Josh Malihabadi, Urdu poet;
- Hassam-ud-Din Rashidi, historian and journalist;
- Shan-ul-Haq Haqqee, linguist and literary critic;
- Abul Lais Siddiqui, Urdu writer and linguist;
- Syed Abdullah (Urdu: ڈاکٹر سید عبد اللہ);
- Muhammad Shabbirullah (Urdu: ڈاکٹر محمد شبیر اللہ);
- Raziq Al Khairy (Urdu: رازق الخیری)
- G. Allana

On March 27, 1982, the institution's name was changed to Urdu Dictionary Board.

== Operations ==
In 1960, the Board started publishing a quarterly magazine called Urdu Namah (Urdu: اردو نامہ) under the editorship of Shan-ul-Haq Haqqee. From then on to 1977, a total of 54 issues were released.

In 1977, the Board published the first edition of Urdu Lughat, a 22-volume comprehensive dictionary of the Urdu language. The dictionary had 20,000 pages, including 220,000 words.

In 2009, Pakistani feminist poet Fahmida Riaz was appointed as the Chief Editor of the Board.

In 2010, the Board published one last edition of the Urdu Lughat (Urdu Dictionary).

In 2016, Aqeel Abbas Jafari was appointed as the Chief Editor of the Board.

In 2017, the digital version of Urdu Lughat was released. Urdu Dictionary is now available online.

Since 2019, the Board was not assigned another Chief Editor, and 37 out of the total 55 staff seats were vacant due to lack of funding.

The dictionary is available on institution's website, but there have been instances where the website has not worked properly, with link remaining down and info on website being old.
