= Jamil Jalibi =

Pakistani scholar and linguist (1929–2019)

Jameel Jalibi
- محمد جمیل خان
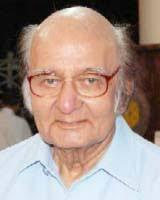
- Jameel Jalibi
- Born: 12 June 1929; Aligarh, British India
- Died: 18 April 2019 (aged 89); Karachi, Pakistan
- Known for: Urdu literature and Linguistics
- Awards: Sitara-e-Imtiaz; Hilal-e-Imtiaz (1994); Nishan-i-Imtiaz (2021); Baba-i-Urdu Maulvi Abdul Haq Award (2006)

Academic background
- Education: University of Karachi
- Doctoral advisor: Ghulam Mustafa Khan

Notes
- Former vice-chancellor of University of Karachi

Jameel Jalibi (Urdu: جمیل جالبی; 12 June 1929 – 18 April 2019) was a noted linguist, critic, writer, and scholar of Urdu literature and linguistics from Pakistan. He also was a former vice-chancellor of the University of Karachi.

== Early life ==
Jameel Jalibi was born Mohammad Jameel Khan on 12 June 1929 in a Yusufzai family of Aligarh, British India. His early schooling was in Aligarh. He matriculated in Saharanpur and did his Bachelor of Arts from Meerut College. One day before the partition of India, on 13 August 1947, Jalibi migrated to Karachi, Pakistan, where he continued his education and literary activities. He received Master of Arts in English (1949), Bachelor of Laws (1950), Ph.D. (1971), and DLitt (1973) from Sindh University.

Between 1950 and 1953 he served as headmaster at Bahadur Yar Jang School, Karachi.

In 1953, he passed Central Superior Services exams and joined Pakistan's Income Tax Department until his retirement.

== Career and literary work ==
In 1949, Jalibi worked as assistant editor for about six months for Payam-i-Mashriq, an Urdu weekly published in Karachi. From 1950 to 1954, he served as co-editor of Urdu monthly Saqi and wrote a monthly column Baatein. He also started a quarterly magazine, Naya Daur.

He performed extensive research on the history of Urdu literature from the 15th to 20th centuries and penned five chronicle volumes with the title Tareekh-e-Adab-e-Urdu.

In 1983, Jalibi became vice-chancellor of Karachi University, where he served until 1987. Then he joined the Muqtadara Quami Zaban (National Language Authority) as its chairman.

Jalibi authored over 40 books on literary criticism, research and culture. He also wrote short stories for children.

== Awards and recognition ==
- Hilal-e-Imtiaz (Crescent of Distinction) Award in 1994 by the President of Pakistan
- Sitara-e-Imtiaz (Star of Distinction) Award by the President of Pakistan
- Baba-i-Urdu Maulvi Abdul Haq Award (National Literary Award) given by Pakistan Academy of Letters in 2006.
- Nishan-e-Imtiaz (Order of Excellence) by the President of Pakistan in 2021

Pakistan Academy of Letters published a special number on his literary achievements Dr Jameel Jalibi: Shakhsiat aur Fun.

The Chief Minister of Sindh inaugurated Dr Jameel Jalibi Research Library on 14 August 2021 and also announced Dr Jameel Jalibi Chair at the University of Karachi in recognition of Jalibi's contribution to the Urdu language.

== Death ==
He died on 18 April 2019 in Karachi, Pakistan. Among his survivors are his four children – two daughters and two sons.

== Publications ==
- Pakistani Culture
- Tanqeed aur Tajarba (Criticism and Experience)
- Nai Tanqeed (New Criticism)
- Adab, Culture aur Masa'el (Literature, Culture and Problems)
- Muhammad Taqi Meer
- Noon Meem Rashid: aik mutal’a (1986)
- Maasir-e-Adab (Contemporaries Of Literature)
- Quami Zaban (National Language)
- Yak-Jehti Nafaz aur Masa'el (Solidarity Of Self and Problems)
- Masnavi Kadam Rao aur Pidam Rao
- Diwan-e-Hasan Shauqi (Collection of Hasan Sahuqi's Poetry)
- Farhang-e-Istalahaat (Dictionary of Terms)
- Qadeem Urdu Lughat (Ancient Urdu Dictionary)
- Tareekh-e-Adab-e-Urdu (History of Urdu Literature)
- Diwan-e-Nusrati (Collection of Nusrati's Poetry)
- Elliot ke Mazameen (Essays of Elliot)
- Pakistan: The Identity Of Culture
- Janwarsitan (Animal Land)
- Arastoo Se Elliot Tak (From Aristotle to Elliot)
- Adabi Tehqique
- Qaumi English-Urdu Dictionary (1995)
- Tareekh-e-Adab-e-Urdu Vol 1-5 (History of Urdu Language and Literature)
