= Pakistan Chronicle =

2010 book about the history of Pakistan

- Author: Aqeel Abbas Jafari
- Cover artist: Barkat Ali
- Language: Urdu
- Subject: History of Pakistan
- Genre: Chronicle
- Publisher: Virsa; Fazli Sons
- Publication date: April 2010
- Publication place: Pakistan
- Media type: Print (hardcover)
- Pages: 1080 pp (first edition)
- ISBN: 978-969-9454-00-4

Pakistan Chronicle is a chronicle on the history of Pakistan edited by Aqeel Jafri and first published in 2010. The most recent edition covers the history of the country from 1947 to 2018 and contains more than 5,000 events and 4,000 pictures related to politics, literature, media, fine arts, sports, and entertainment.
