= Abul Lais Siddiqui =

Pakistani scholar (1916–1994)

- Born: 15 June 1916; Agra, British India
- Died: 7 September 1994 (aged 78); Karachi, Pakistan
- Education: Aligarh Muslim University
- Scientific career
- Fields: Urdu literature and linguistics
- Workplaces: University of Karachi
- Doctoral advisor: Rasheed Ahmed Siddiqui
- Doctoral students: Aslam Farrukhi, Abul Khair Kashfi, Farman Fatehpuri, Moinuddin Aqeel

Abul Lais Siddiqui (Urdu: ابو اللیث صدیقی) (15 June 1916 – 7 September 1994) was a Pakistani author, researcher, critic, linguist and scholar of Urdu literature and linguistics.

== Career ==
He remained associated with the University of Karachi as professor and chairman, Department of Urdu. After retirement, he devoted his time to writing, guiding research, public speaking and media appearances. Siddiqui headed as Chief Editor the Urdu Dictionary Board from 1962 to 1984. During his tenure, Urdu Dictionary Board published the first six of its 22 volumes.

== Education ==
He earned his M.A. and Ph.D degrees in Urdu from the Aligarh Muslim University. After migrating to Pakistan from India, he later went to London School of Oriental Studies and Columbia University for higher education in linguistics. Siddiqui returned to Pakistan and first taught at University of the Punjab, Lahore and later at University of Karachi where he served as chairman of Urdu department for nearly 20 years and was promoted to the status of professor emeritus. He also supervised over 50 PhD dissertations at University of Karachi.

== Books ==
He had a vast collection of critical and literary writing to his credit, including over 20 books:

- Raft-O-Bood (Future and Present) - an autobiography of Abul Lais Siddiqui with introduction by Moinuddin Aqeel, published by Idara-i-yadgar-i-Ghalib, Karachi
- Aaj Ka Urdu Adab
- Iqbal Aur Maslak-e-Tasawwuf
- Urdu Ki Adabi Tareekh Ka Khaka
