= Aqeel Abbas Jafari =

Pakistani researcher and poet

Aqeel Abbas Jafri
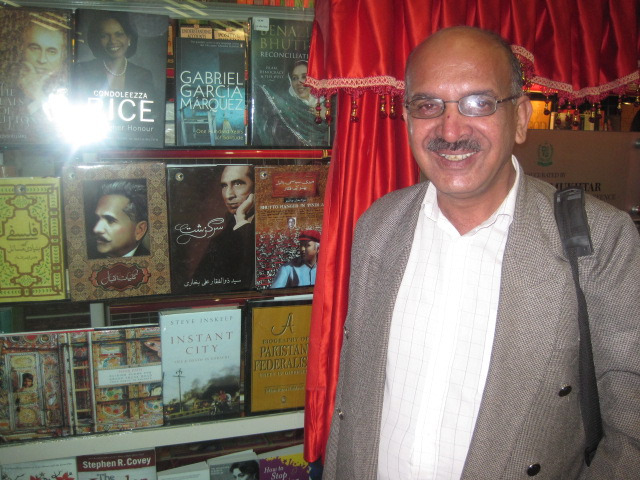
- Jafri in 2012
- Born: August 10, 1957 (age 69); Karachi, Sindh, Pakistan
- Education: Master of Arts degree (Journalism)
- Occupations: Journalist, writer
- Relatives: Wazir Hasan Jafri (father)
- Writing career
- Language: Urdu
- Notable work: Pakistan Chronicle
- Notable awards: Tamgha-i-Imtiaz (Medal of Excellence) Award by the Government of Pakistan in 2024
- Movement: Halqa-e Arbab-e Zauq

Aqeel Abbas Jafri (Urdu: عقیل عباس جعفری) (born 10 August 1957), is a Pakistani writer, poet, architect and chief editor of Urdu Dictionary Board in Pakistan.

== Works ==
Jafri spent 20 years compiling and writing Pakistan Chronicle, which was published in 2010. The book has rare photographs and accounts of historic events from August 14, 1947 (Independence Day of Pakistan) to March 31, 2010. This 1,080-page book, with over 4,000 pictures, reads like a fact-sheet on Pakistani events. According to a major newspaper of Pakistan, "A brief history of Pakistan unreels itself before the readers' eyes in the shape of brief, crisp and authentic accounts taken from leading newspapers of the country... It is a peep on Pakistan's hall of fame and hall of shame".

== Awards and recognition ==
- Tamgha-i-Imtiaz (Medal of Excellence) for his services to Pakistan by the Government of Pakistan in 2024.
