= Aslam Farrukhi =

Pakistani writer

Aslam Farrukhi اسلم فرخی
- Born: 23 October 1923; Lucknow, British India
- Died: 15 June 2016 (aged 92); Gulshan e Iqbal, Karachi
- Occupations: author, literary critic
- Spouse: Taj Begum Farrukhi
- Children: Asif Farrukhi
- Awards: Pride of Performance Award in 2009 by the President of Pakistan; Adamjee Literary Award in 1965

Aslam Farrukhi (Urdu: اسلم فرخی) (23 October 1923 – 15 June 2016) was an Urdu author, literary critic, linguist, scholar, and radio scriptwriter from Pakistan. He is also known for writing children's books. He remained associated as a professor and chairman with the Department of Urdu, University of Karachi, for many years.

== Early life ==
Aslam Farrukhi was born on 23 October 1923 into a literary family of Lucknow, British India. His ancestors had come to Lucknow from the nearby town of Farrukhabad, hence the family name, Farrukhi. After the independence of Pakistan in 1947, he migrated with his family to Karachi, Pakistan in September 1947.

He completed his education at the then Federal Urdu College, now known as Federal Urdu University and the University of Karachi. His PhD degree thesis was on the 19th century writer Muhammad Husain Azad which won the Adamjee Literary Award in 1965.

== Career ==
He started out his career at Radio Pakistan as a scriptwriter for radio plays. Later Aslam Farrukhi taught at Sindh Muslim College, now known as Sindh Madressatul Islam University and at Karachi University, where he also served as registrar. His son is scholar Asif Farrukhi, who was also a co-founder of Karachi Literature Festival. He was associated as professor and retired as chairman with the Department of Urdu, University of Karachi, after serving for many years, and with Radio Pakistan for more than six years. He was among the country's few writers of children's literature.

== Awards and recognition ==
- Pride of Performance Award by the President of Pakistan in 2009.
- Adamjee Literary Award in 1965

== Death ==
Aslam Farrukhi died on 15 June 2016, in Gulshan e Iqbal, Karachi and was buried in Karachi University Graveyard on 16 June 2016, after Zohar Prayer. Among the survivors are his wife and two sons.

== Bibliography ==
- Muhammad Hussain Azad: Hayat-o-Tasaneef - Life and Writings of the 19th century author Muhammad Husain Azad
- Guldasta-e-Ahbab
- Aangann main Sitaray
- Farid-o-Fard-i-Fareed - a book on the life of 13th century Sufi Baba Fariduddin Ganjshakar
- Dabistan-e-Nizam (Publisher:Pakistan Writers Cooperative Society)
- Bachon Ke Sultanjee - a book on the works of 13th century Sufi Khwaja Nizamuddin Auliya who were also lovingly nicknamed 'Sultanjee'
- Bachon ke Ranga Rung Amir Khusraw
- Urdu Ki Pehli Kitab for children
- Mausam-i-Bahar Jaisay Log
- Saat Asman
- Lal, Sabz Kabootar
- Raunaq-i-Bazm-i-Jahan

== See also ==
- List of Pakistani poets
- List of Pakistani writers
