= Abul Khair Kashfi =

Pakistani linguist, poet, teacher (1932–2008)

Abul Khair Kashfi (1932-2008)
- Born: 19 February 1932; Kanpur, British India
- Died: 15 May 2008 (aged 76); Karachi, Pakistan
- Education: University of Karachi, Columbia University, New York
- Scientific career
- Fields: Urdu literature and linguistics
- Workplaces: University of Karachi
- Doctoral advisor: Abul Lais Siddiqui

Muhammad Abul Khair Kashfi (Urdu: سید محمد ابو الخیر کشفی) was a Pakistani author, researcher, critic, linguist and scholar of Urdu literature and linguistics.

== Career ==
He remained associated with the University of Karachi as professor and chairman of the Department of Urdu from 1958 to 1994. He was also a visiting professor at the Osaka University of Foreign Studies, Japan. After retirement Kashfi devoted his time to writing, guiding research, public speaking and media appearances.

== Education ==
Kashfi earned M.A. and Ph.D degrees in Urdu from the University of Karachi in 1952 and 1971 respectively. The title of his doctoral dissertation was "The Historical and Political background of Urdu Poetry from 1707 to 1857 A.C." He also earned a master's degree in Teaching of English as a Second Language from Teachers' College, Columbia University, in 1968.

== Books ==
His publications include:

- Hayat-e-Muhammadi: Quran-e-Majeed Ke Aaine Mayn ("The Life of Muhammad in the Mirror of the Qur’an"), Dada Bhai Foundation, Karachi.
- Urdu Sha’iri Ka Siyasi Aur Tarikhi Pasmanzar ("The Political and Historical Background of Urdu Poetry"), Adabi Publishers, Karachi.
- Hamare Ahed Ka Adab Aur Adeeb, Qamar Kitab Ghar, Karachi.
- Jadeed Urdu Adab Ke Do Tanqeedi Jaezay ("Two Critical Studies of Modern Urdu Literarture"), Urdu Academy Sind, Karachi.
- Hamare Adabi Aur Lisani Masail ("Our Literary and Linguistic Problems"), Majlis-e-Matbuaat-o-Tahqiqaat-e-Urdu, Karachi.
- Yeh Log Bhi Ghazab Thay, Feroze Sons Lahore.
- Ghalib Ki Cheh Ghazlen ("Six Ghazals of Ghalib"), Urdu Academy Sindh, Karachi.
- Maulana Room (R.A) Aur Unki Kahaniyan (Tales of Maulana Room), Majlis e Nashariat e Islam

== Awards ==
- Dawood Literary Award (1975), awarded for his book Urdu Sha’iri Ka Siyasi Aur Tarikhi Pasmanzar.
- National Seerat Award (1991), awarded for his book Hayat-e-Muhammadi - Quran-e-Majeed Ke Aaine Mayn by the Government of Pakistan
- Nishan-e-Azmat Award (1991)
- Quaid-e-Azam Adbi Award (1993)
