= Moinuddin Aqeel =

Pakistani writer, scholar (born 1946)

- Born: 25 June 1946 (age 80)
- Education: University of Karachi
- Known for: Urdu literature
- Scientific career
- Fields: Urdu literature
- Workplaces: University of Karachi
- Doctoral advisor: Abul Lais Siddiqui

Moinuddin Aqeel (Urdu: معین الدین عقیل) (born 25 June 1946) is a Pakistani author, critic, and scholar of Urdu literature.

== Early life and education ==
Aqeel was born in British India in 1946 and after the partition, came to Pakistan. He obtained his M.A. in 1969, PhD on The Role of Urdu in the Freedom Movement in 1975, and DLitt in 2003, all from the University of Karachi.

== Academic career ==
Aqeel was a professor and chair of the Urdu department at the University of Karachi. During his tenure at the University of Karachi, he also held several key positions, including director of the Bureau of Composition, Compilation and Translation from 2002 to July 2003, and director of the Evening Programme from July 2003 to January 2004. Additionally, he has been the head examiner for Urdu at the International Baccalaureate Organisation in Cardiff, UK, since 2001. He retired from the University of Karachi in 2006.

Aqeel has taught Urdu at the Tokyo University of Foreign Studies in Japan and the University of Oriental Studies in Naples, Italy. He has lectured on Pakistan's culture and history at Daito Bunka University, Saitama, Japan. Currently, he is the dean of the Faculty of Languages and Literature and has served as chair of the Department of Urdu at the International Islamic University, Islamabad.

=== Awards and recognition ===
Aqeel has been recognized for his contributions to education and literature with awards such as the Best Teacher award from Allama Iqbal Open University in 1989 and the Ba Ba-e-Urdu Gold Medal in 1969.

=== Academic impact ===
Aqeel has supervised many students for their M.Phil. and PhD degrees. His work has been the subject of study in several academic theses:

- MPhil, Farhat Sultana, Urdu Services of Prof. Moinuddin Aqeel, Osmania University, Deccan, India, 2003.
- M.A., Shumaila Fareed, Educational and Literary Services of Dr. Moinuddin Aqeel, University of Sindh, Jamshoro, Pakistan, 1997.
- M.A., Saima Rani, Standing of Dr. Moinuddin Aqeel in Urdu Research and Critique, Bahauddin Zakaria University, Multan, Pakistan, 2003.

== Publications ==
Aqeel has written 37 books and over 200 research articles, reviews, and prefaces. Some of his notable books include:

- Tazkirah Ulma-e-Sitapur (2006)
- Resurgence of Muslim Separatism in British India: A selection of unpublished correspondence between Jinnah and Mir Ghulam Bhik Nairang (2001)
- Pakistani Adab; Masail aur Manazir (1999)
- Saqoot-e-Hyderabad (1998)
- Pakistan Mein Urdu Adab (1996)
- Ishtiaq Hussain Qureshi; Kitabiyat (1987)
- Tehreek-e-Azadi Mein Urdu Ka Hissa (1972)
