= Farman Fatehpuri =

Pakistani Urdu linguist, researcher and writer (1926–2013)

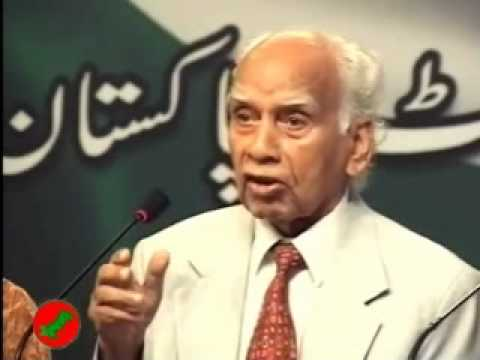
- Farman Fatehpuri in 2013
- Born: Syed Dildar Ali; 26 January 1926; Fatehpur, United Provinces, British India
- Died: 3 August 2013 (aged 87); Karachi
- Citizenship: Pakistani
- Education: University of Karachi
- Known for: Work on Mirza Ghalib
- Awards: Sitara-i-Imtiaz (Star of Excellence) Award by the President of Pakistan in 1985
- Scientific career
- Fields: Urdu literature and Linguistics

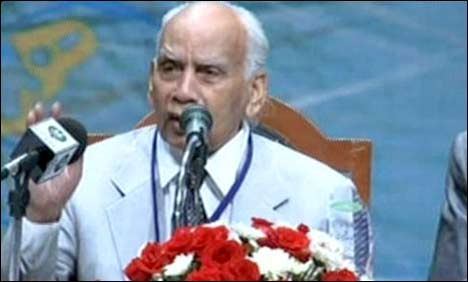
Farman Fatehpuri addresses a global conference in 2013

Farman Fatehpuri (Urdu: فرمان فتح پوری) (born Syed Dildar Ali (Urdu: سید دلدار علی), 26 January 1926 – 3 August 2013) was an Urdu linguist, researcher, writer, critic and scholar of Pakistan.

He is widely regarded as a leading authority on the life and work of Ghalib. He wrote many scholarly articles, book reviews, and editorials about Ghalib.

== Awards and recognition ==
- In 1985, he received the Sitara-e-Imtiaz (Star of Excellence) Award for his literary accomplishments from the President of Pakistan.
- Professor Emeritus at the University of Karachi.

== Biography ==
Fatehpuri was born on 26 January 1926 in the Fatehpur, Uttar Pradesh, India. His father died in 1933 while he was still a child. He received his matriculation from Fatehpur and intermediate education (high school) from Allahabad in 1948. He graduated from Agra University in 1950. Farman migrated to Pakistan in 1950 and settled in Karachi. He completed his Master of Arts, LLB and B.T. from Karachi University. In 1965, he obtained his PhD degree.

He also received a D.Litt (Doctor of Letters) degree in Urdu in 1974. He remained associated with Karachi University for 30 years as a faculty and later he was named Professor Emeritus i.e. Professor for life by the University of Karachi in recognition of his lifelong academic service. He was appointed chief editor and secretary of the Urdu Dictionary Board in 1985.

From the mid-1980s onward, during his service as chief editor and later president of the Urdu Dictionary Board in Karachi, he helped publish multiple volumes of the comprehensive Urdu Lughat (dictionary), strengthening its scholarly foundation.

From 1996 on, he served as a member of the Civil Services Board of the Sindh Government. He became the editor of the monthly publication, Nigar which is the oldest Urdu literary journal, founded by Farman's mentor, Allama Niaz Fatehpuri.

== Death ==
He died on 3 August 2013 (24th Ramadan). His final rites were offered on 4 August 2013, and he was buried in the Karachi University graveyard

== Personal life ==
He was survived by his wife Salma Begum and six children; two sons and four daughters.

His daughters include Dr. Shamim Salman, a prominent physician in New York and President of the New York Chapter of APPNA (Association of Physicians of Pakistani Descent of North America). She also serves as President of the Dr. Farman Fatehpuri Academy. Other daughters are Dr. Najma Hashmi, a retired professor from Karachi; Dr. Waseem Salahuddin, a retired physician from the Sindh Government; and Dr. Uzma Farman, the youngest daughter, who is a Professor and Head of the Department of Urdu at Karachi University..

== Literary works ==
Farman's works and ideas have had a strong influence on researchers investigating the poetry and prose of Ghalib and Urdu linguistics. He was the author of more than 60 titles on the Urdu poetry of Ghalib and Allama Iqbal, including linguistics, critique, and biography. His interpretations of Ghalib’s poetry and Urdu linguistic frameworks are frequently referenced in doctoral dissertations and scholarly critiques. His analyses are considered foundational in many university curricula.He contributed significantly to Urdu linguistics, literary theory and literary journalism. His works are frequently referenced by researchers exploring Urdu poetics, prosody (aruz), and narrative forms.

Among his notable contributions was his work on Rubai poetry, the study of Manzoom Dastaan, and the canon of Naat poetry fields that had previously received limited systematic scholarly attention. Fatehpuri’s explorations into Tazkirah tradition (biographical literary history) provided critical frameworks for understanding how poets and their works were historically documented and evaluated. His bibliography reflects his leadership in multiple areas of Urdu literature. One of his essays, غالب کی شاعری میں استفہام (On the Interrogative in Ghalib’s Poetry), became a catalyst for debate and further study among Urdu scholars, including discourse with critics like Shams Ur Rahman Farooqi. This work helped foreground nuanced rhetorical dimensions in Ghalib’s verse and contributed to broader hermeneutic approaches in Urdu literary criticism.

== Intellectual Influence ==
While his intellectual contributions are widely recognized, Farman Fatehpuri’s personality also shaped his influence. As an educator, he was known for his charismatic presence, ability to inspire critical thinking, and deep influence on generations of students and researchers. Contemporary accounts describe him as a teacher whose enthusiasm for Urdu literature fueled rigorous scholarly inquiry.

== Legacy and Enduring Significance ==
Farman Fatehpuri’s body of work remains essential in the history of Urdu criticism, research, linguistics, lexicography, and literary journalism. By addressing genres and traditions that were previously marginalized or under‑studied, he broadened the scope of Urdu literary scholarship. His insistence on methodological clarity and cultural rootedness helped shape critical practice in Urdu studies across South Asia and the diaspora.

== Research Opportunities ==
Farman Fatehpuri’s literary output extends beyond his published books and essays. He left behind numerous essays, letters, personal notes, and unpublished materials, many of which remain scattered across private archives, libraries, and institutional collections. These materials, including correspondence with contemporaneous scholars, flaps from literary journals, and lecture notes, represent a rich but largely untapped resource for researchers. Comprehensive compilation and analysis of these documents are awaited, offering significant potential to deepen understanding of Urdu literary history and criticism.

== Bibliography ==
- Urdu Rubaee
- Tadrees-e-Urdu
- Urdu ki Manzoom Dastaan
- Tehqeeq-o-Tanqeed
- Naya aur Purana Adab
- Nawab Mirza Shauq Ki Masnavian
- Qamar Zamani Begum
- Zaban aur Urdu Zaban
- Urdu Imla aur Rasmulkhat
- Urdu ki Naatia Shaeeri
- Taweel-o-Tadbeer
- Iqbal sab kay leay
- Fun-e-Taarikh goi
- Urdu Shura kay Tazkaray aur Tazkara Nigari (biographies of Urdu poets)
- Mir Anees – Hayat aur Shaeeri
- Irghaman-e-Gokal Parshad
- Ghalib – Shaer-e-Imroz-o-Farda
- Darya-e-Ishq aur Behr-ul-Mohabbat ka Taqabuli Mutaalea
- Urdu Afsana aur Afsana Nigari
- Hindi-Urdu Tanazea
- Niaz Fatehpuri – Deeda Shuneeda
- Aurat aur Funoon Latifa
- Ghazaleyat-e-Ghalib – Sharah-o-Matan
- Bila Jawaz (biography)
- Urdu Shaeeri aur Pakistani Maashra
- Urdu Fiction Ki Mukhtasar Tareekh

== See also ==
- List of Pakistani writers
- List of Urdu language writers
