= Shaukat Aziz =

Pakistani banker and politician (born 1949)

- شوکت عزیز
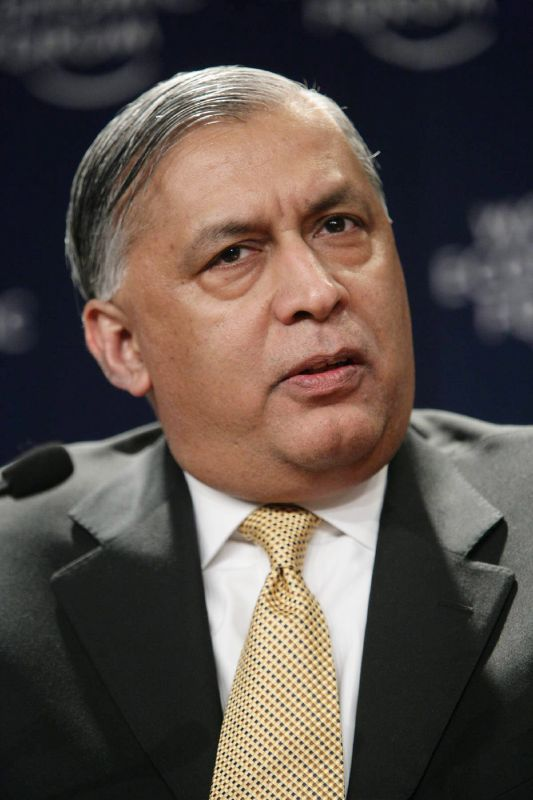
- Aziz in 2007

15th Prime Minister of Pakistan
- In office 28 August 2004 – 15 November 2007
- President: Pervez Musharraf
- Preceded by: Chaudhry Shujaat Hussain
- Succeeded by: Muhammad Mian Soomro (caretaker)

Minister of Finance
- In office 6 November 1999 – 15 November 2007
- Prime Minister: Zafarullah Khan Jamali; Chaudhry Shujaat Hussain; Himself
- Preceded by: Ishaq Dar
- Succeeded by: Salman Shah (caretaker)

Member of the National Assembly of Pakistan
- In office 20 August 2004 – 15 November 2007
- Preceded by: Eman Waseem
- Succeeded by: Sardar Saleem Haider Khan
- Constituency: NA-59 (Attock-III)

Personal details
- Born: Shaukat Abdul Aziz; 6 March 1949 (age 77) Karachi, Federal Capital Territory, Pakistan
- Other political affiliations: PML(Q) (2002–2007)
- Spouse: Rukhsana Aziz
- Education: Gordon College; IBA Karachi

Shaukat Aziz (Note: Urdu: شوکت عزیز) (born 6 March 1949) is a Pakistani-born British former banker who served as the 15th prime minister of Pakistan from 28 August 2004 to 15 November 2007. When his term as Prime Minister was over, he immediately left Pakistan and settled in the United Kingdom. Previously, he served as the finance minister of Pakistan from 6 November 1999 to 15 November 2007.

Aziz was born in Karachi. He graduated from the Institute of Business Administration and later joined the corporate staff of the CitiBank Pakistan in 1969. He initially served as CitiBank financier, and became executive vice-president of Citibank in 1999.

In 1999, Aziz entered politics on the personal request of Pervez Musharraf and moved to Pakistan from the United States to assume charge of the Finance Ministry as the finance minister. In 2004, Aziz was nominated by Musharraf as his prime minister after taking resignation from Zafarullah Khan Jamali on 6 June 2004.

== Early life and education ==
Shaukat Aziz was born in Karachi, Pakistan, on 6 March 1949. He studied at Saint Patrick's School, Karachi and Abbottabad Public School, Abbottabad, Pakistan. His father, S.A. Aziz (sometimes Abdul Aziz) was a radio engineer employed in the state-owned Pakistan Broadcasting Corporation (PBC) as chief engineer.

The PBC moved his family to Abbottabad, North West Frontier Province where he attended the Abbottabad Public School. Later, the family moved back to Karachi. Aziz matriculated and obtained high-school diploma from Saint Patrick's High School and proceeded to Government College now GCU In Lahore where he passed his inter-level and ascended to attend the Gordon College of Rawalpindi, Punjab province in 1965. Aziz obtained a BS degree in Economics in 1967 from Gordan College and moved back to Karachi the same year to enroll in a master's programme. Aziz attended the master's programme of the Institute of Business Administration (IBA) in Karachi and obtained MBA in business administration in 1969.

== Banking career ==
Initially, Aziz joined the corporate branch of Citibank Pakistan as its credit officer in 1969. During his career, Aziz subsequently served in various countries including Pakistan, Greece, United States, United Kingdom, Malaysia, Philippines, Jordan, Saudi Arabia and Singapore.

When a multinational corporation wants to enter emerging markets, it call its lawyers, its accountants, its embassy...and of course, Citibank...

— Aziz as the director of Asia/Pacific global finance operations, CitiBank

After arriving to assume the charge of corporate assignment in the United States, Aziz settled in New York City and took over the office operations of Citibank at the Empire State Building. Aziz acquired permanent residence status, but did not acquire American citizenship, whilst continuing to upgrade his legal status.

In the U.S., Aziz held numerous positions in Citibank across several divisions including Corporate and Investment Banking (CIB), Corporate Planning Officer (CPO), Chief Financial Officer of Citicorp and managing director of Citibank Singapore. He has been a board member of Citibank subsidiaries, including Saudi American Bank, Citicorp Islamic Bank, and of several non-profit organizations. Aziz played a pivotal role in expanding Citibank branches and corporate directive operations throughout the country and was instrumental in bringing multinational banking industries into Pakistan in the 1990s.

At Citibank, Aziz served as the corporate director of Asia Pacific global finance operations and had been notable for financing and managing funds on behalf of Citibank and other financial corporations in global stock markets. He was also involved with Citi Private Bank, a subsidiary of Citigroup. Aziz regarded his career in Citigroup as "extremely helpful" in preparing him for the executive public office, in 2006.

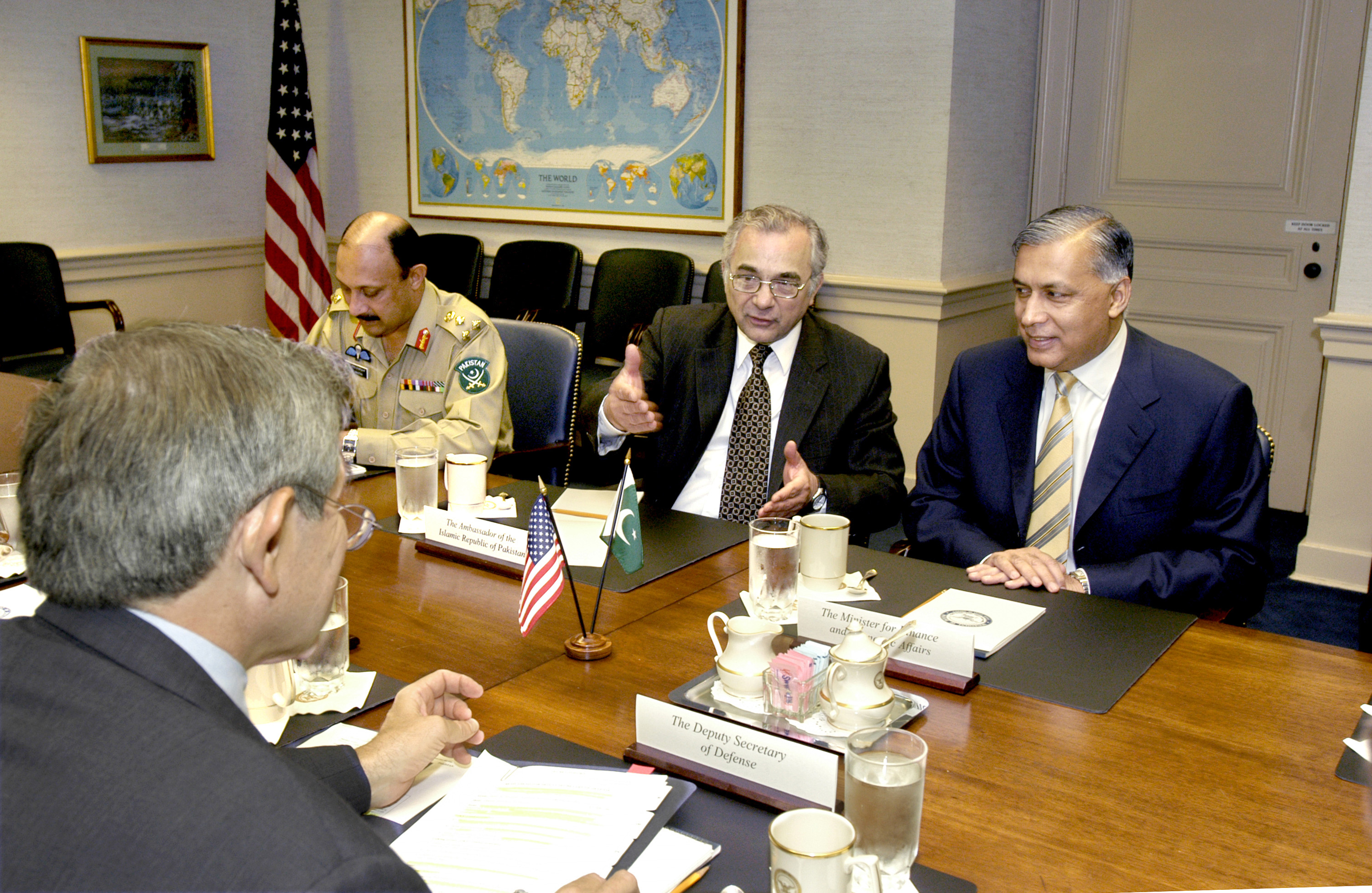
Aziz engaging in discussions with American officials.

Aziz continued to visit Pakistan, working to expand Citibank's financial services and banking, overseeing the wide expansion of Citigroup's branches and its influence in Pakistan. In the 1990s, he worked closely with the governments of Benazir Bhutto and Nawaz Sharif to help negotiate economic relief packages and aid to Pakistan, while maintaining diverse relations with Pakistan Armed Forces who would also visit the United States as part of Sharif's and Benazir Bhutto's state visits.

By the 1990s, Aziz had established many notable contacts within the United States administration. In a book, Global Financial Warrior, written by John B. Taylor, Aziz had substantial access to the US Treasury, World Bank and many other world financial institutions. Aziz worked closely with the United States in order to finance U.S. war games and operations. Aziz knew the volumes of secretive methods of transferring funds in and out of South Asia, particularly clandestine financing of nuclear weapons programmes of India and Pakistan at its most, Taylor maintained.

== Finance minister ==
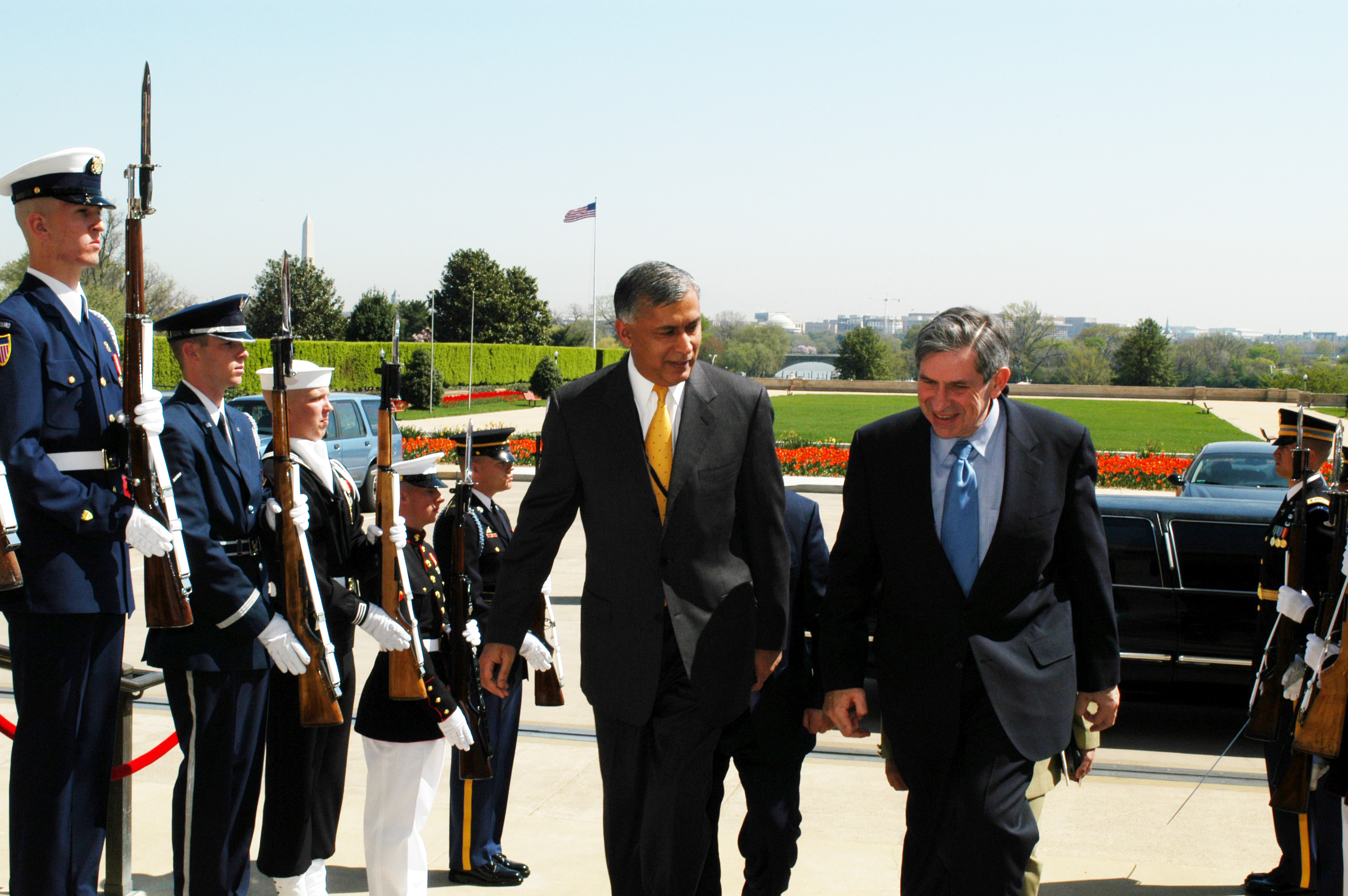
Aziz on a visit to United States

Shaukat Aziz had been a president of Citi Private Bank in New York before returning to Pakistan in 1999. Shortly, General Pervez Musharraf arrived for a small personal trip to the United States after staging a coup d'état to deposed the people-elected prime minister Navaz Sharif on 12 October 1999. After a brief session, Musharraf asked Shaukat Aziz to stand up and introduce himself to the audience.

Aziz reportedly returned with Musharraf in November 1999 and took charge of the Finance ministry as its Finance Minister. As Finance minister, all state-owned mega-corporations came under the government-ownership while restructuring each mega-corporation to set off to privatisation. During his first days, Aziz worked to control the economy in a difficult and hostile environment with then-President Muhammad Rafiq Tarar who called him "an alien", and many among those who were close to deposed prime minister Nawaz Sharif and Benazir Bhutto. Other politicians including Fazal-ur-Rehman and Ameen Faheem became hostile towards Aziz and his policies; and harboured grave doubts about him because Aziz was not like a traditional politician in the country, an accredited politician.

Initially there was a decline in the economy, and Aziz attributes this as "state (Pakistan) unpleasant relations with international financial institutions. There was a ~70% decline in the national economy with the loss of $150 million (1999) to $600 million (2000), which constituted 0.21% of foreign direct investment (FDI) global flow. Aziz took initiatives for FDI offering incentives to foreign investors with his macroeconomic policies, taxation framework and a consistent investment policy.

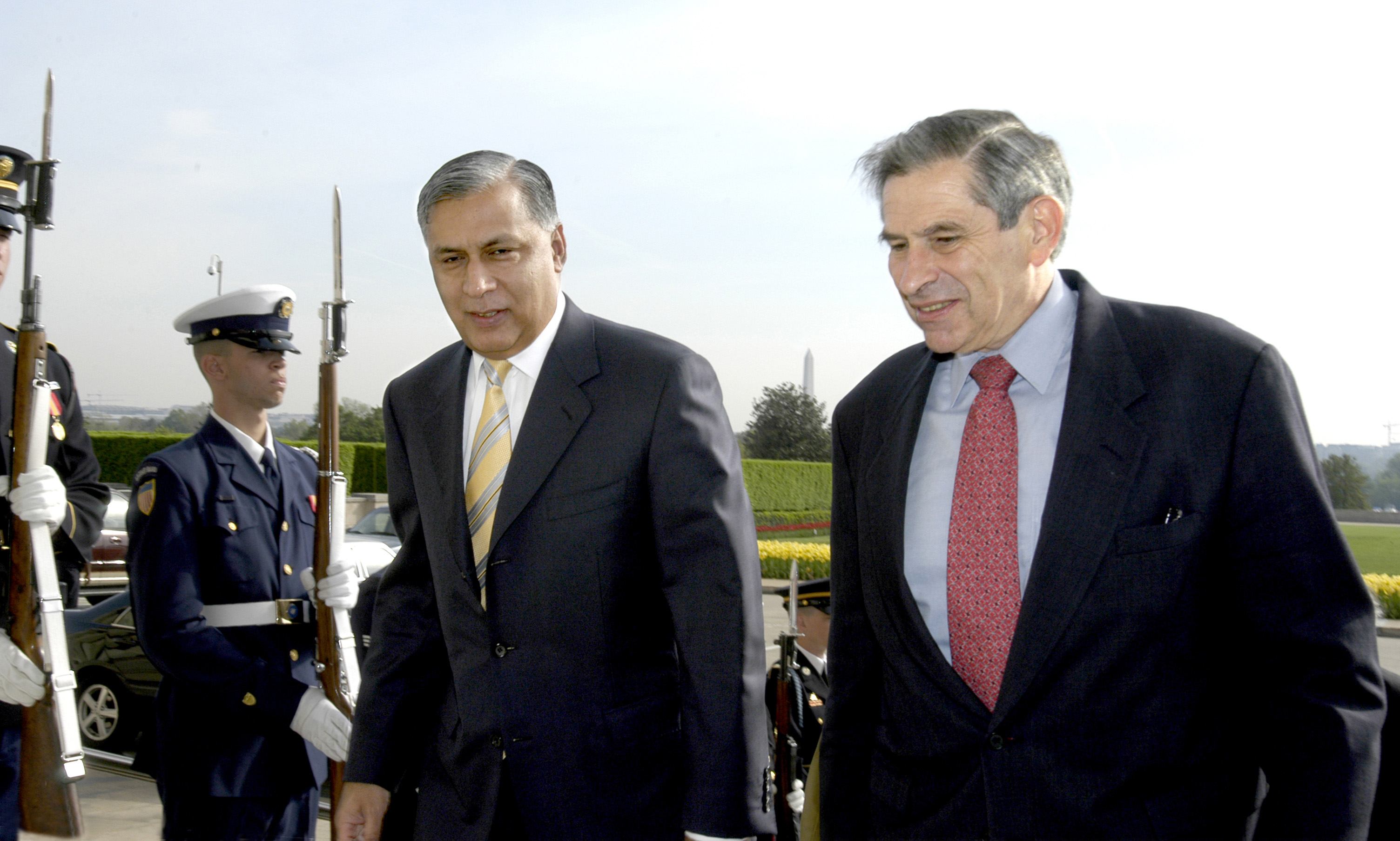
Shaukat Aziz with Paul Wolfowitz at The Pentagon, 2003.

After the 11 September attacks in the United States and Pakistan's role in the war on terror, Aziz travelled to the United States in order to negotiate a relief and U.S. aid to Pakistan. He closely worked with US Secretary of the Treasury on the detail of the devised plan on how to remove the Taliban from Afghanistan, cancellation and debt relief, loans from the World Bank, and direct support from U.S. Aid for national public development. Aziz recommended policies and new plan of economic reforms, including the improved budgetary transparency and spending controls— a plan that was widely accepted by the United States. With the help from United States Department of the Treasury, Aziz thwarted individuals, difficulties and obstacles to achieve success in his economic programmes. In 2002, Aziz worked with U.S. administration to help advise the United States to finance the war in Afghanistan. In the words of John B. Taylor, Aziz suggested that U.S. should call out for a meeting of finance ministers of the G7 member countries, where the illicit funding of money would become a great problem for G7 countries in the future. In April 2002, Aziz chaired a historical meeting on behalf of Pakistan and the United States, helping the G7 members to understand how the illicit money was transferred was shared with the finance ministers of G7 members and Pakistan on other side.

In 2001, Aziz implemented and activated the Privatisation Programme (first founded by former prime minister Nawaz Sharif in 1991) and opened all state-owned enterprises (SOEs) to private sector. This programme undertook the country into rapid economic growth and extreme level of industrialisation the country had for yet seen since 1972. After the 2002 general elections, Aziz intensified his programme and aggressively implemented economic liberalisation policies in the country. Aziz's financial policies came under surrounding controversies, creating new problems for Prime minister Zafarullah Khan Jamali to counter who was forced to resign the office in his favour. His affordable real estate scheme encouraged common men to afford a house and a vehicle on low investment. On the other hand, this scheme brought an increased violation of zoning regulations in construction companies. Although, Zafarullah Khan Jamali controlled the inflation at its low level, his deregulation policies of price control caused the oil and sugar prices to skyrocket. His public and liberalisation of economy policy expanded the political role of Supreme Court of Pakistan in a higher level of the government and to target high-level of government corruption independently without government interferences.

Pakistan's fiscal performance was praised by IMF and the World Bank. The World Bank further reiterated that Pakistan's economic growth bolstered international confidence.

=== Assassination attempt ===
While campaigning on 30 July 2004, Aziz survived an assassination attempt in the Attock District of Punjab, Pakistan. The suicide bomb attack was staged in Fateh Jang, a small town to the north of the capital, Islamabad, where Aziz was contesting an election. The attempt was made when Aziz was departing after meeting with constituents. A suicide bomber, who was travelling with the Aziz motorcade, detonated the device next to the car in which Aziz was travelling, killing himself and Aziz's chauffeur, as well as six others.

Aziz called the incident "tragic", and said it had claimed the lives of innocent people. He added that it had reinforced his resolve to serve Pakistan and the Islamic world. After safely reaching Islamabad, Aziz instigated a probe, while the foreign office contacted its mission in Egypt to try to determine the veracity of an Al Qaeda claim of responsibility. Ten suspected Al-Qaeda perpetrators were arrested in Egypt and later extradited to Pakistan for the crime.

== Premiership (2004–2007) ==
By 2004, Aziz had become a right hand of general Musharraf, as Musharraf described in his memoirs. The strong oligarch business class of Pakistan, notably Chaudhry Shujaat Hussain, had been impressed by Shaukat Aziz's performance as finance minister. Following the resignation of Mir Zafarullah Khan Jamali on 26 June 2004, Hussain nominated Aziz for the office of prime minister and was also a top choice for the candidacy of prime ministerial post by Musharraf.

However, Aziz was not a member of the National Assembly, although he was a Senator. As required by the constitution, the prime minister had to be a member of the National Assembly. Aziz was highly regarded as a "technocrat" and had gained the trust of the establishment, international institutions and public support. His nomination came after another technocrat-economist, Dr. Manmohan Singh, became the prime minister of India and Aziz was widely seen as compatible with his Indian counterpart.

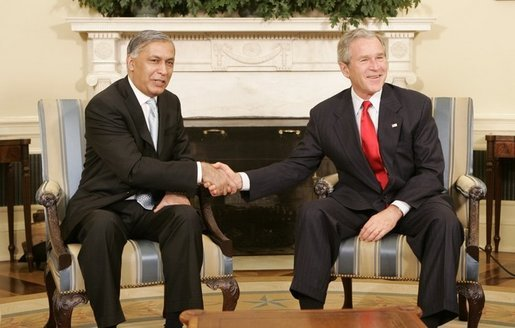
Shaukat Aziz at the White House with US president George W. Bush, 24 January 2006.

Having been described and labelled as an urban gentlemen and smartly dressed, Aziz was tasked with day-to-day running of the federal government and see that policies were more effectively executed while Musharraf handled the military issues. In Pakistan, it was also said that Musharraf blindly trusted Aziz and sometimes, Musharraf's approvals were not needed for the projects that normally required permission. Aziz quietly and more quickly undermined the elements seeking to undermine Musharraf which may have been a factor that Musharraf had blindly trusted Aziz.

The post was held by Chaudhry Shujaat Hussain while Aziz fulfilled the constitutional requirement of securing a seat in the lower house of parliament. Aziz ran from two constituencies, Tharparkar-I in Sindh, and Attock District. Even after the assassination attempt, Aziz continued campaigning and won from both constituencies. Since he could retain only one seat, he immediately vacated his Tharparkar seat, preferring to represent Attock, where he had won by 76,156 votes to 29,497.

=== Domestic reforms ===
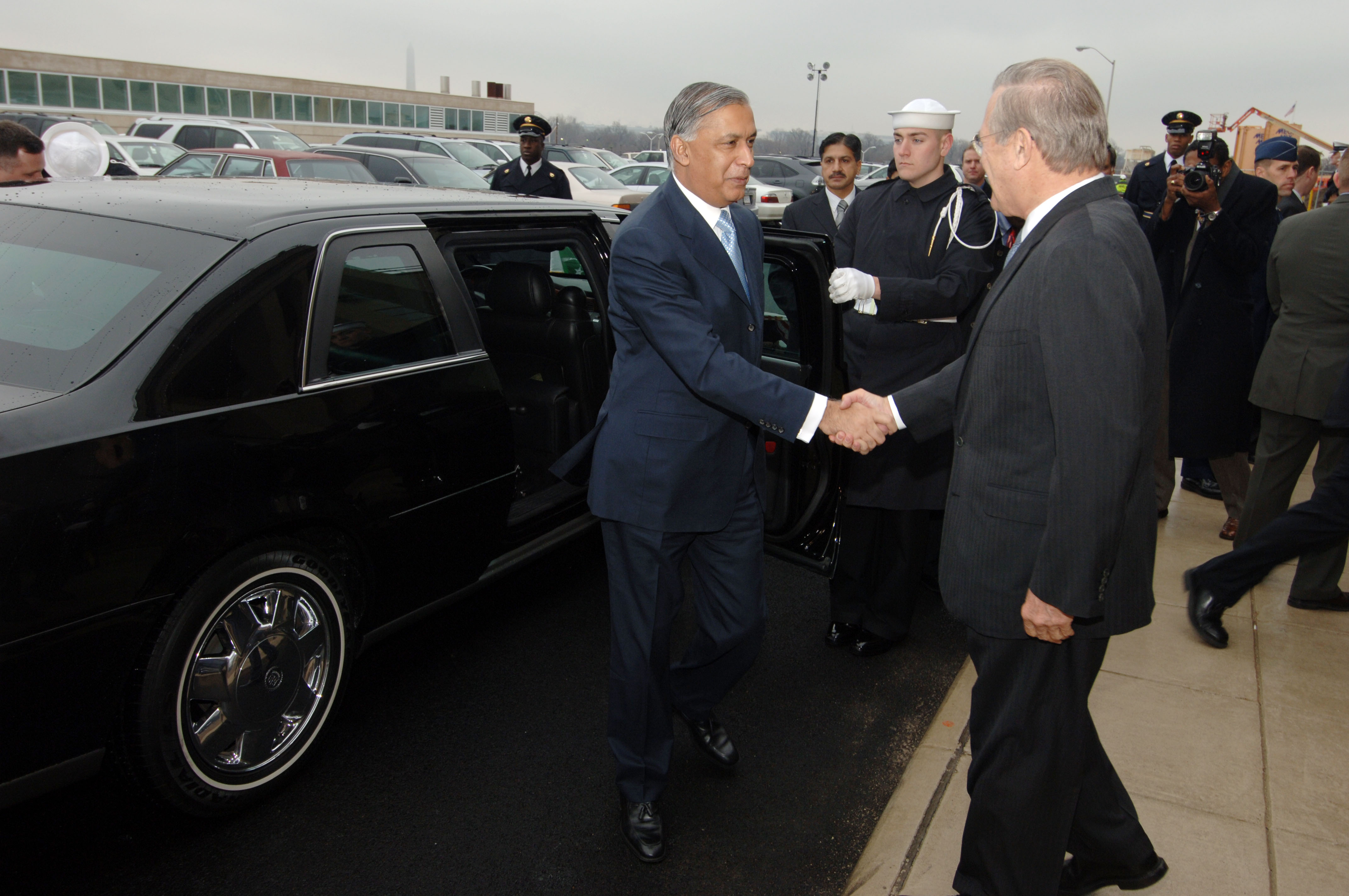
Secretary of Defense Donald H. Rumsfeld (right) greets Prime Minister Shaukat Aziz at the Pentagon.

Aziz successfully oversaw the rapid development of the local government system in Pakistan as part of his "Strengthening Decentralisation" program. His domestic initiatives including the decentralisation in the country, and termed the local government system as "more transparent and accountable". Aziz strengthened the policy formats and area of responsibility of National Reconstruction Bureau (NRB) after appointing Daniyal Aziz in 2005. In 2005, Aziz's government installed 6,000 water supply and sanitation filter plants through the Khushal Pakistan (lit. Prospered Pakistan) programme, a scheme founded by Nawaz Sharif in the 1990s. As prime minister, Aziz took hard stance against rivals and took a hardline against his political challengers. Aziz thrashed the Alliance for Restoration of Democracy (ARD) led by conservative leader Javed Hashmi who was placed in military prison on treason charges, on a support provided by Aziz. His hardline and tough counter active measures forced Pakistan Peoples Party of Benazir Bhutto and Pakistan Muslim League-N of Nawaz Sharif to concede their defeat and took asylum in United Kingdom.

In 2005, non-partisan local government elections were decided to be held in entire country, starting first to hold the elections in Karachi. Subsequently, Aziz supervised and presided the first free and fair local body elections with PML(Q) and its allied parties sweeping the election arena. Controversially, Aziz allocated Rs. 20 million to each district where PML(Q) candidates lost the National Assembly elections in order to secure its voting bank that was lost in 2002. In Sindh and Balochistan Province, Aziz presided the peaceful election held events and personally monitored the success of the local government body programme. Under his first few of years of government, the law and order situation remains under control and prosperity in Balochistan, and presided the completion the first phase of the Gwadar port.

In Islamabad alone, Aziz's government was forced to take military action, codenamed Operation Sunrise (formerly Operation Silence) after chairing a meeting with the President. In 2009, Aziz maintained that his government had tried at every level of extreme to resolve the Lal Masjid issue through talks to save lives. In a television interview, Aziz maintained that "We gave them time to leave the mosque and the Imam-e-Kaaba Abdul Rahman Al-Sudais also came to Pakistan on my request in connection with the issue.".

One of the widely reported controversy took place in his government was the atomic proliferation scandal of Abdul Qadeer Khan. Aziz remains supportive towards Khan and efficiently took matters of Abdul Qadeer Khan in 2006 from President Musharraf. On 10 September 2006, Aziz sent flowers and personally visited Khan when he was hospitalised and on 12 October 2007, Musharraf made it clear to United States and rest of the world that Khan "won't be handed over" at given any circumstances. On a television speech, Aziz paid a huge tribute to Abdul Qadeer Khan and while commenting on last part of his speech, Aziz stressed it:

The (meritorious) services of scientist Dr. Abdul Qadeer Khan are "unforgettable" for our beloved country, "Pakistan" ...

— Prime Minister Shaukat Aziz Shukat Aziz publicly supporting Abdul Qadeer Khan in 2007, source

=== Energy policy ===
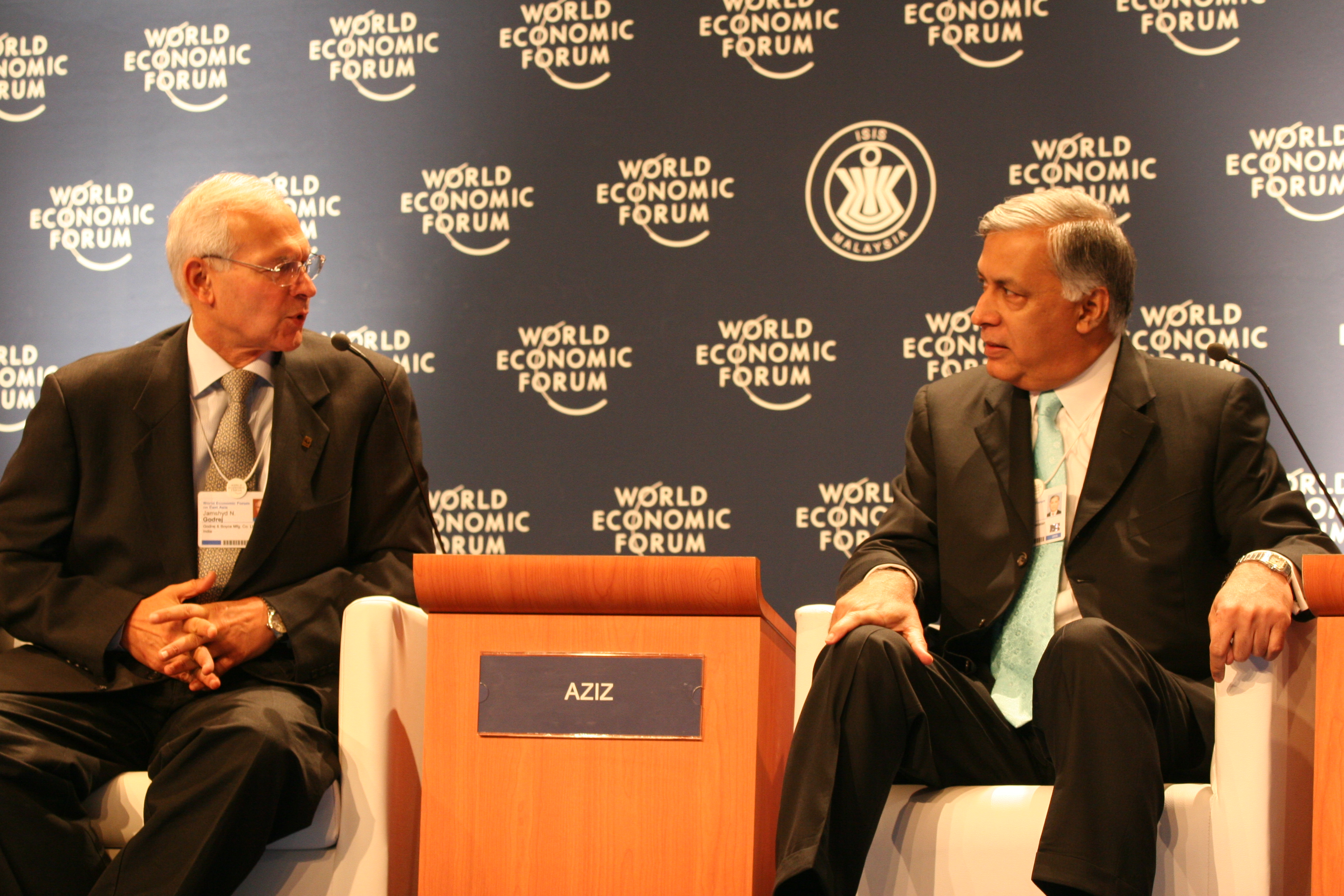
Shaukat Aziz at the World Economic Forum, 2008

After assuming the office, Aziz announced a controversial "New 25-year energy plan", aiming to raise Pakistan's dependence on imported oil for power generation to 50% by 2030. His government pushed for the renewable energy, and put efforts to establish the solar energy and wind power sector in the country.

Prime Minister Aziz's "New 25-year energy plan" remains extremely controversial and met great public criticism by media and energy experts. Energy experts rendered Aziz's programme as "bigger disaster" in a view when even oil rich Gulf countries were reducing their share of oil in their power production. Prime Minister Aziz approved the constructional, and approved the developmental work of CHASNUPP-II reactor at the Chashma Nuclear Power Plant in Chashma city, Punjab Province of Pakistan. A 325 MW commercial nuclear power plant was built with Chinese assistance at the close vicinity of Chashma nuclear power complex. Aziz termed this project as "milestone" in the history of nuclear technology in Pakistan. In 2007, Aziz approved the constructional development of KANUPP-II and the nuclear reprocessing site, the Nuclear Power Fuel Complex in Islamabad. Aziz oversaw to increase the capacity building of the Pakistan Nuclear Regulatory Authority, a governmental nuclear safety authority, to meet the safety requirement of nuclear power plants. In 2007, Aziz further diversified his nuclear energy policy, terming it as "criteria based nuclear technology" while continued financing the nuclear power projects. Aziz presided initial construction of major hydroelectric power plants project in Pakistan, such as approving the Diamer-Bhasha Dam. Its foundation was laid by his successor Yousaf Raza Gillani in 2011. In 2004, Aziz directed the Ministry of Water and Power and Planning Commission to prepare an integrated energy plan for the country. Aziz approved the "Vision 2025" programme" of Water and Power Development Authority (WAPDA) to produce power through water. The programme was intended to be launched with the help of private sector and private funding through the international megaproject. However all projects were cancelled or either put on hold by the upcoming government of Yousaf Raza Gillani due economic distress, lack of capital and investment and continuing economic declines, leading an increasing circular debt.

=== Defence policy ===
Aziz oversaw the successful development of the JF-17 Thunder fighter programme in record time, built with the close cooperation with China. In 2007, Aziz stressed that "Pakistan is not an offensive country and our defence doctrine is based on having minimum credible deterrence to maintain peace and stability in the region.". Aziz also successfully saw the technology transfer and contract development of first combatant frigate, the F-22P Zulfiquar. In May 2006, Aziz stressed that: "Pakistan's deep military and economic cooperation with China was one not based on "transient interest", but was "higher than Himalayas, deeper than oceans".

In August 2006, Aziz visited the People's Republic of China, seeking Chinese cooperation in space technology. China expressed interest in helping Pakistan with developing and launching satellites. In a joint statement of Prime Minister Shaukat Aziz and Chinese Premier Wen Jiabao, Aziz emphasised that: "both countries are determined to elevate their friendship and strategic partnership.". A contract was signed with China, Aziz authorized the development of the satellite, Paksat-IR. Aziz presided over the security, expansion, and modernization of the country's nuclear deterrence programme as part of his defence policy. Aziz oversaw the successful development of the Shaheen-II missile program and witnessed its first flight at an undisclosed location in April 2006. After witnessing the test, Aziz maintained that: "We will continue to pursue vigorously our security and energy needs from all sources including nuclear.". On 8 August 2005, Aziz issued directives to tightened the security and control and command of the National Command Authority and ordered strict monitoring of atomic assets and facilities at all levels of command.

In 2004, Aziz stated and clarified Pakistan's nuclear policy to the world and India in an interview given to the Times of India:

Pakistan's strategy of "Minimum Credible Deterrence" guarantees "peace in the region", and the nuclear weapons programme is moving "strength to strength" ...

— Prime Minister Shaukat Aziz, Times of India,

From 2005 and onwards, Aziz's government took major steps against atomic proliferation while also making several decisions to increase the capacity of nuclear deterrence and sufficient use of nuclear energy for the civil sector.

=== Foreign relations ===
On foreign fronts, Aziz closely collaborated with Musharraf while working to develop the geostrategy in the region. Aziz took initiatives to strengthen the relations with the United States, European Union, Russia, India, China, and Saudi Arabia. Under his government, relations with the United States were extremely cordial and friendly. His foreign policy strictly pursued and followed a "Balance Foreign Policy (BFP)" programme with an initial goal to keen to forge robust friendly ties with international community, US and European Union (EU).

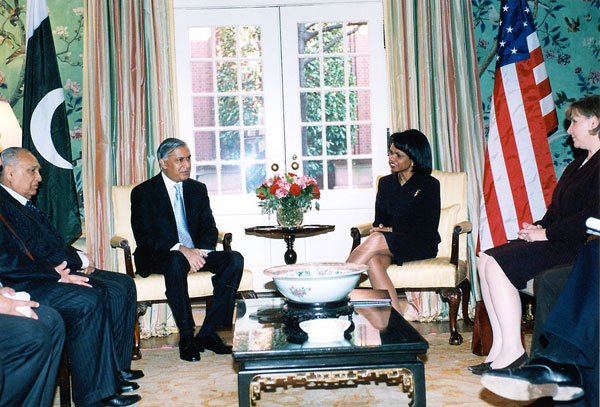
Shaukat Aziz with Condoleezza Rice, 2006

Accompanied by Recep Tayyip Erdoğan of Turkey, Aziz travelled to Iran in 2006, and privately told Iranian President Mahmoud Ahmadinejad he must change course regarding its nuclear program, as the current direction was neither in Iran's nor the region's interest. Aziz urged Ahmadinejad to immediately place a moratorium on uranium enrichment, while on the other hand Erdoğan described the EU-3 proposal, with Russian enhancements, as a very attractive offer for Iran. Both Aziz and Erdoğan condemned Ahmedinejad's statements attacking Israel as completely unacceptable and serving no purpose. Aziz's tenure saw considerable improvements in relations with Japan. After visiting Japan, Aziz welcomed investment in the manufacturing sector and Pakistani-Japanese joint ventures in steel manufacturing as an excellent symbol of cooperation in expanding steel production between the two countries.

Aziz paid a farewell visit to South Korea to strengthen and enhance relations between the two countries. Aziz cautiously supported South Korea's stance while refraining to criticise North Korea. On a three-day state visit, Aziz and his counterpart Lee Hae Chan signed two agreements on cultural exchange and providing human resource management, and improving trade and cultural ties between South Korea and Pakistan. Aziz strongly allied with the United States in the fight against terrorism, and in a meeting with an American journalist, Aziz maintained that: "Pakistan is now ideally positioned to "work with cooperation rather than confrontation as a force for peace, stability, and prosperity." During his tenure, relations with the United States strengthened and progressed. In 2006, Aziz quoted: "Pakistan-American relations are based on mutual trust and respect and are long-standing." During his repeated visits to the United States, Aziz worked and deliberately approached the U.S. administration on building a strategic partnership with the United States, and made efforts to build a "robust-broad-based strategic relationship". Aziz's economic, domestic, and internal reforms focused on enriching a longer-term sustainable Pakistan-U.S. relationship and contributed immeasurably to both countries' joint struggle against extremism.

Relations with Israel were considered important by Aziz's government, and supported Musharraf's policy on Israel. At foreign fronts, Aziz maintained a "Telephone Policy" on diplomatic engagement with Israel, whilst keeping Saudi Arabia and Turkey in tacit contact. During his tenure, bilateral relations with the United Kingdom were enhanced and reached to a new level after meeting with British prime minister Tony Blair in 2005, and tightened the economic and defence relations with British counterpart Gordon Brown in 2007. Brown thanked Aziz for the successful launching of a $500 million Eurobond, which was oversubscribed four times. After assuming the office of prime minister, Aziz left for China, as his foreign state visit as prime minister in 2004. In 2007, Aziz made his final state visit as prime minister to China to sign a Free Trade Agreement with China, and regarded the country as a "strategic partner" and a "time-tested friend", whilst China regarded the FTA agreement as "a historic development". Aziz built closer economic ties with India while alleviating the territorial conflicts. After meeting with Indian counterpart Manmohan Singh, a confident measuring building process was initiated by Aziz.

Aziz pushed his foreign policy to Russia, calling Russia a "global super power". In 2006, Aziz invited state-run and private-media of Russia where he repeatedly stressed for the need to enhance cooperation between Pakistan and Russia in the fields of education, science and technology, energy, defence and trade and investment. Finally, in 2007, Russian prime minister Mikhail Fradkov paid a three-day-long visit to Pakistan, becoming the first Russian prime minister and leader to visit the country in 38 years. During this trip, Aziz and Fradkov pledged to boost economic ties and signed two co-operation agreements .

=== Economic policy ===
Pakistan's GDP growth rate from the period of nationalisation in the 1970s until the economic boom in 2004–08

During his tenure, Aziz aggressively promoted the privatisation, deregulation and economic liberalisation programme and open the large heavy mechanical industries, petroleum companies, electropetroleum and chemical enterprises and state-owned corporations to private sectors. His tenure as finance minister and prime minister, the agriculture production and construction well increased, whilst aggressively and forcefully implementing his policies to liberalise the trade, and eliminated the non-tariff barriers. Under his regime, the maximum bound tariffs were brought down to high as 300% to 25% whilst the applied tariff averages falls in the range of 5% to 10%.

The poverty alleviation programme performances indicates Aziz's successful implementation of his policies.

GDP growth, which was at 3.9% in October 1999, stood between 6.6% and 9%. He successfully privatised all state-owned corporations and state enterprises before completing his term. However, Aziz's strategy failed deal with underlying problems deeply in country's economy. The Great Recession led to a sharp drop in the country's economy while an acute electricity shortage in the country revealed the incompetence by the Peoples Party's government, but also the failure of his government to develop the necessary energy infrastructure on time.

Political economists, however, gave other side of story by arguing that his policies were not aimed at alleviating poverty as he seldom offered relief to the poor sections of the society. Shaukat Aziz is roundly criticized for his policy of downsizing in the public sector and disintegrating the effects of nationalisation policies of Benazir Bhutto as early as the 1990s but Aziz defended as he points out that his policies made these institutions viable while they were on the verge of collapse. S. Akbar Zaidi argues that his policies mastered Pakistan's economy but such indicators are misleading and unsustainable because his policies do not examine or explain the particular, perplexing economy of Pakistan.

==== Privitization ====
An unsuccessful attempt to privatise the Pakistan Steel Mills was also thwarted by trade unions and pro-nationalization elements who took the case to Supreme Court of Pakistan in 2006. But Aziz said that his privatisation program produced "the second fastest growing economy in the world."

== Public image ==
A banker and financier by training and extensive experience in the United States, Aziz's credentials are considered extremely high and considered one of the successful finance ministers of Pakistan. His credential records are similar to those of the successful US treasury secretaries such as Bob Rubin and Nicholas F. Brady who did well under Clinton and Reagan administrations. He understandood the role of banking, finance, investment and consumer credit in economic growth of a nation. Aziz presided over a strong banking sector, and unprecedented investment and growth finance sectors in Pakistan to underpin its economy. He strengthened capital availability, an essential and increasingly important economic input, in addition to labour and land improvements. With higher education budget up 15-fold and overall education spending up 36% in two years, he focused on education to improve the availability of skilled labour to fill new jobs.

As Prime Minister and as well as Finance Minister, Aziz did extraordinarily well ... statistics on Pakistan's economic growth has now grown at 8.4%— the second fastest growing economy in the world after China

— Richard Haas, 2006

Aziz aggressively pushed land development and public and private construction spending to improve infrastructure and facilities to attract greater business investment. The international communities regarded Aziz as a reformer, with Pakistan's structural reforms ranking high amongst emerging economies. Aziz co-chaired the Secretary-General's High Level Panel on the United Nations System-wide Coherence in the areas of development, humanitarian assistance and the environment. Aziz oversaw the success of the privatisation programme in Pakistan and most of the proceeds so far have come from the telecom and banking sectors, around 80% of Pakistan's banking sector was put under the private hands.

Nothing is sacred, we are packaging up our companies.

— Prime minister Shaukat Aziz, 2006

The BBC noted that the privatisation programme, initiated by Nawaz Sharif in 1990, picked up from a jog to a sprint under watchful eyes of Prime Minister Shaukat Aziz. The prime minister is considered the chief architect of privatisation and is widely respected among foreign investors. In an interview with BBC, Aziz mentioned Pakistan's economic growth as he puts it:

Pakistan has had the most broad-based structural reform of any country in Asia. Last year, we were the second fastest growing economy in the world after China. We grew at 8.4%....

— Shaukat Aziz, 2006,

In 2008, Aziz participated in the Global Creative Leadership Summit, organised by the Louise Blouin Foundation. As a delegate, he delivered a keynote speech for the panel entitled "Economic Crisis, Economics of Change: Credit, Commodities, and Trade."

== Post-premiership ==
Shaukat Aziz currently resides in West London, United Kingdom. He serves on a number of boards and advisory boards including Millennium & Copthorne Hotels plc. and The Blackstone Group. According to Aziz, he has maintained good relations with several members of his government and the members of the Parliament including his former foreign minister Khurshid Kasuri and the former railways minister Sheikh Rasheed and his party president Chaudhry Shujaat Hussain. In the midst of 2009, the polls performed by various news agencies, Aziz's approval rating ranged from 30.7%, but ratings dramatically fell down to 17.3% in the end of 2009. In 2012, in polls managed by various news surveys, Aziz's popularity approval ratings ranged at 20.5%. Aziz remained active in political arena of the country and has vigorously defended his financial policies. Aziz criticised the care-taker government of Muhammad Mian Soomro for the economic collapse, and predicted that, "the next elections will sweep, paving the way for a two-party system to emerge with the Pakistan Muslim League in the government and the Peoples Party in the opposition".

He remains active on economic issues and harshly criticised the International Monetary Fund (IMF) for failing to show leadership during the 2008 financial crisis. While attending the international business conference at Philippines, Aziz maintained that: "This global institution (IMF) which is supposed to look at everything going on was not even in the room where meetings are going on".

=== Legal case ===
On 30 October 2011, Aziz directed a letter sent from Dubai to the Provincial Police Office to Balochistan High Court stating "he had been mentioned in the FIR registered at the Dera Bugti Police Station on 13 October 2009, which alleged that then president Pervez Musharraf used him as part of Akbar Bugti case in which the latter committed suicide during a military operation.". Aziz maintained that he was informed of "unfortunate event" through the televised media. Aziz later stated in television that Akbar Bugti died in a military operation during the night of 25/26 August 2008.

== Wealth ==
On 5 November 2017, Aziz appeared on the Paradise Papers leaks. The leaks claimed that he was linked with the Antarctic Trust, which was set up by Aziz himself. This trust was neither declared by him as prime minister nor as finance minister. Aziz, a former Citibank executive, told the ICIJ he had set the trust up for estate planning purposes and that the funds had come from his employment at Citibank. An internal Appleby document raised concerns about warrants issued for him in connection with the killing of a local leader. Aziz dismissed both the murder charge and the allegations of financial impropriety.

== Bibliography ==
- Aziz, Shaukat (2016). From Banking to the Thorny World of Politics

== See also ==
- List of prime ministers of Pakistan
- Government of Shaukat Aziz
  - Privatization in Pakistan
  - Market corporatisation
- 2008 Pakistani parliamentary election

== Notes ==
Political offices
Preceded by Ishaq Dar	Minister of Finance; 1999–2007	Succeeded by Salman Shah
Preceded by Chaudhry Shujaat Hussain	Prime Minister of Pakistan; 2004–2007	Succeeded by Muhammad Mian Soomro
