= Mohammad Uzair =

Pakistani economist (1928–2019)

Prof. Dr. Mohammad Uzair (SI)
- محمد عزیر
- Born: 8 May 1928; Barabanki, United Provinces, British India
- Died: 19 March 2019 (aged 90); Karachi, Sindh, Pakistan
- Education: M.A. (Economics), MBA(Finance), PhD (Economics)
- Alma mater: Young Christian College (Lucknow, India), University of Allahabad, Institute of Business Administration, Karachi, Wharton School of the University of Pennsylvania
- Occupation: Retired
- Employer(s): Government of Pakistan, Institute of Business Administration, Karachi, University of Karachi
- Known for: Excellence in Economics, Finance, Education and Administration
- Notable work: Interest Free Banking
- Television: Pakistan Television Corporation, Radio Pakistan
- Board member of: Monopoly Control Authority of Pakistan (MCAP) languages : Urdu, English, Arabic, Persian, Bengali
- Spouse: Raihana Uzair (1936 - 2014)
- Children: 8
- Family: Roohi Abubaker(Daughter)
- Awards: Sitara-e-Imtiaz

Mohammad Uzair (also written as Muhammad Uzair) (Urdu: محمد عذیر), was a Pakistani economist, senior bureaucrat, and professor emeritus who has held various public offices. He has written articles, and books on economics, finance, business administration, education, religion, and travel.

== Biography ==
During his stay at Allahabad University he was a class-fellow of the novelist Ibn-e-Safi and a year senior to Mustafa Zaidi. He started his career as a lecturer in 1951 at Dhaka University. Later he moved to Karachi. He attained his Master of Business Administration (MBA) degree in 1956 and Doctor of Philosophy in economics in 1960 from Wharton School of the University of Pennsylvania, Philadelphia, United States. He remained Dean & Director of Institute of Business Administration, Karachi for some time, then left teaching and joined governmental organizations. He held appointments in many financial institutions of the country. He served as Additional Secretary, Ministry of Finance from 1972 to 1976, he later worked at Muslim Commercial Bank. He last served in NDFC (National Development Financial Corporation).

He retired in 1992, re-entered the academic world and remained associated with University of Karachi and many other private educational institution as Dean and Rector. He was the first Dean & Project Director of Karachi University Business School. He appeared many times on Pakistan Broadcasting Corporation and Pakistan Television Corporation. He was a lifetime member of Pakistan Institute of International Affairs. In January 2015, his Autobiography was published with the name of Yaddasht .

He was one of the pioneers of interest-free banking, and wrote the book Interest Free Banking. In 1985, Faridi, Fazlur Rahman, published an article in Journal of King Abdul Aziz University: Islamic Economics, Vol. 2, No. 2, 1985 on this book. He is also the author of "Some thoughts on Economy, finance and management" which was published on 1 January 1974.

On 23 March 2016, he was awarded with the 3rd highest civil award of Pakistan, Sitara-e-Imtiaz, in acknowledgement of his services in the field of education in 2016. . He died on 19 March 2019 in Karachi at the age of 90.
