= Abdul Wahab (educationist) =

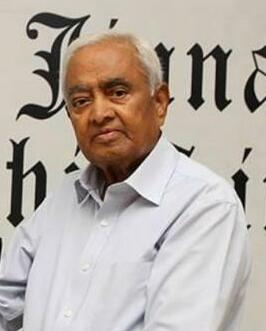
- Abdul Wahab in 2014
- Born: 1939; Tonk, Rajasthan, British India
- Died: 2016 (aged 76–77); Karachi, Pakistan
- Occupations: University professor and vice-chancellor
- Children: 4

Abdul Wahab (1939–2016) was a noted Pakistani educationist who was the vice-chancellor of the University of Karachi from 1995 to 1996. He died at the age of 77.

He was first educated at Taleemgah High School and then attended the SM Arts College to obtain a Bachelor of Arts degree. He did his MBA from the Institute of Business Administration, Karachi and then began serving as a lecturer. He received a scholarship to study in Canada, where he completed his PhD in international business. In 1978, he returned to Pakistan and the IBA.

From 1984 to 1995, he served as director of the Institute of Business Administration, Karachi.

In 2002, he became president of Mohammad Ali Jinnah University, a position he held till 2016.
