= Algeria–Pakistan relations =

- Pakistan: Algeria

Diplomatic mission
- Embassy of Pakistan, Algiers: Embassy of Algeria, Islamabad

Envoy
- Pakistani Ambassador to Algeria Khalid Hussain Khan Gudaro: Algerian Ambassador to Pakistan Dr. Brahim Romani

Relations between Algeria and Pakistan are excellent. Pakistan was one of the first countries to recognize the Provisional Government of Algerian Republic and its mission was opened in Karachi, the then capital of Pakistan in 1958. Both sides have convergence of views on issues of international importance. Both countries have also been supporting each other in various multilateral forums including UN, OIC and NAM. Algeria has an embassy in Islamabad and Pakistan has an embassy in Algiers.

== History ==
Pakistan was a strong supporter of Algerian independence even before the inception of the People's Democratic Republic of Algeria. Pakistan was one of the first countries to recognize the “Provisional Government of the Republic of Algeria” in exile on 19 September 1958 under the Prime Ministership of Farhat Abbas and had permitted it to open its Mission in Karachi.

Pakistan's firm support to the Algerian cause angered France which expected Pakistan to remain aloof of this affairs especially since Pakistan was a signatory to SEATO and CENTO.

Due to Pakistan's support for Algerian independence, Pakistan-France bilateral relations were at their lowest ebb during the period under consideration. Relations improved again when a few months later the crisis over Algeria's independence was settled with the Evian agreements signed in May 1962. The then Pakistan's Foreign minister, Manzur Qadir, welcomed this development as a victory for liberation forces.

After the death of the former prime minister of Pakistan Benazir Bhutto in December 2007, the Algerian government condemned her assassination. The Algerian Foreign Minister Mourad Medelci signed the condolence book on behalf of the Algerian President.

Pakistan has strongly condemned the terrorist attacks in Algiers on 11 December 2007, in which two bombs exploded in Algiers outside the Constitutional Council and UNHCR Office which claimed 40 lives including 17 UN personnel and the suicide bomb attack on the Prime Minister's Office on 11 April 2007 which claimed 24 lives. Former President Pervez Musharraf expressed solidarity with Algeria, condemned this attack and condoled the deaths of innocent civilians.

Following the 8 October 2005 earthquake in Pakistan, the government of Algeria sent 800 tents, 200 blankets and 10 tons of medicines. In November 2008, following an earthquake in Baluchistan, the Government of Algeria donated a cheque of US$1 million.

President of Algeria Abdelaziz Bouteflika was awarded the honour of the "Best Governed Muslim state" by a popular national daily, the Pakistan Observer in 2005.

A Pak-Algerian Group in the Pakistan Parliament was formed on 10 January 1990. The first ever Parliamentary Group in Algeria dedicated to the Promotion of friendship between Algeria and Pakistan was instituted on 29 December 1990. Subsequently, a Parliamentarian group of friendship with Algeria was also created in the Senate of Pakistan and Algeria reciprocated by establishing a 13-member Algeria-Pakistan Group of Friendship in the National Council of Transition.

The relations between the two countries got a fresh boost after the visit of the former President Musharraf in July 2003 after a long gap of twelve years. This visit was a significant step forward in strengthening and upgrading the level of bilateral relations between the two countries.The President's meeting with the Algerian President and other leaders afforded an opportunity to exchange views and develop better understanding on the wide-ranging subjects of mutual, regional and international concern. Algerians appreciated Pakistan's leading role as the front line state in international coalition to fight against terrorism and its continued commitment to cooperate with international community including Algeria to eradicate this menace.

In September 2005, the first inaugural session of the Joint Ministerial Commission (JMC) between Pakistan and Algeria was held in Islamabad. The Minister for Small and Medium Enterprises and Handicraft Mustapha Benbada, headed the Algerian delegation while the then Federal Minister for Petroleum and Natural Resources Mr. Amanullah Khan Jadoon led the Pakistani side. The Pakistan-Algeria JMC was established in 1987 and the first session took place after a lapse of 18 years. Three agreements for cooperation in the fields of small and medium enterprises (SME) and handicrafts, cultural exchange program 2005-08 and science and technology were signed.

The signing of Extradition treaty in 2003 paved the way for the repatriation of the Algerians in Pakistan.

== High-level contacts: (visits from Pakistan to Algeria) ==
1972. Former prime minister Zulfiqar Ali Bhutto visited Algeria including other countries in January 1972 in order to gain support against the international recognition of East Pakistan as Bangladesh.

1990. The then prime minister of Pakistan Benazir Bhutto visited Algeria in 1990.

1991. Former prime minister Nawaz Sharif paid a visit to Algeria in 1991.

2001. In October 2001, former prime minister of Pakistan Shaukat Aziz visited Algeria from 22 to 24 October for the 26th annual meeting of the board of governors of the Islamic Development Bank held in Algiers. The finance minister was also received by Algerian foreign minister and the then Algerian finance minister.

2003. Makhdoom Syed Faisal Saleh Hayat, former Minister of Interior & Narcotics Control visited Algeria from 24 to 26 March 2003. He also called on the Algerian president, Mr. Abdelaziz Bouteflika, and delivered to him a personal message from the president of Pakistan. He signed an extradition treaty with his Algerian counterpart.

2003. Former president General Pervez Musharraf visited Algeria from July 15 to 17, 2003, as a part of visit to three North African countries (Tunisia, Algeria and Morocco). He was accompanied by the foreign minister and Minister of State/Chairman Export Promotion Bureau. A delegation of Pakistani businessmen also accompanied the President. He met the Algerian president, the presidents of Algerian Senate and National Assembly and the head of government. The president also addressed a select group of Algerian businessmen and economic operators.

2003. An 8-member delegation of Pakistan Senate led by the Chairman Senate Mr. Mohammadmian Soomro visited Algeria from 29 August to 2 September 2003. During their 5 days' stay in Algeria, the delegation held meetings with the Algerian president, the president of Algerian Conseil de la Nation (Senate), the president of Peoples’ National Assembly, head of the government (prime minister); Foreign Minister, Minister of Trade; Minister of Culture and Information and the president of Algerian Chamber of Commerce and Industry.

2005. A 9-member delegation led by former Speaker National Assembly Ch. Amir Hussain visited Algeria from April 23 to 27, 2005. During the visit, the delegation held meetings with the president of Algeria Abdelaziz Bouteflika, the prime minister, Speaker of Algerian National Assembly, Chairman Senate, Interior and Commerce Ministers and representatives of various political parties and parliamentary committees and briefed them on various issues including the freedom movement in Jammu and Kashmir

2006. A 7-member delegation from the Ministry of Petroleum & Natural Resources of Pakistan led by the former Minister Amnaullah Khan Jadoon visited Algeria from 6–8 January 2006 on the invitation of Algerian Minister for Energy & Mines Chakib Khelil. He also held meetings with Algerian Minister for Small & Medium Enterprises Mustapha Benbada and the representatives of the Algerian Oil and Gas Company “Sonatrach”. The delegation also visited the Hassi R’mel gas field. Later a Minute was agreed in the field of energy and hydrocarbons.

2007. Chairman Joint Chiefs of Staff Committee General Ehsan ul Haq paid a visit to Algeria from 23 to 28 January 2007. He held meetings with the Minister Delegate for Defense Guenzia Abdelmalek and Chief of Algerian Armed Forces Major General Gaïd Saleh. He visited various military bases and installations. He also handed over a draft MOU on cooperation in Defense matters to the Algerian side.

== High-level contacts: (visits from Algeria to Pakistan) ==
1959. Ferhat Abbas, president of the Provisional Government of Algerian Republic (PGAR) met President Ayub Khan to solicit Pakistan's support in the war for Algeria's independence.

1974. Houari Boumedienne, former president of Algeria visited Pakistan to participate in the 4th OIC Summit Conference in Lahore.

1997. Mr. Mokdad Sifi, Minister of State to the Algerian President, attended the Extraordinary Session of OIC held in Islamabad on 23 March 1997.

1999. Ex-Speaker of Algerian National Assembly. Mr. Abdelkader Bensaleh, visited Pakistan as a Special Envoy of the president of Algeria in August, 1999.

2000. Former Foreign Minister of Algeria visited Islamabad from 4 – 6 June 2000 as Special Envoy of the Algerian President. The Special Envoy called on the chief executive, the foreign minister, the interior minister and also met the D.G.(ISI).

2003. The Algerian Minister of Privatization and Promotion of Investment visited Pakistan to attend the Investment Conference held in Islamabad from 19 to 20 April 2003.

2003. The ex-Algerian Chief of the Peoples’ National Army General Major Mohammad Lamari visited Pakistan from December 13 to 18, 2003, at the invitation of ex chairman of Joint Chiefs Staff Committee General Mohammad Aziz Khan. The visit focused on the ways and means to improve defence cooperation as Pakistan.

2007 Mr. Tayeb Belaïz, Minister of Justice visited Pakistan in May 2007 to participate in the 34th ICFM of OIC countries at Islamabad. He also called on our chairman of Senate Mr. Mohammadmian Soomro.

2007 Mr. Abdelkader Bensaleh, president of Council of Nation (Algerian Senate) led a delegation of Algerian legislators to Pakistan in June 2007 and called on President Musharraf, Chairman Senate Mr. Mohammadmian Soomro and former Speaker of National Assembly Chaudhry Amir Hussain. He also visited the provincial assemblies in Lahore and Karachi.

== High-level contact on the sidelines of international forums ==
2000. Former President General Pervez Musharraf met with Algerian President on April 12, 2000 on the sidelines of the South-South Summit in Havana. Both the leaders stressed the need for cementing the bilateral relation and bridging the gap on irritants particularly relating to security concerns.

2000. Pakistani Foreign Minister met with the Algerian Secretary General of the Ministry of Foreign Affairs on the sidelines of the 27th ICFM held in Kuala Lumpur on June 29, 2000.

2000. Former President Musharraf held another meeting with the Algerian President in New York on September 10, 2000 where the meeting dwelt largely on the issue of the Algerian – Afghans.

2001. Pakistan's Foreign Minister held a meeting in Doha with his Algerian counterpart on October 10, 2001 where again the Algerian Foreign Minister raised the issue of Arab Afghans.

2008. Former Foreign Minister Inam ul Haq met the Algerian Foreign Minister Mourad Medelci during the 11th OIC Summit in Senegal in March 2008. Both expressed satisfaction over the state of friendly relations existing between the two states and emphasized to further improve these relations. They discussed the potential avenues where bilateral cooperation could be enhanced further and found convergence of view on terrorism which is against the tenets of Islam. The two Foreign Ministers agreed on the application of the OIC resolutions especially those related to the economic development of the members of OIC.

== Pakistan–Algeria economic profile ==
Since 1991–92, the balance of trade between the two nations has been in favour of Pakistan due to increased export of textile products, (cotton yarn, fabrics and readymade garments) sports goods, surgical goods, matches and henna etc.

The export from Pakistan to Algeria for June–May 2006-7 increased to US$22.617 million from the figure of June–May 2005-6 which was about US$11.203 million. The Pakistan-Algeria trade is mostly done via third country, i.e. Dubai and is heavily under-invoiced. This is the reason the trade figures do not show the real picture of the bilateral trade.

=== Trade figures ===
In thousands of US dollars

Year	Exports	Imports	Total volume
2000-01	3,887	143	4,030
2001-02	5,613	56	5,669
2002-03	6,357	289	6,646
2003-04	7,612	603	8,215
2004-05	13,137	339	13,476
2005-06	11,203	6,147	17,450
2006-07	25,178	1,748	26,926
2007-08	24,800	n.a.	n.a.

Both countries maintain full diplomatic relations with each other and have their respective embassies in the Algiers and Islamabad.

== See also ==
- Foreign relations of Algeria
- Foreign relations of Pakistan
