= Abu Bakr Ahmad Haleem =

Pakistani political scientist (1897–1975)

- Born: 1897; British India
- Died: 20 April 1975 (aged 77–78); Karachi, Sindh, Pakistan
- Education: Patna University; University of Oxford
- Known for: Pakistan Movement and helped in establishing the Pakistan Institute of International Affairs
- Scientific career
- Fields: Political science
- Workplaces: Karachi University; Aligarh Muslim University; University of Oxford; Sindh University

Abu Bakr Ahmad Haleem (Urdu: ابو بكر احمد حليم; commonly known as A. B. A. Haleem) (1897 – 20 April 1975) was a Pakistani political scientist and the first vice-chancellor of Karachi University.

== Early life and career ==
Abu Bakr Ahmed Haleem was born in 1897 in Irki village in Bihar, British Indian Empire (now in India). From the Patna University he gained Bachelor of Arts and Master of Arts degrees in political science. He attended the University of Oxford in England where he gained a Doctor of Philosophy degree in political science and was called at Lincoln's Inn as Bar-at-law. Upon returning to India in 1923, Haleem accepted a professorship in history at the Aligarh Muslim University. In 1944, he joined the Muslim League and took active participation in Pakistan Movement. At one point he reportedly told Muhammad Ali Jinnah: "Mr. Jinnah, we are teaching history and you are making it." In support of Jinnah, the AMU was also closed on 3 November 1941. The University Muslim League also formed a writers committee under Haleem which produced articles and pamphlets on Pakistan.

After the establishment of Pakistan in 1947, Haleem was appointed the first Vice-Chancellor of Sindh University at the behest of Jinnah and in 1951 he gained that post at Karachi University.

In 1970, he became chairman of Pakistan Institute of International Affairs (PIIA) which he chaired until 1974. In 1975, he once returned to Karachi University to teach political science and stayed there until his death on 20 April 1975.

== Death and legacy ==
He died on 20 April 1975 in Karachi.
