= List of ambassadors of Algeria to Pakistan =

This is a list of ambassadors of Algeria to Pakistan. The current ambassador is Brahim Romani. The ambassador is based at the Algerian embassy in Islamabad and is concurrently accredited as a non-resident ambassador to Bangladesh.

== List of ambassadors ==
The following is a partial list of Algerian ambassadors to Pakistan:

- Mohamed Messaoud Kellou (1961–1962)
- S. Sekkion (1965)
- Seedi Bin Abdul Rahman (1971)
- Ahmed Tewfik El Madani (1971)
- Brahim Ghafa (1984–1986)
- Abdelhamid Senouci Bereksi (1988)
- Muhi Al-Din Amimour (1989–1992)
- Aissa Seferdjeli (2003)
- Nadir Larbaoui (2004–2008)
- Ahmed Benflis (2009–2015)
- Lakhal Benkelai (2015–2021)
- Brahim Romani (2021–present)
