= Mahreen Zuberi =

Pakistani artist

- Born: Mahreen Asif Zuberi; June 1, 1981 (age 44); Karachi, Pakistan
- Years active: 2003–present
- Organization(s): Karachi University, Beaconhouse National University, Indus Valley School of Art and Architecture

Mahreen Asif Zuberi (born January 6, 1981) is a Pakistani artist from Karachi, Pakistan. She studied at the National College of Arts in Lahore where she completed her Bachelor of Fine Arts with distinction.

== Career ==
She works at Karachi University in Karachi, Pakistan as the Fine Arts program Coordinator in the Department of Visual Studies. Her work has been exhibited since 2003. Her work is in the collection of the QAGOMA (Queensland Art Gallery and Gallery of Modern Art), the Fukuoka Asian Art Museum and the Devi Art Foundation.

== Exhibitions ==
- "A Thousand and One Days: The Art of Pakistani Women Miniaturists", Honolulu Academy of Arts (2005, group exhibit)
- "Hanging fire", Asia Society Museum (2008, group exhibit)
- "Associated Metaphors: An exhibition of Neo-Miniatures", IVS Gallery (2008, group exhibit)
- "Resemble Reassemble", Devi Art Foundation (2010, group exhibit)
- "Contemporary Miniatures", (2011-2012, traveling group exhibit)
- Gladstone Regional Art Gallery and Museum
- Perc Tucker Regional Gallery
- Exercising the Border. Anita Rogers Gallery, New York (2023)
