= From Banking to the Thorny World of Politics =

2016 book by Shaukat Aziz and Anna Mikhailova

- Author: Shaukat Aziz; Anna Mikhailova
- Language: English
- Subject: Pakistani politics
- Genre: Political memoir
- Publisher: Quartet Books
- Publication date: 2016
- Publication place: United Kingdom
- Media type: Print (hardcover)
- Pages: 325
- ISBN: 9780704373990
- OCLC: 920844681

From Banking to the Thorny World of Politics is a 2016 book co-authored by Shaukat Aziz, the former Prime Minister of Pakistan, with journalist Anna Mikhailova. The book outlines Aziz's experiences during his tenure as prime minister, spanning interactions with international leaders such as George W. Bush, Tony Blair, and Kofi Annan. It comprises 17 chapters and covers Aziz's personal journey in politics with discussions on global security and political dynamics.

The book begins with the extradition of Nawaz Sharif from Pakistan in 1999, discussing the involvement of the United States and Saudi Arabia in the political developments that followed. It recounts Aziz's appointment as finance minister of Pakistan and later as prime minister in 2004 by Pervez Musharraf.

The text avoids a chronological structure, instead focusing on thematic analyses of political and security issues. While it offers a comprehensive view of Aziz's political career and Pakistan's geopolitical context, the book often presents known information without significant new analysis or critical perspective.

In its final chapters, Aziz reflects on leadership and governance, endorsing a presidential system over a parliamentary one for Pakistan. However, the book's discussion occasionally omits detailed examination of controversial subjects and significant events from Aziz's administration, which may limit its scholarly and critical value.

== Reception ==
The book was reviewed by Dawn and Gulf News.
