= Kanwal Ahmed =

Entrepreneur

- Education: Karachi Grammar School; Institute of Business Administration (M.B.A.)
- Occupations: Entrepreneur, talk show host

Kanwal Ahmad is a Pakistani entrepreneur, activist, talk show host, executive producer, and the founder of Soul Sisters Pakistan, a Facebook group created for women to discuss taboo topics and break the culture of silence. She is also the host of her own web series, "Conversations with Kanwal".

== Personal life ==
Kanwal was born in Karachi. Kanwal competed her high school from Karachi Grammar School. she then went to Institute of Business Administration where she completed her Bachelor's in Business Administration in 2014. Kanwal got married at the age of 22 and has one daughter. She now lives in Canada.

Kanwal had always enjoyed writing diaries. As she got older, she was introduced to blogging. However, her parents didn't want their children spending too much time on the internet and so had their time limited. Kanwal then started maintaining a Wordpress journal using the internet at her school. Through her blogging experience, she learned about many social issues which set the base for her future career.

== Career ==
Kanwal started blogging about social issues in the 2000s during her school years. She later started working as a makeup artist. During this time, she often heard the brides she was dressing up, talking about issues people face after marriage. The conversations inspired Kanwal to create a community where these subjects could be talked about in a safe space without women having to face any judgement.

=== Soul Sisters Pakistan ===
In 2013, to give women from Pakistan a safe space to talk about their issues and encourage dialogue, Kanwal started the Soul Sisters group on Facebook. She said she wanted women to discuss taboo topics without being harassed or judged. Kanwal said she was looking to break the culture of silence and help women discover their voice. Kanwal's group gained a lot attention on Facebook and soon it had over 264,000 members. The group now has women from other South Asian countries as well. Much of the conversation is on marital problems, divorce, domestic violence and other social issues.

Soul Sisters also has in-person meetups in Karachi. According to Kanwal “We arrange a sitting for about 500 women in one event. Here, they can confide in one another without having the fear of being judged or being laughed at. Nobody is belittled.” Women in the group, who call themselves ‘Soulies’, offer each other emotional and mental support and advice on various issues.

In 2018, Kanwal was selected for the Facebook Community Leadership Program. The program saw 6,000+ applicants from around the world and shortlisted 115 community leaders. The program's purpose was to give the selected leaders a chance to develop their leadership skills, further their proposed initiatives and gain funding and networking opportunities to become community leaders.

=== Talk Show ===
Using the funding gained from the Facebook Community Leadership Program, Kanwal started her digital talk show "Conversations with Kanwal". The show was created with the aim to feature "real stories to spark conversations around important issues". The series launched its first episode on 17 November 2019. It featured women telling their stories of abuse, domestic violence and other social issues. The show had 12 episodes in total with a new episode launching every Sunday. Kanwal's show gained over 15 million views. After its success, the show launched season 2 of the series.

Kanwal has also appeared in Neo Tv's reality show 'Idea Croron ka', a show that allows rising entrepreneurs to pitch their ideas with adequate funding. The show is partnered with Facebook to fund entrepreneurs across the country. Kanwal recently launched an initiative #SheMeansBusiness that aims to train women entrepreneurs and kickstart small businesses.
