= Karachi University Business School =

Business School

- Motto: We Prepare Business Leaders for the Right Organization
- Type: Public
- Established: 1999
- Parent institution: University of Karachi
- Chairman: Prof Dr. Muhammad Asim
- Dean: Prof Dr. Tahir Ali
- Students: 10000
- Location: Karachi, Pakistan
- Website: www.kubs.edu.pk/

The Karachi University Business School (KUBS) (Urdu: کراچی یونیورسٹی بزنس اسکول) operates under the Faculty of Management & Administrative Sciences at the University of Karachi. The school was established between 1999-2000 and was subsequently granted autonomy. Mohammad Uzair was the first Dean and Project Director of KUBS.

The 2 year MBA (Banking and Finance) program is administered in collaboration with the Institute of Bankers Pakistan (IBP), whose admissions are made public separately.

== Programs ==
- BBA 4 years
- MBA 1.5 years
- MBA 2.5 years
- EMBA 2.5 years
- MS program
- Ph.D. program
- BS (Business Administration) 4 years
