= Embassy of Algeria, Islamabad =

Embassy of Algeria, Islamabad سفارة الجزائر في إسلام آباد (Arabic) Ambassade d'Algérie à Islamabad (French)
- Location: Islamabad, Pakistan
- Address: House No. 107, St. No. 9, Sector E-7
- Coordinates: 33.728387°N 73.046287°E
- Ambassador: Brahim Romani

The Embassy of Algeria in Islamabad is the diplomatic mission of Algeria to Pakistan. It is located at House No. 107, St. No. 9, in Sector E-7, Islamabad. Pakistan was one of the first countries to recognise the Provisional Government of the Algerian Republic in 1958. This was followed shortly later by Algeria opening its diplomatic mission in Karachi, then the capital of Pakistan.

The embassy provides consular services to Algerian citizens in Pakistan, and facilitates bilateral relations between the two countries. It also promotes cultural relations. In 2014, the embassy arranged ballot voting amongst its citizens for the Algerian presidential election.

The current Algerian ambassador to Pakistan is Brahim Romani, who is concurrently also the non-resident ambassador to Bangladesh.
