= University of Karachi =

Public university in Karachi, Pakistan

Coordinates: 24.94°N 67.12°E

- Motto: رَبِّ زدْنيِ عِلْماً (Arabic) اے میرے رب میرے علم میں اضافہ فرما (Urdu)
- Motto in English: O my Lord! Advance me in Knowledge
- Type: Public
- Established: 1951; 75 years ago
- Affiliations: Higher Education Commission (Pakistan); Pakistan Engineering Council; Pharmacy Council of Pakistan; Pakistan Bar Council
- Chancellor: Governor of Sindh
- Vice-Chancellor: Professor Dr. Khalid Mehmood Iraqi
- Administrative staff: 3500
- Students: 41,000 (Full time students only)
- Location: Karachi, Sindh, Pakistan
- Campus: 5.18 km2
- Colours: Green, White
- Nicknames: UoK, KU
- Website: uok.edu.pk

The University of Karachi (Urdu: جامعہ کراچی; informally Karachi University, KU, or UoK) is a public research university located in Karachi, Sindh, Pakistan. It was established in June 1951 by an act of Parliament as a successor to the University of Sindh (now located in Jamshoro). The university was designed by Mohsin Baig as its chief architect.

With a total student body of 41,000 full-time students and a campus size spanning over 490 ha (1,200 acres), Karachi University is one of the largest universities in Pakistan with a distinguished reputation for multi-disciplinary research in science and technology, medical, and social sciences. The university has over 53 departments and 19 research institutes operating under nine faculties. There are over 893 academics and more than 2500 supporting staff working for the university.

In 2008, the university was named for the first time by THE-QS World University Rankings among the top 600 universities in the world. In 2009, the university was named as one of the top 500 universities in the world, while in 2016 it was ranked among the top 250 in Asia and 701st in the world. In 2019, it was ranked 801st in the world and 251st in Asia. The University of Karachi is a member of the Association of Commonwealth Universities of the United Kingdom.

== History ==
At the time of establishment of Pakistan as a sovereign state in 1947, the means for higher education and research were negligible and diminished in the country. Responding to the impending requirement of higher learning, Pakistan Government started establishing educational institutions of higher learning and research and thus underwent rapid modernization under a policy guided by Prime Minister Liaquat Ali Khan. Its first Vice-chancellor was Dr. ABA Haleem. In 1953 it started its teaching and research activities at two faculties: the Faculty of Arts and the Faculty of Science.

For the first two years, the University of Karachi remained an examination university for the affiliated colleges. Over the years, the enrollment expanded rapidly. Karachi University first intake was 50 students, the university now has 53 academic departments and 20 Research Centers and Institutes, under faculties of Social Sciences, Science, Islamic Studies, Engineering, Law, Pharmacy, Management and Administrative Sciences and Medicines. The enrollment of regular students at the campus is around 28,000. There are over 700 faculty members and circa 2,100 supporting staff.

Michael Ecochard designed the Karachi University master plan and campus buildings.

=== Past appointed Vice-Chancellors ===
List of Vice-Chancellors of the University of Karachi (1951–present)
Vice-Chancellors	Department Faculty	Tenure Starting-date	Tenure completed-date
Prof. Abu Bakr Ahmad Haleem	Political Science	23 June 1951	22 Jun 1957
Prof. Basheer Ahmad Hashmi		23 June 1957	22 June 1961
Prof. Ishtiaq Hussain Qureshi	History	23 June 1961	2 August 1971
Prof. Mahmud Hussain	English Literature	3 August 1971	9 April 1975
Prof. Saleemuzzaman Siddiqui (Interim)	Chemistry	10 April 1975	16 January 1976
Prof. Ehsan Rasheed	Economics	7 January 1976	31 August 1979
Prof. S. Masum Ali Tirmizi	Physics	1 September 1979	31 August 1983
Prof. Jameel Jalibi	Urdu literature	1 September 1983	31 August 1987
Prof. Manzooruddin Ahmad	Political Science	1 September 1987	7 July 1990
Prof. S. Irtafaq Ali	Botany	8 July 1990	6 July 1994
Prof. Abdul Wahab (educationist) (Acting)	Institute of Business Administration, Karachi	6 July 1994	4 April 1995
Prof. Abdul Wahab (educationist)	Institute of Business Administration, Karachi	5 April 1995	9 November 1996
Prof. Hafeez A. Pasha	Economics	10 November 1996	24 July 1997
Prof. Zafar H. Zaidi		25 July 1997	7 January 2001
Prof. Zafar Saeed Saify (Interim)		12 January 2001	28 February 2001
Prof. Zafar Saeed Saify		1 March 2001	5 January 2004
Prof. Pirzada Qasim	Physiology	6 January 2004	9 February 2012
Prof. Dr. Muhammad Qaiser	Botany	10 February 2012	24 January 2017
Prof. Dr. Muhammad Ajmal Khan	Botany	24 January 2017	4 May 2019
Prof. Dr. Khalid Mehmood Iraqi (Interim)	Public Administration	16 May 2019	1 March 2022
Prof. Dr. Nasira Khatoon (Interim)	Zoology	2 March 2022	28 July 2022
Prof. Dr. Khalid Mehmood Iraqi	Public Administration	29 July 2022	Incumbent

== Campus ==
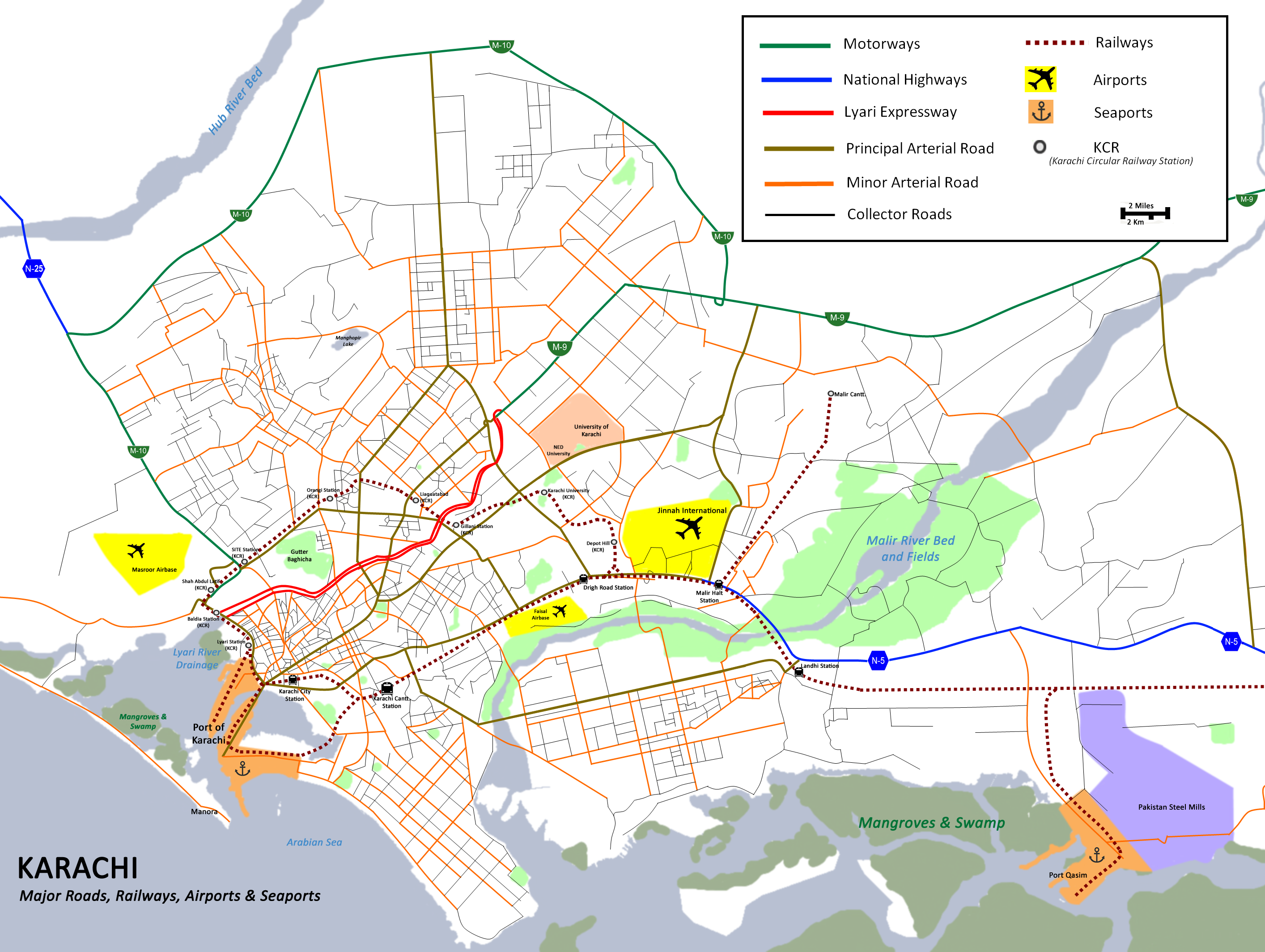
Location in Karachi

The university campus area is over 5.18 square kilometres (1,279 acres) of land, situated 12 km away from the city center of Karachi. The university has about four percent of International students who come from 23 different countries in the regions of Central Asia, the Middle East (West Asia) and Europe. The university has a high standard of teaching, with many professors being well-known scholars and academics of international repute. In a short span of 40 years, the university has risen to acquire a high status in the field of education in Pakistan as well as in the region.

On November 27, 2023, the Bohra community leader Dr. Syedna Mufaddal Saifuddin inaugurated a new state-of-the-art facility for law students on the Karachi University (KU) campus. The new School of Law building, spread over 45,000 square feet, features an Islamic ethos of positive change through education. With its large capacity, the building will allow a greater number of graduate and postgraduate students to pursue multiple law programs.

=== Academic emphasis ===
The most prestigious research center of the university is the International Center for Chemical and Biological Sciences which has over 500 students enrolled for PhD in organic chemistry, biochemistry, molecular medicine, genomics, nanotechnology and other fields. The Husein Ebrahim Jamal Research Institute of Chemistry, Dr. Panjwani Center for Molecular Medicine and Drug Development and the Jamil-ur-Rahman Center for Genome Research are an integral part of this multi-disciplinary research center. It was selected as the UNESCO Center of Excellence in 2016. The university's physics and statistics departments are claimed to be well known departments and its research output plays a vital role in the development of science and technology in the country.

Furthermore, the department of mathematical sciences is one of the largest departments in the Faculty of Science, which has a three-floor building consisting of an electronic laboratory for computational mathematics.

=== Library system ===
The University of Karachi Library is officially known as the "Dr. Mahmud Hussain Library" which has houses well over 400,000 volumes dating back to the 1600s, for researchers as well as for use by students of advanced studies and faculty members. The library became the depository of the personal book collection of Muhammad Ali Jinnah– the founder of Pakistan.

Established and constructed in 1952, the Dr. Mahmud Hussain Library is an imposing five story and basement structure firmly placed in the center of campus activities. Teachers from over 100 affiliated colleges frequent the university, along with scholars from 19 research institutions. A loan and resource sharing system exists with other academic entities in the Karachi area. A digital library enables scholars and students to access online books and journals. 25 librarians, 10 assistant librarians and around 90 nonprofessional staff help maintain the library. The building includes six reading rooms for general purposes and six for research. The International Centre for Chemical and Biological Sciences has within it the Latif Ebrahim Jamal Science Information Centre which is the national focal point for distance education.

Previously called the Karachi University Library, it was renamed the Dr. Mahmud Hussain Library by unanimous resolution of the Karachi University Syndicate on 12 April 1976— the first death anniversary of Prof. Dr. Mahmud Hussain Khan. Mahmud Hussain served as the university's Vice-Chancellor from 1971 to 1975 and the library was named in recognition of his contribution to the teaching of social sciences in Pakistan. Dr. Hussain was the first professor the university appointed to its faculty of International Relations and History. He introduced library science to Pakistan by instituting the Faculty of Journalism and Library Science at the university. He also actively worked to improve the status and pay scales of the library staff to make them at par with the university's other faculty members.

== Karachi University Press ==
In 1957, the Bureau of Composition, Compilation and Translation (BCC&T) was established with main objectives to translate vocabulary containing Urdu synonyms of technical terms, Urdu translation of textbooks of various subjects and classical literature of foreign languages into Urdu language, and translation of Urdu classical literature into other languages. To meet the printing needs, a press was purchased in 1988. On 14 October 1999, BCC&T merged with the press operations to form Karachi University Press.

== Faculties and departments ==
The University of Karachi has 9 faculties:

Departments and Faculties
Faculty	The listed active Academic department(s) and the academic Chair(s) of the University of Karachi (KU)
Faculty of Social Sciences	Department of Arabic; Department of Bengali; Department of Criminology; Department of Economics; Department of English; Department of General History; Department of International Relations; Department of Islamic History; Department of Library and Information Science; Department of Mass Communication; Department of Persian; Department of Philosophy; Department of Political Science; Department of Psychology; Department of Sindhology; Department of Sociology; Department of Social Works; Department of Urdu; Department of Visual Studies; Department of Research Facility Center; Shah Abdul Latif Chair
Faculty of Engineering	Department of Chemical Engineering
Faculty of Management & Administrative Sciences	Department of Commerce; Department of Public Administration; Karachi University Business School
Faculty of Engineering	Department of Chemical Engineering
Faculty of Education	Department of Education; Department of Special Education; Department of Teacher Education
Faculty of Islamic studies	Department of Islamic Learning; Department of Quran-o-Sunnah; Department of Usul-ud-Din; Sirah Chair
Faculty of Law	School of Law
Faculty of Medicine	Karachi Medical Dental College; Offers MS in Surgery and MD in Medicine
Faculty of Pharmacy	Department of Pharmaceutical Chemistry; Department of Pharmaceutics; Department of Pharmacology; Department of Pharmacognosy
Faculty of Science	Department of Agriculture and Agribusiness; Department of Applied Chemistry; Department of Applied Physics; Department of Biochemistry; Department of Bio-Technology; Department of Botany; Department of Chemistry; Department of Computer Science (UBIT); Department of Food Science and Technology; Department of Genetics; Department of Geology; Department of Geography; Department of Health and Physical Education; Department of Mathematical Sciences; Department of Microbiology; Department of Petroleum Technology; Department of Physics; Department of Physiology; Department of Statistics; Department of Zoology

== Research institutes and centres ==
- Research Institute of Pharmaceutical Sciences
- Applied Economics Research Centre
- Area Study Center for Europe
- Center for Digital Forensic Science and Technology
- Center of Excellence for Women Study
- Center of Excellence in Marine Biology
- Center for Molecular Genetics
- Centre for Plant Conservation
- Confucius Institute
- Hussain Ebrahim Jamal Research Institute of Chemistry
- Dr. Panjwani Center for Molecular Medicine
- Jamil-ur-Rahman Center for Genome Research
- Dr. A.Q. Khan Institute of Biotechnology and Genetic Engineering
- Dr. A.Q. Khan Research Laboratories
- Institute of Clinical Psychology
- Institute of Environmental Studies
- Institute of Pharmaceutical Sciences
- Department of Main Communication Network
- Institute of Marine Science
- National Institute of Virology
- M.A.H.Q Biological Research Centre
- National Center for Proteomics
- National Nematological Research Centre
- Pakistan Study Center
- Sheikh Zayed Islamic Centre
- Institute of Space and Planetary Astrophysics
- Institute for Sustainable Halophyte Utilization
- Marine Reference & Research Collection Center
- Umaer Basha Institute of Technology
- Sardar Yasin Malik Professional Development Centre
- H H Dr Syedna Mufaddal Saifuddin Building—School of Law

== Alumnus and people ==
Since its establishment in 1951, the university has attracted prominent scholars and renowned educationists as its faculty members, researchers and associated scholars. Scholars and educationists such as Iqbal Hussain Qureshi, Rafiuddin Raz, Mahmud Hussain, Saleemuzzaman Siddiqui, Abdul Qadeer Khan, I H Qureshi, Raziuddin Siddiqui, Atta-ur-Rahman, Mahreen Asif Zuberi, Prof.Khursheed Ahmed, Bina Shaheen Siddiqui are some of those, that have been affiliated with the institution. The faculty was drawn not only from Pakistan but also included eminent educationists from the United Kingdom and the United States. A visit has been made by English Higher Education Leader Chris Husbands to begin collaborative awarding.

== Gallery ==
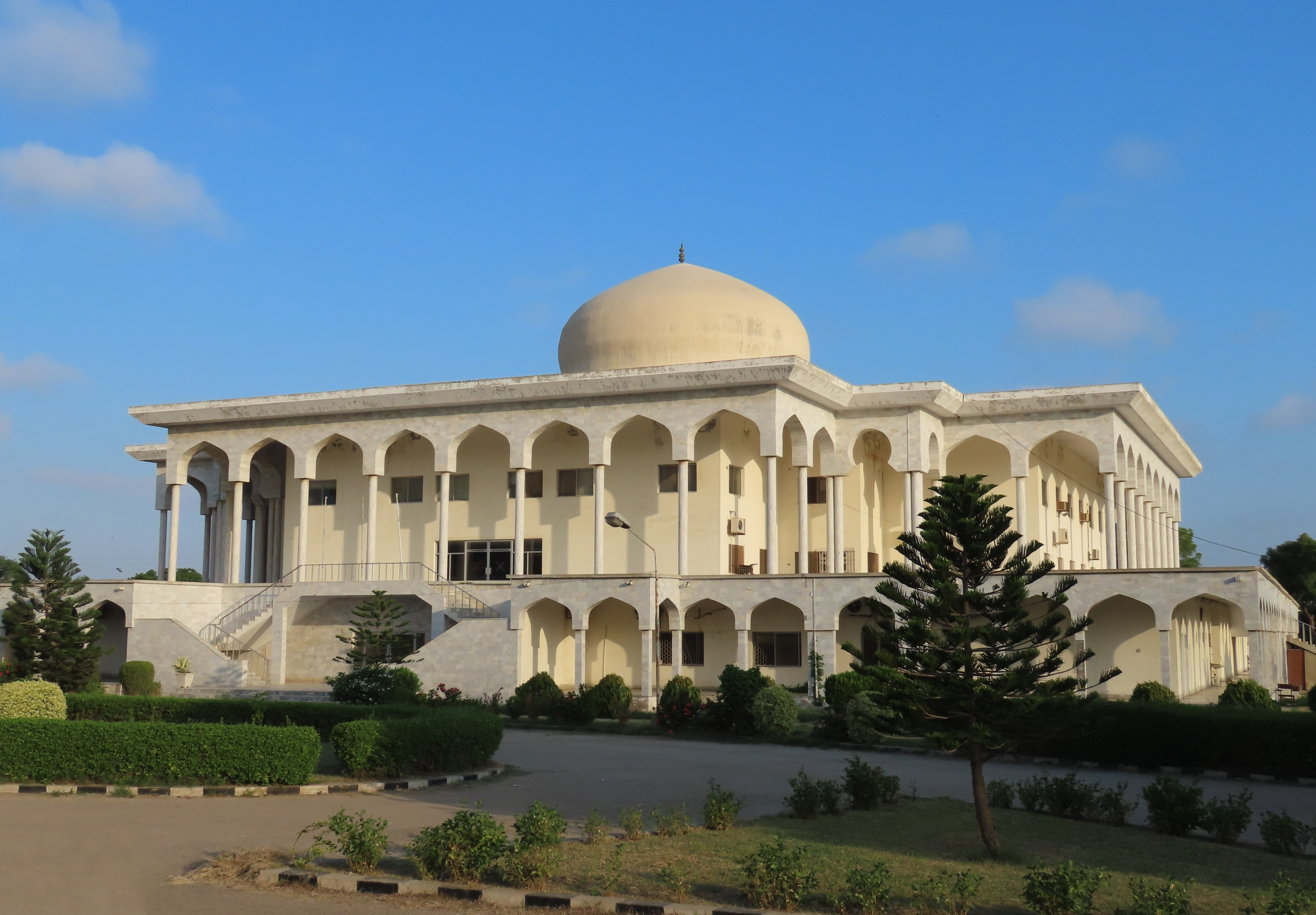
Sheikh Zayed Islamic Centre

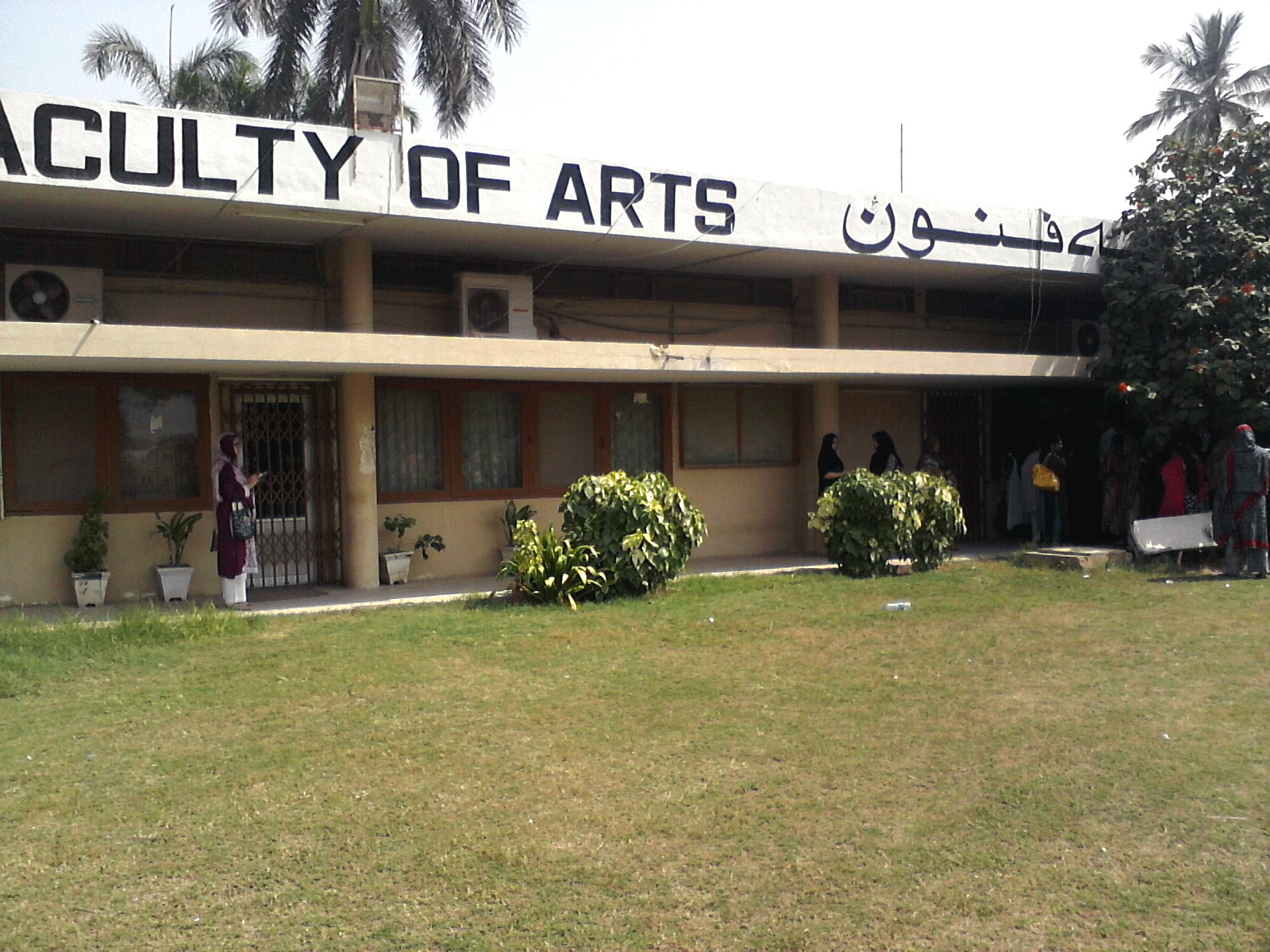
Offices of the Dean of Faculty of Arts and Social Sciences

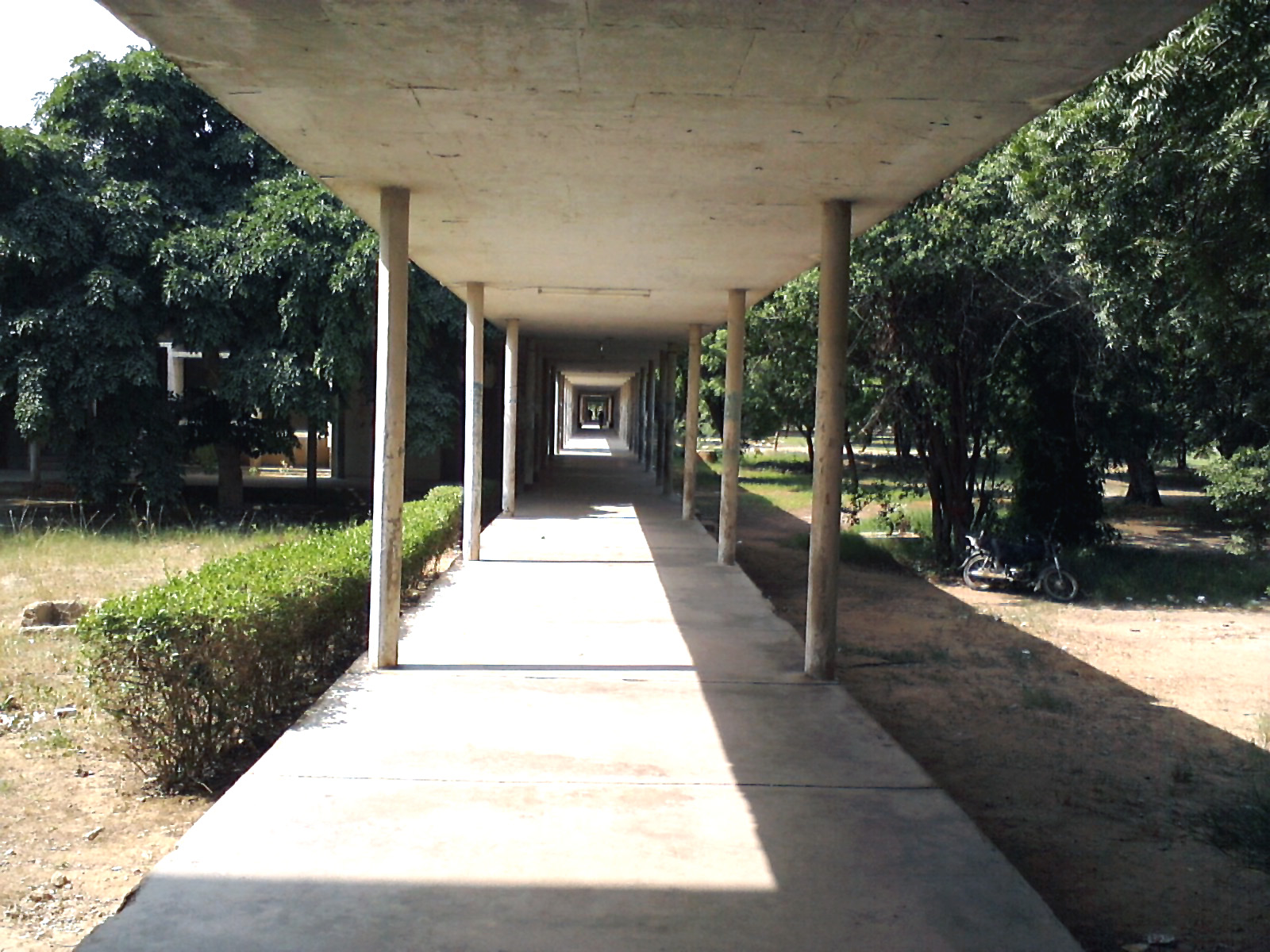
Way to Arts Lobby

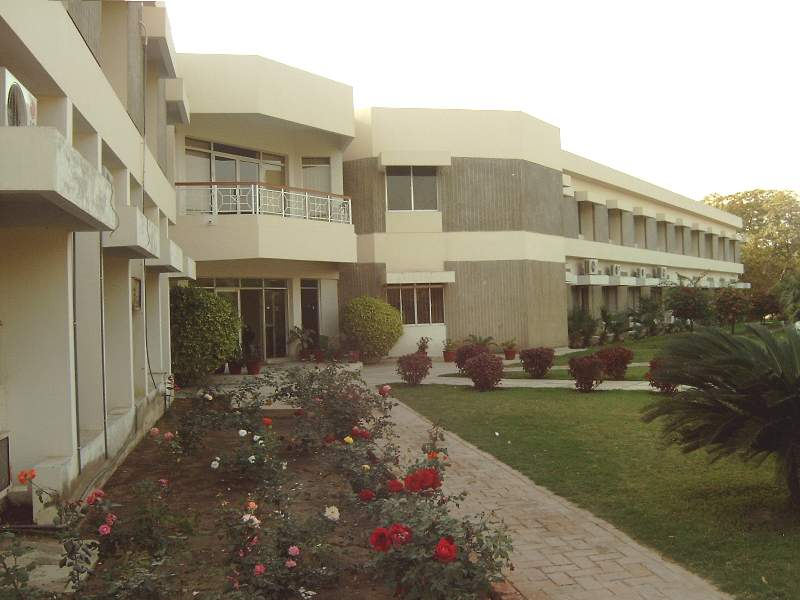
Applied Economics Research Centre, KU

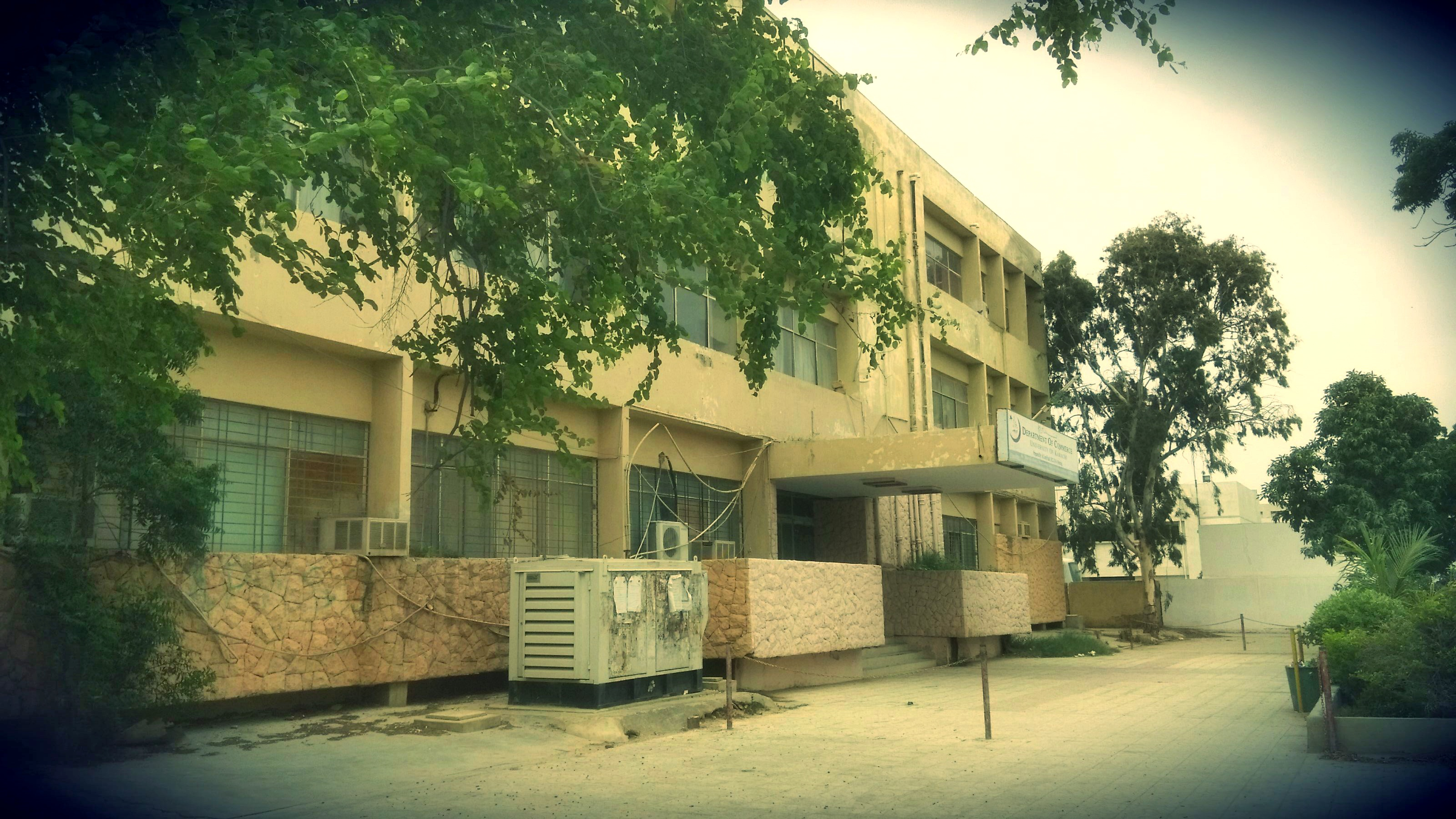
Commerce Building

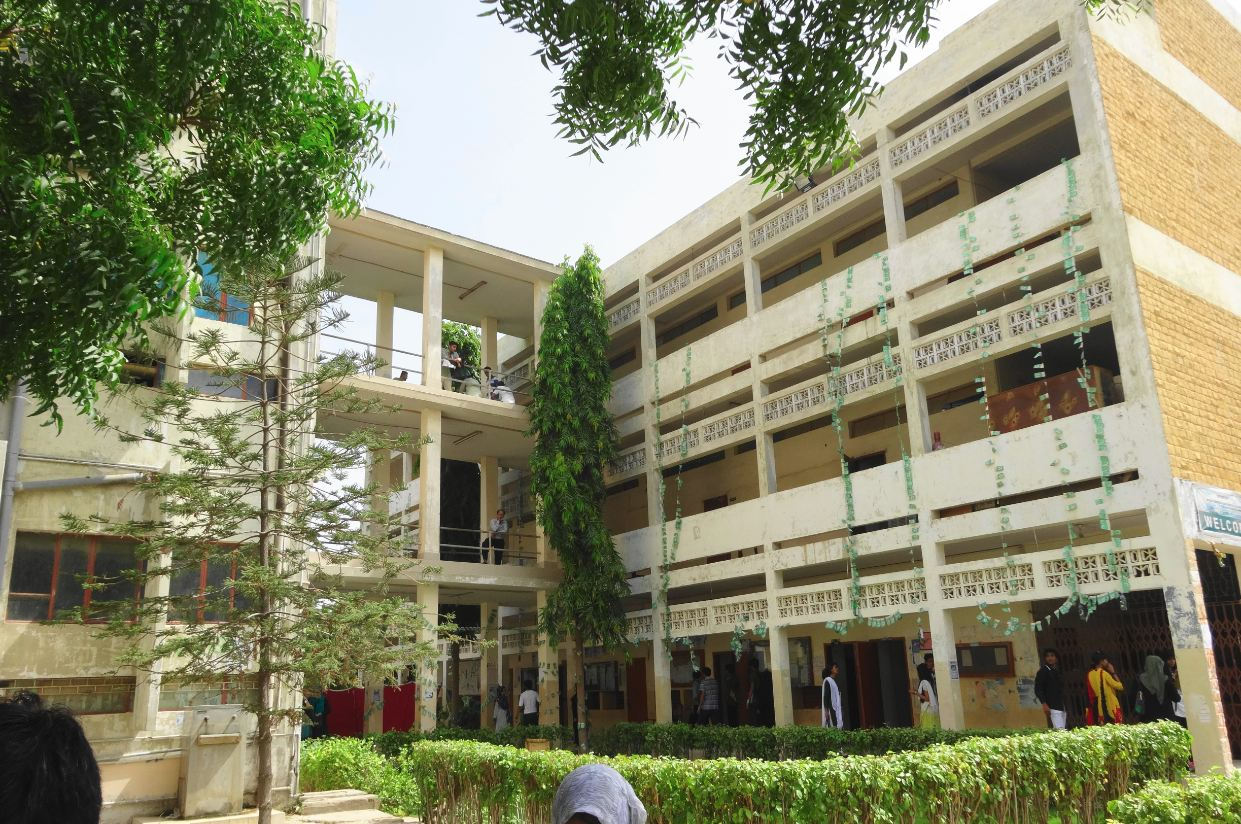
Department of Applied Chemistry

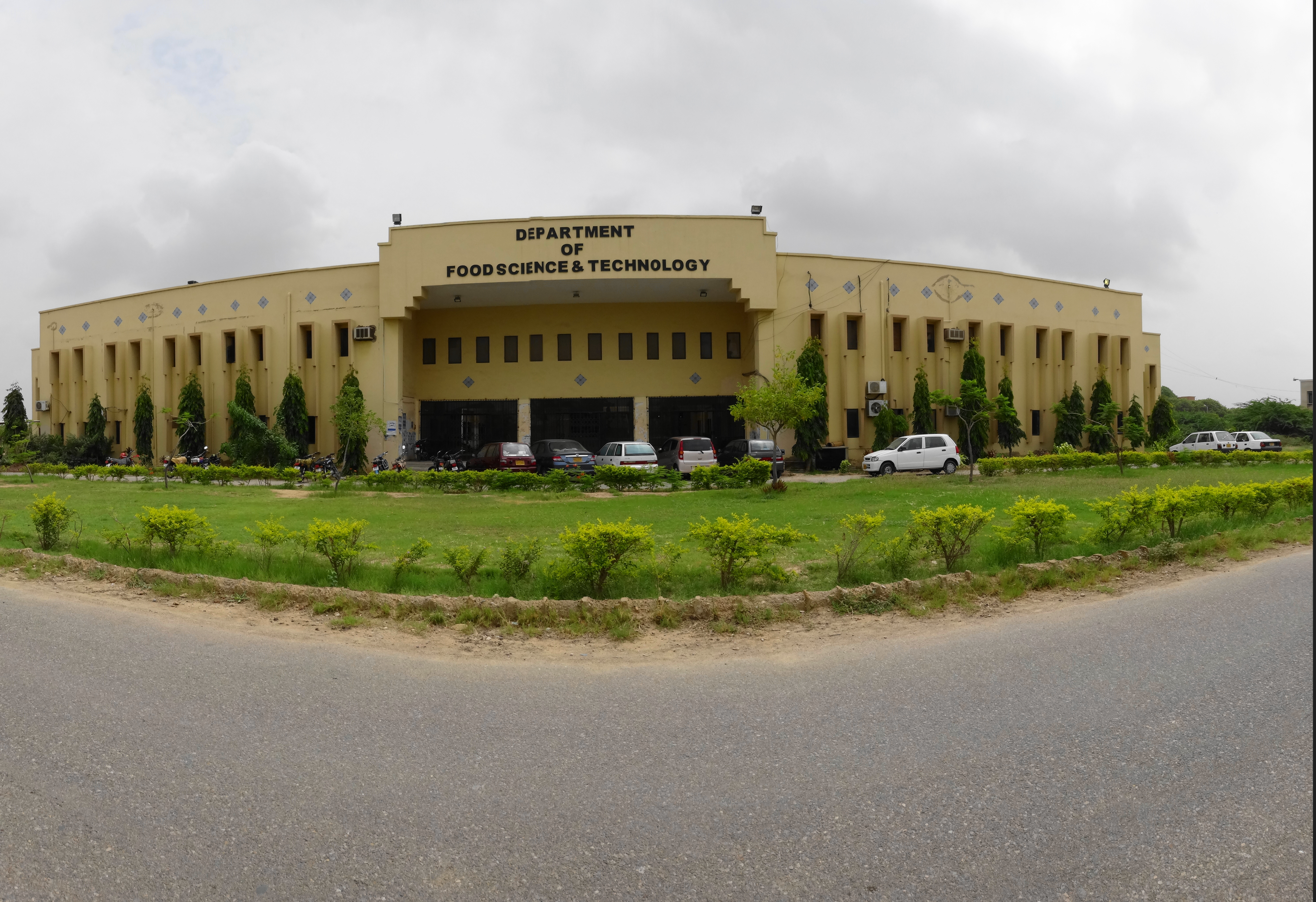
Department of Food Science & Technology,

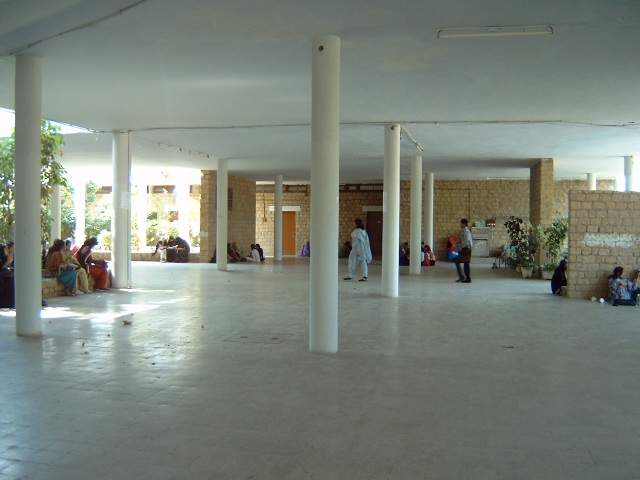
Arts Lobby

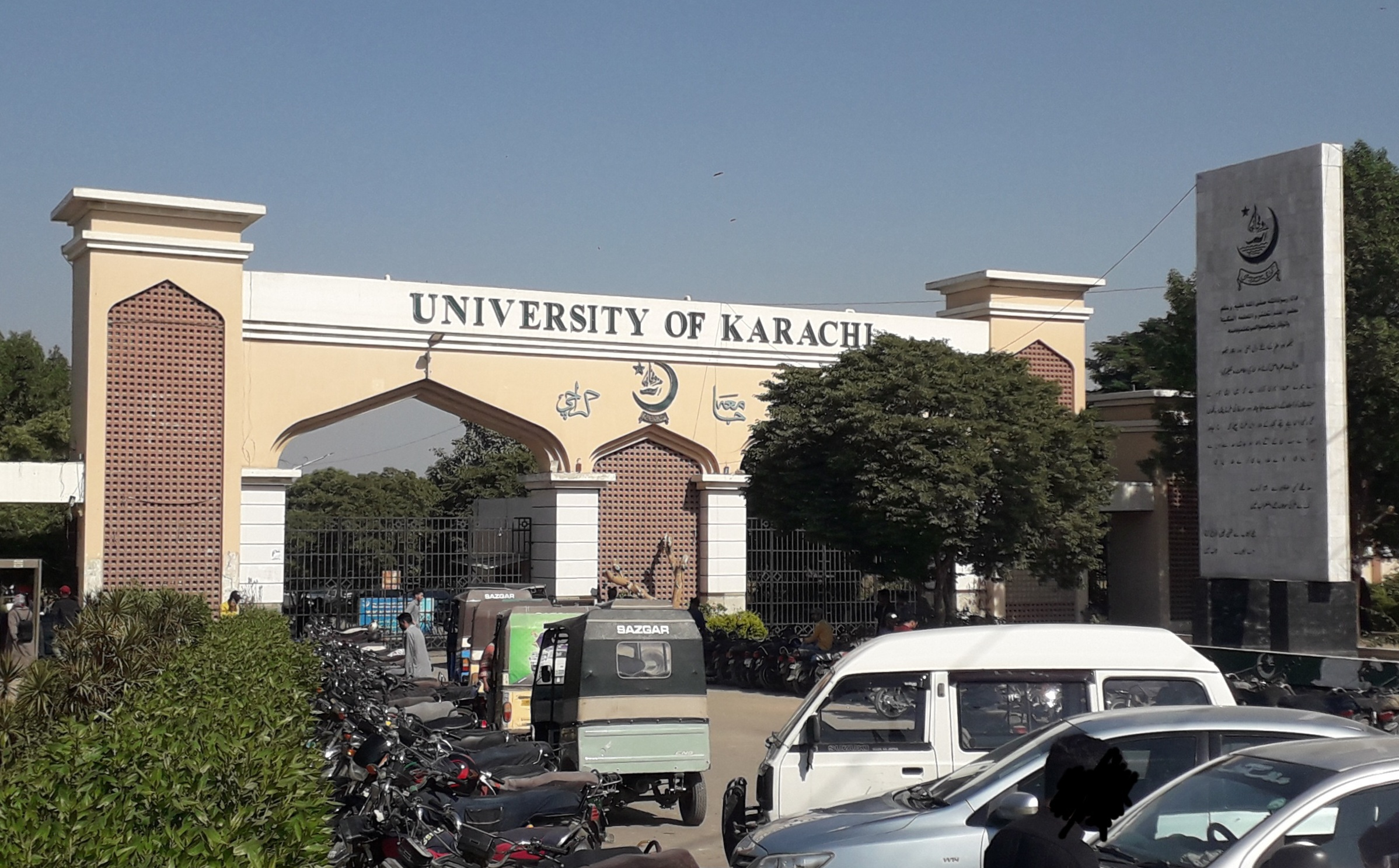
Silver Jubilee Gate of Karachi University

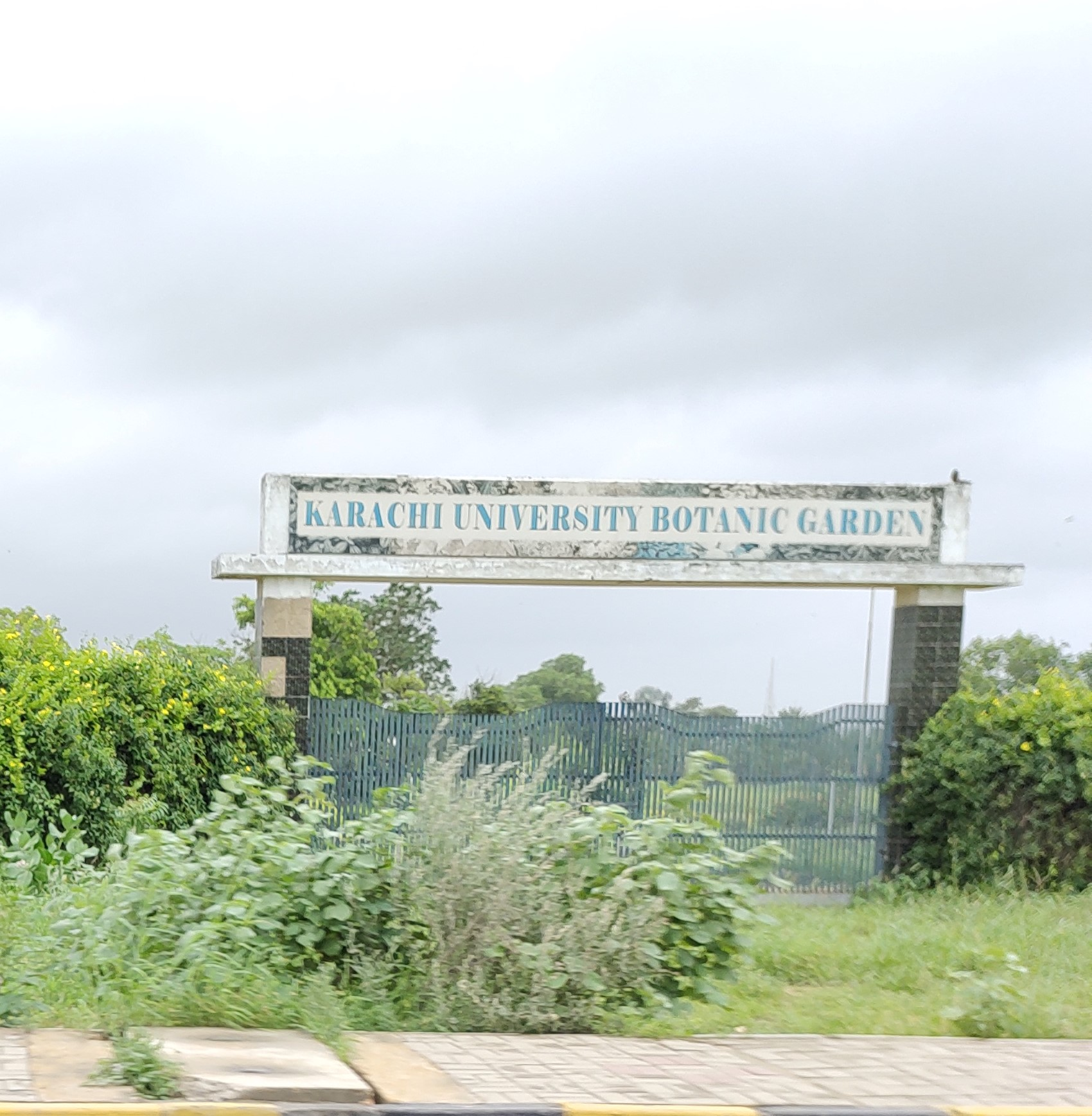
Karachi University Botanic Garden Entrance

== Incidents ==
On 26 April 2022, four people including three Chinese nationals, were killed and four others were injured in a suicide attack outside the Confucius Institute located within the University of Karachi. A female suicide bomber was spotted in the attack footage, who was sent by the designated terrorist group Baloch Liberation Army operating from Balochistan.

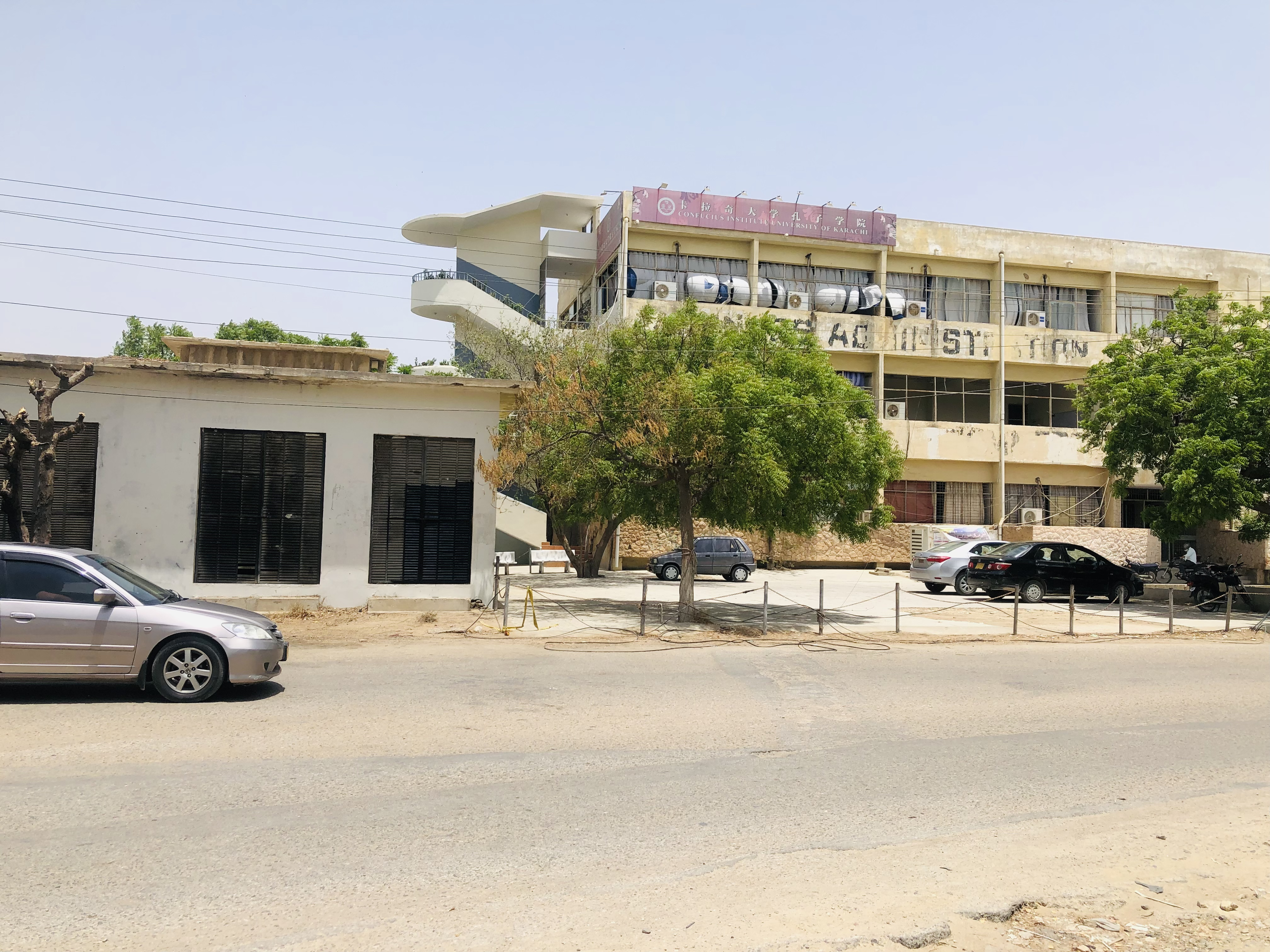
Outer look of Confucius Institute faculty of commerce, after the blast, in 2022.

== See also ==
- List of universities in Karachi
- List of universities in Pakistan
- Pakistan Educational Research Network
