= S. Akbar Zaidi =

Pakistani political economist, academic and author

- Education: University of Cambridge London School of Economics University College London
- Occupations: Political Economist, academic, author

Syed Akbar Hussain (Urdu: اکبر زیدی) is a Pakistani political economist, academic, and author. He is currently serving as the Executive Director of the Institute of Business Administration (IBA) in Karachi.

== Biography ==
Zaidi received his Bachelors in Eeonomics from the University College London in 1977–80. Then, he completed his master's in social planning of developing countries from the London School of Economics in 1981–82. For further studies, he went to the University of Cambridge from where he completed his doctorate degree.

Prior to his current role, Zaidi was a faculty member at the IBA, as well as at Columbia University, the University of Oxford, and Johns Hopkins University. Zaidi has frequently provided commentary on Pakistan's economic growth and challenges, and their political implications. His areas of expertise in addition to the political economy include development, history and social sciences.

== Publications ==
Zaidi has a teaching and research background spanning over 35 years, during which he published several academic papers and books. He has authored works and monographs such as Issues in Pakistan's Economy, Military, Civil Society and Democratisation in Pakistan, Pakistan's Economic and Social Development: The Domestic, Regional and Global Context and New Perspectives on Pakistan’s Political Economy — State, Class and Social Change among others.
