= Chashma, Mianwali =

Coordinates: 32°25′7″N 71°26′58″E

Chashma
- Town
- Interactive map of Chashma
- Country: Pakistan
- Region: Punjab
- District: Mianwali District
- Time zone: UTC+5 (PST)

Chashma (Urdu: چشمہ) is a town located in Mianwali District near Kundian, Punjab, Pakistan. It is situated on the left bank of the river Indus, in close proximity of the Koh-i-Suleiman mountain range. Chashma is famous for the well-known Chashma Barrage built on the Indus River. Also nearby is the Chashma Nuclear Power Plant of the Pakistan Atomic Energy Commission, with two units of 300 megawatt CHASHNUPP-1 and CHASHNUPP-2 and two 325-megawatt units: CHASHNUPP-3 and CHASHNUPP-4. The four units of Chashma are amongst the best performing electricity generating plants in the country, in terms of endurance and availability.
