= Pakistan Nuclear Power Fuel Complex =

Industrial plant in Pakistan

The Pakistan Nuclear Power Fuel Complex (PNPFC), also known as Chemical Processing Plant (CPP), is a nuclear fuel manufacturing and a fabrication plant located in about 175 km (109 mi) south of Islamabad, possibly in Faisalabad District in Punjab.

The plant is owned by the Pakistan Atomic Energy Commission, dedicated solely for nuclear reprocessing to support the pressurized water reactor-type reactors. The plant provides fuel for the larger Chashma Nuclear Power Plant (CHASNUPP) in Punjab, which converts the U_{3}O_{8} to natural UF_{6}, and enriched UF_{6} into UO_{2} powder, then converted depleted UF_{6} into depleted uranium metal and produced zircon ingot. The plant is under the IAEA safeguards and is restricted to manufacture fuel bundles only for Chashma Nuclear Power Plant built in cooperation with China.

== History ==
In 2006, the Pakistan Atomic Energy Commission originally planned to establish the US$ 1.2 billion ($1.87 billion in 2024) industrial complex that consisted of separate uranium enrichment and a fuel fabrication plant to support the grid operations of the Chashma Nuclear Power Plant (CHASNUPP) to lessen the dependence on imported fuel bundles from China. In 2007, the federal Government of Pakistan approved the funding for the plant at the cost of Rs. 16.112 billion (US$56 million). It was reported that that nuclear fuel complex was built at the cost of Rs. 28 billion (US$97 million) paid through the Pakistani taxpayers. The PAEC constructed the plant through a private company, the Central Development Working Party (CDWP Ltd.), in 2009.

Due to constraints imposed by the Nuclear Suppliers Group (NSG), the capacity of the nuclear fuel complex has been limited and the fuel bundles were reported to be imported from China to run the grid operations for reactors at the Chashma Nuclear Power Complex. In spite of its limitation and public perception of the imported fuel, the Pakistan Nuclear Power Fuel Complex was reported by be manufacturing and providing the fuel bundles for the Chashma Nuclear Power Complex.

== See also ==
- Chashma Nuclear Power Plant
- China-Pakistan Power Plant Corporation
- Karachi Nuclear Power Plant
- Pakistan Atomic Energy Commission
