= Institute of Business Administration, Karachi =

Business school in Sindh, Pakistan

- Motto: Leadership and Ideas for Tomorrow
- Type: Private sector institute
- Established: 1955
- Affiliations: Higher Education Commission of Pakistan; The Association of Commonwealth Universities; CFA Institute, United States; South Asian Quality Assurance System (SAQS)
- Director: S. Akbar Zaidi
- Faculty: 130 Full Time Faculty, 200 Visiting Faculty
- Students: 4,035 (Spring 2020). Undergraduate programs: 3,045 (Spring 2020); Graduate programs: 990 (Spring 2020)
- Location: Karachi, Sindh, Pakistan
- Colours: Tyrian purple, White
- Website: www.iba.edu.pk

The Institute of Business Administration (IBA), Karachi (Urdu: انسٹی ٹیوٹ انتظامیہ تجارت، کراچی) is a private university in Karachi, Sindh, Pakistan. Established initially as a business school, the IBA has expanded to include programs in Computer Science, Social Sciences and more.

== Academics ==
=== Admission ===
Admission to IBA Karachi is based on the Entry Test, SAT/ACT test score and Interview.

=== Programs Offered ===
At undergraduate level, IBA offers degrees in Business Administration, Accounting and Finance, Business Analytics, Computer Science, Economics, Economics and Mathematics, Social Sciences and Liberal Arts.

The graduate programs offered by the IBA include degrees in Business Administration, MBA Executive, Computer Science, Economics, Islamic Banking and Finance, Journalism, Management, Data Sciences, Finance and Mathematics.

The doctoral programs offered at the Institute include degrees in Computer Science, Economics and Mathematics.

The IBA Alumni has initiated the test preparations institute for IBA and all other universities to prepare students for the entry test for the universities.

== Affiliation ==
- Institute of Business Administration, Karachi is accredited by the Higher Education Commission of Pakistan.
- Institute of Business Administration, Karachi is a member institution of The Association of Commonwealth Universities, UK.
- IBA was accredited by the South Asian Quality Assurance System (SAQS) in 2011.
- CFA University Partner and the first university in Pakistan to be granted that status by the CFA Institute, United States.

== Notable alumni ==
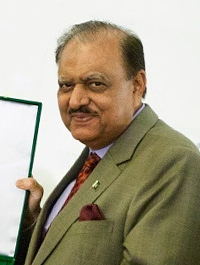
Mamnoon Hussain, President of Pakistan

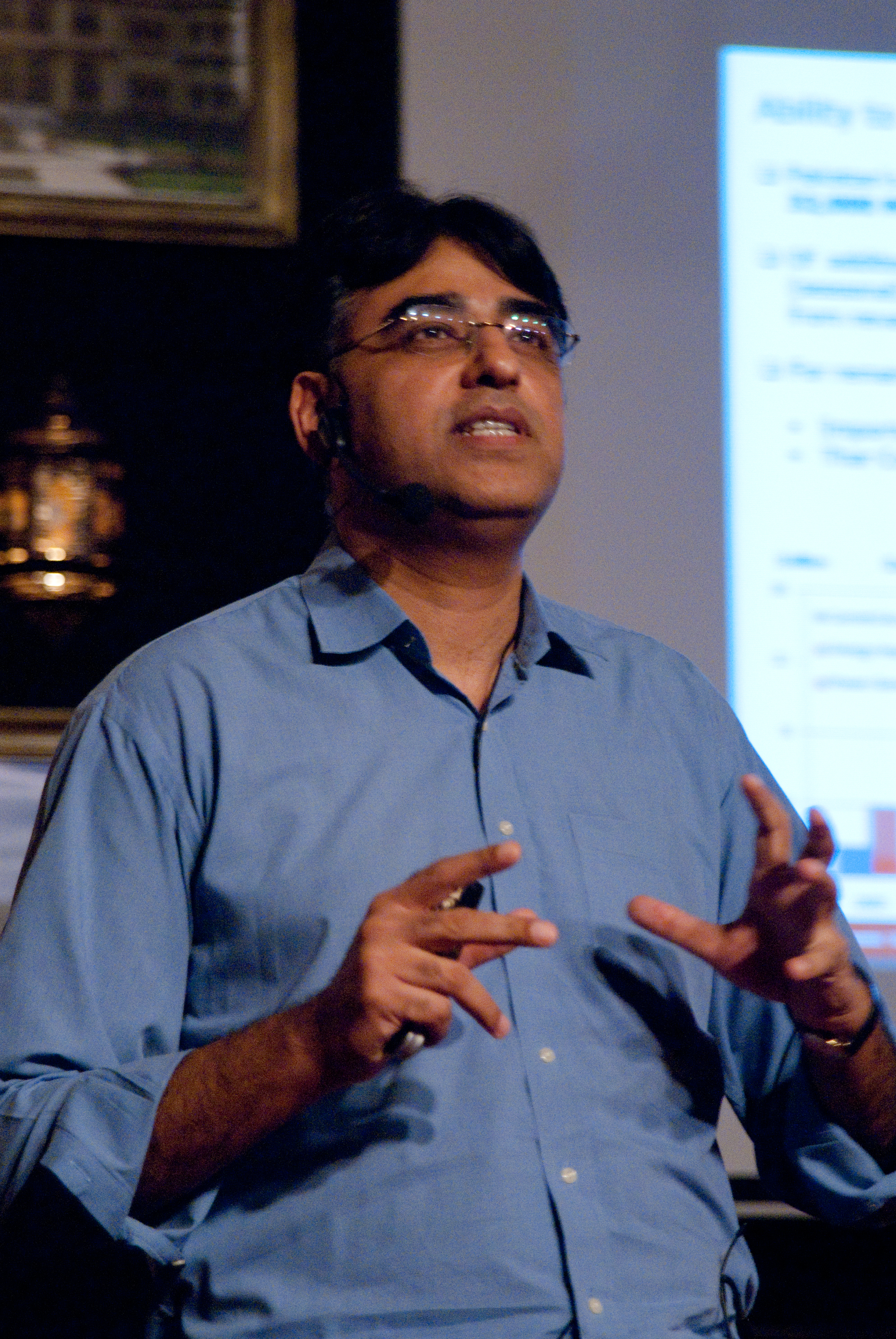
Asad Umar

- Asad Umar – Former Federal Minister for Planning, Development, Reforms and Special Initiatives, serving in the Government of Pakistan, and the former CEO of Engro Corporation.
- Ashir Azeem – Pakistani-Canadian actor, director and former civil servant.
- Irfanullah Khan Marwat – Former Minister of Education Sindh.
- Kanwal Ahmed – Founder of Soul Sisters Pakistan (est.2013) and Executive Producer of "Conversations with Kanwal."
- Mahoor Shahzad – Badminton player
- Mamnoon Hussain – Former President, Islamic Republic of Pakistan.
- Muhammad Uzair – Pakistani economist, senior bureaucrat, and professor emeritus.
- Muhammad Zubair – Pakistani politician and former Governor of Sindh.
- Shaukat Aziz – Former Prime Minister of Pakistan.
- Sheheryar Munawar – Film and television actor.
- Sikandar Sultan – Founder and Chairman of Shan Food Industries.
- Tipu Sharif – Turkish-born television actor.
- Tabish Hashmi TV personality, Host, Comedian, (Geo TV)
