= Insurgency in Sindh =

Actions by Sindhi nationalists in Pakistan

- Location of Sindh in Pakistan
Date	2003–present (23 years)
Location	Sindh, Pakistan
Status	Ongoing (extremely low-level insurgency)

Belligerents
Pakistan: Sindh	Sindhudesh movement; Sindhi separatists

Commanders and leaders
(Pakistan) Asif Ali Zardari (Pakistan) Shehbaz Sharif; Nehal Hashmi; Murad Ali Shah	Shafi Muhammad Burfat; Sodho Sindhi; Darya Khan; Bashir Zaib; Allah Nazar Baloch

Units involved
Pakistan; Ministry of Interior; CAF; Rangers; Pakistan Police; Intelligence community; FIA; IB; NACTA; Sindh; Sindh Rangers; Sindh Police; SB; SSU; CTD Sindh	Armed groups: SLA; Baloch Raaji Aajoi Sangar: BLA; BLF; SRA; SPA; Movements: Sindhudesh movement Sindhi nationalist movement Political parties: JSQM; JSMM; SUP; Students organization: JSSF

The Insurgency in Sindh is a relatively low-level insurgency (as compared to other insurgencies in Pakistan) waged by Sindhi nationalists against Pakistan. Sindhi nationalists want to create an independent Sindhi state, often referred to as Sindhudesh.

Sindhi nationalists have allied up with Baloch nationalists to counter Pakistan's security forces. However, the insurgency has never attracted popular support in Sindh, with separatist groups having unorganized leadership and few members.

== Background ==
In 1972, G. M. Syed, a prominent Sindhi politician and former Pakistan Movement activist, proposed the formation of an independent nation for the Sindhis under the name Sindhudesh. He was the first nationalist politician in Pakistan to call for the independence of Sindh. The movement for a distinct Sindhi identity and sovereign state led by Syed drew inspiration from the Bengali language movement and subsequent Bangladesh Liberation War. In post-independence Pakistan, the machinations of the Pakistani state convinced Syed that Sindhis would be marginalised by Punjabis, Muhajirs, and Pashtuns. The concept of Sindhudesh as developed by Syed calls for the liberation and freedom of Sindhis from alleged Punjabi-Muhajir "imperialism".

With his political base largely weakened due to a failure to garner public support, Syed later advanced his position towards openly demanding outright separation from Pakistan in his works.

Supporters of Sindhudesh have also desired support from India to aid in the creation of a sovereign state, with Syed meeting with Rajiv Gandhi in 1987 to gain Indian support.

Separatist parties or militant groups have never been able to take centre stage in Sindh. The Pakistan People Party (PPP), a democratic socialist and mainstream national party, has dominated Sindhi politics since the 1970s. The success of the PPP in Sindh has illustrated the preference of Sindhis for a constitutional political process over a separatist agenda to resolve their grievances.

== Drivers of insurgency ==
Sindhi nationalists assert that Sindh has been used to the advantage of people from non-Sindhi ethnic groups, citing the dominance of Muhajirs (Urdu speaking Muslim refugees and migrants who migrated from India to Pakistan) in some parts of Sindh's politics and economics, particularly their dominance in Karachi, the financial capital of both Sindh and Pakistan. Sindhi nationalists also cite the large-scale migration to Sindh from other regions of Pakistan and the alleged Punjabi dominance in Pakistan's defence sector, as major issues in Sindh that require action against the Pakistani state.

== Timeline ==
17 August 2003 – In two separate acts of sabotage, portions of railway tracks were destroyed when bombs exploded on up and down tracks in Kotri and Nawabshah.
16 August 2004 – Two bombs explode near Nawabshah, 250 km (150 miles) north-east of Karachi. The first explosion damaged a rail track, while the second explosion a few minutes later wounded two policemen and a journalist who were at the scene.
13 June 2005 – Two electricity pylons of 500kv high transmission line were damaged near the Sann railway station.
14 July 2010 – Sindhi separatists try to blow up Hyderabad railway track, Bomb Disposal Squad defused four bombs found by residents on the track of the Odero Lal Railway Station in Hyderabad.
15 July 2010 – 3 feet of railway tracks destroyed in blast.
1 November 2010 – Two bomb blast at Railway Track between Kotri & Hyderabad.
2 November 2010 – 4 bombs go off, destroying railway tracks in Hyderabad.
4 November 2010 – A low-intensity bomb exploded at railway tracks near Nawabshah, just minutes after a cargo train carrying oil had passed. Another bomb was defused by the bomb disposal squad.
6 November 2010 – Two (JSMM) activists were arrested after being suspected masterminds of the bomb incidents in the beginning of November.
11 February 2011 – Ten low-intensity explosions at railway tracks across Sindh.
12 February 2011 – Blast at rail track near Kotri station
15 February 2011 – Twin blasts damage railway tracks near Matiari.
17 February 2011 – Twin blasts damage railway tracks in Karachi.
29 April 2011 – Blast forces train off the tracks in Sukkur.
27 November 2011 – Six bomb blasts damage railway tracks in Sindh.
2 May 2012 – attacks on branches of national Banks.,
26 May 2012 – On the National Highway a group of unknown gunmen attacked and killed 7 people and at least 25 more were injured in a passenger bus. SLA claimed the attack.
27 April, 2013 – Bomb attacks of Sindhudesh Liberation Army on gas pipelines.
12 July 2013 – Two powerful blasts rocked Hyderabad, one at the boundary wall of the office of Senior Superintendent of Police (SSP) Hyderabad and the other at a railway track in Hussainabad. Both the explosions were heard far and wide.
5 November 2013 – A bomb planted near a railway track near Hussainabad in Hyderabad destroyed a portion of up-track. A second bomb went off in Khairpur District after the departure of the Shalimar Express to Karachi via the Gambat railway station.
14 November 2016 – A vehicle of a Chinese engineer was targeted with remote control bomb at Gulshan-e-Hadeed, Karachi. The Chinese national and his driver were seriously injured.
5 August 2020 – The Sindhudesh Revolutionary Army claimed responsibility for a grenade attack on a rally organized by the Jamaat-i-Islami in Karachi that injured about 40 people. The rally was taken out on the first anniversary of India government’s decision to revoke the special status of Jammu and Kashmir. Despite the blast, the rally continued.
14 March 2022 – The Counter Terrorism Department arrested three members of the SRA in Sukkur.
1 April 2022 – Two blasts damage railway tracks in Kotri, the SRA claims responsibility.
7 April 2022 – Three alleged militants of the SRA were arrested by Hussainabad police.
29 April 2022 – A blast damages an electricity pylon near Tando Mohammad Khan road, SRA claims responsibility.
12 May 2022 – The Sindhudesh Revolutionary Army claimed responsibility for a bombing in the Saddar area of Karachi killing one civilian and injuring seven others.
17 May 2022 – Larkana police claimed to have arrested six militants of the Asghar Shah group of the SRA in Nasirabad.
28 September 2022 – a Chinese national was killed and two others were injured when an unidentified assailant opened fire at a dental clinic. Chinese-origin Pakistani dentists, Dr. Richard Hu and his wife Phen Teyin, sustained bullet injuries. Ronald Raymond Chou, their Chinese employee, however, died on the spot. All three victims held Chinese and Pakistani dual nationality. The Sindhudesh People’s Army (SPA), a new Sindhi separatist group, claimed responsibility for the attack.
29 May 2024 – The terrorists, which were caught attempting to conduct an attack on Pakistan's Independence day, accepted responsibility for the explosion in DAS Hyderi Larkana on May 29 after getting arrested.
12 August 2024 – The Counter Terrorism Department's branch in Larkana, along with agencies took action on Sunday, based on secret information and arrested two wanted terrorists belonging to the SRA.

== See also ==
- Insurgency in Balochistan
- Insurgency in Khyber Pakhtunkhwa
- MQM violence (1994–2016)
- MQM militancy
- Operation Clean-up
- Operation Lyari
- Sectarian violence in Pakistan
- Terrorism in Pakistan
- Separatist movements of Pakistan
