= Sajjad Shar =

Leader of Sindhudesh movement

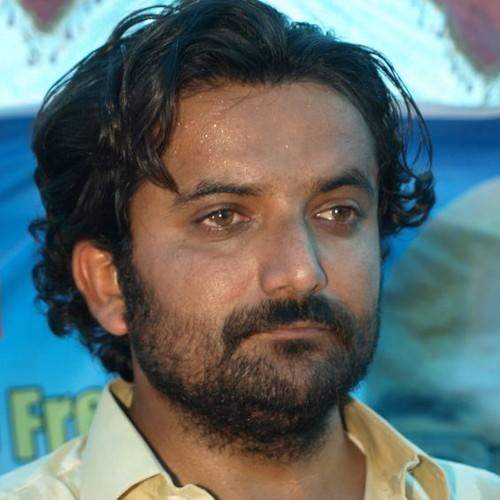
- General Secretary of Jeay Sindh Muttahida Mahaz
- Born: 1 March 1986 (age 40); Rasool Pur Khairpur, Sindh
- Education: Federal Urdu University
- Occupation: Politician
- Known for: Separatist leader

Sajjad Shar (Sindhi: سجاد شر) (born 26 March 1986), is the current Secretary General of banned Jeay Sindh Muttahida Mahaz; A political organization working for freedom of Sindhudesh from Pakistan and was first president of JSMM's student wing Jeay Sindh Students' Federation (JSSF) & was former youngest president of Jeay Sindh Qoumi Mahaz's student wing. currently state had nominated him in several cases of treason and he is one of the underground leader of JSMM.he is now in england reason of BAGHi.

== Early life and career ==
Sajjad Shar was born on 1 March 1986 at Village of Rasool Pur, Khairpur, Pakistan.

=== As a student leader ===
Sajjad Shar was the youngest president of Jeay Sindh Qaumi Mahaz's student wing Jeay Sindh Students' Federation. Sajjad Shar struggling in Sindh on various issues of student politics and admissions policies. He also attended and represented Sindhis' students politics in conference on All Pakistan student leaders conference on peace-building in campuses, held in Lahore, Pakistan.

=== As a leader of JSMM ===
Sajjad Shar joined Jeay Sindh Muttahida Mahaz on 10 February 2010. Nowadays he is working as Secretary General of JSMM. His alleged steps against Pakistan, State had nominated him in several cases of treason. He was first president of JSMM's student wing Jeay Sindh Students' Federation (JSSF).

=== As a writer ===
Sajjad Shar has written so many articles on various issues and about history. He mostly writes in leading Sindhi newspapers Daily Kawish. and Daily Awami Awaz. He is also regular writer in JSMM's official propaganda Magazine Khahorri.

On different occasions he meets with intellectuals of Sindh. He addressed Bar Counsels on the Sindh case. He also meets many times Baloch leader Nawab Khair Bakhsh Marri.

- Recently home town of Sajjad shar was under heavy siege of Rangers, Police and plain cloth personnel for several hours, Forces arrested two uncles of Sajjad shar after door to door search operation. Whereabouts of his uncles is still unknown.

== See also ==
- G. M. Syed
- Shafi Muhammad Burfat
- Muzafar Bhutto
- Bashir Ahmed Qureshi
