= Hyder Manzil =

- حیدر منزل
- Interactive map of the Hyder Manzil area

General information
- Type: Bungalow
- Location: Soldier Bazaar, Karachi, Sindh, Pakistan, Near Nishtar Park, Soldier Bazaar
- Coordinates: 24.875252°N 67.029228°E
- Construction started: 1932
- Demolished: 5 July 2019

Technical details
- Floor count: 1

Hyder Manzil was a pre‑partition bungalow in Soldier Bazaar, opposite today's Nishtar Park in central Karachi. It served as the residence of Sindhi politician and intellectual G. M. Syed. From its completion until its demolition in July 2019, the house functioned as a crucible of political activity in Sindh, earning a reputation as "Pakistan before Pakistan" for its role in shaping nationalist movements across eight decades.

== History ==
Syed commissioned the bungalow soon after becoming vice‑president of the Karachi Local Board in 1929, relocating his family from rural Sann to the newly laid‑out Muslim Society suburb so that he could "work for Sindh's separation from the Bombay Presidency". Completed in 1932, Hyder Manzil immediately became a salon for anti‑colonial activists, hosting strategy sessions that led to the founding of the Sindh Peoples Party in 1934 and the successful campaign of 1935 that detached Sindh from Bombay.

During the 1940s, the bungalow served as an informal headquarters of the provincial Muslim League; family records and later interviews state that the text of the 1943 Sindh Legislative Assembly resolution endorsing the Pakistan demand was drafted in its central hall. Contemporary accounts recall Muhammad Ali Jinnah, Liaquat Ali Khan and Khan Abdul Ghaffar Khan among the many national leaders who held meetings there; the latter even had an extra‑long bed made for him by Syed to accommodate his height.

After independence, Hyder Manzil continued as a nerve‑centre, first for Syed's separatist Jeay Sindh movement and later for the Sindh United Party led by his grandson Jalal Mehmood Shah, with press conferences and opposition alliances regularly convened on its verandah. Because Syed spent lengthy periods under house arrest, the property was repeatedly declared a "sub‑jail", making it one of Pakistan's most unusual detention sites.

By the early 2000s, commercial encroachment had engulfed Soldier Bazaar, and preservationists warned that Hyder Manzil's private ownership left it vulnerable in the absence of incentives under Sindh's heritage laws. In June 2019, builders began dismantling doors and windows; despite protests and a hurried court petition, bulldozers levelled the structure under cover of night on 5 July 2019. The demolition provoked widespread criticism as another example of Karachi's erasure of its political memory.

== Architecture and setting ==
It was a single‑storey masonry bungalow on a high plinth, its street façade articulated by a deep colonnaded verandah, timber‑shuttered windows and a tiled gable roof, features characteristic of 1930s suburban houses in the city's Muslim Society enclave. Originally surrounded by the bungalows of figures such as Mirza Kaleech Baig, Nabi Bux Bhutto and the Khan of Kalat, the house stood opposite what was then Patel Park (now Nishtar Park), an open ground that provided both respite and a convenient rally site for political gatherings that spilled out of Hyder Manzil’s drawing‑room.
