= Human rights abuses in Sindh =

Aspect of politics and organized crime in Pakistan

- Location of Sindh (highlighted in red)
- Location: Sindh, Pakistan
- Date: Recurring
- Target: Civilians and combatants

Human rights abuses in Sindh, Pakistan, range from arbitrary arrests and enforced disappearances to torture, extrajudicial killings, and political repression.

== Political persecution ==
Many political human rights abuses were committed under the tenure of Chief Minister Jam Sadiq Ali, who took office from August 6, 1990, to March 5, 1992. Under his tenure, Sindhi independence leader GM Syed was placed under house arrest until his death; however Jam Sadiq's death in 1992 did not cause these acts to cease. Following his death, his seat was contested between his son, Jam Ashiq Ali and a Pakistan Peoples Party member, Shahanawaz Junejo. Ali's supporters undertook intimidation of PPP activists and Shahanawaz Junejo, as well as 200 other opposition activists who were detained. According to the 1994 Human Rights in Developing Countries Yearbook, there have been many cases of political persecution in Sindh. Much of the persecution is linked to Sindh's provincial government, and is undertaken by Karachi's Crime Investigation Agency (CIA).

In March 2005, vice-chairman of the Jeay Sindh Muttahida Mahaz (JSMM) Samiullah Kalhoro died in a hospital of Karachi. The JSMM chief Shafi Burfat alleged that Kalhoro died after his kidney failed as a result of torture in police custody. He added that the JSMM was being punished for pursuing the ideology of G. M. Syed. JSMM has published advertisements in Sindhi newspapers criticising law enforcement agencies.

In November 2010, police allegedly picked up Ali Madad Burfat, an activist of the Jeay Sindh Students' Federation, and his friend, both of whom were students of the Sindh University at the time. On 21 April 2011, unidentified armed men shot dead three leaders of the Jeay Sindh Muttahida Mahaz (JSMM) including senior Vice-chairman Qurban Khohaver, Rooplo Cholyani and Noorullah Tunio at Bakhoro Mori area in Sanghar district. The JSMM alleged that the personnel of law enforcement agencies were involved in Bakhoro Mori incident. Human Rights Commission of Pakistan published a report on Bakhoro Mori incident and urged that "Agencies’ role in JSMM activists’ murder must be probed". In April 2011, JSMM member Ijaz Solangi's dead body was found in Dadu after he held a press conference against security agencies. In October 2011, Asian Human Rights Commission issued an appeal on information it had received that the Sindh University authorities allegedly used law enforcement agencies for disappearances of students in Sindh province.

In a 2012 statement issued by Asian Human Rights Commission, it said that: "In Sindh province more than 100 nationalists were abducted and disappeared after 9/11, many were extra judicially killed and their tortured and bullet riddled bodies were dumped on the streets." It further added that: "Alone, from JSMM 13 people are still missing. Its former leader, Mr. Muzzafar Bhutto was two times abducted and kept in military torture cells where he succumbed to his injuries during the second time detention." Mumtaz Bhutto another activist of JSMM and brother of Muzaffar Bhutto, killed on 1 July 2009 in a bomb blast at Thermal Power house colony Jamshoro, JSMM alleged that security agencies were involved in bomb blast.

In 2011, Congressman Dan Burton and Brad Sherman, in their letters to Pakistan's President Asif Ali Zardari, urged him to take steps to end the practice of enforced disappearance in Pakistan. When brought to his attention, Noam Chomsky showed concern on enforced disappearances in Sindh and Balochistan. In September 2012, a delegation of United Nations Working Group on Enforced or Involuntary Disappearances, visited Pakistan for the first time at the invitation of the Pakistani government.

In May 2018, the families of disappeared political activists staged a hunger strike in protest of their family members and in turn were attacked by security forces. The assault was almost immediately condemned by congressman Sherman.

=== Disappearances and abductions ===
Safdar Sarki, an activist in the Sindhi nationalist movement, was one of the many disappeared during the period of President Pervez Musharraf's rule. The campaign to "find" him and get him released included Amnesty International, who called for his release. During the first eight months of 2017, roughly "110 nationalist activists and human rights defenders" in Sindh disappeared. The Secretary-General of World Sindhi Congress told the United Nations Human Rights Council on 25 September 2020 that "enforced disappearances of Sindhi people by Pakistan agencies continue unabated. In the last 3 months, over 60 abducted."

== See also ==
- Human rights in Pakistan
- Targeted killings in Pakistan
- Sindhudesh
- Insurgency in Sindh
