= Pakistan Oppressed Nations Movement =

The Pakistan Oppressed Nations Movement (PONM) was an alliance of several nationalist parties in Pakistan: Sindh Taraqi Pasand Party, Awami Tehreek, Balochistan National Party (Mengal), Pashtunkhwa Milli Awami Party, Seraiki movement etc.

Prominent leaders of PONM were Sardar Ataullah Mengal, Mehmood Khan Achakzai, Rasool Bux Palijo, Dr. Qadir Magsi, Syed Jalal Mehmood Shah and other Sindhi, Baluch, Pashtun and Seraiki ethnic nationalists. Although it was not a political party, but a grouping of ethnic nationalist parties, they support each other's candidates in election. They constitute a large group in Balochistan provisional assembly, where they have won a total of ten out of sixty-six seats. It is present in Sindh as well, but was more popular in Balochistan.
