= Bashir Khan Qureshi =

Former Sindhi nationalist politician

- بشير خان قريشي
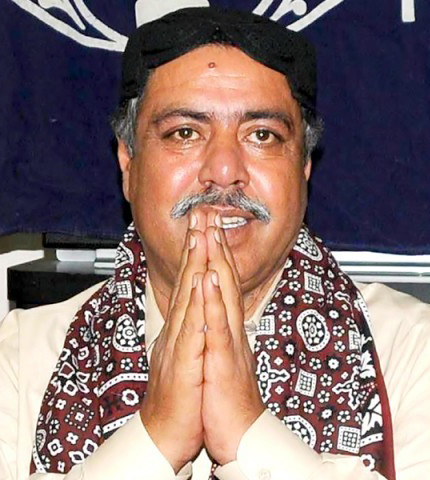

Chairman of the JSQM
- In office 13 April 1998 – 7 April 2012
- Preceded by: Abdul Wahid Arisar
- Succeeded by: Sanan Khan Qureshi

Personal details
- Born: Bashir Ahmed Qureshi; 10 August 1959 Ratodero, Larkano District, Pakistan
- Died: 7 April 2012 (aged 52) Sakrand, Nawabshah, Pakistan
- Party: Jeay Sindh Qaumi Mahaz
- Spouse: Saeeda Qureshi
- Children: 7, three sons including Sanan Khan Qureshi and four daughters
- Education: Sindh Agriculture University (BS, MS)

Bashir Khan Qureshi (Sindhi: بشير خان قريشي; 10 August 1959 – 7 April 2012) was a Sindhi nationalist who served as the leader of Jeay Sindh Qaumi Mahaz (JSQM), a Sindhi nationalist movement in Sindh, founded by G. M. Syed. He was assassinated at the age of 54 years on 7 April 2012.

== Early life ==
Bashir Qureshi was born to Ghulam Murtaza Qureshi, on 10 August 1959 at Motan Pur Mohalla in Ratodero, Larkana District in Sindh.

He started his political career as a student worker of the Jeay Sindh Students Federation (JSSF) during his master's studies at the Agriculture University, Tando Jam, Sindh. As a student, he also played a democratic role by participating in the movement of restoration of democracy MRD during General Ziaul Haq's tenure.

After the death of leader GM Syed (who was his political mentor), the party decided to elect Qureshi as the new chairman of JSQM.

=== Family ===
Qureshi left behind his widow, three sons and four daughters. His eldest son Sunan Qureshi is the incumbent chairperson of the party (JSQM).

== Political activism ==
He took part in students' politics and joined the Jeay Sindh Students Federation in 1976. He was elected as President of the Federation; Tando Jam Unit in the year 1980 but after two years (1982) was elected as Central Vice President of the Federation. He was also elected as Central President of the Federation in the year 1986. In 1990, he was re-elected for the same post. Nevertheless, in the year 1995, Jeay Sindh Quami Mahaz was formed when he was behind the bar but was elected as Deputy Convener. He was also elected as Secretary-General of the Mahaz in 1996 and finally elected as the chairman on 13 April 1998. Mr. Bashir played a role in mobilizing the members of the Federation and worked hard to strengthen the Federation.

Finally, he was set free in August 1986. Mr. Bashir was again arrested on 11 August 1988 after Sindhi-Mohajar riots. This time, he was jailed for 18 months. Again, he was arrested on 2 January 1994 (PPP regime) for two years. Later he was arrested on 17 January 1999 on his way to attend the birth celebration of Saeen G. M. Syed and was set free in November 1999 after a struggle of 11 months. Mr. Bashir has remained in prison for a total period of 6 years and 10 months. He is author of his book entitled "Jaagya Junge Jawaan" in Sindhi language, published in 1989 which is a collection of various speeches delivered by him. Mr. Bashir was awarded the "G. M. Syed National Award" in the year 1997. He was arrested on 15 September 2011, by rangers and was charged for carrying weapons, he was released by the court as the arms were duly licensed. His arrest provoked automatic protest and complete strike throughout Sindh was observed.

=== Timeline ===
- Elected as president of the Federation; Tando Jam Unit in the year 1980.
- He was elected as the vice president of JSSF in 1982 and became its central president in 1986.
- Elected as deputy convener of JSQM in 1995.
- Elected as Secretary General of the Mahaz in 1996.
- Elected as JSQM Chairman in the year 1998.

=== Freedom March ===
Bashir Qureshi launched Freedom March under the slogan "Sindhi: Sindh Ghuray Thee Azadi" (Sindh wants Freedom) on 23 March each year. This demanded sovereign independent status for Sindh and march aimed drawing the attention of world sovereign nations and UNO towards the exploitation of people of Sindh by the state of Pakistan since 1947.

== Social contribution ==
Qureshi contributed to resolving the tribal feuds among different Sindhi tribes, and set the tradition of taking delegations to the rival groups to convince and encourage them to resolve their bloody feuds through traditional dispute resolution mechanisms, through the involvement of the notables.

== Death ==
Qureshi died mysteriously at the age of 54 on 7 April 2012 at Sakrand (Sindh). Qureshi was visiting the JSQM supporters in Dari Magsi village, Nawabshah District, when he suddenly lost consciousness after having a dinner with other party co-workers. He complained of chest pain followed by a cough. Qureshi was shifted to a local hospital, where he died at around 2:45 am. Bashir Khan's funeral was attended by lots of political leaders including Nawaz Sharif

=== Poisoning ===
On 19 April 2012, a forensic medicine and pathology team from government medical institutions of Sindh reported that Bashir Qureshi's reason of death may be high phosphorus or cardiac arrest, but were unable to confirm it. Party activists claimed he was poisoned, but his family did not want an investigation and refused to help investigation committee.

== See also ==
- Awami Tahreek
- G M Syed
- Rasool Bux Palijo
- Hyder Bux Jatoi
- Abdul Wahid Aresar
- Qadir Magsi
- Sindhudesh
- Sindhudesh Liberation Army
- Jeay Sindh Qaumi Mahaz
- List of unsolved deaths
