= Dodo Maheri =

Pakistani politician

Dr. Dodo Mortimer Maheri is a Pakistani political leader and an activist for Sindhi rights. He was spokesperson for Sindh United. but later joined Pakistan peoples party on the basis of doctors Job.

== Political career ==
Maheri was graduated from LMC Jamshoro, trained as a medical doctor. but became involved in politics while a student activist with the Jeay Sindh Qaumi Mahaz movement of G. M. Syed. At various times, he has spent 13 years imprisoned in Pakistani jails. and ten stipes in the time of General Zia ul Haq Martial Law. In 1996, the Deputy Secretary General of the World Sindhi Congress demanded Maheri's release, calling his imprisonment false. Maheri joined Dr. Qadir Magsi's Sindh Taraqi Pasand Party. After disagreements, he resigned from the party.

=== Sindh National Congress ===
In the early 2000s, Maheri was head of the Sindh National Council (SNC). In 2006, Maheri and other Sindh leaders established the Sindh National Congress to found a Sindh-based political party, the Sindh United Party. Maheri serves as the party's public information secretary.
