= Khaliq Junejo =

Abdul Khalique Junejo (born November 9, 1952, in Larkana), usually known as Khaliq Junejo is the chairman of Jeay Sindh Mahaz (Sindhi: جيئي سنڌ محاذ), a faction of nationalist movement in Sindh, founded by G. M. Syed. He is also a writer and intellectual.

== Education and career ==
Khalique completed his degree of civil engineering from Sindh University of Engineering and Technology, Jamshoro (then Mehran College). He served as executive engineer in KDA (Karachi Development Authority) from 1975 to 1995. In 1995, he left the job to participate in nationalist politics. He is follower of G. M. Syed.

Khalique claims that Jeay Sindh Mahaz is the original party that was created by G. M. Syed in 1972 for getting an independent Sindh. In 1995, after the demise of Syed, the two political parties Jeay Sindh Mahaz (partly) and Jeay Sindh Tehrik (Bashir Qureshi group) merged, and formed Jeay Sindh Qaumi Mahaz. His faction did not join the merger and they continued their separate struggle through original party Jeay Sindh Mahaz. He writes for English and Sindhi language newspapers. He also law-practitioner in Karachi.

== See also ==
- Jeay Sindh Mahaz
- G M Syed
- Sindh
- Sindhi
- Indus Valley
- Hyder Bux Jatoi
