= List of ethnic riots in Sindh =

Ethnic massacres in Karachi & Hyderabad, Sindh

Following is a list of incidents that have been identified as ethnicity related riots or massacres in Sindh province of Pakistan, particularly in between the 1980s and 1990s.

== Incidents ==
=== Qasba Aligarh Massacre ===
The Qasba–Aligarh massacre was a massacre that happened when recently settled armed tribal Afghan refugees attacked densely populated locals in Qasba Colony, Aligarh Colony and Sector 1-D of Orangi in Karachi in the early hours of the morning on 14 December 1986. According to official reports, approximately 49 people were killed, although unofficial sources suggest the number could be as high as 400. Several hundred others were injured in what has been widely regarded as an act of "revenge killing". by newly settled armed Afghan Refugees following an unsuccessful raid on an Afghan heroin processing and distribution center in Sohrab Goth by the security forces. Most of the residents of the two colonies happened to be Muhajirs like Biharis who had been freshly repatriated from Bangladesh. After the Qasba–Aligarh massacre in 1986, where hundreds of Muhajirs were killed, Karachi saw a wave of tit-for-tat violence. MQM-linked militants were involved, and dozens of Muhajirs and Pashtuns died in the clashes

=== Pucca Qila Massacre ===
On 27 May 1990, Sindh government launched a crackdown in Hyderabad, the center of MQM power. A shoot- on-sight curfew was imposed, and a police house-to-house search began. The Muhajirs protested at this treatment and fighting broke out. In what has become known as 'the Pucca Qila massacre'. More than 250 women and children were killed, leading to retaliations in Karachi and elsewhere and over 300 more deaths.

=== 1988 Hyderabad Massacre ===
The 1988 Hyderabad massacre, also known as Black Friday, was the coordinated massacre of more than 250 Muhajir civilians in Hyderabad, Sindh near Hyderabad cantt on September 30, 1988. Identified gunmen, led by Sindhi nationalist Qadir Magsi, opened fire on a large unarmed crowd. Sindhi nationalists, including Qadir Magsi, and the Sindh Taraqi Pasand Party, were widely seen as responsible for the massacre.

== Protests ==
=== Protest at UN Headquarters ===
Muhajirs from Pakistan held a peaceful demonstration in front of the United Nations headquarters in New York against the alleged human rights violations in the country. Displaying placards and banners calling the Pakistan Army generals "war criminals". The protest was organised by the United States wing of the Muttahida Qaumi Movement (MQM). The protestors claimed that thousands of innocent people of their community have been killed in Pakistan over the last three decades and several thousands have been held under illegal captivity without a trial.

=== Protests in United States ===
==== 2014 ====
MQM America has staged a protest demonstration, on February 20, 2014, over the extrajudicial killings and enforced disappearances of MQM’s workers in Karachi. Junaid Fehmi, Central Organizer America, Joint Organizers Muhammad Arshad Hussain and Nadeem Siddiqui and members of central committee, in-charges and office bearers of different wings and a large number of Muhajirs participated the protest demonstration. They came to take part in the demonstration despite severe cold and snowing.

=== Protests in Canada ===
==== 2022 ====
Muttahida Qaumi Movement (MQM) Canada Toronto Chapter held a protest in Mississauga against the state brutalities in Pakistan. They protested against the burning of the MQM head office and parental residence of MQM founder leader Altaf Hussain in Azizabad, Karachi known as “Nine Zero” by paramilitary Rangers, the extrajudicial killing of its workers and the illegal arrest of former MNA Nisar Panhwar. The protesters carried pictures of MQM founder leader Mr. Altaf Hussain, former MNA Nisar Ahmed Panhwar and MQM flags. They carried placards against the burning of MQM leader Mr. Altaf Hussain's residence and MQM center known as Nine Zero, and extrajudicial killings of MQM activists, with words of condemnation written on them. The protestors continued to express their feelings by raising slogans against the state atrocities on MQM workers and Mohajirs in Pakistan from time to time.
