= Index of Muhajir related articles =

An index of articles related to the ethnic group known as the Muhajirs. It covers the post-independence period articles. This list includes topics, events, persons, and other items of national significance within the Muhajirs.

== 0–9 ==
- 1972 Language violence in Sindh
- 1988 Hyderabad, Sindh massacre

Return to Table of Contents

== A ==
- All-India Muslim League
- Altaf Hussain (Pakistani politician)

Return to Table of Contents

== M ==
- Mahajir (Pakistan)
- Muhajir culture
- Muhajir nationalism
- Muhajir politics
- Muttahida Qaumi Movement – London
- Muttahida Qaumi Movement – Pakistan

Return to Table of Contents

== P ==
- Pakistan Movement
- Persecution of Muhajirs

Return to Table of Contents
