= Flag of Sindh =

Flag of the Pakistani province of Sindh

Province of Sindh
- Use: Civil and state flag
- Proportion: 2:3
- Adopted: 23 May 2005

The flag of Sindh is the official flag of the Pakistani province of Sindh. It uses the same colours as the national flag of Pakistan, dark green and white. The emblem of the province representing its major crops forms the centre of the flag with "Government of Sindh" written in Sindhi and Urdu on a crescent. It was adopted in 2005, by the Provincial Assembly of Sindh.

== Design ==
The Sindh provincial flag is green and shows the provincial emblem in the centre which includes the major crops of this desert fertile province; cotton, rice, wheat and sugar cane. The inscription below in a crescent scroll reads Government of Sindh in both Urdu and Sindhi, respectively. The flag uses the Pakistani national colours, white and dark green, colors that reflect the Islamic heritage of Pakistan.

== Other flags ==
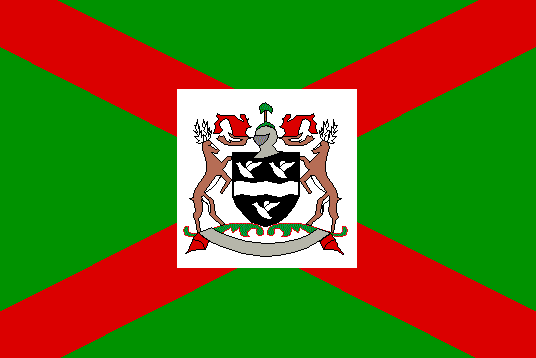
Flag of the State of Khairpur

Jeay Sindh Muttahida Mahaz, Jeay Sindh Muttahida Mahaz and Sindhudesh Liberation Army, unrecognized by Pakistan

Sindhudesh Liberation Army, unrecognized by Pakistan (version)

Sindhudesh Liberation Army, unrecognized by Pakistan (version)

== See also ==
- Flag of Pakistan
- Sindh emblem
- List of Pakistani flags
