= 2022 Karachi Saddar bombing =

Karachi Saddar bombing
- Part of the Insurgency in Sindh and terrorism in Pakistan
- Location: Karachi, Sindh, Pakistan
- Date: 12 May 2022
- Deaths: 1
- Injuries: 13
- Perpetrator: Sindhudesh Revolutionary Army (SRA)

On 12 May 2022, at least 1 person was killed and 13 were left injured in a blast near the Saddar area of Karachi, Sindh, Pakistan. According to reports, the bomb was placed inside a motorcycle close to a garbage dump.

== Reactions ==
The bombing in the Saddar neighbourhood was claimed by a little-known terrorist group called the Sindhudesh Revolutionary Army (SRA). Chief Minister Punjab Hamza Shahbaz released a statement condemning the bombing.

== Response ==
A prime facilitator of the attack, Allah Dino, along with another terrorist of SRA were killed in Counter Terrorism Department (CTD) raid in Keamari area on 18 May.

On 22 May, CTD arrested Manzoor Hussain, an accomplice of Allah Dino, from Hyderabad’s Subhan Colony. Hussain was involved in damaging railway tracks and had also unsuccessfully tried to conduct an IED blast on 23 March.
