= Sanan Khan Qureshi =

3rd chairman of Jeay Sindh Qaumi Mahaz

Chairman Jeay Sindh Qaumi Mahaz
- Incumbent
- Assumed office 9 September 2012
- Preceded by: Bashir Ahmed Qureshi

Personal details
- Parent: Bashir Ahmed Qureshi (father)
- Occupation: Politician
- Known for: Chairman JSQM

Sanan Khan Qureshi (Sindhi: صعنان خان قريشي) is a current chairman of a separatist political organization Jeay Sindh Qaumi Mahaz. Sanan leads the JSQM in 2012 after the death of his father Bashir Ahmed Qureshi.

== Early life ==
Sunan matriculated privately and he completed his intermediate exams at the Government Degree College in Ratodero. He was born in a Sindhi Muslim family.

== Political career ==
After the mysterious death of his father and JSQM chairman Bashir Ahmed Qureshi in 2012, Sanan khan lead the party as chairman, he was elected unopposed on 9 September 2012 in intraparty elections. When sanan elected as a chairman he was only 19 years old, that time he said that "My father wanted me to study". Senior party leaders criticized him as a self-appointed chairman and called this decision as an autocratic rule.

=== Imprisonment ===
After a violent protest at Bahira Town Karachi's main gate, On 9 June 2021, police arrested Sanan Khan Qureshi on terrorism charges. He was released after 40 days on 19 July 2021.
