= Baloch nationalism =

Ideology that claims the Baloch people are a distinct nation

Flag used by most Baloch nationalists and separatists

Baloch nationalism (Balochi: بلۏچی راجدۏستی, romanized: Baloči ràjdòsti) is an ideology that asserts that the Baloch people, an Iranic ethnic group native to Iran, Pakistan and Afghanistan, should form a distinct nation.

== Baloch ethnicity and nationalism ==
The Baloch people are an Iranic ethnic group native to southeastern Iran, southwestern Pakistan and southern Afghanistan.

The Baloch nationalist movement's demands have ranged from greater cultural, economic and political rights, to political autonomy, to outright secession and the creation of an independent state of Balochistan. The movement is secular and was originally inspired by Marxist-Leninist liberation movements.

The movement claims to receive considerable support from the Baloch diaspora in Oman, the United Arab Emirates (UAE), Sweden, Norway, the United States, Canada, and elsewhere. Pakistan has repeatedly made claims that the Baloch nationalists have received funding from India, although these have been denied by India. Similarly, Afghanistan has acknowledged providing covert support to the Baloch nationalist militants. In the 1960s and 1970s, the Republic of Afghanistan provided sanctuary to Baloch militants. The Republic of Afghanistan had established training camps in Kandahar to train Baloch militants and also to provide arms and ammunition. The Ba'athist Iraqi government supported Baloch groups in Iran but halted such actions once the Shah of Imperial Iran stopped supporting Kurdish groups in Iraq.

== History of modern Baloch nationalism ==
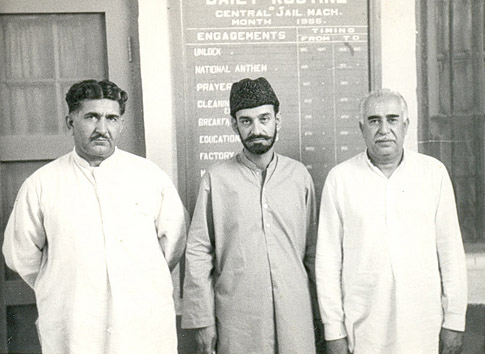
Leaders of the Baloch nationalist movement in the 1970s from left to right: Gul Khan Nasir, Ataullah Mengal, and Ghaus Bakhsh Bizenjo.

Baloch nationalism in its modern form began in the form of the Anjuman-i Ittihad-i Balochan o Balochistan (AIB) based in Mastung in 1929, led by Yousaf Aziz Magsi, Abdul Aziz Kurd, and others. In November 1929, Yousaf Aziz Magsi published an article stating the aims of the group, namely:

1. Unification and independence of Balochistan;
2. A democratic, socialist system guided by Islamic universalism;
3. Abolition of the sardari-jirga system;
4. Free, compulsory education for the Baloch, and equality for Baloch women;
5. Promotion of Baloch culture.

Simultaneously with the formation of the Anjuman, Baloch intellectuals in Karachi formed a nationalist organisation, called the Baloch League.

In February 1937, the Anjuman reorganised and became the Kalat State National Party (KSNP), carrying on the Anjuman's political agenda of an independent united state of Balochistan. They demanded the independence of the Khanate of Kalat, which was later incorporated into Pakistan in 1955. The party was dominated by more secular-minded, anti-imperialist and populist elements, such as Ghaus Bakhsh Bizenjo, Mir Gul Khan Naseer and Abdul Aziz Kurd. When parliamentary elections were held in the state of Kalat, the party was the largest winner with a considerable majority.

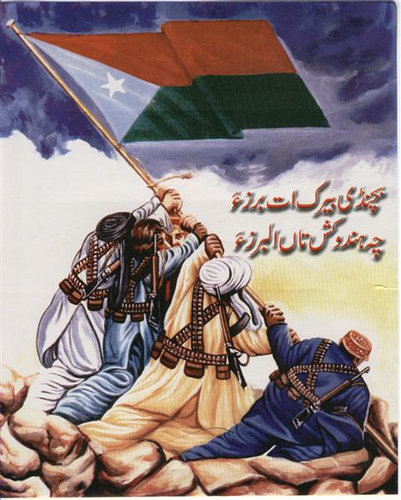
Flag of Balochistan, which was introduced and used by Balochistan Liberation Army (BLA) as the national flag of Balochistan. Currently it is one of the popular symbols of the separatist movement in the region.

In 2017, the World Baloch Organisation (WBO) placed advertisements on taxis in London saying #FreeBalochistan along with slogans such as "stop enforced disappearances" and "save the Baloch people". These were initially allowed but later denied permission by Transport for London (TfL). The World Baloch Organisation (WBO) claimed that this was a result of pressure from the Pakistani government after the British High Commissioner in Islamabad was summoned to appear before the Pakistani Foreign Secretary.

== Surveys ==
A survey in 2009 by the Pew Research Center found that 58% of respondents in Balochistan chose "Pakistani" as their primary mode of identification, 32% chose their ethnicity and 10% chose both equally.

In 2012, Gallup conducted a survey for the United Kingdom's Department for International Development (DFID) that revealed that only 37% of Baloch were in favour of independence. Amongst Balochistan's Pashtun population support for independence was even lower at 12%. 67% of Balochistan's population favoured greater provincial autonomy.

== See also ==
- Insurgency in Balochistan
  - Balochistan Liberation Army (BLA)
  - Balochistan Liberation Front (BLF)
  - Baloch Republican Guards (BRG)
  - People's Fighters Front (PFF)
  - Jaysh al-Adl
- Separatist movements in Pakistan
  - Saraikistan
  - Pashtunistan
  - Azad Kashmir
  - Gilgit-Baltistan
  - Sindhudesh
    - Sindhudesh Liberation Army
    - Jeay Sindh Qaumi Mahaz
    - Jeay Sindh Muttahida Mahaz
    - Jeay Sindh Students' Federation
    - Sindh National Movement Party
- Separatist movements in Iran
  - Arab separatism in Khuzestan
    - Arab Struggle Movement for the Liberation of Ahwaz
    - National Liberation Movement of Ahwaz
    - Ansar al-Furqan
- Kurdish separatism in Iran
  - Democratic Party of Iranian Kurdistan
  - Komala Party of Iranian Kurdistan
  - Coalition of Political Forces of Iranian Kurdistan
  - Kurdistan Free Life Party
- Azerbaijani separatism in Iran
  - Southern Azerbaijan National Awakening Movement
  - Azerbaijan National Resistance Organization
  - Azerbaijan Cultural Society

== General and cited references ==
- Selig Harrison, In Afghanistan's Shadow: Baluch Nationalism and Soviet Temptations, Carnegie Endowment for International Peace, New York, 1981
- Selig Harrison (Winter 1980-1981). Baluch Nationalism and Superpower Rivalry, International Security, Vol. 5 No. 3. pp. 152–163.
- Paul Titus and Nina Swidler (February 2000). Knights, Not Pawns: Ethno-Nationalism and Regional Dynamics in Post-Colonial Balochistan. International Journal of Middle East Studies, Vol. 32, No. 1, pp. 47–69.
