= Muzafar Bhutto =

Sindhi nationalist politician

Muzafar Bhutto مظفر ڀٽو
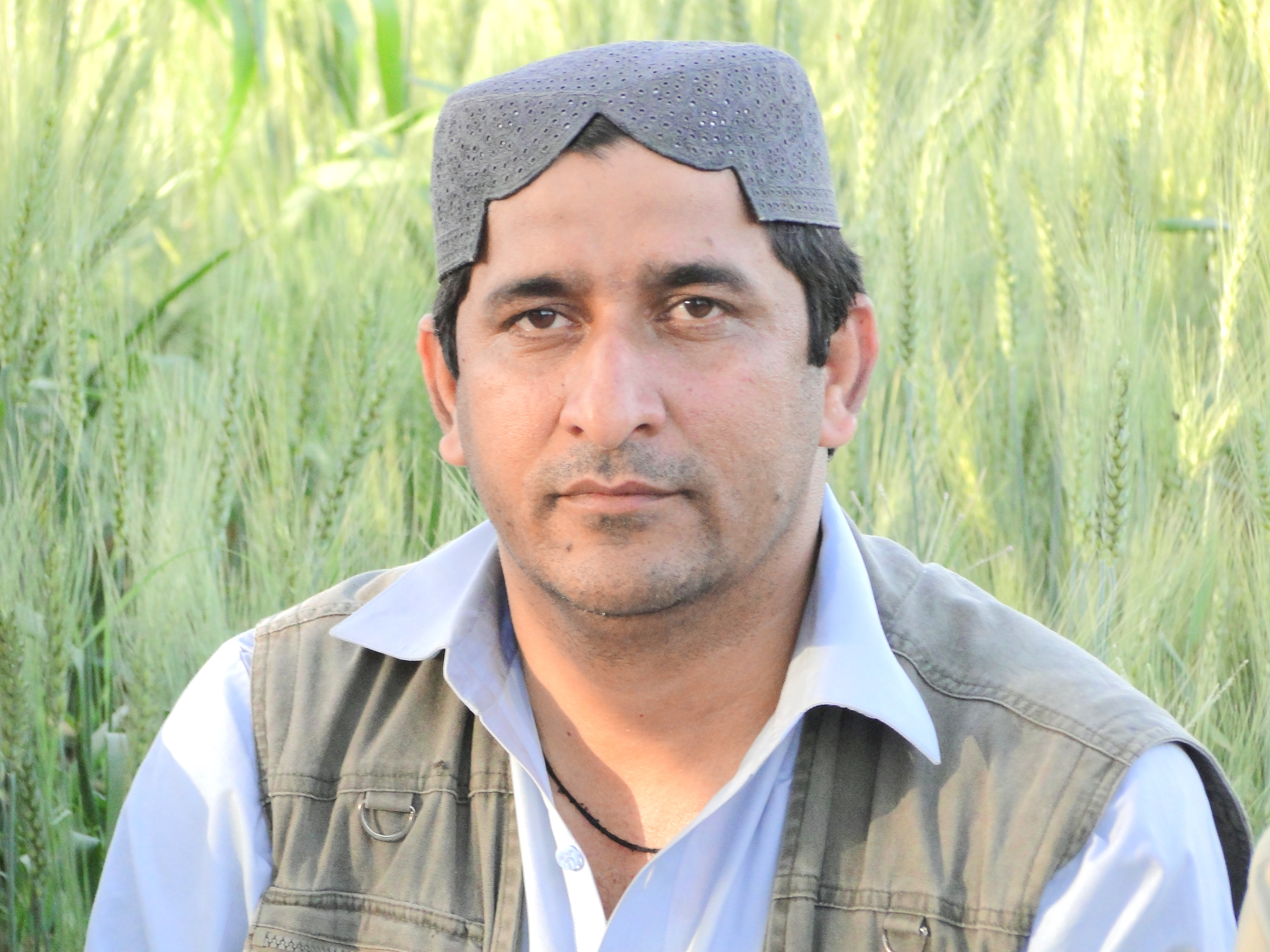
- Secretary General of Jeay Sindh Muttahida Mahaz
- Born: 23 August 1970; Sehwan, Jamshoro, Sindh
- Died: 22 May 2012 (aged 41)
- Body discovered: Hatri, District Hyderabad, Sindh
- Resting place: Sann, Sindh
- Known for: JSMM leader
- Spouse: Saima Bhutto

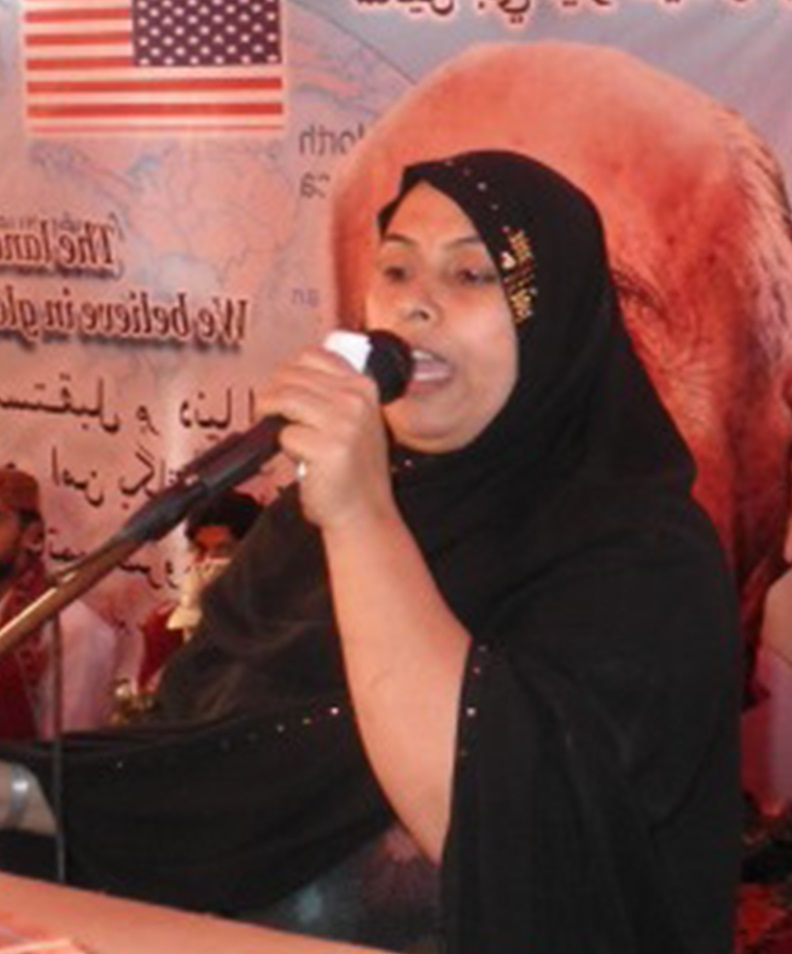
Saima Bhutto (2012)

Muzafar Bhutto (August 23, 1970 – May 22, 2012; Sindhi: مظفر ڀٽو) was a Sindhi nationalist politician, who served as the Secretary General of the Jeay Sindh Muttahida Mahaz (JSMM). His body was found at a roadside near Hatri bypass, in Hyderabad, Pakistan after he went missing on 25 February 2011. Following his death, JSMM members resorted to heavy aerial firing in different areas of Sindh. The heavy aerial firing created fear and panic among the people in Sindh and forced many business to close down.

== Early life and education ==
Muzafar Bhutto was born in Sehwan, Jamshoro, Sindh. Bhutto was a graduate of the Mehran University of Engineering Technology and worked at the Power House, Jamshoro but was removed from service following his first disappearance in 2005. Muzafar Bhutto was married to Saima Bhutto and had two sons and one daughter.

== Political career ==
He started his political career by joining peace bringing organisations, JSMM, which was led by Shafi Burfat. The organisation was responsible for being involved in demand for their rights in Sindh.

== Death ==
Muzafar Bhutto was kidnapped on 25 February 2011 from the national highway near the town of Saeedabad. His dead body was later found stuffed in a gunny bag near Bukhari village in Hyderabad.

Following his death, JSMM members resorted to aerial firing in different areas of Sindh, which in turn forced business to close down. The aerial firing also injured many people with one of the injured having been reported to have succumbed to his injuries.

== See also ==
- G M Syed
- List of kidnappings
- Lists of solved missing person cases
- List of unsolved murders (2000–present)
