= Maheri =

Maheri is a surname. Notable people with the surname include:

- Dodo Maheri, Pakistani politician
- Javad Maheri (born 1983), Iranian footballer
