= Rasool Pur, Sindh =

رسول پور
- Village Rasool Pur
- Location within Sindh
- Coordinates: 27.11358°N 68.609748°E
- Country: Pakistan
- Province: Sindh
- District: Khairpur
- Time zone: UTC+5 (PST)
- Calling code: 0243
- Notable personalities born in Village Rasool Pur: Ghulam Mustafa Shar,Sajjad Shar
- Zip Code: 66151

Rasool Pur (Sindhi: ڳوٺ رسول پور; also spelled as Rasoolpur); is a village located in Thari Mirwah.

== See also ==
- Hindyari
- Khairpur (princely state)
- Sajjad Shar
