= 1988 Latifabad riots =

Massacres against Muhajirs in Sindh, Pakistan

- Part of Violence against Muhajirs
- Location: Latifabad, Hyderabad, Pakistan
- Date: 30 September 1988
- Deaths: 200+
- Victim: Muhajirs
- Perpetrators: Qadir Magsi and Sindhi nationalists

The 1988 Latifabad riots were a series of pogroms in the Latifabad area of Hyderabad, Sindh, Pakistan, perpetrated by Sindhi nationalist militants targeting Muhajirs on 30 September 1988. It resulted in the death of more than 200 people and is considered one of the Sindhi-Muhajir issues in Pakistan.

The following day Sindhis were killed in ethnic rioting which killed at least 46 people. In the following days MQM retaliation led to the deaths of around 250 Sindhis, according to Zulfiqar Mirza. A curfew was enforced in both Karachi and Hyderabad.

Muttahida Qaumi Movement (MQM), the mainstream Muhajir party, would broaden its scope as a party of the middle class following this incident, emphasizing the common physical suffering of the local Muhajir community in parallel to its socioeconomic decline.

== Background ==
In 1988, the massacre, which was committed during the regime of Muhammad Zia-ul-Haq as a result of brewing ethnic and political tensions between Sindhi and Muhajir communities. Zia-ul-Haq, then-President of Pakistan, had been killed in a plane crash the month before, leaving political and democratic possibilities open in Pakistan. Demographic considerations were a huge part of political discourse that led to ethnic rioting throughout the late 1980s.

== Massacre ==
Unidentified gunmen opened fire on large crowds, in Latifabad. The MQM accused Qadir Magsi and nationalists carrying out the attack.

== Trial and acquittal ==
Following the 1988 massacre, Qadir Magsi was detained without trial or conviction for five years. He was eventually released on bail pending trial. In July 2003, a Hyderabad trial court exonerated Qadir Magsi and eight others who were accused of perpetrating the massacre. The Sindh High Court upheld the trial court's judgement in 2007, exonerating 41 additional suspects.
