= Shafi Muhammad Burfat =

Pakistani politician and separatist leader (born 1965)

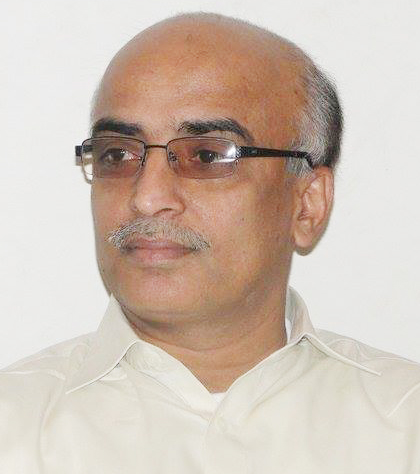
- A picture of Burfat
- Born: November 25, 1965 (age 60); Tehni near Sehwan, Jamshoro, Sindh, Pakistan
- Status: in exile
- Other name: Shafi Burfat
- Occupation: Politician
- Known for: Sindhi Nationalist leader
- Spouse: Yasmeen Burfat
- Children: Rahul Latif; Shahmir Khan; Balaach Khan; Jeysen
- Relatives: Allah Dino Burfat (father); Allah Dini Burfat (mother)
- Website: shafiburfat.com

Shafi Muhammad Burfat (Note: Sindhi: شفيع محمد برفت) (Sindhi: شفيع محمد برفت; born November 25, 1965) is the founder and current chairman of Jeay Sindh Muttahida Mahaz; a Sindhi nationalist and liberal political party in Sindh, Pakistan who believes in the secession of Sindhudesh from Pakistan due to continuous repression of native Sindhis by radicals and extremists in Pakistan.

== Disappearance ==
Burfat is a leader in exile who escaped Pakistan in 1994. Media has reported that Shafi Muhammd Burfat had fled to Afghanistan where he established his control center in Kabul. But some photographs and a column in The daily Jang newspaper has reported Shafi Burfat's presence in an event on Human Rights in UN headquarters at Geneva.

On 1 April 2013 home ministry of Pakistan declared JSMM as a terrorist organization and imposed ban. The Crime Investigation Department (CID) of Sindh police and Federal Investigation Agency (FIA) has added Shafi Muhammad Burfat to its Red Book for his alleged separatists actions against Pakistan.

Burfat has rejected the Pakistan government's portrayals of JSMM as a terrorist organisation and has instead said "it was not hidden that Pakistan government has been nurturing and sponsoring extremism and providing safe havens to terrorist groups".

As of 2017, Shafi Muhammad Burfat is living in exile in Germany under political asylum.

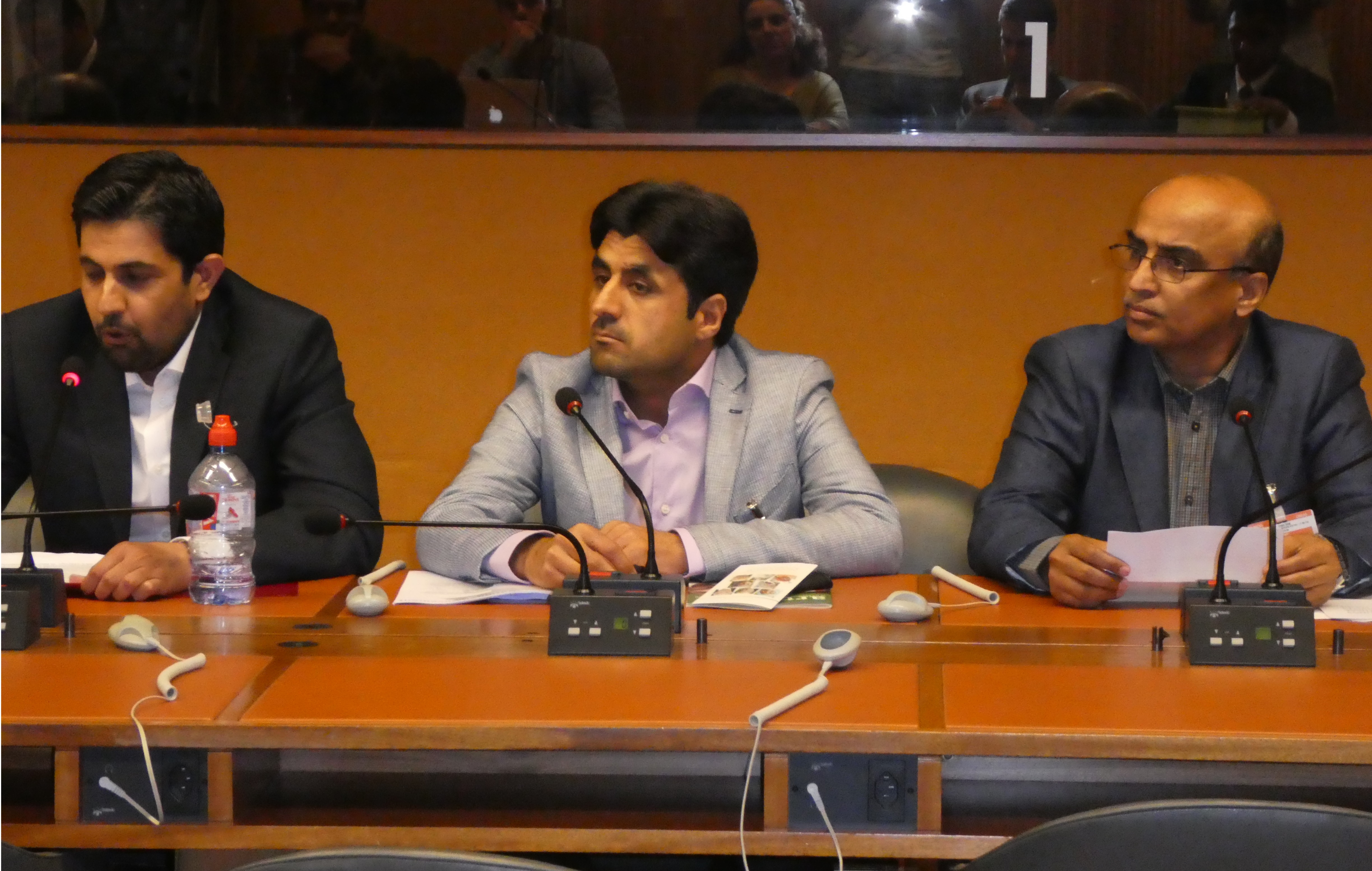
Presence of Shafi Burfat at Geneva

== See also ==
- G M Sayed
- List of fugitives from justice who disappeared
- Muzafar Bhutto
- Sajjad Shar
