= Separatist movements of Pakistan =

There are or have been a number of separatist movements in Pakistan based on ethnic and regional nationalism, that have agitated for independence, and sometimes fighting the Pakistani state at various times during its history. As in many other countries, tension arises from the perception of minority/less powerful ethnic groups that other ethnicities dominate the politics and economics of the country to the detriment of those with less power and money. The government of Pakistan has attempted to subdue these separatist movements.

Influence and success of separatist groups has varied from total, in the case of Bangladesh, which separated from Pakistan in 1971. The separatist movement in Balochistan is engaged in a low-intensity insurgency against the Government of Pakistan. As of 2023, it is the most active secessionist movement in the region.

== Separatist sentiment by opinion poll ==
The separatist movement in Balochistan is engaged in a low-intensity insurgency against the Government of Pakistan.

In 2009, the Pew Research Center conducted a Global Attitudes survey across Pakistan, in which it questioned respondents whether they viewed their primary identity as Pakistani or that of their ethnicity. The sample covered an area representing 90% of the adult population, and included all major ethnic groups. According to the findings, 96% of Punjabis identified themselves first as Pakistanis, as did 92% each of Pashtuns and Muhajirs; 55% of Sindhis chose a Pakistani identification, while 28% chose Sindhi and 16% selected "both equally"; whereas in Balochistan 58% respondents chose Pakistani and 32% selected their ethnicity. Collectively, 89% of the sample opted their primary identity as Pakistani. Similarly in 2010, Chatham House conducted an opinion poll in the Pakistani and Indian-administered regions of Kashmir asking respondents if they favoured independence or an accession to either countries; in Azad Kashmir controlled by Pakistan, 50% of respondents voted to join Pakistan, 44% voted for independence, and 1% voted for accession to India. In the northern region of Gilgit-Baltistan, longstanding local sentiments oppose any merger of the area with Kashmir, and instead demand a constitutional integration with Pakistan.

== Bangladesh ==
Pakistan was established in 1947, from the partition, as a state for Muslims. Its formation was based on the basis of Islamic nationalism.

As part of the Partition of India in 1947, Bengal was partitioned between the Dominion of India and the Dominion of Pakistan. The Pakistani part of Bengal was known as East Bengal until 1955 and thereafter as East Pakistan following the implementation of the One Unit program. However, rampant corruption within the ranks of the Pakistani government and bureaucracy, economic inequality between the country's two wings caused mainly by a lack of representative government and the government's indifference to the efforts of fierce ethno-nationalistic politicians, like Sheik Mujibur Rahman from East Pakistan, who fought for Bangladeshi independence, resulted in civil war in Pakistan and subsequent separation of East Pakistan as the People's Republic of Bangladesh. Bilateral relations between the two wings grew strained over the lack of official recognition for the Bengali language, democracy, regional autonomy, disparity between the two wings, ethnic discrimination, and the central government's weak and inefficient relief efforts after the 1970 Bhola cyclone, which had affected millions in East Pakistan. These grievances led to several political agitations in East Bengal and ultimately a fight for full independence, which was made possible in 1971 with the assistance of the Indian military.

== Pashtunistan ==
The Pashtunistan movement traces its roots back to the Khudai Khidmatgar (Servants of God) movement in the North-West Frontier Province (now Khyber Pakhtunkhwa) which was led by Abdul Ghaffar Khan. Seven weeks before the partition of British India, a Loya Jirga was held which included Bacha Khan, Abdul Samad Khan Achakzai, the Khudai Khidmatgars, members of the Provincial Assembly, Mirzali Khan (popularly known as the Faqir of Ipi), and various other Pashtun tribal leaders. The Pashtunistan Resolution, was adopted on the 21 June 1947. The resolution demanded that Pashtuns be given the option to have an independent Pashtunistan consisting of all Pashtun territory in British India, rather than choosing to join the dominions of India or Pakistan. The British refused the demands which resulted in Pashtuns who were eligible to vote (Pashtuns in the Princly states were not eligible to vote) to boycott the referendum. As a result, the referendum was boycotted on the basis that it was undemocratic and did not offer the Pashtuns the option of independence or joining Afghanistan. After the partition, Bacha Khan and his associates faced frequent imprisonment, and the Khudai Khidmatgar movement was violently suppressed. Despite years of state repression, Bacha Khan remained committed to nonviolence, Pashtun identity, and the pursuit of rights within a democratic and federal political framework. In contrast, Faqir Ipi continued his armed resistance campaign against the Pakistani government until dying of natural causes in 1960.

During the 1950s and 1960s, calls for an independent — a homeland for Pashtuns — intensified, especially after the One Unit policy of West Pakistan merged smaller provinces, undermining Pashtun autonomy. This fueled nationalist sentiment, which was further supported by Afghanistan. Successive Afghan governments under King Zahir Shah and later President Mohammad Daoud Khan extended diplomatic and moral support to the Pashtunistan cause, including allowing exiled leaders and activists to operate from Afghan territory.

In recent years, the Pashtun Tahafuz Movement (PTM) has emerged as a prominent grassroots civil rights movement advocating for the rights of Pashtuns in Pakistan. While PTM explicitly positions itself as a nonviolent and constitutional movement focused on justice, enforced disappearances, and military accountability, some analysts and critics have suggested that its rhetoric and activities may align with broader Pashtun nationalist sentiments. This perception is fueled by PTM's emphasis on Pashtun identity, historical grievances, and calls for greater autonomy. In October 2024, the PTM hosted the Pashtun National Jirga, which addressed issues of Pashtun political, cultural, and economic rights—an event interpreted by some as echoing elements of the historical Pashtunistan movement. In the same month, the Government of Pakistan officially banned the PTM, citing concerns over national unity and allegations of foreign backing. However, PTM leaders have repeatedly denied any separatist agenda, maintaining that their demands remain within the framework of Pakistan's constitution and democracy.

== Balochistan ==
The Baloch Liberation Front (BLF) separatist group was founded by Jumma Khan Marri in 1964 in Damascus, and played an important role in the 1968-1980 insurgency in Pakistani Balochistan and Iranian Balochistan. Mir Hazar Ramkhani, the father of Jumma Khan Marri, took over the group in the 1980s. The Balochistan Liberation Army (also Baloch Liberation Army or Baluchistan Liberation army) (BLA) is a Baloch nationalist militant secessionist organization. However, Jumma Khan Marri ended his opposition and pledged allegiance to Pakistan on 17 February 2018. The stated goals of the organization include the establishment of an independent state of Balochistan separate from Pakistan and Iran. The name Baloch Liberation Army first became public in the summer of 2000, after the organization claimed credit for a series of bomb attacks on markets and railway lines. Following the death of Akbar Bugti, the insurgency escalated and the government response grew much harsher, resulting in large numbers of Balochs being detained for either nationalism or on suspicion of being a rebel. Many mutilated bodies were found bearing marks of torture. The BLA retaliated through the target killing of Punjabis in Balochistan, as well as Pashtuns and Sindhis. They also targeted energy infrastructure by blowing up gas pipelines. Local Balochs had been targeted by the separatist groups in the province. Brahamdagh Khan Bugti, alleged leader of Baloch Liberation Army (BLA), also asked separatists to conduct the ethnic cleansing of Non-Baloch citizens from the province and Brahamdagh Khan Bugti's sister was murdered in 2012. In 2006, the BLA was declared to be a terrorist organization by the Pakistani and British governments.

However, the insurgency led by the Baloch separatists in the province has been struggling. Baloch separatists have been losing their leaders and they have been unable to fill their ranks. There is also ongoing infighting between the different insurgent groups. The last insurgent leader, Balach Marri, was able to keep the different insurgent groups united. However, after his death in Afghanistan, infighting broke out between various insurgent groups. The insurgents were unable to replace him. Moreover, attacks on pro-government leaders and politicians who are willing to take part in election has also contributed to the decline in separatist appeal.

The News International reported in 2012 that a Gallup survey conducted for DFID revealed that the majority of Baloch do not support independence from Pakistan. Only 37 percent of Baloch were in favour of independence. Amongst Balochistan's Pashtun population support for independence was even lower at 12 percent. However, a majority (67 percent) of Balochistan's population did favour greater provincial autonomy. Majority of Baloch also do not support separatist groups. They support political parties who use legislature to address their grievances. Experts also claim that most of the nationalists in the province had come to believe that they could fight for their political right within Pakistan.

As of 2018, the Pakistani state was using Islamist militants to crush Balochi separatists. Academics and journalists in the United States have allegedly been approached by Inter-Services Intelligence spies, who threatened them not to speak about the insurgency in Balochistan, as well as human rights abuses by the Pakistani Army, or else their families would be harmed.

By 2020, Baluch separatists had been "greatly weakened" by Pakistan counterinsurgency operations, including incentives for the militants to lay down their weapons, and by fatigue and rifts among the separatists. In addition, the safe haven for the separatists in Afghanistan was eliminated by the victory of the Taliban in 2021. However, in 2021, the number of terrorist attacks by separatists in Baluchistan "nearly doubled" compared to the previous year.

On 16 January 2025, in a speech before the Pakistan National Assembly, Maulana Fazlur Rehman of Jamiat Ulema-e-Islam (F), expressed concern over the state's loss of authority in Balochistan. He stated that the government had "completely lost its writ" in these provinces. He additionally remarked that in some areas, "even Pakistan’s national anthem cannot be sung" and "the country’s flag cannot be hoisted in some schools today."

In May, during the 2025 India–Pakistan conflict, a social media post in which a writer named Mir Yar Baloch proclaimed himself leader of Balochistan and urged the United Nations and India to recognize the Republic of Balochistan as an independent state became a subject of media reporting.

== Sindhudesh ==
Sindhudesh (Sindhi: سنڌو ديش, literally "Sindhi Country") is an idea of a separate Homeland for Sindhis proposed by Sindhi nationalist parties for the creation of a Sindhi state, which would be independent from Pakistan. The movement is based in the Sindh region of Pakistan and was conceived by the Sindhi political leader G. M. Syed. A Sindhi literary movement emerged in 1967 under the leadership of Syed and Pir Ali Mohammed Rashdi, in opposition to the One Unit policy, the imposition of Urdu by the central government and to the presence of a large number of Muhajir (Indian Muslim refugees) settled in the province.

However, neither the separatist party nor the nationalist party have ever been able to take centre stage in Sindh. Local Sindhis strongly support Pakistan People Party (PPP). The unparalleled and unhindered success of the PPP in Sindh shows the preference of Sindhis for a constitutional political process over a separatist agenda to resolve their grievances. Similarly public opinion is also not heavily in favour of these parties either. In other words, neither the Sindhi separatists nor the nationalists have significant popular support — certainly not the kind that will make them capable of fuelling a full-scale insurgency. Almost all of the Sindhis have a strong Pakistani identity and prefer to remain part of Pakistan.

In 2012, a Sindhudesh rally was organised by a nationalist party in Karachi, which had a notably low turnout. The nationalist party had claimed that they would gather around million people for their million march. Although, only 3,000 to 4,000 people attended the rally.

In 2020, the Pakistani government banned multiple separatist outfits including the Jeay Sindh Qaumi Mahaz - Aresar group, Sindhudesh Liberation Army, and Sindhudesh Revolutionary Army

== Azad Kashmir and Gilgit-Baltistan ==
As of 2015, an independence movement exists in Gilgit-Baltistan (called "Balawaristan" by its supporters). Balawaristan National Front (Hameed Group) (BNF-H) led by Abdul Hamid Khan were trying to seek independence of Gilgit-Baltistan from Pakistan. However, Abdul Hamid Khan unconditionally surrendered to Pakistan security officials on 8 February 2019 after being banned for having connections to Indian intelligence agencies. Following his surrender, 14 more members of BNF-H were arrested for their anti-Pakistani activities. Since then, the fate of BNF-H is unknown. Another organisation, the Balawaristan National Front, led by Nawaz Khan Naji, seeks to declare Gilgit-Balistan an autonomous region under the administration of Pakistan until the promised plebiscite is carried out.

In Pakistan administered Kashmir, no political parties with that do not agree with accession with Pakistan can contest elections.

Sardar Arif Shahid was a Kashmiri nationalist leader who advocated the independence of Kashmir from both India and Pakistan's rule. He was killed on May 14, 2013, outside his house in Rawalpindi. It was the first time any pro-independence Kashmiri leader was targeted in this way in Pakistan. His supporters allege that he was killed by Pakistan security forces. Within the area, "Custodial torture and intimidation of independence supporters and other activists" has occurred.

In 2010, Chatham House, a London-based think tank, did a survey, sponsored by Saif al-Islam Gaddafi, in both Pakistani and Indian administered Kashmir. Based on a sample size of 3,774, it found that Kashmiris in Pakistan wanted independence. The survey states, 84% of Kashmiris in Pakistan administered Azad Kashmir wanted independence.

In October 2019, the People National Alliance organised a rally to free Kashmir from Pakistani rule. As a result of the police trying to stop the rally, 500 people were injured.
