= Latifabad =

Coordinates: 25.368°N 68.356°E

Latifabad لطيف آباد
- Town
- Country: Pakistan
- Province: Sindh
- City: Hyderabad

Government
  - Assistant Commissioner: Saud Khan Lund Baloch

Population (2017)
  - Total: 672,504

Latifabad (Sindhi: لطيف آباد, Urdu: لطِيف آباد) is a township in the southern suburbs of the city of Hyderabad, in Sindh, Pakistan.

== History ==
Latifabad's initial denizens were primary Sindhi, but after communal unrest in the 1980s between Sindhi-speaking and Urdu-speaking people, many Sindhis migrated to the nearby area of Qasimabad. This was due to the 1988 Latifabad riots, when a number of Muhajirs were massacred by Sindhi nationalist militants.

The majority of Urdu- and Sindhi-speaking people live in Latifabad. It was populated as an extension of the city of Hyderabad to settle large numbers of Muslim refugees (Muhajirs) from India following Partition, escaping from anti-Muslim violence, alongside development of the town of Qasimabad.

The locals that settled the town initially were ethnically mixed, but as the city experienced severe ethnic violence between Sindhis and Muhajirs in the 1980s, the city was increasingly segregated into two sub-parts, with Sindhi-speaking residents largely settling in Qasimabad and Urdu-speaking residents becoming concentrated Latifabad.

Serving an ethnic majority composed of Urdu- and Sindhi-speaking communities, Latifabad is further divided into units (numbered 1 to 12). This administrative classification remains in use, yet people generally prefer referring to areas by their unit numbers. Major political parties active in Latifabad include PTI, MQM, PSP, and PPP.

== Language ==
Latifabad has a large number of Urdu-speaking residents, comprising to about 55% of its population of 672,504. Approximately 40% are Sindhi-speaking, and around 5% belong to other ethnic groups.

== Settlement ==
Latifabad is divided into twelve units, rather than blocks, each numbered. Each unit has its own hospital and several schools, along with residential complexes and housing areas.

== Climate ==
Latifabad has a hot desert climate with warm conditions year-round. The period from mid-march to late June is the hottest period of the year, with highs peaking in May at 48 °C. During this time, winds often carry clouds of dust, and people mostly prefer staying indoors in the daytime, while at night the weather is more pleasant. For this reason, Latifabad is sometimes regarded as a "God-gifted" city. At night, people usually go outside for walks and to enjoy the cooler temperatures. Winters remain warm, with highs around 25 °C, though lows can often drop below 10 °C at night. On 7 June 1991 the highest recorded temperature was 48.5 °C, while the lowest temperature recorded was 1 °C (34 °F) on 8 February 2012.

== Administrative division ==
Latifabad is divided into 12 administrative divisions numbered from 1 to 12. Each number has a chairman which is elected through local body elections, who is responsible for addressing local issues of the related people of this unit.

== Economy ==
There are handicraft industries, including silver and gold work, ornamented silks, and embroidered leather saddles. Latifabad produces almost all of the ornamental glass or metal bangles.

== IT ==
Latifabad plays an important role in educating people in the field of IT not only in the town but also in the wider city. There are many centres like Aptech, Ureka, FAITH College, Chambers, Arena, and Horizon, and many others providing quality education to students. Two big mobile and computer markets are located in Latifabad: Chiragh Complex and Tayyab Complex, where a wide variety of new technology is available in a wide variety. A National Incubation Center (NIC) has been established for youngsters to start their own businesses.

== Food ==
People of Latifabad are fond of spicy foods, fast food, and sweet dishes as well. There is a food street in Latifabad No. 8 where every type of food is available, including fast food and especially biryani, which is the most common food available in the markets as well as on street corners. It is estimated that there are over 150 shops selling biryani of different varieties.

== Art council ==
Latifabad has an art council in Unit 7, where people of the city and performers from other cities appear. School annual functions, stage dramas, and motivational speeches by famous speakers are also held in this council.

== Sports ==
Afzaal ground in Latifabad No. 10 is a grass-covered and well-equipped ground which provides people of the area with a good place for recreation. There is a large badminton hall and a cricket ground where regional and local matches are played, and special events such as Ramzan night tournaments are also telecast live. Mehboob Ground in Latifabad No. 5 has a large area for play, and is a famous ground of Latifabad due to its maintenance.

== Healthcare and educational services ==
The largest mental asylum or hospital for the mentally ill in Pakistan (some people deem it the largest in Asia) named after Sir Cowasji Jehangir Readymoney (1812–1878), civil engineer and master constructor of Bombay, is the Jehangir Institute of Psychiatry, which is located in Latifabad unit 3, commonly known to the locals as Giddu Bandar.

Other hospitals in Latifabad include the St. Elizabeth's Hospital, Majee Hospital, City Care Hospital, Bhittai Hospital and Red Crescent (Hilal-e-Ahmar) Hospital, Al-Shifa Eyesight Hospital, and Life Care Hospital.

The Board of Intermediate and Secondary Education, Hyderabad, the body of the Government administering educational standards in the city, has its headquarters in unit 9 in Latifabad. Public School Hyderabad, founded in 1961, and one of the most famous schools in Sindh, is located in Latifabad Unit 3 and the area has many private and government schools and colleges.

== Other notable places ==
- The most famous pharmacy is Sheikh Medical and General Store, located just in front of the sabzi mandi (Naya Pull).
- Unit 7 (Pony Sath) is one of the most famous places, where a bridge connects the units and the city, and the house of late Sheikh Nizamuddin Siddiqui, owner of one of the biggest glass industries in Pakistan, Indus Glass Industry, is situated there.
- Unit 8 has a bazaar-shopping center called Siddiqui Centre that sells clothes, shoes, and bangles, products native to the city. Visitors and shoppers alike visit unit 8 before Eid to buy clothes and gifts. Units in Latifabad each have its own administrative unit, which works under the Hyderabad District Administration.
- Mohatta House is situated in Latifabad 6D in the vicinity of the district nazim's house. It is over 100 years old.
- Unit 6 is also home to the Hyderabad Board of Education, which as built a stadium to commemorate its presence. Most of the inter-school and inter-collegiate tournaments are played there. There is also one very big pharmacy, Zeeshan Medical Store, in Unit No. 5, Latifabad, in front of Shah Abdul Bhitai Hospital.
- Mostly playgrounds of the Hyderabad district are situated in Latifabad, such as Baagh-e-Mustafa Ground (Unit No. 8), Mehboob Ground (Unit No. 5), Afzaal Ground (Unit No. 10), and Degree Boys College Ground (Unit No. 11), Latifabad, in front of Naeem Hospital. Government Boys Degree College and Ghazali College are also located in Unite No. 11 along with several other playgrounds.
