= Abdul Wahid Aresar =

Scholar, writer, researcher and politician of Pakistan

Abdul Wahid Arisar
- عبدالواحد آريسر
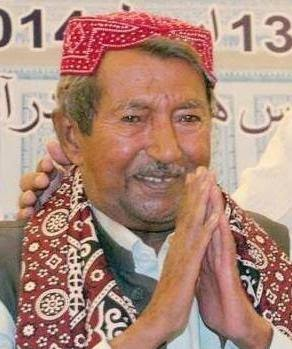
- Born: Abdul Wahid Arisar; 11 October 1949; Village Waoori, District: Umarkot
- Died: 3 May 2015 (aged 65); Karachi, Sindh
- Resting place: Buried at Village Unar Abad, District: Umarkot
- Other names: Arisar, Molvi Abdul Wahid Arisar
- Education: Primary School Sabho, Bhendo Shareef, Madarsa Hashmia Sujawal, Madarsa Muftah-ul-Uloom Hyderabad, Shah Waliullah Academy Hyderabad, Orintiel College Hyderabad
- Known for: Leadership of Jeay Sindh Qaumi Mahaz, philosophy of Peace
- Movement: Sindhudesh movement
- Spouse: Kaisar
- Children: 1

Abdul Wahid Arisar (Sindhi: عبد الواحد آريسر) (11 October 1949 – 3 May 2015) was a notable scholar, writer, researcher and Sindhi politician who was one of the heads of the Jeay Sindh Qaumi Mahaz (JSQM), a political party in Sindh. It was reported that there were significant "differences" between Arisar and the head of another faction in the JSQM, Bashir Qureshi. Arisar had previously been chairman of the party in the 1990s. Arisar was a student in a Madrasa near his village when his teacher gave him a book of G. M. Syed "Maujooda Siyasi soorat e Haal" Arisar was impressed by GM Syed's writing and started paying attention towards politics and mysticism (Sufism) rather than going to madrasa. Arisar's image in Sindhi youth is that of an intellectual and as one of the most respected personalities ever lived in Sindh. Arisar translated the novel of Frantz Fanon, "The Wretched of the Earth"in Sindhi, "Mitti hara marho" which became one of his popular works.

== Bibliography ==
The following is a list of books written by Abdul Wahid Arisar, including his prison diaries, reviews and his research work, as well as writings on his struggle for freedom.

S #	Roman Name	Books	Year of Publication
1	Pirih jo Pegham (Addresses)	Sindhi: پره جو پيغام	1974
2	Sadyun Joon Sadaoon (Addresses)	صدين جون صدائون	1976
3	Sarr Main Sanjhi Wer	سر ۾ سانجھي وير	1979
4	Warya Waheroo	وريا واهيرو	1981
5	Mitti’a Hana Manhoon (Translation of The Wretched of the Earth)	مٽيءَ هاڻا ماڻهو	1983
6	Tahki Nikta Tooh	ٽهڪي نڪتا ٽوهه	1985
7	Taram yatra (Jail Diary)	ترم ياترا (جيل ڊائري)	1985
8	Mariyun Maryus Keenaki (Jail Diary)	ماڙين ماريس ڪينڪي (جيل ڊائري)	1985
9	Sindhi Samaj jo Jaezo	سنڌي سماج جو جائزو	1985
10	G M Syed	جي ايم سيد (شخصيت ۽ فڪر)	1986
11	Thee na Muhabbat Maat	ٿي نه محبت مات	1986
12	Mujeeb ain Bhutto	مجيب ۽ ڀٽو	1987
13	Rabiul Awwal ja char chand	(Four crescents of Rabiul Awwal) ربيع الاول جا چار چنڊ	1966
14	Weragi Jy Wanjna Hua	ويراڳي جي وڃڻا ها	2015
15	Chaa te Shakhs Ho	ڇا ته شخص هو	1978
16	Gichi Ganha Looh Ja	ڳچيءَ ڳانا لوه جا	
17	Qoumi Tahreek Aii Qomi tahreek me Rukawatoon	قومي تحريڪ ۽ قومي تحريڪ ۾ روڪاوٽون	
18	Vrrk Vrrk Tareekh	ورق ورق تاريخ	
19	Baakh Jo Aawaz	باک جو آواز	
20	Chandokiyon aii Chet	چانڊوڪيون ۽ چيٽ	
21	Umeed Jo Qatul	اميد جو قتل	
22	Nae Door ja nawa Chaar darwesh	نئين دور جا نوان چار درويش	-|

== Death ==
Arisar was suffering from kidney disorder, he had been under treatment in a private hospital at Hyderabad, when his ailment became so severe that he was brought to Karachi and died in Karachi, Pakistan at the age of 65 on 3 May 2015.

== See also ==
- Sindhudesh
- G M Syed
- Muhammad Ibrahim Joyo
- Rasool Bux Palijo
- Jeay Sindh Qaumi Mahaz
- Sindh
- Sindhi
- Indus Valley
