= Secularism in Balochistan =

Secularism (Note: Balochi: سیکولرزم, pronounced [seː.kʊ.lər.ɪ.zəm]) has been present in Balochistan since before the 20th century and has shaped Baloch society, culture, and nationalism thought.

== Background ==
Before Islam, the Baloch people largely followed the Mazdakian and Manichaean sects of Zoroastrianism. Eventually, most Baloch converted to Sunni Islam, with a small Shia minority. Historically, sectarianism was very rare among the Baloch people. Many pre-Islamic practices continued in Baloch culture after the conversion to Islam.

Under the many historic Baloch dynasties, non-Muslims had much religious and economic freedom. Even after the Baloch people were incorporated into Pakistan, the Baloch society did not discriminate against non-Muslims.

Baloch people were known for secularism, and Balochistan was largely untouched by several waves of Islamism which swept the region.

== History ==
In Baloch society, the fusion of religion and politics had been a taboo, and the Baloch people had no elaborate structure of religious institutions and had a secular sociopolitical structure. The influence of religion in Balochistan grew after the mid-20th century, due to the Iranian revolution and the Insurgency in Balochistan.

Baloch nationalism promoted secularism. The first Baloch nationalists were inspired by Marxism–Leninism. Baloch nationalism was also known for its progressivism. Baloch nationalism and secularism were known for the inclusion of women and fighting against the social issues of women in Balochistan.

Islamic clerics often vilified the Baloch people due to their largely secular society. Many religious institutions used the term "bad Muslims" to describe the Baloch.

Many Christians escaping violence in other parts of Pakistan had settled in Balochistan. In 2012, a headmaster of a Catholic school stated that in Balochistan, "the atmosphere is brotherly. The Muslims are more liberal. All of Balochistan is better for the Christians than in the Punjab. People here are more liberal and not so concerned about religion."

In the 21st century, a Baloch family in Karachi had continued to protect the historic Bene Israel cemetery which they protected for centuries. The Baloch had also protected historic Hindu temples, such as the Hinglaj Mata shrine. After the demolition of the Babri Masjid in India, over 30 Hindu temples were attacked throughout Pakistan. However, there was no attack on any Hindu temple in Balochistan, nor on any Hindu by a Baloch.

In Baloch society, the role of Islamic clerics was limited to preserving the mosque and performing essential rites, such as marriage or funerals. The majority of Islamic clerics in Balochistan were not Baloch, as such jobs were considered against Baloch tradition. Pirs and Sayyids also had no influence in Baloch sociopolitical affairs.

During the Partition of India, Baloch secularists opposed Pakistan from the beginning, and hoped for a Baloch state, claiming that the Baloch people being mostly Muslim did not justify the inclusion of Balochistan into Pakistan.

Following the 1970s operation in Balochistan, Pakistani intelligence agencies began their policy of Islamization of Balochistan. Pakistani authorities were mainly concerned with secular Baloch nationalists, and they had tolerated the activities of Islamist groups, which they used to weaken the Baloch nationalist influence. Pakistani authorities funded Islamists, who later overpowered Baloch nationalists in both militancy and politics. Pakistan also funded religious schools and Islamic institutions in Balochistan to increase Islamism and weaken Baloch nationalism and secularism. Pakistan had also settled foreign Islamists in Balochistan. The Pakistani army specifically focused on attacking the secular Baloch nationalists instead of Islamists. In 2002, the Pakistani army rigged the elections in Balochistan in favor of the Jamiat Ulema-e-Islam. The effects of Islamization in Balochistan were brought to attention in 2017. The secular Baloch nationalists claimed that while they opposed the Islamists, their focus on fighting Pakistan prevented them from simultaneously fighting the Islamists.

A BLF commander in 2016 claimed that "nationalism in Balochistan has a superior place over religion. The way to counter radical Islam is to stop pretending that it is not radical. An independent Balochistan will have clear policies that never tolerate any type of religious extremism in our country. It will never make statements that suggest radicalism has a legitimate basis because of people's anger at the West or drone strikes or anything. And we will make all our actions show these policies. But the Pakistani government is using its national assets and jihadi organizations to distract this and have others see the Baloch fight for freedom movement as a sectariam issue. And they do this by harboring organizations such as ISIS and Al Qaeda to counter the Baloch freedom movement and make attacks on minorities in Balochistan to defame the Baloch freedom struggle. This has clearly failed among the Baloch people who recognize what Pakistan is doing."

The Iranian revolution had a role in the Islamization of Balochistan due to religious differences. The influence of Molavis grew, as they gradually replaced the traditional Baloch tribal leadership in society. Before the Iranian revolution, there was no tensions between Sunnis and Shias in Baloch society, and the mosques in Balochistan largely served as interdenominational. Groups like Jundullah emerged, although Abdolmalek Rigi portrayed himself from an Iranian Sunni perspective rather than a Baloch perspective, and claimed that he solely fought for increased Sunni rights in Iran and nothing else.

== See also ==
- Secularism in Iran
- Secularism in Pakistan
