= Sindh Democratic Alliance =

Former political party in Pakistan

The Sindh Democratic Alliance was a regional political party in Pakistan. The party was created by the bureaucrat-turned-politician Imtiaz Shaikh in mid-2001. He was formerly a right-hand man of Jam Sadiq Ali, who was the Chief Minister of Sindh from 1990 until he was murdered in 1992. At the behest of the military government, he resigned from the government post and formed SDA. Arbab Ghulam Rahim, the former chief minister Sindh and former Speaker Sindh Assembly Syed Jalal Mehmood Shah were also one of the leaders of SDA.

At the legislative elections, held on 20 October 2002, the party was part of the National Alliance, that won 4.6% of the popular vote and 16 out of 342 seats in the National Assembly.

In May 2004, Sindh Democratic Alliance merged with PML (Q) along with other parties to form united Pakistan Muslim League.
