= Hussainabad (Sindh) =

- Location within Pakistan
- Coordinates: 25.378°N 68.323°E
- Country: Pakistan
- Province: Sindh
- District: Hyderabad
- Time zone: UTC+5 (PST)

Hussainabad (Urdu: حسین آباد) is one of the nine town municipal corporations of the Hyderabad district in Sindh, Pakistan. It lies by the Indus River. The neighbourhood is also known as Gidu Bandar.

== Toponymy ==
Bandar is a Persian word meaning a port, in this case on the Indus. Gidu refers to an 18th-century statesman, Diwan Gidumal, who founded the settlement.

== Notables ==
Captain Abdul Shakoor Shaheed participated in the Indo-Pakistani War of 1965 and earned medals including "Nishan E Jurat."

== Geography ==
Mehran Park is near the Indus River (Sindhu Darya).

== Shopping ==
Zeeshan Plaza River is about 0.6 kilometer from the Indus. It is the town's largest Plaza. Ali twin towers will be larger, comprising 8 storeys.

In Wapda Colony a hospital is located near a park, jogging area and national bank.

== Recreation ==
Fishing is popular for species including Palla fish (Ilish).

== Not to be confused ==
There is a village of the same name, also in Sindh, in the Sujawal district.
