= Sindhudesh Liberation Army =

Sindhi nationalist and separatist militant group active in Sindh, Pakistan

- سنڌوديش لبريشن آرمي
- Flag of Sindhudesh used by SLA
- Other name: SLA; SDLA
- Leader: Shafi Muhammad Burfat
- Military leader: Darya Khan (Commander-in-Chief)
- Dates active: 2007–Present
- Country: Pakistan: Sindh
- Allegiance: India
- Active regions: Sindh
- Ideology: Sindhi nationalism Separatism
- Status: Active
- Wars: Insurgency in Sindh

The Sindhudesh Liberation Army (Sindhi: سنڌوديش آزادي فوج, romanized: Sindhudesh Azadi Foj, abbreviated SLA) is a Sindhi nationalist militant organization based in the Sindh province of Pakistan. Its aim is to separate Sindh from Pakistan and integrate it into India. It became publicly known in 2010 after it claimed responsibility for a targeted bomb blast on railway tracks near Hyderabad, Pakistan. The group is currently active in some parts of the city of Karachi and mostly active the rural areas of Sindh province.

Darya Khan is the leader of the group.

Jeay Sindh Muttahida Mahaz's Chairman, Shafi Muhammad Burfat was reported to be operating the Sindhudesh Liberation Army from Kabul, in 2012.

== Origin ==
The Sindhudesh Liberation Army has been involved in terrorist activities since as far back as at least 2007 in Sindh and Karachi. It was allegedly created with the support of India's Research and Analysis Wing, with the goal of first creating instability in Sindh. At first, attacks were confined to damaging ATM machines, power transmission lines and railway tracks, but gradually began to include attacking security forces, mainly the Sindh Police and Sindh Rangers deployed in Sindh. After a surge in attacks, Pakistan's Interior Ministry included the group, along with the Jeay Sindh Qaumi Mahaz, on its list of banned organizations under the Anti-Terrorism Act.

== Attacks and designation as a terrorist organization ==
The Sindhudesh Liberation Army is responsible for low-intensity bomb explosions in parts of Sindh. The group has been involved in terrorist activities since 2007 in Sindh and Karachi. At first, attacks were confined to damaging ATM machines, power transmission lines and railway tracks, but gradually began to include attacking security forces, mainly the Sindh Police and Sindh Rangers deployed in Sindh. In May 2012, the group claimed responsibility for low-intensity bomb explosions outside the bank branches and Automated Teller Machines (ATM) of the National Bank of Pakistan (NBP) in different districts of Sindh. Four people were injured in the attacks. In 2016, a vehicle of Chinese engineer was targeted with remote control bomb at Gulshan-e-Hadeed Karachi. The Chinese national and his driver were injured in the explosion. Sindhudesh Liberation Army (SLA) claimed responsibility for the attack.

After a surge in attacks, Pakistan's Interior Ministry included the group, along with the Jeay Sindh Qaumi Mahaz, on its list of banned organizations under the Anti-Terrorism Act.

Pakistan has repeatedly accused India of creating and supporting the Sindhudesh Liberation Army.

On August 5, 2020, the Sindhudesh Revolutionary Army (SRA), a group allied with SLA, claimed responsibility for a grenade attack on a rally organized by the Jamaat-i-Islami in Karachi that injured about 40 people. The rally was taken out on the first anniversary of the Indian government's decision to revoke the special status of Jammu and Kashmir.

== See also ==
- Balochistan Liberation Army
- Sindhudesh
- Sindhi Nationalism
- List of Sindhudesh Liberation Army attacks on Pakistan infrastructure in Sindh
- Insurgency in Sindh
- Separatist movements of Pakistan
