= Sindhudesh Revolutionary Army =

Sindhi nationalist and separatist militant group active in Pakistan

Sindhdesh Revolutionary Army
- سنڌوديش جي انقلابي فوج
- Spokesperson: Sodho Sindhi
- Country: Pakistan
- Group: Asghar Shah group
- Annual revenue: From BLA and BLF
- Part of: Baloch Raaji Aajoi Sangar
- Wars: Insurgency in Sindh; Insurgency in Balochistan

The Sindhudesh Revolutionary Army (Sindhi: سنڌوديش جي انقلابي فوج, romanized: Sindhudesh je Inqlabi Foj) abbreviated as SRA, is a Sindhi nationalist-separatist militant organization based in the Sindh province of Pakistan. It is supported, armed and financed by Baloch nationalist groups (such as the Baloch Raaji Aajoi Sangar, Balochistan Liberation Army, and Balochistan Liberation Front) as an organization for proxy warfare and instability in the Sindh province of Pakistan. It commonly targets and attacks infrastructure projects and economic infrastructure in Sindh, especially infrastructure linked to Chinese companies or individuals.

== Origin and ban ==
The Sindhudesh Revolutionary Army has been involved in criminal activities since as far back as at least 2007 in Sindh capital Karachi. At first, attacks were confined to damaging ATM machines, power transmission lines and railway tracks, but gradually began to include attacking security forces, mainly the Sindh Police and Sindh Rangers deployed in Sindh. After a surge in attacks, Pakistan's Interior Ministry included the group, along with the Jeay Sindh Qaumi Mahaz, on its list of banned organizations under the Anti-Terrorism Act.

== Relationship with Baloch separatist groups ==
In 2020, Baloch separatist group including the BLA, BLF, and BRA, held a joint meeting with the SRA to form the Baloch Raji Ajoi Sangar (BRAS) with the aim to target Chinese interests in Pakistan. At that time, BRAS stated that “Sindh and Balochistan are equally affected by the expansionist and oppressive China". "Through the China-Pakistan Economic Corridor (CPEC), China aims to subjugate Balochistan and Sindh in order to occupy their coasts and resources from Badin to Gwadar” they said. This agreement showed the cooperation between Balochi and Sindhi separatists regarding China's role in both provinces and their desire to resist China by targeting its assets, interests, and its nationals.

Baloch insurgent groups have reportedly provided training and weapons to the Sindhudesh Revolutionary Army in order to enhance the latter's operational capacities. In return, Sindhi separatists provide logistical support to Balochi separatists for their operations in Karachi and other areas of Sindh. The Sindhi militants’ support has allowed the Balochi separatists to expand their operational area to Karachi, where they carried out several attacks on Chinese assets. For instance, in 2018, Baloch separatists mounted an attack on the Chinese consulate in Karachi itself. Two years later in 2020, the Baloch separatists also attempted to storm the Pakistan Stock Exchange compound in Karachi, but all four attackers were killed by security forces stationed there. The attack on the stock exchange was reportedly directly facilitated by the Sindhudesh Revolutionary Army.

== Activities ==
In 2020, Sindhi separatists (including the Sindhudesh Revolutionary Army) claimed 10 attacks across Pakistan's Sindh province, including attacks in the port city and provincial capital of Karachi.

In February 2025 the Sindh Police's Deputy Inspector General of South Karachi, Syed Asad Raza, said that some unidentified individuals hurled a grenade at the police station, which injured three police officers, namely Riaz Ahmed (aged 36), Amir Zafar Iqbal (aged 34), and Mohammed Arshad (aged 52). He also said that, apart from the BLF, the police had also suspected the involvement of elements from the Sindhudesh Revolutionary Army in the grenade attack.
