= Nisar Ahmed Panhwar =

Pakistani politician (born 1966)

Member of the Provincial Assembly of Sindh
- In office 2008–2013
- Constituency: PS- 127 (Karachi-XXXIX)

Member of the National Assembly of Pakistan
- In office 2004–2007
- Preceded by: Haji Aziz Ullah
- Succeeded by: Sufiyan Yousuf
- Constituency: NA-246 (Karachi-VIII)

Personal details
- Born: 8 March 1966 (age 60) Shikarpur, Sindh Pakistan
- Party: MQM-L (2004-present)

Nisar Ahmed Panhwar is a Pakistani politician who has been member of the Provincial Assembly of Sindh from 2008 to 2013. He also served as a member of the National Assembly of Pakistan from 2004 to 2007.

== Political career ==
He was elected to the National Assembly of Pakistan as a candidate of Muttahida Qaumi Movement from Constituency NA-246 (Karachi-VIII) in the 2004 by-elections.

He was re-elected to the Provincial Assembly of Sindh as a candidate of Muttahida Qaumi Movement from Constituency PS-127 (Karachi-XXXIX) in the 2008 Pakistani general election.
