= Jeay Sindh Muttahida Mahaz =

- Abbreviation: JSMM
- Chairman: Shafi Muhammad Burfat
- Founder: Shafi Muhammad Burfat
- Founded: 26 November 2000 (25 years ago)
- Banned: 15 March 2013
- Split from: JSQM
- Headquarters: Sann, Sindh
- Newspaper: Azadi translation: Freedom
- Student wing: Jeay Sindh Students' Federation(JSMM)
- Ideology: Sindhi nationalism Separatism
- Colors: Red
- Slogan: Sindhudesh Is Destiny, G.M Syed Is The Guide

Party flag

Website
- www.jsmmsindh.com

The Jeay Sindh Muttahida Mahaz (Sindhi: جيئي سنڌ متحده محاذ, pronounced [dʒiːeː sɪŋd̪ʱ mʊt̪eːɦɪd̪a məɦaːz]; translation: Jeay Sindh United Front; abbr. JSMM lit. 'Long Live Sindh United Front') is one of several major separatist political parties in Sindh, Pakistan, that advocate for the separation of Sindhudesh from Pakistan. Founded in the year 2000, by the veteran Sindhi nationalists belonging to the Sindhudesh movement who left JSQM. The founder and the current Chairman of party Shafi Muhammad Burfat is living in exile in Germany under political asylum.

Pakistani Law Enforcement Agencies have been accusing JSMM for violence in the province and it had been also reported that prior to his asylum in Germany, the Party Chairman Shafi Muhammad Burfat had been living in Kabul, Afghanistan. On March 15, 2013, through an official decree, Pakistan's Home Ministry proscribed JSMM as a terrorist organization and banned its freedom of association and speech.

A significant rise in the Human Rights violations in Sindh have frequently been witnessed in previous years and Human rights campaigners are thoroughly concerned about the enforced disappearances and extra-judicial killings of JSMM leaders and activists. Former Secretary General of JSMM Muzafar Bhutto was abducted and killed by Pakistani Agencies. Senior vice chairman of JSMM Sirai Qurban Khohaver and three others were set ablaze near Sanghar, Sindh.

== History ==
Map of Sindh (in Pakistan)

=== Formation (2000) ===
Shafi Burfat and other party leaders left JSQM in 2000, and formed new outfit of Sindhudesh freedom movement namely JSMM on November 26, 2000 at Sann. This was announced in the "Jeay Sindh Workers Conference" convened by the nationalist leaders Shafi Muhammad Burfat, Samiallah Kalhoro, Muzafar Bhutto. Speakers in that conference alleged that JSQM was not serious regarding the national independence of Sindhudesh.

=== Emergence as a massive party (2009) ===
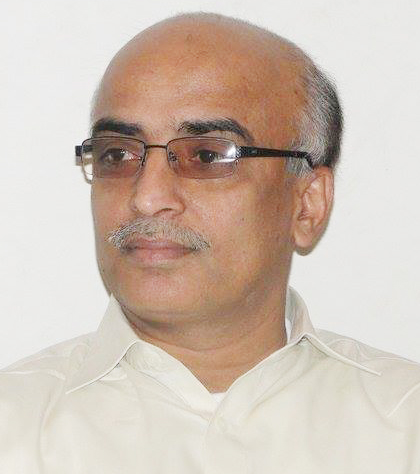
Shafi Muhammad Burfat, chairman of the JSMM. Burfat is living in Germany under political Asylum.

In the year 2009, Gmist Council (governing institution) of another Sindhi nationalist outfit JSQM (A), decided to merge it with JSMM. But later Chairman of Jeay Sindh Qaumi Mahaz (A), Abdul Wahid Aresar denied joining the JSMM but most of the party leaders led by Sirai Qurban Khahawar left Aresar and joined JSMM. And thus JSMM soon emerged as the 2nd largest separatist Sindhi organization associated with Sindhudesh Freedom Movement.

== Organizational Details ==
=== Structure ===
The highest authority in the party is the Chairman. Officially, Jeay Sindh Muttahida Mahaz constitution provides a four-year term for the Chairman. Chairman is elected by National Congress (Higher Authority) of organization. Elected Chairman is authorized to elect the Central Organizational Body from the members of Central Committee.

=== Policies ===
JSMM regards Sindhi Nationalist, G.M. Syed as an intellect, ideologue and architect of the cause of complete independence of Sindh from Pakistan. It totally rejects the parliamentary way of struggle for getting freedom and strongly advocates all the forms of anti-state movement for the independence of Sindh from Pakistan. It has repeatedly shown its support for the West’s the war on terror. It has been staging Sindh-wide protests and marches to condemn the Punjabi hegemony over federation and its exploitation of natural and mineral resources of Sindh. It also condemns racism and religious intolerance. JSMM holds Punjab responsible for the water crisis in Sindh & has been rejecting the 1991 water accord. It has also been protesting the CPEC, Mega city projects and influx of outsiders in Sindh, demanding cancellation of citizenship and registration for the alien settlers from the other provinces.

== Allegations ==
=== Connection with Sindhudesh Liberation Army ===
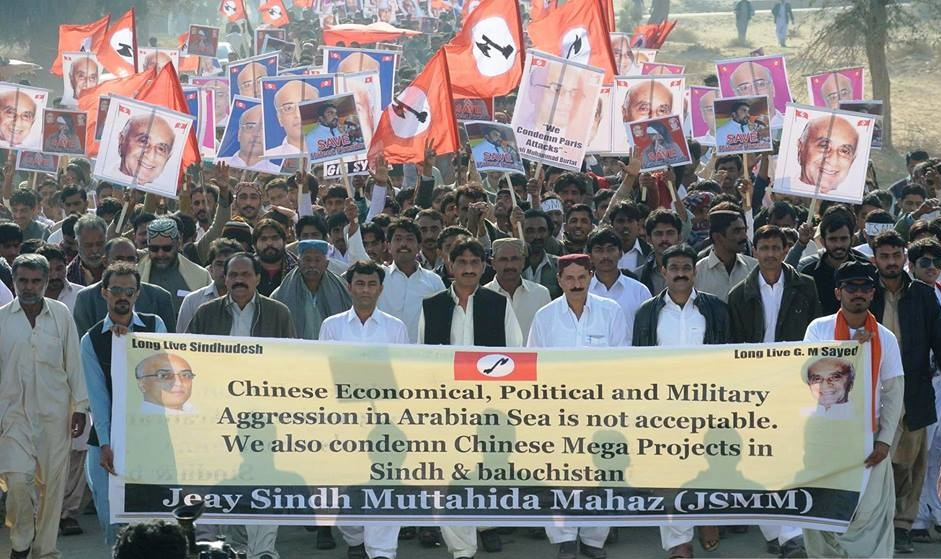
Organization opposing Chinese mega projects in Sindh.

The Sindhudesh Liberation Army is a militant organization based in the Sindh province of Pakistan, strives to establish an independent state of SindhuDesh. The group is currently headed by Chief Commander Darya Khan. Pakistan's media also criticized that JSMM's Chairman Shafi Muhammad Burfat is operating Sindhudesh Liberation Army from Kabul.

=== Connection with Indian Research and Analysis Wing ===
Two suspected people killed on 5 July 2014, were considered by police to be activists of JSMM. They died when the bomb they were carrying blew after a traffic accident in Karachi. According to police, Abdul Fatah Dahiri and Usman Panhwar were members of JSMM which may have ties with India's premier intelligence agency RAW. The Indian intelligence agency might have been trying to target UN designated terrorist Hafiz Muhammad Saeed, who was having a public rally nearby, using its local agents. Two nationalist activists were rounded up by police, suspecting them of sabotaging CPEC project. Police officials claimed that they had launched attacks to sabotage the China-Pakistan Economic Corridor with funding from the Indian spy agency Research and Analysis Wing.

== Human Rights Abuses ==
Activists of JSMM has been at the receiving end of Human rights violations, perpetrated by the Pakistan Security and intelligence agencies. Condition has reached an alarming proportion. In Sindh, 100s of JSMM members and activists have been disappeared and killed extrajudicially with their tortured, bullet riddled bodies being dumped on the streets. Some infamous cases include that JSMM's former leader, Mr. Muzzafar Bhutto who was abducted two times and was kept in military torture cells, where he succumbed to his injuries during his second detention. On April 21, 2011 unidentified armed men at Bakhorri Mori area in district Sanghar shot at the car carrying JSMM members Senior Vice-Chairman Sirai Qurban Khuhawar, Noorullah Tunio, Roploo Cholyani, and Nadir Bugti causing the gas tank to ignite. Munir Khan Cholyani, the Media Coordinator at JSMM, was abducted and extra-judicially killed by Pakistani LeAs.

== See also ==
- Sindhudesh
- Shafi Muhammad Burfat
- Sindhi nationalism
- G M Sayed
- Sindhudesh Liberation Army
- Jeay Sindh Qaumi Mahaz
- Separatist movements of Pakistan
