= Sann, Sindh =

Pakistani town

Sann (Sindhi: سن)
- Union council
- Location in Sindh Sann (Pakistan)
- Coordinates: 26.040299°N 68.137632°E
- Country: Pakistan
- Region: Sindh
- District: Jamshoro
- Taluka: Manjhand
- Time zone: UTC+5 (PST)
  - Summer (DST): UTC+6 (PDT)

Sann is a small town and union council located in Manjhand taluka of Jamshoro District, Sindh Province, Pakistan. It lies on the western bank of the Indus river, at the mouth of an intermittent stream that brings down water from the Lakhi hills when it rains. The town is located midway between Manjhand and Amri on the main Sehwan-Kotri trunk road.

Ranikot, the world's largest fort, is about 30 km southwest of Sann.

The Sindhi nationalist leader G. M. Syed was born in Sann, and his birthday is celebrated here annually.

== History ==
Under the Mughal Empire, Sann formed a pargana in the sarkar of Sehwan. Sann was noted for its indigo production; according to the Mazhar-i-Shahjahani, local landowners installed Persian wheels to help irrigate the indigo crop. Records of English factors indicate that indigo from Sann was sold in Thatta and then exported to Europe.

In the early 1600s, the Mughal governor of Sehwan, Shamshir Khan Uzbek, had a fort built in Sann, and established a thana here under the command of his relative Khwaja Jan. Later, during the tenure of the governor Ahmad Beg Khan (who held office from April 1628 until at least late 1629), Sann was attacked and looted by Samejas and Nuhmardis. After this, Ahmad Beg Khan had a wall constructed around the town; Yusuf Mirak wrote in the Mazhar-i-Shahjahani (1634) that the wall was still standing at that time. Under the governor Dindar Khan (Ahmad Beg Khan's immediate successor, who was transferred away in late 1633) Sann and its fort were again attacked by the pargana's arbabs, Sayyid Yusuf and Sayyid Jung, who had allied with the Samejas and Nuhmardis against the governor.

Around 1874, Sann's population was estimated at about 1,000 people, split about 50-50 between Muslims (mostly Memons and Mohanas) and Hindus (mostly Lohanos). It was the seat of a tappedar and had a dharamshala and a small police post. It was not a significant commercial or industrial centre in its own right, although trading caravans passed through the town on their way south from Afghanistan.

== Notable personalities of Sann ==
G.M. Syed is a famous personality of Sann, Sindh. His grandson Syed Jalal Mehmood Shah also belongs to this town. Population 8,500

== See also ==
- Sindh United Party
- Jeay Sindh
