= Syed Jalal Mehmood Shah =

Pakistani politician

- سيد جلال محمود شاهه

Founder and Leader of SUP
- Incumbent
- Assumed office 2006

Personal details
- Born: 25 February 1964 (age 62) Dadu, Sindh, Pakistan
- Party: SUP (2006–present)
- Other political affiliations: PML(Q) (2004-2006); SDA (2001–2004); IND (1997–1999)
- Education: Cadet College Petaro
- Alma mater: Bachelor of Arts (B.A.)
- Occupation: Politician, Activist
- Known for: Activism for the rights of Sindh

Syed Jalal Mehmood Shah (Sindhi: سيد جلال محمود شاهه) is a Pakistani Sindhi nationalist politician and activist who strives for the democratic rights to the people of Sindh. He is a grandson of Sindh's national arch-leader, statesman and philosopher Sain (سائين) G. M. Syed (Ghulam Murtaza Shah Syed) and the son of politician Imdad Mohammad Shah. He remained in companionship of his grandfather Sain G. M. Syed since his childhood. Like his grandfather and father, Shah was at the forefront of social activities and well-being and, following in the footsteps of his father, joined politics.

== Education ==
Jalal Mehmood Shah passed five classes of primary education and 6th class of secondary education at Sann, he got further education from 7th class to Intermediate at the Cadet College Petaro. He got a Bachelor of Arts (B.A.) from Government College Nawabshah in 1986.

== Political career ==
=== Political head-start ===
Shah participated as a student in 1983's Movement for the Restoration of Democracy protests. He established the 'Young Progressive Thinker's Forum' with his like-minded comrades and became its leader. The Young progressive Thinker's Forum renamed 'Sindh Thinker's Forum' in 1996 and Shah became its first president. Syed Munir Shah Zakiri, Asif Baladi and other youngsters were his companions in the Sindh Thinker's Forum. several literary programmes were arranged as well as Sattar Rind and other youth books were published through the Forum. Shah participated in the general elections of 1997 and was elected Sindh's Assembly member as an independent and was elected as deputy speaker of Sindh's Assembly on 22 February 1997. He was speaker of Sindh's Assembly from 30 October 1998 to 12 October 1999. In 1998, when the Federal Government of Pakistan suspended the powers of Sindh's Assembly speaker and Sindh's assembly members meeting was called on a notification, he challenged this matter in the Supreme Court of Pakistan, which affirmed his powers.

Shah formed the Sindh Democratic Alliance (S.D.A) in which he let in those politicians who were not part of Pakistan Peoples Party; he did politics from SDA platform as well. On 9 December 2006, he called a grand convention at Jamshoro where he formed Sindh United Party (SUP) and he was made president of it; He has been still serving as a president of SUP. His party manifesto is based on objectives of Social justice in addition with prosper and autonomous Sindh.Shah has been chairman of 'Shah Saddr Educational Society', patron of 'G.M Syed Foundation' and member of Imdaad Foundation. He has published various books of his grandfather, G. M. Syed. He moved the G. M. Syed library to his residence at the 'G.M Syed Edifice' in Jamshoro; where researchers are offered food and residence. Shah arranged conferences on Sindh's issues of water and national production natural resources.

Jalal Shah asked Urdu-speaking Sindhis that they should unite for the betterment of Sindh motherland, he was addressing a peace conference on the occasion of 20th death anniversary of Sain G. M. Syed at Karachi Press Club. In 2012 SUP chairman and Pml(N) Nawaz Sharif signed a memorandum and joint declaration of 7-points to form an alliance in the general elections of 2013. He also took a severe stand on the issue of IDP shifting from North Waziristan towards Sindh after the Army operation 'Operation Zarb-e-Azb' being conducted against the terrorists there.

== See also ==
- Sindh United Party
