= Sindh Taraqi Pasand Party =

Sindh Taraqi Pasand Party سندھ ترقی پسند پارٹی
- Sindhi name: سنڌ ترقي پسند پارٽي
- Abbreviation: STP
- Chairman: Qadir Magsi
- Founder: Qadir Magsi
- Founded: 1991; 35 years ago
- Ideology: Sindhi nationalism
- Political position: Left-wing
- National affiliation: TTAP; PONM

Election symbol
- Television (2013 General Elections)

Party flag

Website
- www.stpparty.org

Sindh Taraqi Pasand Party (Sindhi: سنڌ ترقي پسند پارٽي, Urdu: سندھ ترقی پسند پارٹی) is a left-wing Pakistani political party. Qadir Magsi is the chairman of Sindh Taraqi Pasand Party.

The Sindh Taraqi Pasand Party (STP) has been engaged in socio- political activism in Pakistan for the last two decades, by struggling against despotism, theocratic and fascist terrorism, and economic exploitation of smaller constituent units with a special focus on Sindh and Sindhi people. It is now poised to play a pivotal role in parliamentary politics of Pakistan, by contesting elections and undertaking formal activities in political and developmental spheres as an organized institution.

== Ethnic violence against Muhajirs ==
The party was involved in ethnic violence against Muhajirs in the late 1980s when they fought against the Muttahida Qaumi Movement (MQM) led by Altaf Hussain. STP killed thousands of Muhajirs in the 1988 Latifabad riots.

== Electoral history ==
| Election | Votes | Seats | +/– | Source |
|---|---|---|---|---|
| 2013 | 23,397 | 0 / 342 | Steady | ECP |
