= Jeay Sindh Students' Federation =

Student wing

Jeay Sindh Students’ Federation (JSMM) جيئي سنڌ اسٽوڊنٽ فيڊريشن
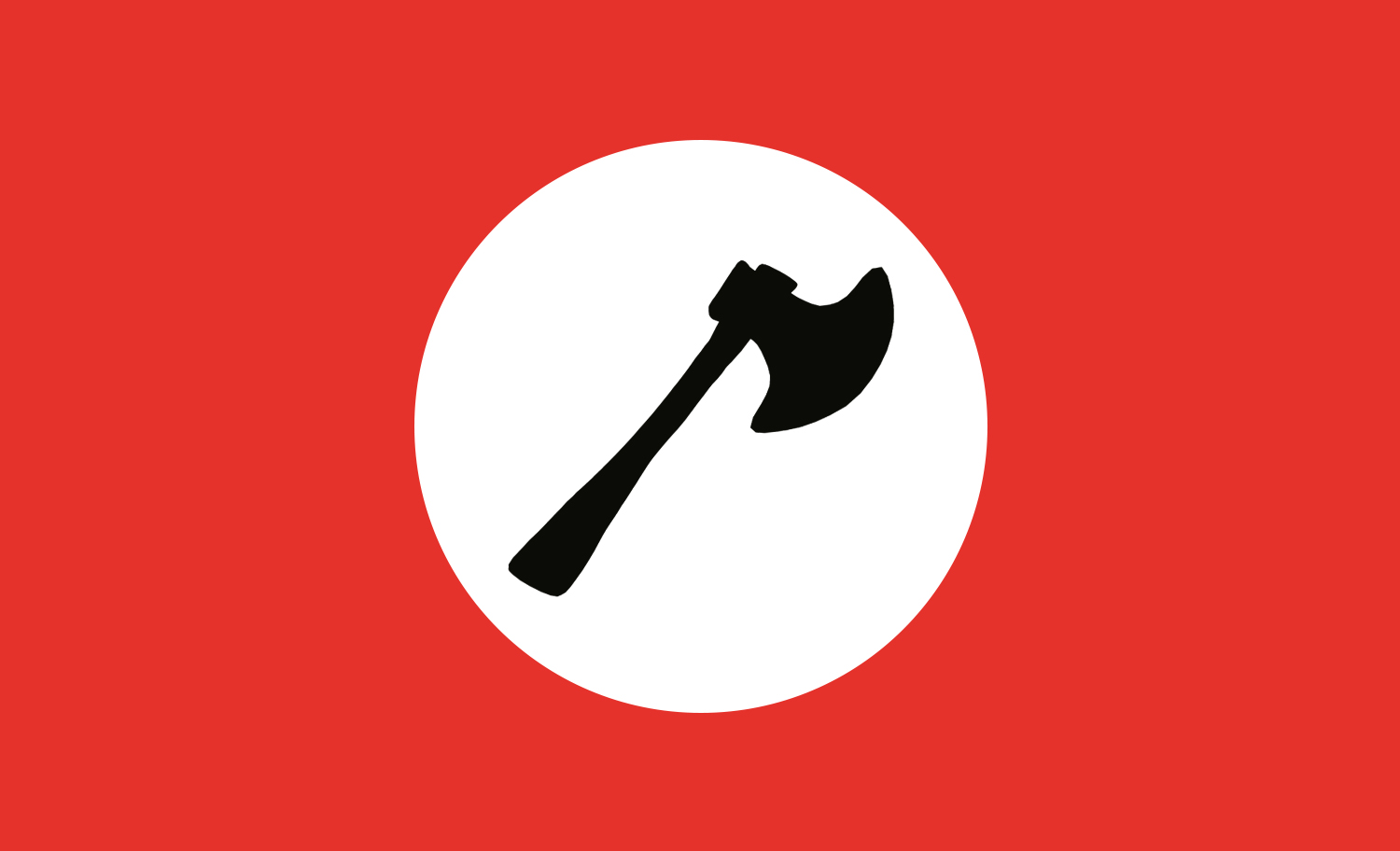
- Flag of the Jeay Sindh Students' Federation
- Abbreviation: JSSF
- Formation: 1969
- Type: Students' organisation
- Purpose: Freedom for Sindhudesh
- Headquarters: Sann
- Location: Sindh

The Jeay Sindh Students’ Federation (JSMM) Sindhi: (جيئي سنڌ اسٽوڊنٽس فيڊريشن) abbreviated as JSSF JSMM, is the student wing of various Sindhudesh movement organizations. It follows the ideology of G. M. Syed, founded in 1969. JSSF was a nationalist outfit which emerged from controversy around the One Unit Scheme in the late 1960s and later joined Syed in his ideology of a separate homeland for Sindhis in 1972. Since then, it has been working as the students’ front of the Sindhudesh movement.

== History ==
JSSF (JSMM) is the student wing of various Sindhudesh movement organizations following the ideology of G. M. Syed, founded in 1969.

JSSF (JSMM) describes itself as a supporter of the rights of Sindhi students and of Sindhudesh.

A banner showing membership campaign of JSSF

The student Sindhudesh movement emerged in 1967 in response to the One Unit Scheme, which was protested by thousands of Sindhi student activists. On 4 March 1967, a procession of students marched from the University of Sindh, Jamshoro campus, to Hyderabad. While the procession was on its way to the Hyderabad from Jamshoro, the police used force against the protesters, injuring 17 of them and arresting 200. This prompted the students to found the JSSF, which recognize 4 March 1967 as the "day of the student struggle of Sindh".

Five JSSF members were shot and killed by the security forces at Thori Phatak, near Manjhand, district Jamshoro, on 17 October 1984, when they were on their way to Larkana.

JSSF leader Asif Panhwar was found dead by gunshots in Larkana on 26 November 2014. It was alleged that he had been taken by police and plain-clothed men from Hyderabad on 15 August 2014. Another JSSF leader, Shakeel Khunharo was taken on 6 October 2014 and later found dead along a roadside near Karachi. Hafeez Pirzado, the current chairman of the JSSF was sentenced a term of 37 years in prison on 12 August 2016 by Anti-Terrorism Court Larkana on the charges of treachery against the state of Pakistan. He is imprisoned in the Central Jail, Hyderabad.

== Factions ==
- Jeay Sindh Students' Federation of Jeay Sindh Qaumi Mahaz Arisar and Jeay Sindh Qaumi Mahaz Bashir Khan commonly known as JSSF (JSQM-A) and JSSF (JSQM-B)
- Jeay Sindh Students' Federation of Jeay Sindh Muttahida Mahaz commonly known as JSSF (JSMM)
- Jeay Sindh Students' Federation of Jeay Sindh Mahaz commonly known as JSSF (JSM)
