= Sindh United Party =

Sindh United Party سندھ یونائیٹڈ پارٹی
- Sindhi name: سنڌ يونائيٽڊ پارٽي
- Abbreviation: SUP
- President: Syed Zain-ul-Abdin Shah
- Chairman: Syed Jalal Mehmood Shah
- General Secretary: Munir Naich
- Founder: Syed Jalal Mehmood Shah
- Founded: December 9, 2006; 19 years ago
- Headquarters: Jamshoro, Sindh
- Ideology: Sindhi nationalism Regionalism
- Political position: Left-wing
- Religion: Secular
- National affiliation: TTAP
- Regional affiliation: GDA
- Colors: White and Red

Election symbol
- Car

Party flag

The Sindh United Party (SUP; Sindhi: سندھ یونائیٹڈ پارٹی) is a Sindhi nationalist regional political party that aims to give the democratic rights to the people of Sindh over their homeland and believes in more provincial rights. The party was founded by former deputy speaker of the Sindh Assembly, Syed Jalal Mehmood Shah, in 2006.

== History ==
The SUP was formed on 9 December 2006 at a political workers' convention at G.M Syed Edifice, Jamshoro, in Sindh. Syed Jalal Mehmood Shah, a former deputy speaker of the Sindh Assembly, laid the foundation of the party. Syed Zain Shah is the current president, where as Roshan Boriro as Senior Vice President and Syed Munir Hyder Shah as Vice President of the Sindh United Party.

On 3 November 2007, the dictator, Pervez Musharraf, imposed an emergency and suspended the country's 1973 constitution. To restore democracy, the SUP peacefully launched a series of protests across the country. The party strongly believes in the power of nonviolence.

In 2015, the SUP decided to launch a mass mobilisation and awareness campaign after Eid al-Fitr against terrorism, religious extremism and corruption in Sindh.

== G.M Syed Centre ==
The G.M Syed Centre (Sindhi: جي ايم سيد عمارت) is the residence and office of the party at Jamshoro, established by Syed Jalal Mehmood Shah, grandson of Saaen G.M Syed. Many researchers are offered food and residence in the world-notable library of G.M Syed established within the centre. It is the place of learning for many Sindhi nationalists, scholars, researchers, and common people.

== See also ==
- Dodo Maheri
