= Qadir Magsi =

Pakistani politician (born 1962)

- Born: Thatta, Sindh, Pakistan
- Education: Liaquat University of Medical and Health Sciences
- Occupation: Politician
- Political party: STP (1991-present)
- Other political affiliations: TTAP (2024-present)
- Website: www.stpparty.org

Qadir Magsi (Note: Sindhi: قادر مگسي) (Sindhi:قادر مگسي Urdu: قادر مگسی )(25 December 1962) is a Pakistani politician from the Sindh Taraqi Pasand Party. After the defeat in the 2013 Pakistani general election, seven senior leaders announced their resignation en bloc from the Sindh Taraqi Pasand Party and blamed that Qadir Magsi flawed policies that led to the party's defeat.

== Early life and education ==
Magsi was born into a Sindhi-Baloch family on 25 December 1962 in Thatta. He received primary and intermediate education in Thatta. Later he joined Liaquat University of Medical and Health Sciences Jamshoro L.U.M.H.S) in 1981 for MBBS. In 1982, he became member of Jeay Sindh Students' Federation (JSSF) in LMC unit.

Magsi later established Taraqi Pasand Wing. He has been imprisoned various times on mass murder and genocide charges. Magsi converted his Tarqi Pasand Wing into The Sindh Taraqi Pasand Party (STP) on March 21, 1991, he then became the founding chairman of the party.

== Magsi for united Pakistan ==
On March 24, 2015, while addressing 24th annual motherland day public meeting in Qasimabad Town, Hyderabad, STPP Chief Dr Magsi urged the Sindhi nationalists to give up demand for secession from Pakistan. He further said: "The breakup of Pakistan will immediately lead to the division of Sindh into many parts. The terrorists employed for this agenda of foreign powers are working on this scheme in Sindh".

== Support for Zarb-e-Azb ==
Magsi has expressed his unwavering support for the ongoing military operation Zarb-e-Azb by Pakistani Army in North Waziristan against the banned terrorist outfits. He demanded a full-scale operation until there were no more terrorists left all over the country.

== Magsi and MQM ==
Qadir has criticized MQM on many occasions. He has accused MQM for propaganda of new province on the agenda of international agents and suggested MQM to shun ethnicity politics.

== Latifabad Massacre ==
He was the leader of the mobs who killed 200+ muhajirs in 1988 Latifabad Massacre. Zulfiqar Mirza held Qadir Magsi responsible for the 250 Sindhis killed in MQM violence retaliation in Karachi.

== Bibliography ==
- Book Aakhir Kyoo (Written by Dr Shagufta Faraz)
