= Sindhi nationalism =

Ideology asserting that the Sindhis are a distinct nation

Sindhi nationalism (Sindhi:سنڌي قومپرستي) is an ideology that claims that the Sindhis, an ethnolinguistic group native to the Pakistani province of Sindh, form a separate nation. After Bangladesh became independent in 1971, G.M. Syed gave a new direction to this nationalism, founding the Jeay Sindh Mahaz in 1972 and presenting the idea of Sindhudesh, a separate homeland for Sindhis.

According to a 2009 report by the Pew Research Center, 55% of Sindhis in Pakistan identified themselves primarily as Pakistani, 28% identified first as Sindhi, and 16% viewed both identities equally.

== Background ==
G.M. Syed, a Sindhi is considered the founder of modern Sindhi nationalism. However, Sindhi nationalists stand divided upon the idea of a separate country or autonomy within Pakistan, ultimately resulting in the weakening of Sindhi nationalism. Sindhu Desh ji Dharti Todhe (To you, O land of Sindhu desh) is the anthem of Sindhi nationalists.

=== Independence of Sindh ===
The Sindhi nationalist movement's demands ranged from greater cultural, economic and political rights, to political autonomy, and to outright secession from Pakistan and the creation of an independent state referred to as Sindhudesh. It was founded by G. M. Syed in 1972 to separate Sindh from Pakistan. Sindhi separatists believe that the Sindhi people suffer from disenfranchisement at the hands of Pakistan's Punjabi majority. In 1972 Syed, the considered founder of Sindhi nationalism, formed an organization, the Jeay Sindh Mahaz. Later the JSM divided into many factions, currently the two main of which are the JSQM and JSMM, which believe in the continuance of political struggle,

=== Militant acts ===
The Sindhi nationalist Sindhudesh Liberation Army is a militant organization of Sindhi nationalist parties in Sindh. The Sindhudesh Liberation Army became publicly known in 2010, after it claimed a bomb blast on railway tracks near Hyderabad, Pakistan. In October 2012, the Sindhudesh Liberation Army was designated as a terrorist organisation by the Government of Pakistan.

=== Rights for Sindh according to 1940 Resolution ===
In Sindh province many nationalist parties other than these separatist nationalist parties have been demanding the rights of Sindhi people. According to the 1940 Lahore resolution within the framework of Pakistan, it was demanded that Sindhis be given a separate state. Major parties that advocate this rhetoric are the Awami Tehreek led by Rasool Bux Palijo, who formerly worked with G.M. Syed but parted ways after Syed's call for a separate homeland for Sindhis, the Sindh United Party led by G.M. Syed's grandson Syed Jalal Mehmood Shah and the Sindh Taraqi Pasand Party led by Qadir Magsi.

== Political parties ==
- Awami Tahreek
- Jeay Sindh Qaumi Mahaz
- Sindh National Front
- Sindh United Party
- Sindh Taraqi Pasand Party
- Jeay Sindh Muttahida Mahaz

== See also ==
- Human rights abuses in Sindh
- Insurgency in Sindh
