= Sindhudesh movement =

Sindhi separatist movement in Pakistan

Flag of the Sindhudesh movement

The Sindhudesh movement is a separatist movement that advocates to create a country for the Sindhi people by establishing an ethnonationalist sovereign state called Sindhudesh (Note: Sindhi: سنڌو ديش, lit. 'Country of Sindhis') in the region of Sindh.

The movement was founded in 1972 by Sindhi nationalist leader G. M. Syed in the aftermath of Bangladesh's independence from Pakistan. Syed, who was one of the founding fathers of Pakistan, founded the Jeay Sindh Mahaz (JSM) and led campaigns promoting Sindhi identity and language after being influenced by Bengali nationalism. The movement declined greatly after the death of Syed in 1995. He was succeeded as chairman of JSM by activist Bashir Khan Qureshi. The Jeay Sindh Muttahida Mahaz (JSMM) was founded in 2000 by Kabul-based activist Shafi Muhammad Burfat.

The Sindhudesh Liberation Army (SLA), founded in 2007, gave a violent turn to the movement by initiating an insurgency in Sindh. The SLA, believed by Pakistani authorities to be linked to JSMM, was responsible for low-intensity bomb explosions in remote parts of Sindh. The JSMM was banned in 2013 and the SLA became defunct in the late 2010s. Another group, the Sindhudesh Revolutionary Army (SRA), was formed around 2020 and claimed multiple terrorist attacks throughout Sindh, including the provincial capital Karachi.

However, the cause of Sindhudesh has largely died with Sindhi nationalist groups, such as the Sindh Taraqi Pasand Party, advocating for Sindhi nationalism within the federation of Pakistan and condemning separatism. No Sindhi nationalist party has ever been voted into power in Sindh at any level of government. In recent years, several Sindhi nationalists have deserted the ideology and joined mainstream politics due to disillusionment within ranks, and lack of public support.

== History ==
=== Calls for beginning ===
In 1972 G. M. Syed proposed the formation of an independent nation for the Sindhis under the name Sindhudesh. He was the first nationalist politician in Pakistan to call for the independence of Sindh in a Pakistan. He gave a new direction to Sindhi nationalism, founded the Jeay Sindh Tehreek in 1972 and presented the idea of Sindhudesh. The movement for Sindhi language and identity led by Syed drew inspiration from the Bengali language movement. In post-independence Pakistan, the strategy followed by the Pakistani state led Syed to come to a conclusion that the Sindhis would not be given due importance in the country.

With his political base largely weakened after election, Syed later advanced his position towards openly demanding separation from Pakistan and the build-up of an independent Sindhudesh in his books Heenyar Pakistan khey tuttan khappey (Now Pakistan Should Disintegrate) and Sindhu Desh — A Nation in Chains.

==== Reemergence of Sindhi Nationalism ====
After the assassination of former Prime Minister of Pakistan, Benazir Bhutto, ethnic unrest arose. Sindhi nationalists judged the country was being used to the advantage of people from non-Sindhi ethnic groups, Establishment dominance in the defence sector and believe this to be the cause of recent troubles in Sindh (see Sindhi nationalism).

== Outfits ==
Some nationalist parties and associations are banned for supposed terrorist, anti-state and sabotage activities by the Pakistani government.

=== Sindhudesh Liberation Army ===
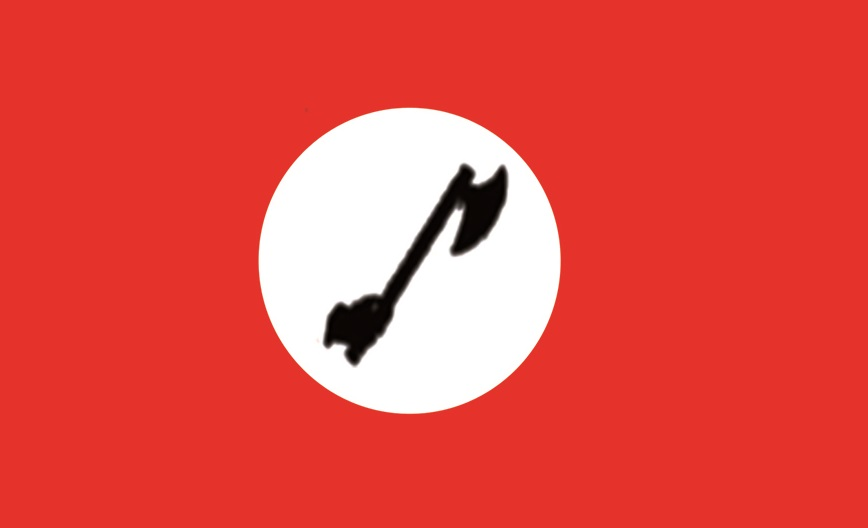
Alternative flag of Sindhudesh used by the SLA

The Sindhudesh Liberation Army or SLA is an active militant group based in the Sindh province of Pakistan. A series of minor blasts took place on railway lines — the attacks carried out between November 2010, and February 2011 were claimed by the SDLA, who left pamphlets on the scene that mentioned “atrocities” being carried out against Sindh and promising to continue their “struggle” till Sindh was granted “freedom”. The attacks were condemned by fellow Sindhi nationalists such as Dr Qadir Magsi of the Jeay Sindh Tarraqi Passand Party, who warned of negative consequences from violence.

The group is currently active.

=== Jeay Sindh Qaumi Mahaz ===
Jeay Sindh Qaumi Mahaz is a "merger/integration" of all the nationalist factions of Jeay Sindh or Sindhudesh movement which were functioning separately before the demise of veteran Sindhi nationalist ideologue GM Syed. Bashir Khan Qureshi was first chairman of party till his death and one of the most popular leader of Sindhudesh movement, widely regarded as hero of Sindh.

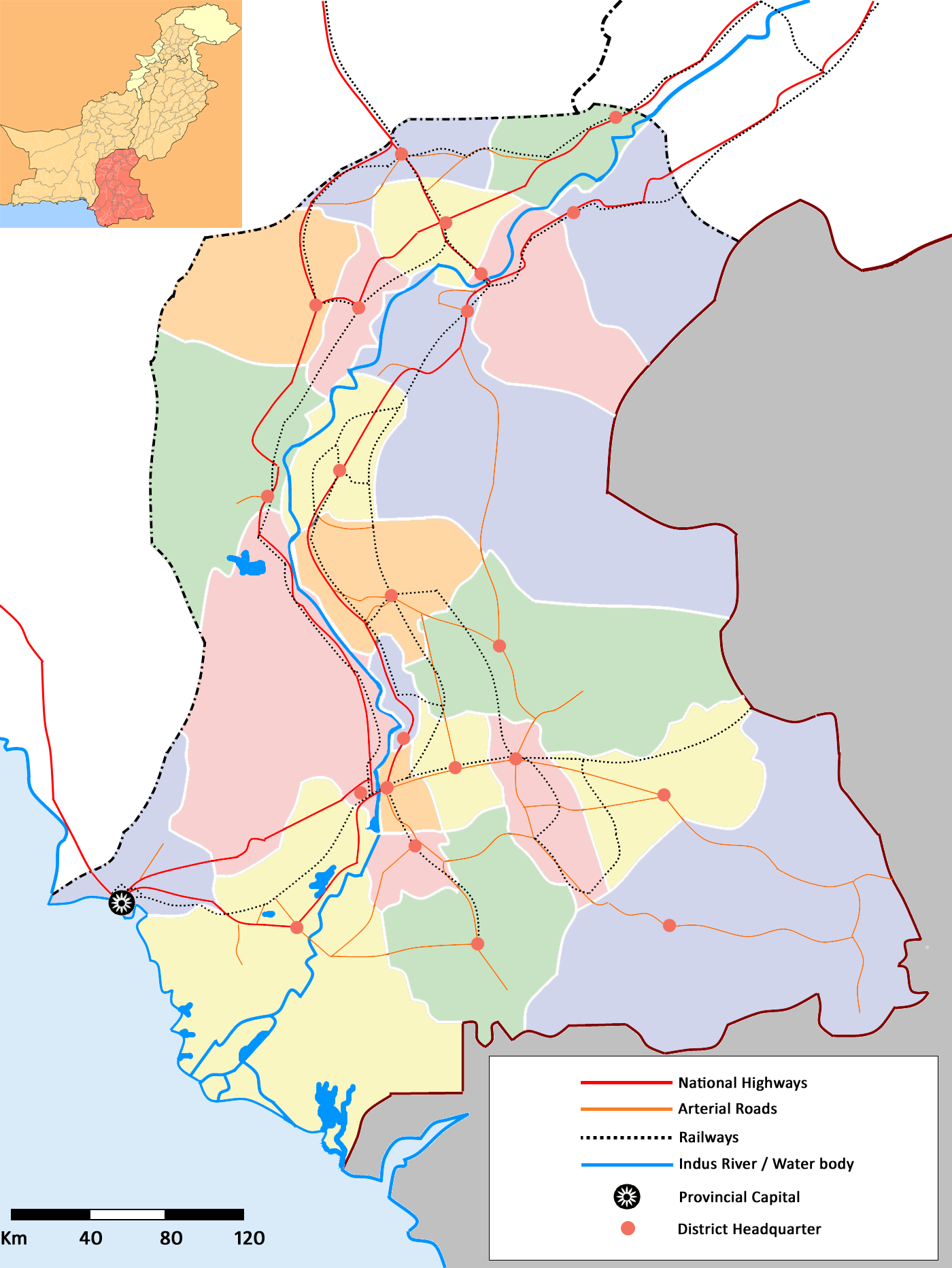

=== Jeay Sindh Muttahida Mahaz ===
JSMM is one of the major separatist political party in Sindh, Pakistan, that believes in the separation of Sindhudesh from Pakistan. Founded in the year 2000, by the veteran Sindhi nationalists belonging to the Sindhudesh movement who left JSQM. The founder and the current Chairman of party Shafi Muhammad Burfat is living in exile in Germany under political asylum.

=== Jeay Sindh Students' Federation ===
Jeay Sindh Students’ Federation is the student wing of various separatist organizations struggling for the freedom of Sindhudesh following the ideology of G. M. Syed, founded in 1969. JSSF was a nationalist outfit which emerged from Anti-Unitary System Struggle in the late 1960s and later joined G. M. Syed in his ideology of a separate homeland for Sindhis in 1972. Since then, it has been working as the students’ front of the Jeay Sindh or Sindhudesh movement.

=== Sindh National Movement Party ===
A new left wing party for a politically, culturally, economically and geographically independent Sindh was formed in December 2011. It wants to see Sindh as it was in 1843 before the British conquered it and opposes the development of Zulfikarabad, referring to it as a "new Israel".

== Diaspora ==
Sindhudesh generally claims the Sindh province of Pakistan.. Sindhi nationalists claims the Kutch region of India, the Lasbela District of Balochistan, and South Punjab as part of Sindh.

=== Sindhis in India ===
Sindhis in India, most of whom had to be relocated out of Sindh after Partition, leaving behind their property as evacuee trusts under reciprocal government supervision. After the Partition of India, approximately 10 million Hindus and Sikhs migrated to India, while nearly an equal number of Muslims migrated to newly created Pakistan from India. Hindu Sindhis were expected to stay in Sindh following the partition, as there were good relations between Hindu and Muslim Sindhis. At the time of partition there were 1,400,000 Hindu Sindhis most were concentrated in cities such as Hyderabad, Karachi, Shikarpur, and Sukkur.

There are some suggestions for a Sindhi political party in India as an ethnic empowerment movement for the largest minority group in Gujarat. Proposed by prominent individuals participating in the Chetichand celebration within the Sindhi community in Ahmedabad such as the Chief Minister at the time, Shri Narendra Modi (later 14th Prime minister of India). Narendra Modi, in his speech gave an example of the Jewish acquisition of Jerusalem and suggested "If those who dream have strength, everything is possible" The Gandhian carnival at Delhi's doorsteps won pan-Indian support for Sindhudesh.

The concept of Sindhudesh is also supported by the Sindhis in India, most of whom had to be relocated out of Sindh after Partition, with post-partition migrants to Sindh angry at the "non-co-operation" in the killing of Hindus; and communal hatred multiplied post partition. according to a Sindhi nationalist organisation "The only backdrop for Sindhudesh movement has been the absence of national capitalist because of the migration of Sindhi Hindus from Sindh to India after partition. That’s why Sindhudesh Movement has been lacking economic, political and diplomatic means to start mass uprising against the decades of slavery, humiliation and oppression. Therefore, the independence of Sindh and establishment of secular republic of Sindhudesh is the need of the history and key to regional peace."

== Public support in Pakistan ==
Reliable public opinion data on support for Sindhi nationalism or separatism in Pakistan are limited, as no major nationally representative survey has directly measured attitudes toward Sindhi independence or the Sindhudesh movement. However, broader surveys on identity provide relevant context. A 2009 survey conducted by the Pew Research Center found that among ethnic Sindhis, 55 per cent of respondents identified primarily as Pakistani, while 28 per cent identified primarily as Sindhi and 16 per cent identified with both equally, indicating that although ethnic identity remains significant among Sindhis, national identity continues to predominate.

Academic research and political analyses suggest that explicit support for Sindhi separatism has remained marginal. Studies of ethnic nationalism in Pakistan note that Sindhi nationalist groups advocating independence have failed to secure significant electoral success, while mainstream political parties emphasising provincial autonomy within Pakistan continue to dominate Sindh’s electoral politics. For example, in 2012, a Sindhudesh rally organised by the Sindhi nationalist party Jeay Sindh Tehreek was held in Karachi. The organisers had claimed that the event, described as a "million march", would attract approximately one million participants; however, independent estimates placed attendance at around 3,000 to 4,000 people.

== See also ==
- Karachi Province movement
