= G. M. Syed =

Sindhi nationalist and politician

Saeen Ghulam Murtaza Syed
- غلام مرتضي سيد
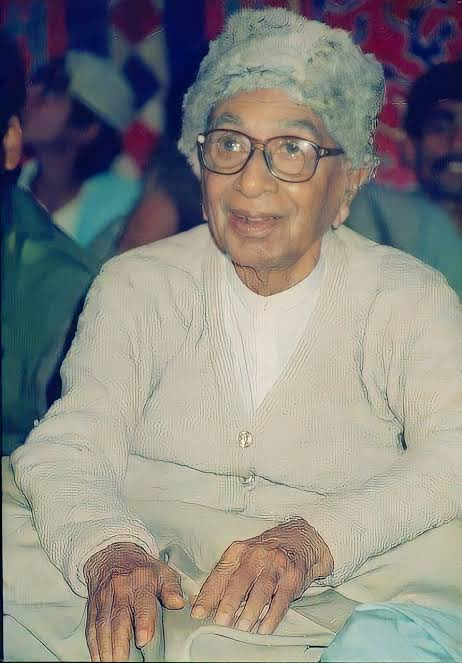
- G.M Syed in ceremony program

Minister of Education of Sind
- In office 18 March 1940 – 7 March 1941
- Premier: Mir Bandeh Ali Khan Talpur
- Governor: Lancelot Graham; Hugh Dow

Personal details
- Born: 17 January 1904 Sann, than Karachi District (Sind) Bombay Presidency, British India (present-day Jamshoro District Sindh, Pakistan)
- Died: 25 April 1995 (age 91) Karachi, Sindh, Pakistan
- Resting place: Sann, Sindh
- Children: Syed Amir Hyder Shah; Syed Imdad Muhammad Shah; Zarin Taj; Shama Aimen; Dr. Durreshahwar
- Parent: Syed Mohammed Shah Kazmi (father)
- Known for: Sindhi nationalist

Ghulam Murtaza Syed (Note: Sindhi: غلام مرتضيٰ سيد) (17 January 1904 – 25 April 1995), known as G. M. Syed was a Sindhi nationalist and politician, who is known for his scholarly work, later proposing ideological groundwork for separate Sindhi identity and laying the foundations of Sindhudesh movement. He is regarded as one of the founding fathers of modern Sindhi nationalism. He was known as "Saeen" by his supporters.

G.M Syed started his political career at the age of 16, when he organised Khilafat Conference at his hometown, Sann, on 17 March 1920. Syed was one of the earliest Sindhi politician who sought the creation of Islamic Pakistan, and became a vocal supporter of the Two-Nation Theory, advocated by the Muslim League leader Muhammad Ali Jinnah; Syed's political propaganda for a purely 'Muslim-dominated state' is witnessed after the Manzilgah incident, However, once the independent nation was formed, he became a political prisoner of the state in 1948, due to differences with the country's leadership. He restated his political propaganda of ideologies which advocated for Islamic principles, secularism, Sindhi nationalism and laid the basis for Sindhudesh Movement. He spent approximately thirty years of his life in imprisonment and house arrests for his political views. He was entitled as the prisoner of conscience by Amnesty International in 1995. He died during his house arrest in Karachi on 26 April 1995.

After his father's death, he grew up with his father's best family friend Rais Faqir Bux Khan Kaachhi, whom at that time, was the chief of the Kaachhi tribe, Rais Faqir Bux Khan Kaachhi was GM Syed's Ustaad and a uncle like figure to him and protected him from the enemies of GM. Syed's father. Gm syed had also mentioned Rais Faqir Bux Khan Kaachhi in his books.

== Early life ==
=== Childhood: 1904–15 ===
G. M. Syed was born to the Sadat family of Sindh in the town of Sann on 17 January 1904. He was an infant when his father, Syed Mohammed Shah Kazmi, was killed in a family feud on 1 November 1905. After the death of his father, Syed was the only male infant in the family, so in 1906 the British Government took temporary custody of the family property through the Court of Wards, giving the family a monthly pension. He had five years of primary education, in the Sindhi, from the age of six, ending in 1915. The female elders of his family and Mother Haneefa Bibi decided to home-school him thereafter in order to safeguard him from feuding as he was the only male heir in the family. He was taught Persian and English at home.

=== Teenage: 1920–24 ===
Syed became politically active through participation in the Khilafat Movement. He first attended Khilafat Conference held on 7th, 8th, and 9 February 1920 in Larkana. He was inspired by the speeches of Abul Kalam Azad, Abdul Bari Firangi Mahali, Maulana Shaukat Ali and Shaikh Abdul Majeed Sindhi. He himself called upon the next Khilafat Conference on 17 March 1920 in his hometown Sann. Two days after this conference, his native town Sann observed a shutter-down strike in protest against the injustices of the Allied Powers against the Ottoman Caliphate on 20 March 1920. He remained active throughout the entire Khilafat Movement afterward. He addressed the Khilafat Conference held on 26 March 1920, in Makhdoom Bilawal's Mausoleum as the youngest speaker. He was of a short-height and stood upon a wooden chair to be visible to the audience during his speech. He met Mahatma Gandhi on 27 April 1921 at the Sann railway station while Mr. Gandhi was traveling from Dadu to Hyderabad. Gandhi instructed him to wear Khadi. Syed visited the office of the Collector in Karachi on 23 June 1921 to free his lands from the custody of Court of Wards but he was refused. He filed a complaint against the Collector and Mukhtiarkar on 4 December 1922, for hurdling the delivery of his lands from custody. Finally, he was awarded his lands back from the custody of Court of Wards in the year 1924, after two years of legal prosecution.

== Political activism ==
G.M Syed was the founder of Sindh Awami Mahaz, which went on to join the National Awami Party (National Peoples Party). Like Ibrahim Joyo, Syed blended Sindhi nationalism with Communism and Sufism through the ideas of Gandhi and Marx.

Syed Sindhi's position brought him ample opportunity to have free income through tributes, cash offerings and landed property. This lifestyle was rejected by him, subsequently he plunged into politics with enthusiasm. Politically, he evolved and traveled from Pan-Islamist to Indian nationalist and then Pakistani nationalist, having joined Muslim League; and ended with being a Sindhi nationalist.

== AV School ==
In the early 1920s, Syed opened Anglo-Vernacular (AV) school in his village Sann, where education for certain language classes was free of cost. AV School offered combo of Sindhi education with English language. The school also offered options of Arabic, French and Persian languages. Prominent Sindhi educationist Ibrahim Joyo was also schooled at AV.

== Timeline ==
- At the early age of fourteen years, Syed started his career as an activist.
- In 1919, became Chairman of the School Board of his own tehsil. He later became its president.
- In 1929, was elected as a President of Karachi District Local Board.
- In 1930, organized the Sindh Hari (Peasants) Conference and became its Secretary.
- In 1937, was for the first time elected a member of Sindh Legislative Assembly.
- In 1938, joined the All-India Muslim League. In 1940, he became Minister of Education in Sindh.
- In 1941, became one of the members of the Central Committee of the Muslim League.
- In 1943, became President of the Sindh Muslim League.
- In 1946, conditions compelled him to dissociate from the Muslim League, and formed a new party named the Progressive Muslim League. The same year, he was elected as leader of the Coalition Party in the Sindh Assembly.
- In 1954, acted as Chairman of Sindhi Adabi Board.
- In 1966, founded Bazm-e-Soofia-e Sindh.
- In 1969, formed the Sindh United Front.
- In 1972, formed Jeay Sindh Mahaz.

== Jeay Sindh movement ==
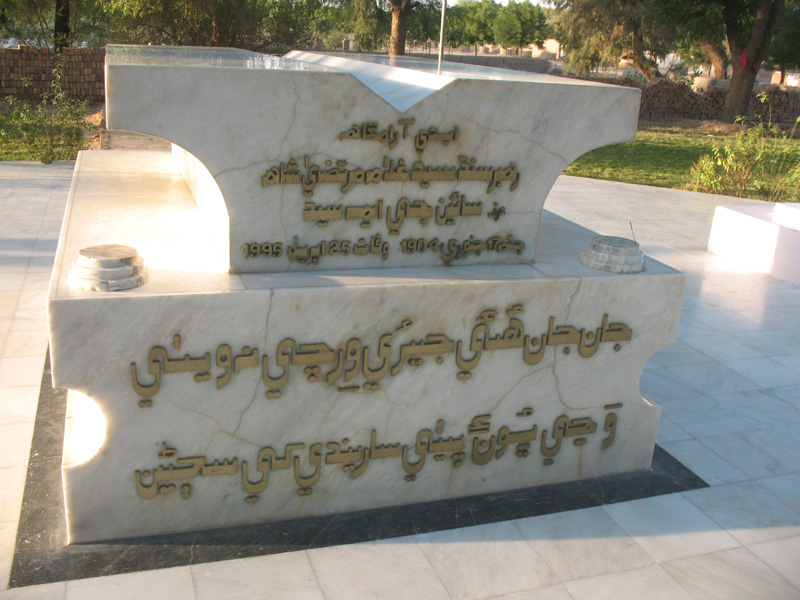
Final resting place of sain G.M Syed

Syed was the architect of "Jeay-Sindh" movement, aimed at achieving Sindhudesh. He is also the author of more than 60 books, (with) subjects ranging from politics, religion, culture, literature and commentaries on famous poet Shah Abdul Latif Bhitai. For his part as a political thinker, literary figure and mystic, he dominated the political arena of pre and post-partition era for decades, while he remained in jail for 30 years.

On 19 January 1992, Syed was put under house arrest, his house was declared a sub-jail. He died on 25 April 1995.

== Books ==
Syed was the author of more than sixty books, written mainly in Sindhi, but also English and Urdu. His works are on numerous subjects, ranging from literature to politics, religion and culture. Due to his breath of knowledge, he has been described by the Dutch scholar of Islam Oskar Verkaaik as "in many ways a remarkably productive, original, and largely autodidact intellectual, creating his own personal interpretation of Islam out of a range of intellectual influences such as 19th-century Islamic reform, Darwinian evolution theory, theosophy, 18th century Sindhi poetry, Marxism, classical Sufism, German idealism, and probably more."

Some of his well-known books are:

- Janam Guzarium Jin Sein (In Sindhi language)
- Dayar Dil Dastan-e- Muhabt (In Sindhi language)
- Sindh Ja Soorma (In Sindhi language)
- Sindh Speaks (English)
- Struggle for New Sindh (English)
- Religion and Reality (English)
- Shah Latif's Message (Sindhi: لطيف جو پيغام) is a 1992 book written by GM Syed about the life of Sindhi Sufi poet Shah Abdul Latif Bhittai and his teachings. The book was originally published in Sindhi. It received an English translation by Egnert Azariah. Syed depicts Latif "as a nationalist and patriotic poet because of his immense love and commitment to Sindh and its people."
- A Nation in Chains (English)

== See also ==
- Hyder Manzil
- Rasool Bux Palijo
- Abdul Wahid Aresar
- Shafi Muhammad Burfat
- Bashir Ahmed Qureshi
- G.M Syed Edifice
