= Makhado Local Municipality elections =

The Makhado Local Municipality is a Local Municipality in Limpopo, South Africa. The council consists of seventy-five members elected by mixed-member proportional representation. Thirty-eight councillors are elected by first-past-the-post voting in thirty-eight wards, while the remaining thirty-seven are chosen from party lists so that the total number of party representatives is proportional to the number of votes received. In the election of 1 November 2021 the African National Congress (ANC) won a majority of sixty-two seats.

== Results ==
The following table shows the composition of the council after past elections.

Event	ACDP	ANC	COPE	DA	EFF	PAC	UDM	XIM	Other	Total
2000 election	2	57	—	4	—	1	1	1	2	68
2006 election	2	62	—	4	—	1	1	1	2	73
2011 election	1	64	3	5	—	1	—	0	1	75
2016 election	1	56	1	9	7	0	—	1	8	75
2021 election	1	62	0	5	4	0	—	0	3	75

== December 2000 election ==
The following table shows the results of the 2000 election.

Party	Ward			List			Total seats
Party	Votes	%	Seats	Votes	%	Seats	Total seats
African National Congress	71,536	82.74	33	70,521	81.90	24	57
Democratic Alliance	5,502	6.36	1	5,293	6.15	3	4
African Christian Democratic Party	3,235	3.74	0	2,671	3.10	2	2
Ximoko Party	1,349	1.56	0	1,996	2.32	1	1
Pan Africanist Congress of Azania	1,490	1.72	0	1,376	1.60	1	1
Dabalorivhuwa Patriotic Front	809	0.94	0	1,748	2.03	0	0
United Democratic Movement	779	0.90	0	1,559	1.81	1	1
Independent candidates	1,496	1.73	1				1
Azanian People's Organisation	266	0.31	0	937	1.09	1	1
Total	86,462	100.00	35	86,101	100.00	33	68
Valid votes	86,462	98.39		86,101	97.87		
Invalid/blank votes	1,416	1.61		1,873	2.13		
Total votes	87,878	100.00		87,974	100.00		
Registered voters/turnout	183,747	47.83		183,747	47.88		

== March 2006 election ==
The following table shows the results of the 2006 election.

Party	Ward			List			Total seats
Party	Votes	%	Seats	Votes	%	Seats	Total seats
African National Congress	82,319	81.35	36	86,525	85.77	26	62
Democratic Alliance	6,536	6.46	0	5,071	5.03	4	4
Independent Democrats	3,161	3.12	1	2,705	2.68	1	2
African Christian Democratic Party	1,976	1.95	0	2,278	2.26	2	2
Independent candidates	2,936	2.90	0				0
Ximoko Party	1,199	1.18	0	1,352	1.34	1	1
Pan Africanist Congress of Azania	1,186	1.17	0	915	0.91	1	1
United Democratic Movement	978	0.97	0	660	0.65	1	1
Freedom Front Plus	555	0.55	0	461	0.46	0	0
Azanian People's Organisation	271	0.27	0	554	0.55	0	0
Dabalorivhuwa Patriotic Front	71	0.07	0	354	0.35	0	0
Total	101,188	100.00	37	100,875	100.00	36	73
Valid votes	101,188	98.73		100,875	98.47		
Invalid/blank votes	1,299	1.27		1,563	1.53		
Total votes	102,487	100.00		102,438	100.00		
Registered voters/turnout	217,641	47.09		217,641	47.07		

== May 2011 election ==
The following table shows the results of the 2011 election.

Party	Ward			List			Total seats
Party	Votes	%	Seats	Votes	%	Seats	Total seats
African National Congress	92,212	82.93	36	94,863	86.47	28	64
Democratic Alliance	7,256	6.53	1	7,178	6.54	4	5
Congress of the People	4,471	4.02	0	4,527	4.13	3	3
Independent candidates	5,000	4.50	1				1
African Christian Democratic Party	1,203	1.08	0	1,046	0.95	1	1
Pan Africanist Congress of Azania	525	0.47	0	422	0.38	1	1
African People's Convention	177	0.16	0	637	0.58	0	0
Azanian People's Organisation	200	0.18	0	423	0.39	0	0
Ximoko Party	79	0.07	0	318	0.29	0	0
National Freedom Party	41	0.04	0	177	0.16	0	0
United Christian Democratic Party	35	0.03	0	113	0.10	0	0
Total	111,199	100.00	38	109,704	100.00	37	75
Valid votes	111,199	98.79		109,704	98.05		
Invalid/blank votes	1,365	1.21		2,181	1.95		
Total votes	112,564	100.00		111,885	100.00		
Registered voters/turnout	231,136	48.70		231,136	48.41		

== August 2016 election ==
The following table shows the results of the 2016 election.

Party	Ward			List			Total seats
Party	Votes	%	Seats	Votes	%	Seats	Total seats
African National Congress	61,221	74.11	37	61,878	75.14	19	56
Democratic Alliance	9,446	11.44	1	9,272	11.26	8	9
Economic Freedom Fighters	7,105	8.60	0	7,343	8.92	7	7
Ximoko Party	803	0.97	0	814	0.99	1	1
Congress of the People	875	1.06	0	702	0.85	1	1
African Christian Democratic Party	820	0.99	0	643	0.78	1	1
Independent candidates	1,140	1.38	0				0
Freedom Front Plus	468	0.57	0	399	0.48	0	0
International Revelation Congress	170	0.21	0	272	0.33	0	0
South African United Party	157	0.19	0	183	0.22	0	0
Azanian People's Organisation	108	0.13	0	171	0.21	0	0
Pan Africanist Congress of Azania	110	0.13	0	160	0.19	0	0
Inkatha Freedom Party	27	0.03	0	179	0.22	0	0
Unemployment Movement SA	94	0.11	0	94	0.11	0	0
Value Education Nationalism Democracy in Africa	18	0.02	0	150	0.18	0	0
Leadership Forum	42	0.05	0	90	0.11	0	0
Total	82,604	100.00	38	82,350	100.00	37	75
Valid votes	82,604	98.85		82,350	98.66		
Invalid/blank votes	964	1.15		1,122	1.34		
Total votes	83,568	100.00		83,472	100.00		
Registered voters/turnout	182,361	45.83		182,361	45.77		

== November 2021 election ==
The following table shows the results of the 2021 election.

Party	Ward			List			Total seats
Party	Votes	%	Seats	Votes	%	Seats	Total seats
African National Congress	59,568	78.18	37	61,703	81.55	25	62
Democratic Alliance	5,293	6.95	1	5,260	6.95	4	5
Economic Freedom Fighters	4,168	5.47	0	4,515	5.97	4	4
Independent candidates	3,836	5.03	0				0
International Revelation Congress	664	0.87	0	805	1.06	1	1
Freedom Front Plus	675	0.89	0	669	0.88	1	1
African Christian Democratic Party	540	0.71	0	614	0.81	1	1
African People's Convention	437	0.57	0	462	0.61	1	1
Congress of the People	468	0.61	0	378	0.50	0	0
Pan Africanist Congress of Azania	61	0.08	0	361	0.48	0	0
Movement Democratic Congress	131	0.17	0	190	0.25	0	0
Able Leadership	122	0.16	0	137	0.18	0	0
Azanian People's Organisation	24	0.03	0	198	0.26	0	0
Ximoko Party	79	0.10	0	138	0.18	0	0
Patriotic Alliance	62	0.08	0	109	0.14	0	0
Unemployment Movement SA	58	0.08	0	70	0.09	0	0
United Independent Movement	9	0.01	0	50	0.07	0	0
Total	76,195	100.00	38	75,659	100.00	37	75
Valid votes	76,195	98.73		75,659	98.35		
Invalid/blank votes	979	1.27		1,266	1.65		
Total votes	77,174	100.00		76,925	100.00		
Registered voters/turnout	180,288	42.81		180,288	42.67		

=== By-elections from November 2021 ===
The following by-elections were held to fill vacant ward seats in the period since the election in November 2021.

Date	Ward	Party of the previous councillor	Party of the newly elected councillor
14 Aug 2024	35	African National Congress	African National Congress
2 Apr 2025	9	African National Congress	African National Congress
