= Collins Chabane Local Municipality elections =

The Collins Chabane Local Municipality is a Local Municipality in Limpopo, South Africa, formed in 2016. The council consists of seventy-one members elected by mixed-member proportional representation. Thirty-six are elected by first-past-the-post voting in thirty-six wards, while the remaining thirty-five are chosen from party lists so that the total number of party representatives is proportional to the number of votes received. In the election of 1 November 2021. The African National Congress (ANC) won a majority of 55 seats on the council.

== Results ==
The following table shows the composition of the council after past elections.

Event	ACDP	ANC	DA	EFF	PAC	Other	Total
2016 election	1	60	2	6	1	1	71
2021 election	1	55	1	7	1	6	71

== August 2016 election ==
The following table shows the results of the 2016 election.

Party	Ward			List			Total seats
Party	Votes	%	Seats	Votes	%	Seats	Total seats
African National Congress	59,191	83.87	35	59,499	84.41	25	60
Economic Freedom Fighters	6,148	8.71	0	6,216	8.82	6	6
Democratic Alliance	1,704	2.41	0	1,752	2.49	2	2
Independent candidates	1,646	2.33	1				1
Ximoko Party	619	0.88	0	732	1.04	1	1
African Christian Democratic Party	346	0.49	0	945	1.34	1	1
Congress of the People	466	0.66	0	376	0.53	0	0
African People's Convention	109	0.15	0	382	0.54	0	0
Malamulele Community Association	155	0.22	0	274	0.39	0	0
South African United Party	136	0.19	0	184	0.26	0	0
Pan Africanist Congress of Azania	42	0.06	0	101	0.14	0	0
Agang South Africa	10	0.01	0	31	0.04	0	0
Total	70,572	100.00	36	70,492	100.00	35	71
Valid votes	70,572	98.59		70,492	98.54		
Invalid/blank votes	1,008	1.41		1,045	1.46		
Total votes	71,580	100.00		71,537	100.00		
Registered voters/turnout	158,218	45.24		158,218	45.21		

== November 2021 election ==
The following table shows the results of the 2021 election.

Party	Ward			List			Total seats
Party	Votes	%	Seats	Votes	%	Seats	Total seats
African National Congress	55,324	73.23	35	58,524	77.79	20	55
Economic Freedom Fighters	6,677	8.84	0	7,155	9.51	7	7
Independent candidates	6,585	8.72	1				1
Able Leadership	1,867	2.47	0	1,856	2.47	2	2
Democratic Alliance	1,191	1.58	0	1,310	1.74	1	1
Know Your Neighbour	812	1.07	0	809	1.08	1	1
African People's Convention	619	0.82	0	678	0.90	1	1
African Christian Democratic Party	635	0.84	0	646	0.86	1	1
Pan Africanist Congress of Azania	46	0.06	0	1,223	1.63	1	1
Ximoko Party	445	0.59	0	564	0.75	1	1
Decent Political Party	328	0.43	0	251	0.33	0	0
Gaza Movement for Change	207	0.27	0	254	0.34	0	0
Patriotic Alliance	152	0.20	0	299	0.40	0	0
Inkatha Freedom Party	66	0.09	0	350	0.47	0	0
Malamulele Community Association	150	0.20	0	249	0.33	0	0
Congress of the People	185	0.24	0	186	0.25	0	0
International Revelation Congress	54	0.07	0	242	0.32	0	0
Katekani Economic Power	129	0.17	0	141	0.19	0	0
Kingdom Covenant Democratic Party	2	0.00	0	196	0.26	0	0
Gazankulu Liberation Congress	41	0.05	0	120	0.16	0	0
Democratic Artists Party	5	0.01	0	105	0.14	0	0
Rise Up Africa / Tsoga Africa	24	0.03	0	77	0.10	0	0
Total	75,544	100.00	36	75,235	100.00	35	71
Valid votes	75,544	98.56		75,235	98.24		
Invalid/blank votes	1,101	1.44		1,345	1.76		
Total votes	76,645	100.00		76,580	100.00		
Registered voters/turnout	161,628	47.42		161,628	47.38		
