= Thulamela Local Municipality elections =

The Thulamela Local Municipality is a Local Municipality in Limpopo, South Africa. The council consists of eighty-one members elected by mixed-member proportional representation. Forty-one councillors are elected by first-past-the-post voting in forty-one wards, while the remaining forty are chosen from party lists so that the total number of party representatives is proportional to the number of votes received. In the election of 1 November 2021. The African National Congress (ANC) won a majority of 71 seats on the council.

== Results ==
The following table shows the composition of the council after past elections.

Event	ACDP	ANC	COPE	DA	EFF	IRC	PAC	UDM	XP	Other	Total
2000 election	2	55	—	4	—	—	2	2	2	1	68
2006 election	2	66	—	3	—	—	2	1	1	1	76
2011 election	1	70	2	3	—	—	3	1	0	0	80
2016 election	1	64	1	4	8	1	2	0	—	0	81
2021 election	1	71	—	2	4	1	1	0	—	1	81

== December 2000 election ==
The following table shows the results of the 2000 election.

Party	Ward			List			Total seats
Party	Votes	%	Seats	Votes	%	Seats	Total seats
African National Congress	61,482	78.45	36	59,625	75.90	19	55
Democratic Alliance	4,897	6.25	0	4,632	5.90	4	4
Dabalorivhuwa Patriotic Front	2,605	3.32	0	3,699	4.71	0	0
African Christian Democratic Party	2,457	3.14	0	2,385	3.04	2	2
Pan Africanist Congress of Azania	1,775	2.27	0	2,164	2.75	2	2
Ximoko Party	2,003	2.56	0	1,894	2.41	2	2
United Democratic Movement	1,727	2.20	0	2,111	2.69	2	2
Azanian People's Organisation	1,420	1.81	0	2,048	2.61	1	1
Total	78,366	100.00	36	78,558	100.00	32	68
Valid votes	78,366	98.62		78,558	98.82		
Invalid/blank votes	1,097	1.38		938	1.18		
Total votes	79,463	100.00		79,496	100.00		
Registered voters/turnout	201,932	39.35		201,932	39.37		

== March 2006 election ==
The following table shows the results of the 2006 election.

Party	Ward			List			Total seats
Party	Votes	%	Seats	Votes	%	Seats	Total seats
African National Congress	98,237	86.69	38	97,978	86.56	28	66
Democratic Alliance	3,726	3.29	0	3,607	3.19	3	3
Pan Africanist Congress of Azania	2,864	2.53	0	2,668	2.36	2	2
African Christian Democratic Party	2,837	2.50	0	2,657	2.35	2	2
Ximoko Party	1,632	1.44	0	1,792	1.58	1	1
Independent Democrats	1,374	1.21	0	1,066	0.94	1	1
United Democratic Movement	789	0.70	0	1,304	1.15	1	1
Black Consciousness Party	579	0.51	0	730	0.64	0	0
Dabalorivhuwa Patriotic Front	440	0.39	0	798	0.70	0	0
Azanian People's Organisation	170	0.15	0	593	0.52	0	0
Independent candidates	672	0.59	0				0
Total	113,320	100.00	38	113,193	100.00	38	76
Valid votes	113,320	98.92		113,193	98.69		
Invalid/blank votes	1,238	1.08		1,498	1.31		
Total votes	114,558	100.00		114,691	100.00		
Registered voters/turnout	250,755	45.69		250,755	45.74		

== May 2011 election ==
The following table shows the results of the 2011 election.

Party	Ward			List			Total seats
Party	Votes	%	Seats	Votes	%	Seats	Total seats
African National Congress	112,511	86.00	40	114,096	87.15	30	70
Pan Africanist Congress of Azania	5,148	3.94	0	4,781	3.65	3	3
Democratic Alliance	4,841	3.70	0	4,424	3.38	3	3
Congress of the People	3,312	2.53	0	3,546	2.71	2	2
African Christian Democratic Party	1,681	1.28	0	1,366	1.04	1	1
United Democratic Movement	1,079	0.82	0	1,085	0.83	1	1
Ximoko Party	615	0.47	0	736	0.56	0	0
Independent candidates	1,100	0.84	0				0
Black Consciousness Party	301	0.23	0	327	0.25	0	0
Azanian People's Organisation	124	0.09	0	318	0.24	0	0
National Freedom Party	79	0.06	0	164	0.13	0	0
Movement Democratic Party	33	0.03	0	77	0.06	0	0
Total	130,824	100.00	40	130,920	100.00	40	80
Valid votes	130,824	98.96		130,920	99.06		
Invalid/blank votes	1,372	1.04		1,248	0.94		
Total votes	132,196	100.00		132,168	100.00		
Registered voters/turnout	279,376	47.32		279,376	47.31		

== August 2016 election ==
The following table shows the results of the 2016 election.

Party	Ward			List			Total seats
Party	Votes	%	Seats	Votes	%	Seats	Total seats
African National Congress	80,661	78.22	41	81,728	79.35	23	64
Economic Freedom Fighters	10,193	9.88	0	10,346	10.05	8	8
Democratic Alliance	4,776	4.63	0	4,806	4.67	4	4
Pan Africanist Congress of Azania	2,315	2.24	0	2,151	2.09	2	2
Independent candidates	1,714	1.66	0				0
African Christian Democratic Party	768	0.74	0	737	0.72	1	1
International Revelation Congress	657	0.64	0	770	0.75	1	1
Congress of the People	746	0.72	0	662	0.64	1	1
United Democratic Movement	282	0.27	0	347	0.34	0	0
Leadership Forum	307	0.30	0	306	0.30	0	0
Service for All	287	0.28	0	320	0.31	0	0
South African United Party	303	0.29	0	283	0.27	0	0
Azanian People's Organisation	84	0.08	0	184	0.18	0	0
Value Education Nationalism Democracy in Africa	5	0.00	0	260	0.25	0	0
Inkatha Freedom Party	29	0.03	0	95	0.09	0	0
Total	103,127	100.00	41	102,995	100.00	40	81
Valid votes	103,127	99.01		102,995	98.96		
Invalid/blank votes	1,030	0.99		1,080	1.04		
Total votes	104,157	100.00		104,075	100.00		
Registered voters/turnout	227,096	45.86		227,096	45.83		

== November 2021 election ==
The following table shows the results of the 2021 election.

Party	Ward			List			Total seats
Party	Votes	%	Seats	Votes	%	Seats	Total seats
African National Congress	76,901	83.06	41	80,448	87.31	30	71
Economic Freedom Fighters	4,115	4.44	0	4,578	4.97	4	4
Independent candidates	5,301	5.73	0				0
Democratic Alliance	2,338	2.53	0	2,386	2.59	2	2
International Revelation Congress	1,299	1.40	0	1,514	1.64	1	1
Pan Africanist Congress of Azania	835	0.90	0	1,288	1.40	1	1
African Christian Democratic Party	862	0.93	0	885	0.96	1	1
African People's Convention	437	0.47	0	216	0.23	1	1
United Democratic Movement	166	0.18	0	169	0.18	0	0
Inkatha Freedom Party	69	0.07	0	201	0.22	0	0
Able Leadership	124	0.13	0	111	0.12	0	0
Azanian People's Organisation	42	0.05	0	116	0.13	0	0
Service for All	30	0.03	0	65	0.07	0	0
Know Your Neighbour	20	0.02	0	71	0.08	0	0
Patriotic Alliance	40	0.04	0	50	0.05	0	0
African People's Movement	9	0.01	0	41	0.04	0	0
Total	92,588	100.00	41	92,139	100.00	40	81
Valid votes	92,588	99.11		92,139	98.37		
Invalid/blank votes	828	0.89		1,529	1.63		
Total votes	93,416	100.00		93,668	100.00		
Registered voters/turnout	229,018	40.79		229,018	40.90		
