= Unrepresented Nations and Peoples Organization =

International organization formed in 1991

- Flag Logo

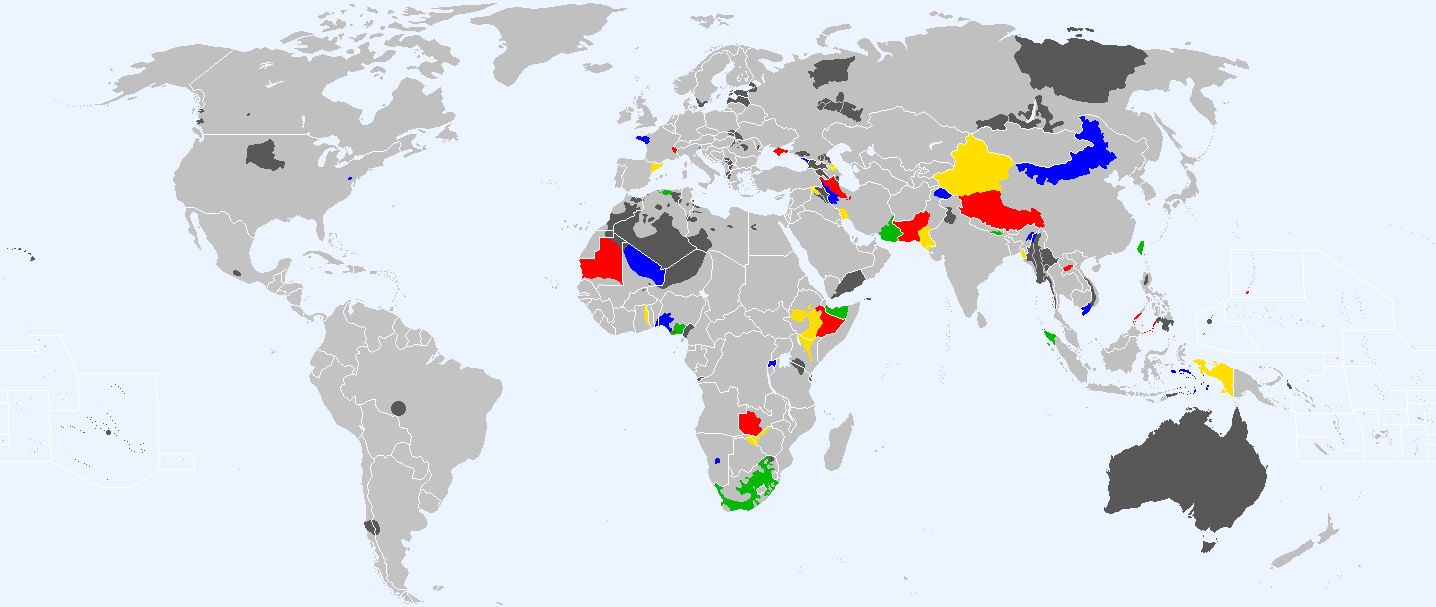
- Members of UNPO. Former members are in dark gray.
- Secretariat: Brussels; The Hague
- Membership: 38 groups

Leaders
  - President: Rubina Greenwood
  - Vice-President: Abdirahman Mahdi
  - Vice-President: Sofia Amini
- Establishment: 11 February 1991
- Website unpo.org

The Unrepresented Nations and Peoples Organization (UNPO) is an international organization established to facilitate the voices of unrepresented and marginalized nations and peoples worldwide. It was formed on 11 February 1991 at the Peace Palace in The Hague, Netherlands. Its members consist of Indigenous peoples, minorities, and unrecognized or occupied territories.

UNPO works to develop the understanding of and respect for the right to self-determination, provides advice and support related to questions of international recognition and political autonomy, trains groups on how to advocate for their causes effectively, and directly advocates for an international response to human rights violations perpetrated against UNPO member groups. Since its foundation in 1991, UNPO’s membership has grown steadily from its original founders, now representing more than 45 peoples worldwide, comprising over 300 million people lacking true representation in domestic or international forums. Over the years, many members have achieved their movement’s goals and gained formal recognition at the national or international level, leading them to leave the organization as their peoples are no longer considered “unrepresented.” Former members who have left the organization after gaining full independence and joining the United Nations (UN) include Armenia, East Timor, Estonia, Latvia, Georgia, and Palau.

Throughout 2024, UNPO conducted several training sessions aimed at helping its members and activists. Sessions included in-person training for Asia Pacific members in Geneva, online cybersecurity training, a cybersecurity training in person for the Baloch community in Stockholm, an in-person training in Brussels on the principles and practical applications of non-violent resistance and a youth study session supported by the Council of Europe, emphasizing the importance of acquiring and improving necessary skills for advocacy within marginalized communities.

== History ==
The UNPO was conceived of by leaders of self-determination movements such as Linnart Mäll of the Congress of Estonia, Erkin Alptekin of East Turkestan, and Lodi Gyari of Tibet, together with Michael van Walt van Praag, along with the international law adviser of the 14th Dalai Lama. The founders were representatives of national movements of Estonia, Latvia, Tibet, Crimean Tatars, Armenia, Georgia, Tatarstan, East Turkestan, East Timor, Australian Aboriginals, the Cordillera in the Philippines, the Greek minority in Albania, Kurdistan, Palau, Taiwan, and West Papua. A key UNPO goal was, and remains, to replicate the powerful message of nonviolence and interethnic tolerance in the face of oppression exhibited by the Tibetan people and championed by the 14th Dalai Lama and to provide a forum in which others are encouraged and supported to adopt similar approaches.

UNPO chose for its founding headquarters in 1991 The Hague in the Netherlands because the city aimed at becoming the International City of Peace and Justice and hosts international courts like the International Court of Justice (ICJ) and International Criminal Court (ICC). A Foundation was established in the Netherlands to provide secretarial support to the UNPO General Assembly and to carry out research and educational activities related to unrepresented peoples worldwide. The Foundation maintains a permanent presence before the European Union, United States and United Nations. It is funded by a combination of member contributions, donations from individuals, and project-based grants from foundations.

== Aims ==
UNPO’s aim is to uphold the fundamental right to autonomy and self-determination for all peoples, striving for a world where every nation and people is heard, valued, and respected. It envisions a future where fundamental rights, including the freedom to determine political status and pursue economic, social, and cultural development, are guaranteed for all.

UNPO facilitates knowledge exchange among unrepresented peoples through its international platform. UNPO supports cross-regional projects and dialogue with international organizations and communities. The organization provides opportunities for unrepresented peoples to participate in international forums and advocate for their interests.

UNPO’s work emphasizes the necessity of non-violent resistance against oppression, while also focusing on the inclusion of underrepresented groups, particularly youth and women, in decision-making processes. By strengthening democratic values, spreading the principles of Gandhian non-violence, and advocating for human rights, the organization empowers members to preserve their cultural identities and contribute to global discussions on pressing environmental and geopolitical challenges. Through strategic partnerships with like-minded organizations, academia, and international actors, UNPO raises awareness of human rights abuses and supports members in having their voices heard on the world stage.

Although UNPO members often have different goals, they have one thing in common: they are generally not represented diplomatically (or only with a minor status, such as observer) in major international institutions, such as the United Nations (UN). As a result, their ability to have their concerns addressed by the global bodies mandated to protect human rights and address conflict is limited.

UNPO is dedicated to the five principles enshrined in its Covenant:

1) The equal right to self-determination: Self-determination is a fundamental human right, allowing peoples to shape their own political, cultural, and social future, ensuring that all voices are heard in decision-making processes.

2) Adherence to the internationally accepted human rights standards as laid down in the Vienna Declaration and Programme of Action and other international instruments: Human rights are universal norms designed to protect all people from political, legal, and social abuses, regardless of ethnicity, nationality, or legal status.

3) Adherence to the principles of democratic pluralism and rejection of totalitarianism and religious intolerance: Democratic pluralism is an inclusive, participatory system where governance is accountable, transparent, and responsive to the people. It embraces diversity, celebrates different cultures, and promotes political inclusion through knowledge, freedom of thought, and openness to differing viewpoints.

4) Promotion of non-violence and the rejection of terrorism as an instrument of policy: Non-violence is the rejection of violent actions to achieve political goals. UNPO encourages members to adopt peaceful resistance and promote inter-ethnic tolerance in response to oppression.

5) Protection of the natural environment: Environmental protection is about preserving habitats and resources that protect cultures. Indigenous and local communities, as guardians of traditional ecological knowledge, are best positioned to safeguard their environment and way of life.

All members are required to sign and abide by the UNPO Covenant. UNPO members are required to be nonviolent.

== Members ==
The following are listed as 44 members by the UNPO.

Original members are listed with pink background and in bold. Members who are recognised as independent countries by at least one UN member or by other countries recognised by at least one UN member are marked by asterisk (*).

Member	Date joined	Represented by	Ref
**Aceh**	11 February 1991	Acheh-Sumatra National Liberation Front	
Annobón	14 May 2024	Ambô Legadu	
Afrikaners	15 May 2008	Freedom Front Plus	
Ahwazi	14 November 2003	Democratic Solidarity Party of al-Ahwaz	
Assyrians	6 August 1991	Assyrian Universal Alliance	
Balochistan	1 March 2008	Balochistan National Party (Mengal)	
Barotseland	23 November 2013	Barotse National Freedom Alliance	
Bellah	6 June 2017	Malian Association for the Preservation of Bellah Culture	
Brittany	8 June 2015	Kelc’h An Dael	
(Catalonia) Catalans	14 December 2018	Assemblea Nacional Catalana	
Chittagong Hill Tracts	6 August 1991	Parbatya Chattagram Jana Samhati Samiti	
**Crimean Tatars**	11 February 1991	Milli Mejlis	
District of Columbia (Washington, DC)	4 December 2015	D.C. Statehood Congressional Delegation	
**East Turkestan**	11 February 1991	World Uyghur Congress	
Gilgit Baltistan	20 September 2008	Gilgit Baltistan Democratic Alliance	
Guam	31 July 2020	Government of Guam	
Haratin	18 September 2011	Initiative de Résurgence du Mouvement Abolitionniste en Mauritanie	
Hmong	2 February 2007	Congress of World Hmong People	
Ijaw	29 October 2025	Ijaw National Congress	
Iranian Kurds	2 February 2007	Democratic Party of Iranian Kurdistan and Komala Party of Iranian Kurdistan	
Kabylia	6 June 2017	MAK-Anavad	
Khmer Krom	15 July 2001	Khmers Kampuchea-Krom Federation	
Nagalim	23 January 1993	National Socialist Council of Nagalim	
Niger Delta	1 June 2023	Niger Delta Peoples Movement	
Ogaden	6 February 2010	Ogaden National Liberation Front	
Ogoni	19 January 1993	Movement for the Survival of the Ogoni People	
Oromo	19 December 2004	Oromo Liberation Front	
Sindhis	19 January 2002	World Sindhi Congress	
Somaliland*	19 December 2004	Government of Somaliland	
(Republic of South Maluku) South Moluccas	6 August 1991	Republic of South Moluccas	
Southern Azerbaijanis	2 February 2007	South Azerbaijan Democratic Party	
Southern Mongolians	2 February 2007	Southern Mongolian Human Rights Information Center	
**Taiwan***	11 February 1991	Taiwan Foundation for Democracy	
**Tibet**	11 February 1991	Central Tibetan Administration	
West Balochistan	26 June 2005	Balochistan People's Party	
Western Togolanders	2017	Homeland Study Group Foundation	
(Republic of West Papua) **West Papuans**	11 February 1991	West Papua Human Rights Center	
Zambesia	31 July 2020	Movement for the Survival of the River Races of Zambesia	

=== Former members ===
Some members of the UNPO have left because of United Nations (UN) recognition, autonomy agreements, or for other reasons.

The following lists former and suspended members.

Former members who became part of the UN are highlighted with a blue background and italics. Original members (from 11 February 1991) are listed with pink background and in bold. Former members who are recognised as independent countries by at least 1 UN member or by other countries recognised by at least 1 UN member are marked by asterisk (*). Suspended members are marked by yellow background.

Former member	Date joined	Date withdrew	Note	Ref
Abkhazians*	6 August 1991	2020	Represented by Ministry of Foreign Affairs of the Republic of Abkhazia	
**Aboriginals of Australia**	11 February 1991	7 July 2012	Represented by National Committee to Defend Black Rights	
Albanians in North Macedonia	16 April 1994	1 March 2008	Reached agreement on wider rights with North Macedonia in 2001	
Amazigh	28 November 2014	26 November 2016	Represented by World Amazigh Congress	
Ambazonia	25 October 2006	7 June 2021	Represented by the Southern Cameroons National Council and Ambazonia Governing Council (from September 2018).	
**Armenia**	11 February 1991	2 March 1992	Became member of the UN in 1992	
Bashkortostan	3 February 1996	30 June 1998		
Bougainville	6 August 1991	1 March 2008	Reached an agreement with Papua New Guinea in 2021 in which Bougainville will be independent by 2027.	
Burma	15 May 2008	13 February 2010	Represented by National Council of the Union of Burma. The Myanmar military junta was dissolved in 2011.	
Buryatia	3 February 1996	13 February 2010	Represented by All-Buryat Association for the Development of Culture	
Cabinda	17 April 1997	18 September 2011	Represented by the Front for the Liberation of the Enclave of Cabinda	
Chechen Republic of Ichkeria*	6 August 1991	10 September 2010	Government-in-exile in London.	
Chin	15 July 2001	26 November 2016	Represented by Chin National Front	
(Chuvashia) Chuvash	17 January 1993	1 March 2008	Represented by the Chuvash National Congress	
Circassia	16 April 1994	6 November 2015	Represented by International Circassian Association	
**Cordillera**	11 February 1991	6 November 2015	Represented by Cordillera Peoples' Alliance	
Degar-Montagnards	14 November 2003	29 April 2016	Represented by Montagnard Foundation, Inc.	
East Timor	17 January 1993	27 September 2002	Became member of the UN in 2002	
**Estonia**	11 February 1991	17 September 1991	Became member of the UN in 1991	
Gagauzia	16 April 1994	1 December 2007	Reached autonomy agreement with Moldova in 1994	
**Georgia**	11 February 1991	31 July 1992	Became member of the UN in 1992	
**Republic of Northern Epirus**	11 February 1991	7 July 2012	Represented by Omonoia	
Hungarian minority in Romania	30 July 1994	2015	Democratic Alliance of Hungarians in Romania	
Ingushetia	30 July 1994	1 March 2008		
Inkeri	17 January 1993	9 October 2009		
(Kurdistan Region) **Iraqi Kurdistan**	11 February 1991	1 July 2015	Represented by Kurdistan Democratic Party of Iraq and the Patriotic Union of Kurdistan	
Iraqi Turkmen	6 August 1991	27 November 2016	Represented by Iraqi Turkmen Front, Turkmen Nationalist Movement, Turkmen Wafa Movement, and Islamic Union of Iraqi Turkmens	
Kalahui Hawaii	3 August 1993	7 July 2012	Represented by Ka Lahui Hawaii	
Karenni State	19 January 1993	7 July 2012	Represented by Karenni National Progressive Party	
Khalistan	24 January 1993	4 August 1993	Membership suspended on 4 August 1993 and suspension made permanent 22 January 1995.	
(Komi Republic) Komi	17 January 1993	9 October 2009		
(Republic of Kosova) Kosovo*	6 August 1991	24 March 2018	Represented by Democratic League of Kosovo	
Kumyk	17 April 1997	1 March 2008		
Lakota Nation	30 July 1994	1 December 2007	Followed by the declaration of the Republic of Lakotah	
Latin American Indigenous Peoples (Project)	2016	?		
**Latvia**	11 February 1991	17 September 1991	Became member of the UN in 1991	
Lezghin	7 July 2012	30 October 2023	Federal Lezgian National and Cultural Autonomy	
(Maasai people) Maasai	19 December 2004	7 July 2012	Represented by Maasai Women for Education and Economic Development	
Maohi	30 July 1994	1 December 2007	Represented by Hiti Tau	
Madhesh	14 October 2017	30 October 2023	Represented by Alliance for Independent Madhesh	
Mapuche	19 January 1993	26 April 2016	Represented by Mapuche Inter-Regional Council	
Mari	6 August 1991	9 October 2009		
Mon	3 February 1996	7 July 2012	Represented by Mon Unity League	
Moro	26 September 2010	28 November 2014	Represented by the Moro Islamic Liberation Front, autonomy and peace deal with the government in 2014	
Nahua Del Alto Balsas	19 December 2004	20 September 2008		
Nuxalk Nation	23 September 1998	1 March 2008		
**Palau (Belau)**	11 February 1991	15 December 1994	Became member of the UN in 1994	
Rusyn	23 September 1998	1 December 2007		
(Sakha Republic) Sakha	3 August 1993	30 June 1998		
(Sandžak) Sanjak	17 January 1993	18 September 2011	Represented by the Bosnian National Council of Sanjak	
Savoy	29 June 2014	30 October 2023		
Scania (Skåneland)	19 January 1993	18 September 2011	Membership suspended on 18 September 2011.	
Rehoboth Basters	2 February 2007	December 2019	Represented by Captains Council	
Shan	17 April 1997	6 February 2010		
South Arabia	29 April 2016		Represented by the Southern Democratic Assembly for Self-Determination for South Arabia's People	
Sulu	5 January 2015	30 October 2023	Sulu Foundation of Nine Ethnic Tribes	
Talysh	15 July 2014		National Talysh Movement	
**Tatarstan**	11 February 1991	1 March 2008		
Trieste (Free Territory of Trieste)	28 December 2014		Represented by TRIEST NGO	
Tsimshian	2 February 2007	18 September 2011		
Tuva	3 February 1996	13 February 2010		
(Udmurtia) Udmurt	17 January 1993	6 July 2013	Represented by Udmurt Council	
Vhavenda	14 November 2003	1 July 2015	Represented by Dabalorivhuwa Patriotic Front	
Zanzibar	6 August 1991	1 July 2015	Represented by Zanzibar Democratic Alternative, in cooperation with the Civic United Front	

=== Suspensions ===
UNPO's representing nations may become suspended from the Organization if they fail to follow its covenant.

In 24 January 1993, Khalistan was briefly admitted in the Unrepresented Nations and Peoples Organization, but was suspended a few months after its admission. The membership suspension was made permanent on 22 January 1995, as there was no mechanism to expel Khalistan or force it to withdraw.

Scania was also suspended on 18 September 2011.

== Leadership ==
=== Secretaries-general ===
According to World Statesmen.org:

Name	Term
Michael van Walt van Praag (Netherlands)	1991–1998
Tsering Jampa (Tibet)	1997–1998
Helen S. Corbett (Australian Aboriginals)	1998–1999
(East Turkestan) Erkin Alptekin (Uyghurs)	1999–2003
Marino Busdachin (Italy)	2003–2018
(United States) Ralph J. Bunche III (USA)	2018–2023
Mercè Monje Cano (Spain)	2023–2026

=== Chairmen/Presidents of the General Assembly ===
According to World Statesmen.org:

- Linnart Mäll – (Estonia) 1991–1993
- Erkin Alptekin – (Uyghurs) 1993–1997
- Seif Sharif Hamad – (Zanzibar) 1997–2001
- John J. Nimrod – (Assyrians) 2001–2005
- Göran Hansson – (Scania) 2005–2006
- Ledum Mitee – (Ogoni) 2006–2010
- Ngawang Choephel Drakmargyapon – (Tibet) 2010–2015
- Nasser Boladai – (West Balochistan) 2015–2022
- Edna Adan Ismail - (Somaliland) 2022–2024
- Rubina Greenwood - (Sindh) 2024–current

=== Executive Directors ===
According to World Statesmen.org:

- Karl von Habsburg – (Austria) 19 January 2002 – 31 December 2002
- Mercè Monje Cano – (Catalonia) 1 October 2021 – 21 April 2023 (concurrently acting General Secretary from January to 21 April 2023)

== See also ==
- European Free Alliance
- Federal Union of European Nationalities
- Free Nations of Post-Russia Forum
- High-Level Week of the 80th Session of the United Nations General Assembly 2025
- League for Small and Subject Nationalities
- List of active national liberation movements recognized by intergovernmental organizations
- Micronation
- Stateless nation
- United Nations list of non-self-governing territories
- Universal Declaration of the Rights of Peoples
