= West Papua Human Rights Center =

US-based human rights organisation

WP Human Rights Center
- Washington, D.C. United States

Information
- Founded: December 2018
- Website: wphumanrightscenter.org

The West Papuan Human Rights Center is a United States-based human rights organisation. It was organized in late 2018 and launched in 2019 by the West Papuan representative to the United Nations and the US Congress, Herman Wainggai.

== History ==
On December 14, 2018, the first meeting was held and the idea of establishing a Human Rights Center to document human rights abuse cases in West Papua came up. The idea was implemented one year later and was formally recognized by the United States government with the approval of the center as an official NGO on March 25, 2019.

== Objective ==
The main objective of the Center is to help educate the world about the Human Rights issues in West Papua by highlighting the issues facing the West Papuan indigenous people and the Indonesian government.

== Mission ==
Indonesia formally occupied West Papua in 1969. The Indonesian government established military bases and police posts in major cities and towns in West Papua. A report published in July 2017 by Human Rights Papua stated that indigenous women were likely to suffer racial discrimination and physical abuse as a result of the occupation.

The main objective of the Center is the collection and documentation of human rights abuses. Names and information associated with victims are recorded and maintained by the WPHRC.

Inaction on the part of the US government has led scholars and critics to call for changes in US approach. Only with the US government's participation, the center believes, will changes be favorable to both sides.

The Center documents human rights violations in three categories: human rights, religious rights and environmental rights.

== See also ==
- United Liberation Movement for West Papua
- Act of Free Choice
- Dr. Thom Wainggai
- Benny Wenda
- Jacob Rumbiak
