= Merafong City Local Municipality elections =

Local elections in Gauteng, South Africa

The Merafong City Local Municipality council consists of forty-nine members elected by mixed-member proportional representation. Twenty-five councillors are elected by first-past-the-post voting in twenty-fivet wards, while the remaining twenty-four are chosen from party lists so that the total number of party representatives is proportional to the number of votes received.

In the election of 4 November 2026 no party won a majority. The African National Congress (ANC) won the most seats.

== Results ==
The following table shows the composition of the council after past elections.

| Event | AIC | ANC | DA | EFF | FF+ | IFP | UDM | Other | Total |
|---|---|---|---|---|---|---|---|---|---|
| 2000 election | — | 37 | 9 | — | 1 | 2 | 1 | 0 | 51 |
| 2006 election | — | 33 | 12 | — | 3 | 2 | 1 | 0 | 51 |
| 2011 election | — | 41 | 11 | — | 0 | 1 | 1 | 2 | 56 |
| 2016 election | 1 | 30 | 12 | 9 | 1 | 1 | 1 | 0 | 55 |
| 2021 election | 1 | 27 | 9 | 9 | 4 | 1 | 1 | 3 | 55 |
| 2026 election | 1 | 17 | 11 | 4 | 2 | 1 | — | 13 | 49 |

== December 2000 election ==
The following table shows the results of the 2000 election.

| Party | Ward | | | List | | | Total seats |
| Party | Votes | % | Seats | Votes | % | Seats | Total seats |
|---|---|---|---|---|---|---|---|
| African National Congress | 29,288 | 72.66 | 21 | 29,496 | 73.00 | 16 | 37 |
| Democratic Alliance | 7,133 | 17.70 | 5 | 7,150 | 17.70 | 4 | 9 |
| United Democratic Movement | 1,293 | 3.21 | 0 | 1,305 | 3.23 | 2 | 2 |
| Inkatha Freedom Party | 1,078 | 2.67 | 0 | 1,026 | 2.54 | 1 | 1 |
| Pan Africanist Congress of Azania | 505 | 1.25 | 0 | 549 | 1.36 | 1 | 1 |
| Freedom Front Plus | 461 | 1.14 | 0 | 462 | 1.14 | 1 | 1 |
| United Christian Democratic Party | 129 | 0.32 | 0 | 246 | 0.61 | 0 | 0 |
| Independent Civic Organisation of South Africa | 129 | 0.32 | 0 | 171 | 0.42 | 0 | 0 |
| Independent candidates | 292 | 0.72 | 0 | | | | 0 |
| Total | 40,308 | 100.00 | 26 | 40,405 | 100.00 | 25 | 51 |
| Valid votes | 40,308 | 97.60 | | 40,405 | 97.87 | | |
| Invalid/blank votes | 991 | 2.40 | | 880 | 2.13 | | |
| Total votes | 41,299 | 100.00 | | 41,285 | 100.00 | | |
| Registered voters/turnout | 83,998 | 49.17 | | 83,998 | 49.15 | | |

== March 2006 election ==
The following table shows the results of the 2006 election.

| Party | Ward | | | List | | | Total seats |
| Party | Votes | % | Seats | Votes | % | Seats | Total seats |
|---|---|---|---|---|---|---|---|
| African National Congress | 14,430 | 65.42 | 21 | 14,298 | 65.05 | 12 | 33 |
| Democratic Alliance | 4,891 | 22.18 | 5 | 4,948 | 22.51 | 7 | 12 |
| Freedom Front Plus | 1,081 | 4.90 | 0 | 1,017 | 4.63 | 3 | 3 |
| Inkatha Freedom Party | 828 | 3.75 | 0 | 832 | 3.79 | 2 | 2 |
| United Democratic Movement | 566 | 2.57 | 0 | 582 | 2.65 | 1 | 1 |
| Independent Democrats | 144 | 0.65 | 0 | 121 | 0.55 | 0 | 0 |
| Pan Africanist Congress of Azania | 52 | 0.24 | 0 | 130 | 0.59 | 0 | 0 |
| Azanian People's Organisation | 64 | 0.29 | 0 | 52 | 0.24 | 0 | 0 |
| Independent candidates | 0 | 0.00 | 0 | | | | 0 |
| Total | 22,056 | 100.00 | 26 | 21,980 | 100.00 | 25 | 51 |
| Valid votes | 22,056 | 98.28 | | 21,980 | 98.05 | | |
| Invalid/blank votes | 385 | 1.72 | | 436 | 1.95 | | |
| Total votes | 22,441 | 100.00 | | 22,416 | 100.00 | | |
| Registered voters/turnout | 89,026 | 25.21 | | 89,026 | 25.18 | | |

== May 2011 election ==
The following table shows the results of the 2011 election.

| Party | Ward | | | List | | | Total seats |
| Party | Votes | % | Seats | Votes | % | Seats | Total seats |
|---|---|---|---|---|---|---|---|
| African National Congress | 37,741 | 73.77 | 25 | 38,177 | 74.31 | 16 | 41 |
| Democratic Alliance | 10,126 | 19.79 | 3 | 10,081 | 19.62 | 8 | 11 |
| Inkatha Freedom Party | 848 | 1.66 | 0 | 763 | 1.49 | 1 | 1 |
| Merafong Civic Association | 619 | 1.21 | 0 | 570 | 1.11 | 1 | 1 |
| Congress of the People | 609 | 1.19 | 0 | 554 | 1.08 | 1 | 1 |
| United Democratic Movement | 497 | 0.97 | 0 | 426 | 0.83 | 1 | 1 |
| Freedom Front Plus | 377 | 0.74 | 0 | 313 | 0.61 | 0 | 0 |
| Independent Ratepayers Association of SA | 236 | 0.46 | 0 | 166 | 0.32 | 0 | 0 |
| African People's Convention | 36 | 0.07 | 0 | 187 | 0.36 | 0 | 0 |
| National Freedom Party | 33 | 0.06 | 0 | 139 | 0.27 | 0 | 0 |
| Independent candidates | 40 | 0.08 | 0 | | | | 0 |
| Total | 51,162 | 100.00 | 28 | 51,376 | 100.00 | 28 | 56 |
| Valid votes | 51,162 | 97.90 | | 51,376 | 98.41 | | |
| Invalid/blank votes | 1,096 | 2.10 | | 829 | 1.59 | | |
| Total votes | 52,258 | 100.00 | | 52,205 | 100.00 | | |
| Registered voters/turnout | 94,546 | 55.27 | | 94,546 | 55.22 | | |

== August 2016 election ==
The following table shows the results of the 2016 election.

| Party | Ward | | | List | | | Total seats |
| Party | Votes | % | Seats | Votes | % | Seats | Total seats |
|---|---|---|---|---|---|---|---|
| African National Congress | 28,909 | 54.73 | 23 | 28,022 | 53.18 | 7 | 30 |
| Democratic Alliance | 11,488 | 21.75 | 5 | 11,425 | 21.68 | 7 | 12 |
| Economic Freedom Fighters | 8,564 | 16.21 | 0 | 8,509 | 16.15 | 9 | 9 |
| African Independent Congress | 600 | 1.14 | 0 | 1,653 | 3.14 | 1 | 1 |
| Freedom Front Plus | 1,053 | 1.99 | 0 | 1,072 | 2.03 | 1 | 1 |
| Inkatha Freedom Party | 726 | 1.37 | 0 | 711 | 1.35 | 1 | 1 |
| United Democratic Movement | 724 | 1.37 | 0 | 690 | 1.31 | 1 | 1 |
| Independent candidates | 341 | 0.65 | 0 | | | | 0 |
| Merafong Civic Association | 124 | 0.23 | 0 | 203 | 0.39 | 0 | 0 |
| Congress of the People | 111 | 0.21 | 0 | 126 | 0.24 | 0 | 0 |
| Independent Ratepayers Association of SA | 76 | 0.14 | 0 | 72 | 0.14 | 0 | 0 |
| Azanian People's Organisation | 64 | 0.12 | 0 | 74 | 0.14 | 0 | 0 |
| African Christian Democratic Party | 8 | 0.02 | 0 | 71 | 0.13 | 0 | 0 |
| Patriotic Alliance | 17 | 0.03 | 0 | 33 | 0.06 | 0 | 0 |
| International Revelation Congress | 12 | 0.02 | 0 | 31 | 0.06 | 0 | 0 |
| Total | 52,817 | 100.00 | 28 | 52,692 | 100.00 | 27 | 55 |
| Valid votes | 52,817 | 98.49 | | 52,692 | 98.17 | | |
| Invalid/blank votes | 812 | 1.51 | | 984 | 1.83 | | |
| Total votes | 53,629 | 100.00 | | 53,676 | 100.00 | | |
| Registered voters/turnout | 99,964 | 53.65 | | 99,964 | 53.70 | | |

== November 2021 election ==
The following table shows the results of the 2021 election.

| Party | Ward | | | List | | | Total seats |
| Party | Votes | % | Seats | Votes | % | Seats | Total seats |
|---|---|---|---|---|---|---|---|
| African National Congress | 18,863 | 48.26 | 21 | 19,316 | 49.68 | 6 | 27 |
| Democratic Alliance | 6,159 | 15.76 | 5 | 6,430 | 16.54 | 4 | 9 |
| Economic Freedom Fighters | 5,584 | 14.29 | 1 | 6,127 | 15.76 | 8 | 9 |
| Freedom Front Plus | 2,671 | 6.83 | 0 | 2,761 | 7.10 | 4 | 4 |
| Merafong Agents of Change | 1,218 | 3.12 | 0 | 1,356 | 3.49 | 2 | 2 |
| Independent candidates | 2,024 | 5.18 | 1 | | | | 1 |
| Inkatha Freedom Party | 625 | 1.60 | 0 | 654 | 1.68 | 1 | 1 |
| African Independent Congress | 443 | 1.13 | 0 | 460 | 1.18 | 1 | 1 |
| United Democratic Movement | 395 | 1.01 | 0 | 402 | 1.03 | 1 | 1 |
| Forum for Service Delivery | 170 | 0.43 | 0 | 227 | 0.58 | 0 | 0 |
| Patriotic Alliance | 182 | 0.47 | 0 | 203 | 0.52 | 0 | 0 |
| African Transformation Movement | 165 | 0.42 | 0 | 192 | 0.49 | 0 | 0 |
| African Christian Democratic Party | 170 | 0.43 | 0 | 181 | 0.47 | 0 | 0 |
| Pan Africanist Congress of Azania | 133 | 0.34 | 0 | 148 | 0.38 | 0 | 0 |
| International Revelation Congress | 135 | 0.35 | 0 | 129 | 0.33 | 0 | 0 |
| Congress of the People | 29 | 0.07 | 0 | 116 | 0.30 | 0 | 0 |
| Justice and Employment Party | 45 | 0.12 | 0 | 65 | 0.17 | 0 | 0 |
| National Freedom Party | 53 | 0.14 | 0 | 57 | 0.15 | 0 | 0 |
| United Christian Democratic Party | 19 | 0.05 | 0 | 59 | 0.15 | 0 | 0 |
| Total | 39,083 | 100.00 | 28 | 38,883 | 100.00 | 27 | 55 |
| Valid votes | 39,083 | 98.06 | | 38,883 | 97.41 | | |
| Invalid/blank votes | 772 | 1.94 | | 1,033 | 2.59 | | |
| Total votes | 39,855 | 100.00 | | 39,916 | 100.00 | | |
| Registered voters/turnout | 94,811 | 42.04 | | 94,811 | 42.10 | | |

=== By-elections from November 2021 ===
The following by-elections were held to fill vacant ward seats in the period from November 2021.

| Date | Ward | Party of the previous councillor | Party of the newly elected councillor |
|---|---|---|---|
| 30 Nov 2022 | 4 | Independent candidate | African National Congress |
| 5 Apr 2023 | 16 | Democratic Alliance | Democratic Alliance |
| 26 Nov 2025 | 10 | African National Congress | African National Congress |

After the murder of ward 4's independent councillor, Thabo Malatjie, in Lesotho, a by-election was held on 30 November. The ANC regained the seat, winning 62% of the vote.

== November 2026 election ==
The following table shows the results of the 2026 election.

| Party | Ward | | | List | | | Total seats |
| Party | Votes | % | Seats | Votes | % | Seats | Total seats |
|---|---|---|---|---|---|---|---|
| African National Congress | 16,138 | 33.53 | 17 | 16,525 | 34.32 | 0 | 17 |
| Democratic Alliance | 11,056 | 22.97 | 7 | 11,100 | 23.06 | 4 | 11 |
| Economic Freedom Fighters | 4,225 | 8.78 | 0 | 4,190 | 8.70 | 4 | 4 |
| One Merafong Organisation | 4,111 | 8.54 | 1 | 4,019 | 8.35 | 3 | 4 |
| uMkhonto weSizwe Party | 2,421 | 5.03 | 0 | 2,509 | 5.21 | 3 | 3 |
| Freedom Front Plus | 2,113 | 4.39 | 0 | 2,159 | 4.48 | 2 | 2 |
| ActionSA | 1,669 | 3.47 | 0 | 1,797 | 3.73 | 2 | 2 |
| South African Communist Party | 1,389 | 2.89 | 0 | 1,250 | 2.60 | 1 | 1 |
| Labour Party of South Africa | 1,310 | 2.72 | 0 | 1,317 | 2.74 | 1 | 1 |
| Inkatha Freedom Party | 634 | 1.32 | 0 | 616 | 1.28 | 1 | 1 |
| African Independent Congress | 647 | 1.34 | 0 | 392 | 0.81 | 1 | 1 |
| Patriotic Alliance | 438 | 0.91 | 0 | 421 | 0.87 | 1 | 1 |
| Pan Africanist Congress of Azania | 290 | 0.60 | 0 | 540 | 1.12 | 1 | 1 |
| Independent candidates | 690 | 1.43 | 0 | | | | 0 |
| Merafong Agents of Change | 263 | 0.55 | 0 | 393 | 0.82 | 0 | 0 |
| African Christian Democratic Party | 210 | 0.44 | 0 | 214 | 0.44 | 0 | 0 |
| African Transformation Movement | 107 | 0.22 | 0 | 224 | 0.47 | 0 | 0 |
| Afrika Mayibuye Movement | 118 | 0.25 | 0 | 113 | 0.23 | 0 | 0 |
| True Reformation Party | 68 | 0.14 | 0 | 105 | 0.22 | 0 | 0 |
| United Africans Transformation | 30 | 0.06 | 0 | 126 | 0.26 | 0 | 0 |
| Build One South Africa | 51 | 0.11 | 0 | 61 | 0.13 | 0 | 0 |
| Azanian Ground Forces | 50 | 0.10 | 0 | 46 | 0.10 | 0 | 0 |
| Freedom in South Africa | 41 | 0.09 | 0 | 27 | 0.06 | 0 | 0 |
| Economic Liberators Forum South Africa | 62 | 0.13 | 0 | | | | 0 |
| Total | 48,131 | 100.00 | 25 | 48,144 | 100.00 | 24 | 49 |
| Valid votes | 48,131 | 97.38 | | 48,144 | 97.07 | | |
| Invalid/blank votes | 1,296 | 2.62 | | 1,455 | 2.93 | | |
| Total votes | 49,427 | 100.00 | | 49,599 | 100.00 | | |
| Registered voters/turnout | 98,869 | 49.99 | | 98,869 | 50.17 | | |
