= Greater Letaba Local Municipality elections =

The Greater Letaba Local Municipality is a Local Municipality in Limpopo, South Africa. The council consists of forty-seven members elected by mixed-member proportional representation. Thirty-four councillors are elected by first-past-the-post voting in thirty-four wards, while the remaining thirty-three are chosen from party lists so that the total number of party representatives is proportional to the number of votes received. In the election of 1 November 2021 the African National Congress (ANC) won a majority of 47 seats.

== Results ==
The following table shows the composition of the council after past elections.

== December 2000 election ==
The following table shows the results of the 2000 election.

Party	Ward			List			Total seats
Party	Votes	%	Seats	Votes	%	Seats	Total seats
African National Congress	25,415	87.31	23	30,545	89.42	18	41
African Christian Democratic Party	1,603	5.51	0	1,551	4.54	2	2
Democratic Alliance	1,138	3.91	0	1,499	4.39	2	2
Ximoko Party	291	1.00	0	565	1.65	1	1
Independent candidates	662	2.27	0				0
Total	29,109	100.00	23	34,160	100.00	23	46
Valid votes	29,109	98.51		34,160	98.59		
Invalid/blank votes	441	1.49		489	1.41		
Total votes	29,550	100.00		34,649	100.00		
Registered voters/turnout	75,196	39.30		75,196	46.08		

== March 2006 election ==
The following table shows the results of the 2006 election.

Party	Ward			List			Total seats
Party	Votes	%	Seats	Votes	%	Seats	Total seats
African National Congress	38,962	90.09	26	38,728	89.59	21	47
African Christian Democratic Party	1,879	4.34	0	1,679	3.88	2	2
Democratic Alliance	1,184	2.74	0	1,429	3.31	2	2
Independent candidates	708	1.64	0				0
Ximoko Party	263	0.61	0	436	1.01	1	1
United Democratic Movement	49	0.11	0	623	1.44	0	0
Alliance for Democracy and Prosperity	203	0.47	0	332	0.77	0	0
Total	43,248	100.00	26	43,227	100.00	26	52
Valid votes	43,248	98.61		43,227	98.58		
Invalid/blank votes	610	1.39		622	1.42		
Total votes	43,858	100.00		43,849	100.00		
Registered voters/turnout	89,929	48.77		89,929	48.76		

== May 2011 election ==
The following table shows the results of the 2011 election.

Party	Ward			List			Total seats
Party	Votes	%	Seats	Votes	%	Seats	Total seats
African National Congress	46,472	86.52	29	47,427	88.19	22	51
Congress of the People	4,030	7.50	0	4,022	7.48	4	4
Democratic Alliance	1,103	2.05	0	1,106	2.06	1	1
Independent candidates	1,178	2.19	0				0
African Christian Democratic Party	285	0.53	0	416	0.77	1	1
United Christian Democratic Party	254	0.47	0	179	0.33	0	0
United Democratic Movement	219	0.41	0	210	0.39	0	0
African People's Convention	72	0.13	0	303	0.56	0	0
Ximoko Party	100	0.19	0	117	0.22	0	0
Total	53,713	100.00	29	53,780	100.00	28	57
Valid votes	53,713	98.79		53,780	98.97		
Invalid/blank votes	656	1.21		559	1.03		
Total votes	54,369	100.00		54,339	100.00		
Registered voters/turnout	100,539	54.08		100,539	54.05		

== August 2016 election ==
The following table shows the results of the 2016 election.

Party	Ward			List			Total seats
Party	Votes	%	Seats	Votes	%	Seats	Total seats
African National Congress	42,671	75.20	30	43,064	75.98	16	46
Economic Freedom Fighters	8,680	15.30	0	8,860	15.63	9	9
Congress of the People	1,545	2.72	0	1,710	3.02	2	2
Democratic Alliance	1,561	2.75	0	1,590	2.81	2	2
Limpopo Residents Association	634	1.12	0	606	1.07	1	1
Independent candidates	913	1.61	0				0
African Christian Democratic Party	212	0.37	0	236	0.42	0	0
United Democratic Movement	158	0.28	0	187	0.33	0	0
Ximoko Party	142	0.25	0	157	0.28	0	0
Freedom Front Plus	139	0.24	0	153	0.27	0	0
Pan Africanist Congress of Azania	86	0.15	0	114	0.20	0	0
Total	56,741	100.00	30	56,677	100.00	30	60
Valid votes	56,741	98.85		56,677	98.62		
Invalid/blank votes	662	1.15		791	1.38		
Total votes	57,403	100.00		57,468	100.00		
Registered voters/turnout	111,093	51.67		111,093	51.73		

== November 2021 election ==
The following table shows the results of the 2021 election.

Party	Ward			List			Total seats
Party	Votes	%	Seats	Votes	%	Seats	Total seats
African National Congress	42,156	76.43	30	43,114	78.49	17	47
Economic Freedom Fighters	6,515	11.81	0	6,938	12.63	8	8
Congress of the People	1,585	2.87	0	1,719	3.13	2	2
Independent candidates	2,077	3.77	0				0
Democratic Alliance	809	1.47	0	845	1.54	1	1
Mopani Independent Movement	728	1.32	0	717	1.31	1	1
Limpopo Residents Association	445	0.81	0	451	0.82	1	1
Able Leadership	153	0.28	0	318	0.58	0	0
African Christian Democratic Party	198	0.36	0	214	0.39	0	0
Freedom Front Plus	168	0.30	0	179	0.33	0	0
African People's Convention	178	0.32	0	97	0.18	0	0
United Democratic Movement	80	0.15	0	97	0.18	0	0
Ximoko Party	22	0.04	0	105	0.19	0	0
Abantu Batho Congress	36	0.07	0	70	0.13	0	0
African Transformation Movement	6	0.01	0	67	0.12	0	0
Total	55,156	100.00	30	54,931	100.00	30	60
Valid votes	55,156	98.68		54,931	98.61		
Invalid/blank votes	738	1.32		774	1.39		
Total votes	55,894	100.00		55,705	100.00		
Registered voters/turnout	110,164	50.74		110,164	50.57		
