= Ba-Phalaborwa Local Municipality elections =

The Ba-Phalaborwa Local Municipality is a Local Municipality in Limpopo, South Africa. The council consists of thirty-seven members elected by mixed-member proportional representation. Nineteen councillors are elected by first-past-the-post voting in nineteen wards, while the remaining eighteen are chosen from party lists so that the total number of party representatives is proportional to the number of votes received. In the election of 1 November 2021 the African National Congress (ANC) won a majority of 24 seats.

== Results ==
The following table shows the composition of the council after past elections.

Event	ANC	COPE	DA	EFF	Other	Total
2006 election	26	—	3	—	3	32
2011 election	29	2	4	—	1	36
2016 election	26	1	4	6	0	37
2021 election	24	0	4	5	4	37

== March 2006 election ==
The following table shows the results of the 2006 election.

Party	Ward			List			Total seats
Party	Votes	%	Seats	Votes	%	Seats	Total seats
African National Congress	15,049	75.20	15	16,089	81.16	11	26
Democratic Alliance	1,732	8.66	1	1,833	9.25	2	3
Independent candidates	1,689	8.44	0				0
African Christian Democratic Party	462	2.31	0	542	2.73	1	1
Pan Africanist Congress of Azania	438	2.19	0	343	1.73	1	1
United Democratic Movement	261	1.30	0	386	1.95	1	1
Freedom Front Plus	192	0.96	0	239	1.21	0	0
Independent Democrats	92	0.46	0	194	0.98	0	0
Ximoko Party	83	0.41	0	197	0.99	0	0
Alliance for Democracy and Prosperity	13	0.06	0				0
Total	20,011	100.00	16	19,823	100.00	16	32
Valid votes	20,011	98.14		19,823	97.58		
Invalid/blank votes	380	1.86		491	2.42		
Total votes	20,391	100.00		20,314	100.00		
Registered voters/turnout	53,474	38.13		53,474	37.99		

== May 2011 election ==
The following table shows the results of the 2011 election.

Party	Ward			List			Total seats
Party	Votes	%	Seats	Votes	%	Seats	Total seats
African National Congress	24,612	76.81	16	25,772	80.43	13	29
Democratic Alliance	2,991	9.33	2	3,186	9.94	2	4
Congress of the People	1,433	4.47	0	1,354	4.23	2	2
Independent Ratepayers Association of SA	982	3.06	0	796	2.48	1	1
Independent candidates	1,050	3.28	0				0
United Democratic Movement	432	1.35	0	374	1.17	0	0
African Christian Democratic Party	388	1.21	0	330	1.03	0	0
Pan Africanist Congress of Azania	115	0.36	0	78	0.24	0	0
Azanian People's Organisation	37	0.12	0	87	0.27	0	0
Ximoko Party	4	0.01	0	64	0.20	0	0
Total	32,044	100.00	18	32,041	100.00	18	36
Valid votes	32,044	98.16		32,041	98.41		
Invalid/blank votes	600	1.84		518	1.59		
Total votes	32,644	100.00		32,559	100.00		
Registered voters/turnout	61,477	53.10		61,477	52.96		

== August 2016 election ==
The following table shows the results of the 2016 election.

Party	Ward			List			Total seats
Party	Votes	%	Seats	Votes	%	Seats	Total seats
African National Congress	23,710	66.69	17	24,414	68.60	9	26
Economic Freedom Fighters	5,433	15.28	0	5,453	15.32	6	6
Democratic Alliance	3,684	10.36	2	4,183	11.75	2	4
Independent candidates	1,143	3.22	0				0
Congress of the People	410	1.15	0	378	1.06	1	1
Independent Ratepayers Association of SA	408	1.15	0	298	0.84	0	0
African People's Convention	212	0.60	0	287	0.81	0	0
United Democratic Movement	247	0.69	0	218	0.61	0	0
African Christian Democratic Party	148	0.42	0	169	0.47	0	0
Pan Africanist Congress of Azania	64	0.18	0	55	0.15	0	0
African Freedom Salvation	44	0.12	0	56	0.16	0	0
United People of South Africa	40	0.11	0	32	0.09	0	0
Agang South Africa	9	0.03	0	18	0.05	0	0
Ximoko Party				26	0.07	0	0
Total	35,552	100.00	19	35,587	100.00	18	37
Valid votes	35,552	98.54		35,587	98.48		
Invalid/blank votes	528	1.46		548	1.52		
Total votes	36,080	100.00		36,135	100.00		
Registered voters/turnout	70,416	51.24		70,416	51.32		

== November 2021 election ==
The following table shows the results of the 2021 election.

Party	Ward			List			Total seats
Party	Votes	%	Seats	Votes	%	Seats	Total seats
African National Congress	18,906	59.45	17	19,777	62.86	7	24
Economic Freedom Fighters	3,893	12.24	0	4,353	13.84	5	5
Democratic Alliance	3,069	9.65	2	3,157	10.03	2	4
National Independent Party	1,491	4.69	0	1,513	4.81	2	2
Mopani Independent Movement	978	3.08	0	1,036	3.29	1	1
Independent candidates	2,003	6.30	0				0
Freedom Front Plus	308	0.97	0	359	1.14	1	1
Able Leadership	226	0.71	0	224	0.71	0	0
African Christian Democratic Party	190	0.60	0	222	0.71	0	0
Congress of the People	163	0.51	0	144	0.46	0	0
Forum for Service Delivery	139	0.44	0	105	0.33	0	0
African People's Convention	121	0.38	0	112	0.36	0	0
Civic Warriors	98	0.31	0	74	0.24	0	0
United Democratic Movement	69	0.22	0	100	0.32	0	0
Abantu Batho Congress	85	0.27	0	80	0.25	0	0
Ximoko Party	36	0.11	0	57	0.18	0	0
Inkatha Freedom Party	4	0.01	0	55	0.17	0	0
African Transformation Movement	11	0.03	0	38	0.12	0	0
Azanian People's Organisation	1	0.00	0	33	0.10	0	0
Patriotic Alliance	10	0.03	0	22	0.07	0	0
Total	31,801	100.00	19	31,461	100.00	18	37
Valid votes	31,801	97.85		31,461	97.60		
Invalid/blank votes	699	2.15		772	2.40		
Total votes	32,500	100.00		32,233	100.00		
Registered voters/turnout	75,415	43.09		75,415	42.74		
