= Rubina Greenwood =

British-Pakistani human rights activist, politician, and architect

Rubina Shaikh Greenwood
- روبينا شيخ گرين ووڊ

President of Unrepresented Nations and Peoples Organization
- Incumbent
- Assumed office 12 May 2024
- Preceded by: Edna Adan Ismail

Personal details
- Born: 15 October 1971 (age 55) Sindh, Pakistan
- Party: World Sindhi Congress
- Education: University of Glasgow

Rubina Shaikh Greenwood(Sindhi: روبينا شيخ گرين ووڊ; born 1971) is a British-Pakistani human rights activist, politician, and architect who has served as the president of the Unrepresented Nations and Peoples Organization since 2024. She is also the president of the World Sindhi Congress.

== Early life and education ==
Greenwood grew up in Sindh, Pakistan in an educated family. She studied engineering at university in Sindh, where she also became involved in activism.

== Career ==
Greenwood was elected president of the Unrepresented Nations and Peoples Organization in 2024; she was re-elected in August 2026.
