= Sindhi Americans =

Americans of Sindhi birth or descent

Sindhi Americans (Sindhi: آمريڪي سنڌي) are Americans or residents of the United States who are of Sindhi descent. They are a subgroup of Indian Americans and Pakistani Americans.

== Demographics ==
Originating from the Sindh region of British India now in modern-day Pakistan, Sindhi Americans belong to either Hindu or Muslim faith. Some belong to the Hindu faith, particularly those who migrated from the Indian Republic. In the 2010 US Census, nearly 7,000 individuals reported Sindhi as their first language. The total population of the Sindhi diaspora in the United States is estimated at over 50,000. The community is spread out over various U.S. cities, with sizable populations on the eastern coast.

US states with significant Sindhi populations, based on the 2000 Census.

== Culture ==
Sindhi festivals such as Cheti Chand are celebrated each year with much fanfare. The American Institute of Sindhulogy (AIS) is a non-profit institute of Sindhology in the U.S., dedicated to researching the history and cultural heritage of Sindh as well as its ancient Indus Valley Civilisation.

== Organizations and politics ==
Sindhi Americans are socially and politically active, having formed numerous community and political-oriented organizations. They maintain interest in domestic American politics, as well as Sindhi politics and the wider politics of Pakistan. The Pakistan Peoples Party has a local chapter in the U.S., in which many Sindhis are involved. The World Sindhi Institute is a human rights organization founded in 1997 and is based in Washington, D.C. The World Sindhi Congress (WSC) has a U.S. chapter which participates in human rights advocacy and the promotion of Sindhi political interests among the diaspora. G. M. Syed Memorial Committee is a group based in Houston, which promotes the ideology of Sindhi nationalist leader G.M. Syed. There are also Congress-focused lobbying groups such as the Sindhi American Political Action Committee (SAPAC), and the Sindh Monitor.

In addition, there are multiple community organizations and associations. The Sindhi Association of North America (SANA) is one of the largest societies of Sindhis residing in North America. Other Sindhi associations include the American British Sindhi Medical Network (ABSMN), and the Alliance of Sindhi Associations of Americas which consists of various state-based associations.

== Notable people ==
=== Indian-origin Sindhi American ===
- Sabeer Bhatia, entrepreneur and founder of Hotmail
- Neeraj Khemlani, journalist
- Raj Kiran Mehtani, Bollywood actor
- Rajesh Mirchandani, television journalist
- Rajeev Motwani, computer scientist
- Ramesh Balwani, former president and COO of Theranos
- Reshma Kewalramani, chief executive officer of Vertex Pharmaceuticals
- Sachal Vasandani, jazz singer
- Sanjay Gupta, neurosurgeon and medical journalist
- Reetika Vazirani, poet and educator
- Umesh Vazirani, computer scientist
- Vijay Vazirani, computer scientist
- Richa Moorjani, actress
- Ashish Vaswani, computer scientist and artificial intelligence researcher, first author of the paper Attention Is All You Need that introduced the Transformer architecture, foundational to modern large language models

=== Pakistan-origin Sindhi American ===
- Ali S. Asani, academic
- Abdul-Majid Bhurgri, computer scientist
- Iqbal Theba, actor
- Kumail Nanjiani, actor and stand-up comedian
- Safdar Sarki, political activist
- Gul Agha, computer scientist
- Somy Ali, actress and activist

== See also ==
- Asian Americans
- Pakistani Americans
  - Baloch Americans
  - Pashtun Americans
  - Punjabi Americans
- Indian Americans
