= Greater Giyani Local Municipality elections =

The Greater Giyani Local Municipality is a local municipality in Limpopo, South Africa. The council consists of sixty-two members elected by mixed-member proportional representation. Thirty-one councillors are elected by first-past-the-post voting in thirty-one wards, while the remaining thirty-one are chosen from party lists so that the total number of party representatives is proportional to the number of votes received. In the election of 1 November 2021 the African National Congress (ANC) won a majority of 47 seats.

== Results ==
The following table shows the composition of the council after past elections.

Event	ACDP	ANC	APC	DA	EFF	NIP	UDM	XP	Other	Total
2000 election	—	41	—	1	—	—	3	5	—	50
2006 election	1	51	—	1	—	—	2	3	2	60
2011 election	1	50	0	2	—	—	1	3	3	60
2016 election	0	51	2	2	5	1	0	1	0	62
2021 election	0	47	2	1	5	1	—	1	5	62

== December 2000 election ==
The following table shows the results of the 2000 election.

Party	Ward			List			Total seats
Party	Votes	%	Seats	Votes	%	Seats	Total seats
African National Congress	32,440	81.94	25	32,393	81.77	16	41
Ximoko Party	4,276	10.80	0	4,145	10.46	5	5
United Democratic Movement	2,682	6.77	0	2,312	5.84	3	3
Democratic Alliance	193	0.49	0	764	1.93	1	1
Total	39,591	100.00	25	39,614	100.00	25	50
Valid votes	39,591	98.45		39,614	98.33		
Invalid/blank votes	625	1.55		673	1.67		
Total votes	40,216	100.00		40,287	100.00		
Registered voters/turnout	83,228	48.32		83,228	48.41		

== March 2006 election ==
The following table shows the results of the 2006 election.

Party	Ward			List			Total seats
Party	Votes	%	Seats	Votes	%	Seats	Total seats
African National Congress	42,329	85.30	29	43,010	86.55	22	51
Ximoko Party	2,467	4.97	0	2,763	5.56	3	3
United Democratic Movement	1,394	2.81	0	1,393	2.80	2	2
Democratic Alliance	995	2.01	0	931	1.87	1	1
Independent candidates	1,320	2.66	1				1
African Democratic Change	542	1.09	0	625	1.26	1	1
African Christian Democratic Party	381	0.77	0	751	1.51	1	1
Independent Democrats	196	0.39	0	219	0.44	0	0
Total	49,624	100.00	30	49,692	100.00	30	60
Valid votes	49,624	98.36		49,692	98.47		
Invalid/blank votes	825	1.64		770	1.53		
Total votes	50,449	100.00		50,462	100.00		
Registered voters/turnout	103,711	48.64		103,711	48.66		

== May 2011 election ==
The following table shows the results of the 2011 election.

Party	Ward			List			Total seats
Party	Votes	%	Seats	Votes	%	Seats	Total seats
African National Congress	47,462	78.23	27	50,543	83.72	23	50
Independent candidates	7,304	12.04	3				3
Ximoko Party	1,145	1.89	0	4,561	7.56	3	3
Democratic Alliance	1,508	2.49	0	1,853	3.07	2	2
United Democratic Movement	382	0.63	0	1,552	2.57	1	1
Congress of the People	1,650	2.72	0				0
African Christian Democratic Party	675	1.11	0	762	1.26	1	1
African People's Convention	196	0.32	0	529	0.88	0	0
African Democratic Change	326	0.54	0	300	0.50	0	0
National Freedom Party	24	0.04	0	270	0.45	0	0
Total	60,672	100.00	30	60,370	100.00	30	60
Valid votes	60,672	98.62		60,370	97.91		
Invalid/blank votes	849	1.38		1,288	2.09		
Total votes	61,521	100.00		61,658	100.00		
Registered voters/turnout	114,704	53.63		114,704	53.75		

== August 2016 election ==
The following table shows the results of the 2016 election.

Party	Ward			List			Total seats
Party	Votes	%	Seats	Votes	%	Seats	Total seats
African National Congress	54,910	79.86	31	56,327	82.19	20	51
Economic Freedom Fighters	4,752	6.91	0	5,035	7.35	5	5
African People's Convention	1,832	2.66	0	1,983	2.89	2	2
Democratic Alliance	1,838	2.67	0	1,908	2.78	2	2
Independent candidates	2,622	3.81	0				0
National Independent Party	1,287	1.87	0	1,112	1.62	1	1
Ximoko Party	421	0.61	0	1,020	1.49	1	1
African Christian Democratic Party	350	0.51	0	377	0.55	0	0
Congress of the People	300	0.44	0	338	0.49	0	0
African Freedom Salvation	283	0.41	0	259	0.38	0	0
United Democratic Movement	165	0.24	0	174	0.25	0	0
Total	68,760	100.00	31	68,533	100.00	31	62
Valid votes	68,760	98.57		68,533	98.23		
Invalid/blank votes	1,001	1.43		1,236	1.77		
Total votes	69,761	100.00		69,769	100.00		
Registered voters/turnout	126,936	54.96		126,936	54.96		

== November 2021 election ==
The following table shows the results of the 2021 election.

Party	Ward			List			Total seats
Party	Votes	%	Seats	Votes	%	Seats	Total seats
African National Congress	44,400	72.71	29	46,550	76.72	18	47
Economic Freedom Fighters	4,349	7.12	0	4,789	7.89	5	5
Independent candidates	4,713	7.72	2				2
African People's Convention	2,064	3.38	0	1,688	2.78	2	2
Democratic Alliance	1,020	1.67	0	1,142	1.88	1	1
Forum for Service Delivery	730	1.20	0	1,303	2.15	1	1
Mopani Independent Movement	1,206	1.98	0	793	1.31	1	1
Patriotic Alliance	637	1.04	0	624	1.03	1	1
Ximoko Party	212	0.35	0	1,005	1.66	1	1
National Independent Party	408	0.67	0	482	0.79	1	1
African Christian Democratic Party	246	0.40	0	349	0.58	0	0
Gazankulu Liberation Congress	233	0.38	0	320	0.53	0	0
Gaza Movement for Change	224	0.37	0	289	0.48	0	0
African Transformation Movement	132	0.22	0	326	0.54	0	0
Able Leadership	176	0.29	0	188	0.31	0	0
Congress of the People	146	0.24	0	131	0.22	0	0
Pan Africanist Congress of Azania	30	0.05	0	201	0.33	0	0
Inkatha Freedom Party	32	0.05	0	150	0.25	0	0
Gaza Youth Revolution	54	0.09	0	76	0.13	0	0
Kingdom Covenant Democratic Party	5	0.01	0	120	0.20	0	0
Azanian People's Organisation	9	0.01	0	71	0.12	0	0
Abantu Batho Congress	21	0.03	0	54	0.09	0	0
Democratic Artists Party	16	0.03	0	24	0.04	0	0
Total	61,063	100.00	31	60,675	100.00	31	62
Valid votes	61,063	98.23		60,675	97.71		
Invalid/blank votes	1,098	1.77		1,425	2.29		
Total votes	62,161	100.00		62,100	100.00		
Registered voters/turnout	127,782	48.65		127,782	48.60		
