= Declaration of the Rights of the Peoples of Russia =

1917 Soviet document by Lenin and Stalin

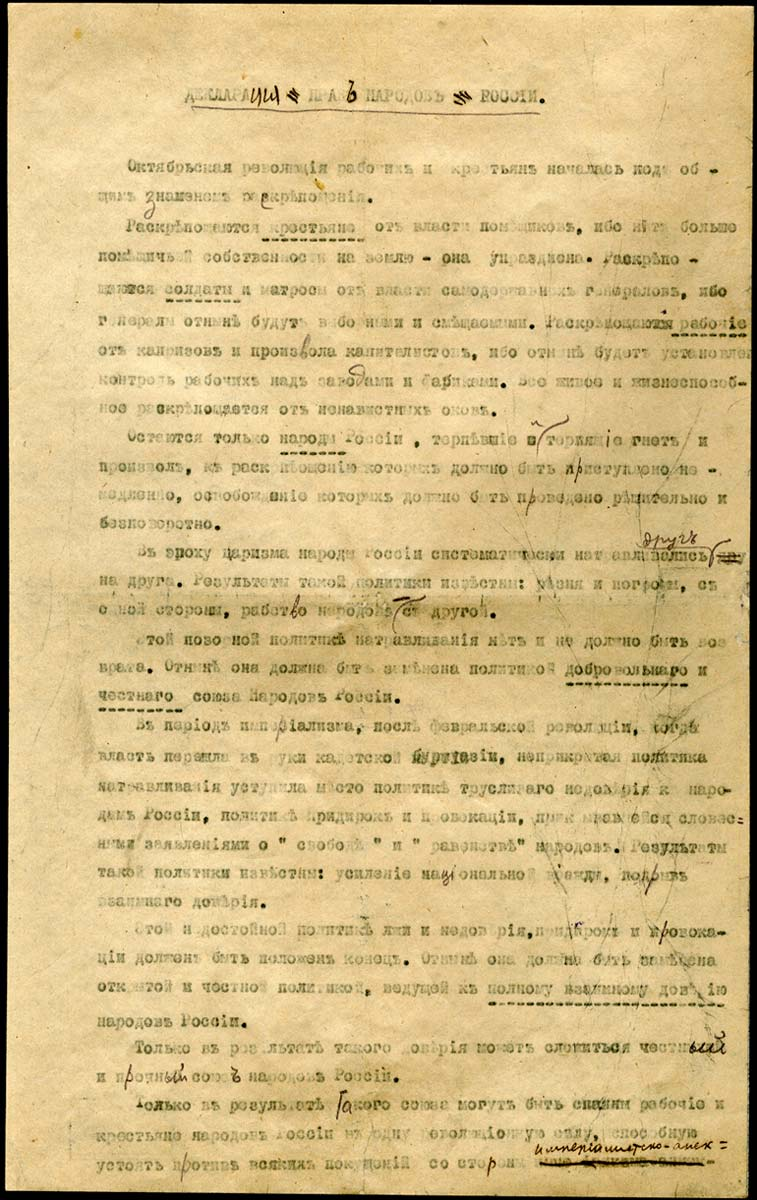
Page 1

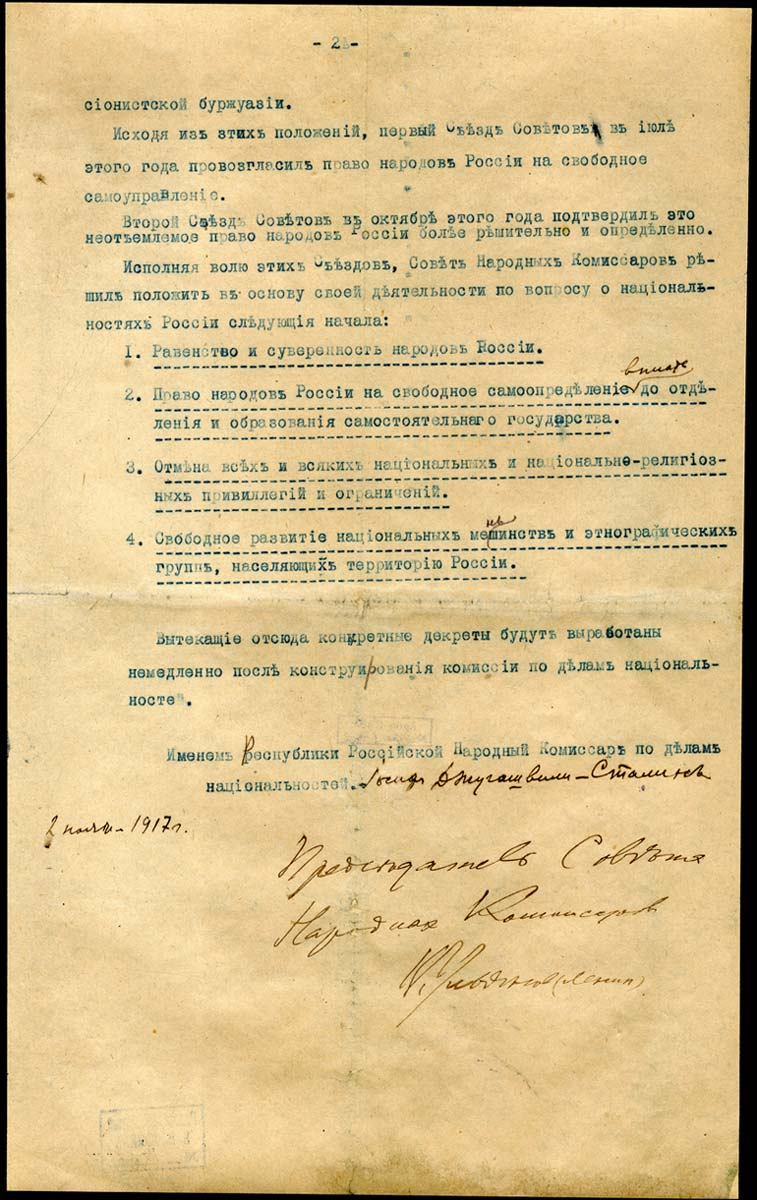
Page 2

The Declaration of the Rights of the Peoples of Russia (Russian: Деклара́ция прав наро́дов Росси́и, romanized: Deklaratsiya prav narodov Rossii) was a document promulgated by the Bolshevik government of Russia on 15 November 1917 (2 November in Julian calendar) and signed by Vladimir Lenin and Joseph Stalin.

== Content ==
The document proclaimed:

1. Equality and sovereignty of peoples of Russia
2. Right of peoples of Russia of a free self-determination, including secession and formation of a separate state
3. Abolition of all national and religious privileges and restrictions
4. Free development of national minorities and ethnographical groups populating the territory of Russia.

The meaning of the Declaration is still disputed in Russian historiography. In 1917 the Bolshevist thinking was largely idealistic, dominated by an ideal of "universal happiness". At this time, many Bolsheviks also believed that the World revolution was imminent and thusly did not give significant care to loss of territories. However, in the Western literature, it is often argued that in fact Lenin and Stalin agreed to capture most of the territories they had no sovereignty over since Russia had lost them to the Central Powers in 1915 and 1916. Many historians suggest that the purpose of the document was to limit the public dissent after Russia lost most of its western areas to the advancing German Empire and try to complicate the matters behind the front lines.

The declaration was an attempt to rally some ethnic non-Russians behind the Bolsheviks. Latvian riflemen were important supporters of Bolsheviks in the early days of Russian Civil War and Latvian historians recognize the promise of sovereignty as an important reason for that. The anti-revolutionary White Russians did not support self-determination and, as a result, few Latvians fought on the side of the White movement. Intended or not, the declaration's provided right to secede was soon exercised by the nations in the western parts of the former Russian Empire, part of which had already been under German army's rather than Moscow's control. After the collapse of the Central Powers in late 1918, however, Soviet Russia began attempting to establish Soviet power in as many states as possible. In November 1918, the Red Army launched a military campaign in the west, invading and occupying Belarus and then advancing against the three Baltic states. In January 1919 the Red Army invaded Ukraine and in July 1920 invaded Poland. In the south, the Red Army invaded the Azerbaijan Democratic Republic in April 1920, then invaded the Republic of Armenia in September, and finally invaded the Democratic Republic of Georgia in early 1921, even though Soviet Russia had nominally agreed to Georgia's independence in the Treaty of Moscow.

The initially successful offensive against the Republic of Estonia ignited the Estonian War of Independence which ended with the Soviet recognition of Estonia. Similarly, the campaigns against the Republic of Latvia and Republic of Lithuania ultimately failed, resulting in the Latvian–Soviet Peace Treaty and Soviet–Lithuanian Peace Treaty respectively. While Ukraine and Belarus were largely conquered, the Soviets ultimately also failed in their invasion of Poland after they were stopped at Warsaw, and hostilities ended with the signing of the Treaty of Riga of 1921. Therefore, in 1920 and 1921, the Soviet Russia recognized all three Baltic States as well as Poland as independent states. Attempts to conquer the Moldavian Democratic Republic holding Bessarabia and Northern Bukovina also failed, and in 1918 Moldavia unified with Romania instead. Years later, following the signing of the Molotov-Ribbentrop Pact and subsequent outbreak of World War II, the Soviet Union would attack many of these territories again, as the Red Army invaded Poland in 1939 and later occupied the Baltic States and Bessarabia and Northern Bukovina in 1940. After the conclusion of World War II, the Soviet Union would keep these territories, with the Baltics and Bessarabia annexed to the USSR and Poland forcibly made into a Soviet satellite state. These conquests made by the Red Army between 1918 and 1945 would last until the dissolution of the USSR beginning in 1989, after which all these nations would come to be independent again.

== List of seceded lands ==
The following countries declared their independence soon after the Bolsheviks' declaration, establishing themselves as non-Communist states. Although the role the declaration played in their independence movements is doubtful, it eased Soviet Russia's recognition of their independence. Except for Finland, all of these areas were outside of Russian sovereignty following the Austro-German successes in the World War I and were officially ceded in the Treaty of Brest-Litovsk.

- Finland (6 December 1917)
- Ukraine (autonomy 22 November 1917, independence 22 January 1918)
- Moldavia (autonomy 15 December 1917, independence 6 February 1918, joined Romania on 9 April 1918)
- Lithuania (16 February 1918)
- Belarus (25 March 1918)
- Estonia (22 April 1918)
- Georgia (26 May 1918)
- Armenia (28 May 1918)
- Azerbaijan (28 May 1918)
- Poland (11 November 1918)
- Latvia (18 November 1918)

Several other independent republics were proclaimed but were short-lived:

- Chuvashia (15 May 1917)
- Bashkurdistan (28 November 1917)
- Central Asia (13 December 1917)
- Crimea (13 December 1917)
- Kuban (16 February 1918)
- Transcaucasia (24 February 1918)
- Kazan (1 March 1918)
- Mountain Republic (11 May 1918)
- Don (18 May 1918)
- Yekaterinburg (19 August 1918)
- Kars (1 December 1918)
- Mughan (15 May 1919)
- East Karelia (21 June 1919)
- North Ingria (9 July 1919)

== Later developments ==
Bolsheviks never formally rejected the idea of self-determination, but Soviet constitutions (of 1924, 1936 and 1977) limited the right of secession to the constituent republics only.

== See also ==
- Universal Declaration of the Rights of Peoples
