= Lephalale Local Municipality elections =

The Lephalale Local Municipality is a Local Municipality in Limpopo, South Africa. The council consists of twenty-nine members elected by mixed-member proportional representation. Twenty-nine councillors are elected by first-past-the-post voting in fifteen wards, while the remaining fourteen are chosen from party lists so that the total number of party representatives is proportional to the number of votes received. In the election of 1 November 2021. The African National Congress (ANC) won a majority of 19 seats on the council.

== Results ==
The following table shows the composition of the council after past elections.

Event	ANC	DA	EFF	Other	Total
2000 election	19	2	—	0	21
2006 election	20	3	—	1	24
2011 election	20	3	—	1	24
2016 election	17	4	5	0	26
2021 election	19	3	3	4	29

== December 2000 election ==
The following table shows the results of the 2000 election.

Party	Ward			List			Total seats
Party	Votes	%	Seats	Votes	%	Seats	Total seats
African National Congress	14,565	84.70	10	14,679	85.28	9	19
Democratic Alliance	1,471	8.55	1	1,938	11.26	1	2
Independent candidates	1,159	6.74	0				0
Alliansie Noord				595	3.46	0	0
Total	17,195	100.00	11	17,212	100.00	10	21
Valid votes	17,195	97.83		17,212	97.86		
Invalid/blank votes	382	2.17		377	2.14		
Total votes	17,577	100.00		17,589	100.00		
Registered voters/turnout	34,749	50.58		34,749	50.62		

== March 2006 election ==
The following table shows the results of the 2006 election.

Party	Ward			List			Total seats
Party	Votes	%	Seats	Votes	%	Seats	Total seats
African National Congress	15,714	83.53	11	15,771	83.97	9	20
Democratic Alliance	2,238	11.90	1	2,100	11.18	2	3
Pan Africanist Congress of Azania	626	3.33	0	570	3.03	1	1
Freedom Front Plus	234	1.24	0	341	1.82	0	0
Total	18,812	100.00	12	18,782	100.00	12	24
Valid votes	18,812	98.30		18,782	98.30		
Invalid/blank votes	325	1.70		325	1.70		
Total votes	19,137	100.00		19,107	100.00		
Registered voters/turnout	40,225	47.57		40,225	47.50		

== May 2011 election ==
The following table shows the results of the 2011 election.

Party	Ward			List			Total seats
Party	Votes	%	Seats	Votes	%	Seats	Total seats
African National Congress	18,156	81.81	11	18,399	82.61	9	20
Democratic Alliance	2,854	12.86	1	2,781	12.49	2	3
Congress of the People	830	3.74	0	774	3.48	1	1
Pan Africanist Congress of Azania	156	0.70	0	121	0.54	0	0
African People's Convention	106	0.48	0	156	0.70	0	0
United Democratic Movement	92	0.41	0	42	0.19	0	0
Total	22,194	100.00	12	22,273	100.00	12	24
Valid votes	22,194	98.61		22,273	98.95		
Invalid/blank votes	312	1.39		237	1.05		
Total votes	22,506	100.00		22,510	100.00		
Registered voters/turnout	43,023	52.31		43,023	52.32		

== August 2016 election ==
The following table shows the results of the 2016 election.

Party	Ward			List			Total seats
Party	Votes	%	Seats	Votes	%	Seats	Total seats
African National Congress	18,389	64.80	10	18,267	64.31	7	17
Economic Freedom Fighters	5,522	19.46	0	5,654	19.91	5	5
Democratic Alliance	3,801	13.39	3	3,781	13.31	1	4
Freedom Front Plus	432	1.52	0	418	1.47	0	0
Congress of the People	172	0.61	0	197	0.69	0	0
Pan Africanist Congress of Azania	61	0.21	0	64	0.23	0	0
International Revelation Congress	3	0.01	0	23	0.08	0	0
Total	28,380	100.00	13	28,404	100.00	13	26
Valid votes	28,380	98.19		28,404	98.44		
Invalid/blank votes	523	1.81		451	1.56		
Total votes	28,903	100.00		28,855	100.00		
Registered voters/turnout	58,046	49.79		58,046	49.71		

== November 2021 election ==
The following table shows the results of the 2021 election.

Party	Ward			List			Total seats
Party	Votes	%	Seats	Votes	%	Seats	Total seats
African National Congress	15,752	53.28	12	20,313	68.77	7	19
Independent candidates	6,225	21.05	1				1
Economic Freedom Fighters	2,625	8.88	0	3,396	11.50	3	3
Democratic Alliance	2,528	8.55	2	2,554	8.65	1	3
African Transformation Movement	931	3.15	0	1,243	4.21	1	1
Freedom Front Plus	700	2.37	0	730	2.47	1	1
Lephalale Residents Party	277	0.94	0	516	1.75	1	1
Defenders of the People	291	0.98	0	322	1.09	0	0
African Christian Democratic Party	115	0.39	0	131	0.44	0	0
International Revelation Congress	21	0.07	0	159	0.54	0	0
African People's Convention	88	0.30	0	71	0.24	0	0
Able Leadership	2	0.01	0	70	0.24	0	0
United Christian Democratic Party	11	0.04	0	33	0.11	0	0
Total	29,566	100.00	15	29,538	100.00	14	29
Valid votes	29,566	98.37		29,538	97.38		
Invalid/blank votes	491	1.63		795	2.62		
Total votes	30,057	100.00		30,333	100.00		
Registered voters/turnout	64,587	46.54		64,587	46.96		

=== By-elections from November 2021 ===
The following by-elections were held to fill vacant ward seats in the period from November 2021.

Date	Ward	Party of the previous councillor	Party of the newly elected councillor
11 Sep 2024	3	Democratic Alliance	Democratic Alliance
