= Venda =

Venda may refer to:

- Venda (Bantustan), a territory in South Africa
- Venda people, an ethnic group of South Africa and Zimbabwe
- Venda language, the language they speak
- Venda Kingdom, precolonial state
- University of Venda, in South Africa
- Venda Inc, a technology company
- Monte Venda, a mountain in Italy
- La venda, a 2019 song
- Valeri F. Venda, Russian psychologist, engineer, and designer

== See also ==
- Vendée, a department of France
