= Safdar Sarki =

Pakistani-American physician (born 1965)

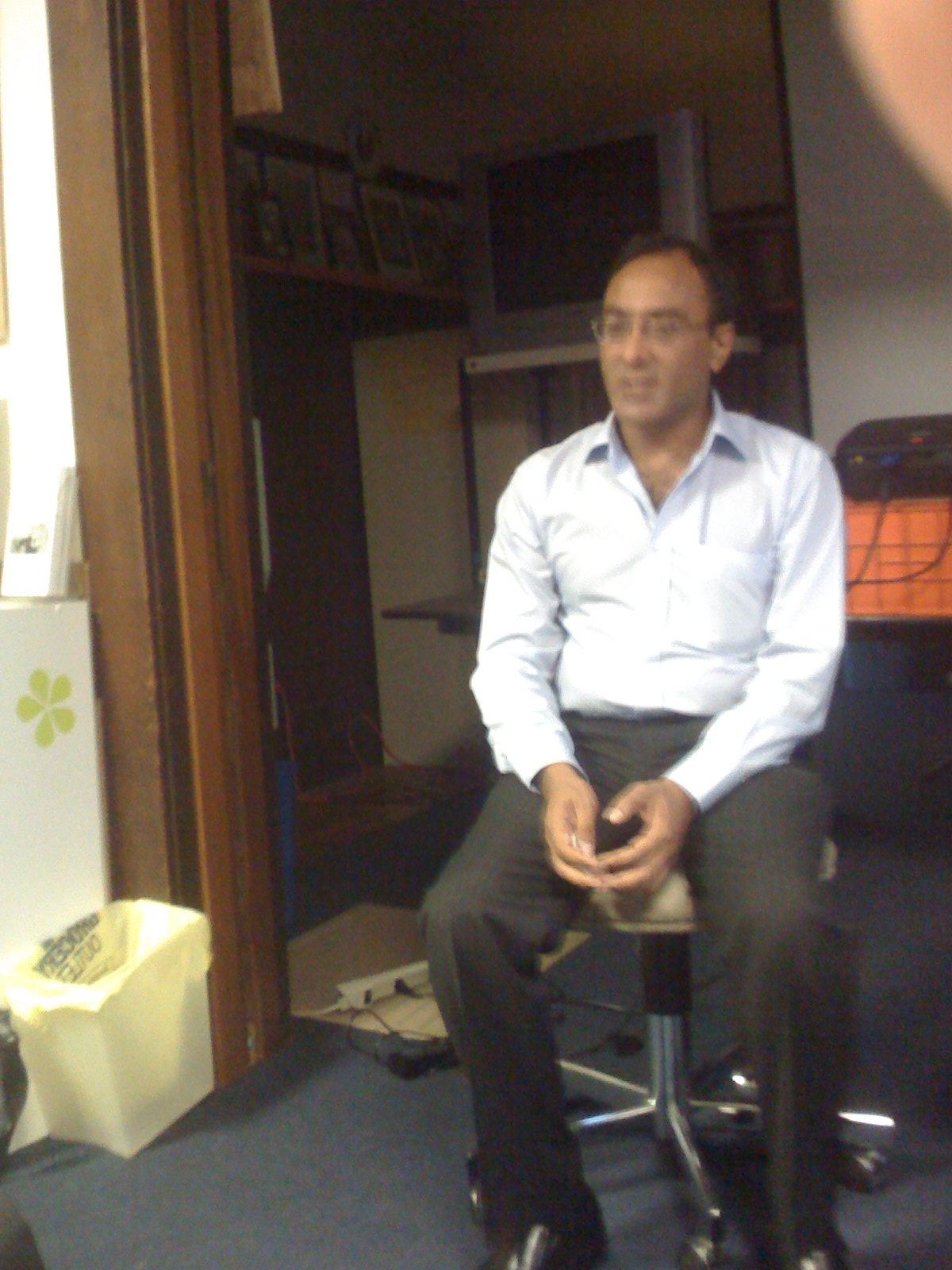
- Sarki in August 2008
- Born: December 25, 1965 (age 60); Pakistan
- Occupation: Physician
- Known for: Sindhi nationalist movement activist

Safdar Sarki, (Sindhi: صفدر سرڪي) (born December 25, 1965) a Pakistani-American physician and activist who was a chair of the World Sindhi Congress and Secretary General of the Jeay Sindh Qaumi Mahaz. As one of the many disappeared during the period of Pervez Musharraf's rule, the campaign to "find" him and get him released included human rights organizations, including Amnesty International, and the Asian Human Rights Commission calling for his release, while The New York Times and other news organizations reported that his health was in jeopardy because the Pakistani government refused to allow him necessary medical attention.

== Kidnappings ==
Sarki received his medical degree in Pakistan, but later moved to Texas, where he most recently operated a motel business. While his wife and children remain in Texas, Sarki traveled to Pakistan in early 2006. On February 24, 2006, he was seized and, according to eyewitnesses, beaten severely by members of the Pakistani security forces and held in secret for eighteen months. In October 2007, Iftikhar Muhammad Chaudhry, then Chief Justice of the Pakistani Supreme Court, compelled the Pakistani government to acknowledge that it had detained and was continuing to hold Sarki, and order him brought before the courts for further inquiry. Pakistani police then announced that Sarki was being held on charges relating to possession of illegal weapons. In early November 2007, a local judge ordered that Sarki be granted bail and released from custody.

Before either order could be carried out, Pakistani president Pervez Musharraf removed the Chief Justice from office and issued emergency decrees effectively ending the judicial inquiries into the matters of Sarki and of other detainees. The judge who granted Sarki bail was reportedly transferred to another district.

Sarki's attorneys reported that he was imprisoned in Zhob, a remote area of Baluchistan, and that his physical condition had substantially deteriorated, requiring exigent medical attention. On December 8, 2007, a court in Baluchistan directed jail authorities to transport Sarki to the provincial capital of Quetta for diagnosis and treatment of an apparent degenerative optical condition, but the authorities defied the order. According to researchers for Human Rights Watch, Sarki has apparently been tortured by Pakistani authorities during his detention.

After several delays, a renewed hearing on Sarki's detention has been set for January 28, 2008. Both Sarki's lawyers and Ali Dayan Hasan, a senior Human RIghts Watch official, told The New York Times that they fear further judicial proceedings will be postponed until Sarki's continued physical deterioration ends in his death.

When asked about the case by The New York Times in January 2008, the Pakistani ambassador to the United States, Mahmud Ali Durrani, reported being familiar with the matter, but not in a position to respond to specific questions about it.

On International Human Rights Day (December 10) in 2006, after his abduction, Sarki was awarded the annual Human Rights Community Award by the Washington, D.C.–based United Nations Association of the National Capital Area (UNA-NCA). The organization cited Sarki's leadership of the Jeay Sindh Qaumi Mahaz, a secular political party advocating for the Sindhi population.

He was released on May 2, 2008, after the Supreme Court of Pakistan ordered the heads of Pakistan's Military Intelligence and the Inter-Services Intelligence (ISI) to produce him or appear in court personally.

== See also ==
- List of solved missing person cases (2000s)
