= Valeri F. Venda =

Russian psychologist

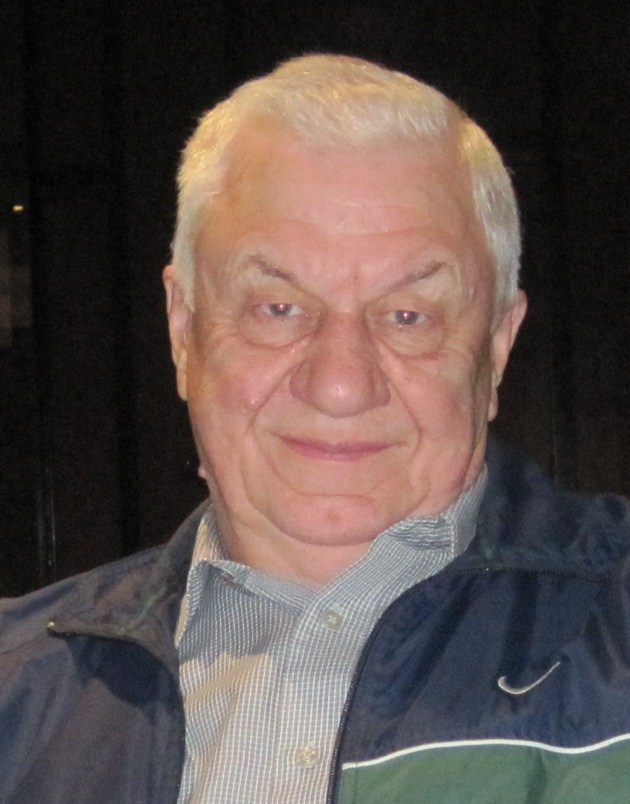

Valerii Fedorovich Venda (born August 2, 1937 in Semferopol, Soviet Union) is a Soviet and Russian psychologist, engineer, and designer. His main research areas are perception (or apperception) and cognition, the connection (attachment) between anatomical (structural) perceptual information and complex thoughts, which includes, problem solving; the process of mutual adaptation and transitions in general systems theory, the psychology of engineering and ergonomics; systems of hybrid intellect, and ergodynamics.

== Biography ==
In 1954 Venda graduated with honors from Men's High School Number 14 in Semferopol, in Crimea. In 1960 he graduated from The Moscow Power Engineering Institute with a degree in Automation of Production Processes. From 1960 onward, as an employee of the Central Research Institute of Complex Automation, he designed and created a mnemonic scheme and computer monitoring system panel for the power unit of Mosenergo Venda realized that he lacked the necessary knowledge of engineering as he tried to create a computerized information system. An expert, the Western psychologist and professor D. A. Oshanin, who had lived in Paris for a long time and worked at the Sorbonne, came to help him. Oshanin and Venda began actively integrating psychological and engineering methodology Their familiarity with V. A. Lektorskii's work on methodology and his original philosophical interpretation of general systems theory played an important role in their work. Additionally, Venda received personal permission from the Minister of Culture E. A. Furtseva to study the works of K.S. Malevich, V. V. Kandinsky, and other scientists which were then stored as classified. Venda used this knowledge to create usable information technology designs.

In early 1963, at the age of 25, Venda was appointed head of the Department of Ergonomics at the All-Russian Institute of Technical Aesthetics. In 1967 Venda defended his graduate dissertation on the subject "Methods for increasing the efficiency of automated control system power operations". He became a senior research fellow working in technical aesthetics (the title was approved by the Higher Certification Commission of the USSR in 1971). In 1973, at the age of thirty-five, Venda defended his doctoral dissertation on "Structural information models and the complexity of operational tasks" in psychological science. Beginning in 1974, he served as head of the department of engineering psychology at The Psychology Institute of the Academy of Sciences of the USSR. In addition, he worked as a professor at the Moscow Institute of Transport Engineers (MIIT) from 1977 to 1988. In 1975 he became the head of an international program on engineering psychology and labor safety in socialist countries. Due to the achievements of this program, Venda was awarded the title of Laureat for the International Prize for Outstanding Collaborative Research in Psychology by the USSR Academy of Sciences in conjunction with the Academies of Sciences of the nine socialist countries (German Democratic Republic, Berlin, October 1984).

From 1975 to 1980, Venda directed three sections of "Avant-Garde", the USSR's national program on military ergonomics. He was a member of the executive committee of the Psychological Society of the USSR (1975–1980) as well as a professor at the V. I. Lenin Military-Political Academy (1975–1987). In 1984 he became a professor specializing in the field of "labor psychology and engineering psychology". Beginning in 1985, he served as head of the department of education for the Union-wide Research Institute of Higher Education Problems and of the Union-wide Task Complex Program for Improving the Quality of Higher Education in the USSR. In the 1980s, after creating a transformational theory of system dynamics and analyzing Gorbachev's Perestroika plan (link to), Venda proposed a project for transforming the socialist economy of the USSR into a market economy without large risks and losses for the country or the people. Venda addressed the Central Committee of the Communist Party and the government of the USSR, but they rejected his proposal and proposed that he go abroad to work as a teacher.

In 1990 Venda became a professor at Loyola College in Baltimore, Maryland where he taught ergonomics and introduction to personal computers. Beginning in 1991, he directed the First program in Canada program for ergonomics and labor safety at the University of Manitoba in Winnipeg, Canada. In 2000 he served as the senior advisor for engineering psychology and usability at the USWeb company in Phoenix, Arizona. In 2001 he served as the senior advisor for ergonomics and usability at DST Systems in Kansas. Starting in 2002, he was a professor of ergonomics at National University, in San Diego, California. From 2007 to 2009 he worked as a pro-rector of the Yalta University of Management and International Relations and a professor at the Crimean Humanitarian University in Yalta.

From 1992 to 2002, Venda was a member of the editorial board of the International Journal Human–Computer Interaction (US). From 1996 to 2005 he was a member of the editorial board of the International Journal of Occupational Safety and Ergonomics (Poland).

Venda is a laureate of The Distinguished International Colleague Award for outstanding contribution to the human factors field (US, 1996) and an Honorary Fellow of the Human Factors and Ergonomics Society (USA, 2002).

M.D. Vacin, the science writer for the newspaper "Pravda" has long worked to popularize Venda's works.

== Scientific activity ==
=== Processes of mutual adaptation ===
In his works, Venda introduced the concept of mutual adaptation. He formulated the laws of mutual adaptation and transformation of system structures. In his opinion, these laws are common for all types of systems

(No 1) The law of mutual adaptation for any system :The development of any system includes the process of mutual adaptation between the internal components of the system and between the system as a whole and the environment. Venda believed that each developing system involves the process of mutual adaptation. He suggested that the development of people, society, any living system, differs from the development of inanimate systems in that it represents a process of mutual advanced multilevel adaptation of cells, of human internal organs, among themselves and of man as a whole with the environment. He analyzed the relationship between the material processes of mutual adaptation and dialectics, between the material world and its ideal reflection by humans.

(No 2) The law of maximum efficiency: The effectiveness of the system with a certain structure is optimal if the value of the controlled factor of mutual adaptation is also optimal. Consequently, the dependence of the efficiency criterion on any factor of mutual adaptation has a bell-shaped distribution (Figure 1). Venda conducted experimental studies into the influence of various factors of mutual adaptation on the effectiveness of systems, including human activities. He revealed that as a factor of mutual adaptation, any mental function, any parameter of the means or the means of activity.

(No. 3) The law of multistructural systems (Figure 2): A system can have a number of structures, each of which corresponds to a special bell-shaped distribution of the dependence of system efficiency on the chosen factor of mutual adaptation of the system to the environment. The structure of the system can be a discrete series with distinct differences in the values of the optimal factors of mutual adaptation. These maximized efficiencies for different structures are called strategies.

(No. 4) The law of transformation: The structures of the system are transformed into each other through a common state within the system. The state of the system, common to the two structures, is reflected as the point of intersection of their bell-shaped curves (Figure 3). Venda believed that studying the development in any field, analyzing both single-structure uniform models and multistructural transformational models, was fundamental in describing the dynamics of any complex systems as a wave-like process with an obligatory intermediate decline in system efficiency.

Venda presented a new type of graphical nomograms, quadrangles with four quadrants that allow the representation of any experimental polycyclic processes, including mutual adaptation processes, and subsequently substantiated the possibility of their application in psychology, physiology, mathematics and other sciences. The variant of the quadrigram structure is shown in Fig. 4. The places of particular models in quadrants and the direction of transitions can vary depending on the research tasks, the features of the environment, and the system. An example of constructing the dynamics of a medium system on a quadrigram is shown in Fig. 5.

He introduced the concepts of system strategy or structure, a discrete series of structural system strategies: characteristic strategy curve, invariance of integral system efficiency: congruent structural strategy, basic divergent structural strategy: structure association, and reversible transformation.

=== Transformation learning theory and system dynamics ===
Venda tried to revise the traditional psychological view of learning processing. Unlike Herman Ebbinghaus's unified exponential theory of teaching (1890), Venda proposed a transformational learning theory (based on his transformational laws). He presented this as a wave-shaped learning curve with periods of decline in the transition from one activity structure to the next. His transformational learning theory greatly expands the possibilities of analyzing regularities and predicting individual development and systemic progress.

He introduced the concepts of transformational theory of systems dynamics, transformations (the emergence of wave-like transformational processes in the economy, energy, science, etc.), and co-adaptation (the process of mutual adaptation in living, inanimate and complex systems, in particular ecosystems and man-machine-environment systems). In 1995 he published the book "Dynamics in ergonomics, psychology, and decisions: Introduction to Ergodynamics", which is an introduction to ergodynamics (the process of mutual adaptation between a trained worker and structurally progressing instruments of labor).

He proposed graphic models of predicting the dynamics of system efficiency and developed new methods of statistical processing of experimental data on learning processes.

Venda suggested that all systems involved in the evolutionary process are encompassed by a continuous comprehensive process of mutual adaptation with periodic transformations of structures, generating new species, inventions, discoveries and wave-like dynamics of development.

=== Hybrid intelligence systems ===
Venda formulated the principles of synthesis and functioning of natural, evolutionarily developed, and artificial, human-machine and socio-technical, hybrid intelligent systems. He developed fundamentally new forms of intellectual activity in science, design, management, and technology – the theory of hybrid intelligence systems, including natural (biological and social), artificial (technical) and combined (human-machine, socio-technical). This theory was based on the laws of mutual adaptation and transformation. He considered the system of hybrid intelligence as a group system of collective thinking, using information technology, adapted to each individual participant and to the whole group.

He singled out the main principles of hybrid intelligence, such as evolution, a correspondence to the deep interests and structures of man, animals, and biospheres; democracy as an expression of equality, common interests and responsibilities of participants, flexible composition and flexible hierarchy, in which everyone is the leader at the time when he is the most competent, useful, and far-sighted; mutual adaptation of all participants and components; the transformation of strategies as a path to the creative generation of new strategies; and the intensification of communication processes. At the same time, he represented thinking strategies of hidden participants in hybrid intelligence using computer programs. Fig 6 shows an example of the structure of a hybrid intelligence system for the collective solution of complex problems of operational control, design, planning, and training on the basis of adaptive information technology.

=== Engineering psychology, ergonomics and usability ===
Venda experimentally investigated the problem of functional adaptation of the informational system structure for any specific human activity. He proposed a multi-level adaptation of technical facilities and external conditions for the operator in order to maximize the use of specific human capabilities in a management system. These adaptation levels include total, contingent, functional, group, individual, and individually-operative adaptation. Venda examined the engineering and psychological problems with the synthesis of information display tools from the position of structural and psychological concepts, whose essence can be reduced to the fact that the structure of the information display system statistically determines the strategies and complexity of human decision making. On the other hand, the goal of the optimal synthesis of information display systems was specified as the closest approximation of the real values of the psychological factors on the complexity of solving problems to their optimal values.

Venda developed theoretical, methodological, and practical recommendations on occupational guidance and on the selection and training of specialists. Based on the developed psychological principles of choosing multicomponent means of information display structures, he considered engineering, psychological, and ergonomic questions of artistic design for information tools and proposed heuristics for designers. He paid particular attention to the artistic, compositional, and analytical methods of implementing the formulated principles in order to select a structure for information display facilities.

He attempted to unify parallel notions of information models (complex information display tools) and mental models (ontogenetic, generalized reflection of objects, corrected on the basis of the real results of solving problems) and to bring these notions into terminological correspondence.

He studied the psychological factors of the complexity of solving mental problems and their quantitative measures, depending on the structure of the visual information represented and concluded that if a problem is optimally presented, it loses a significant part of its complexity and becomes trivial.

He studied theoretical ergonomics and engineering psychology, using the laws of mutual adaptation and transformation, and investigated the mutual adaptation between the structure of the perceived display and the thought process. Venda collaborated with A. F. Dyakov and K. V. Frolov and together they experimentally investigated the dynamics, efficiency, and safety for the operators of power assets and systems. Venda gave psychological and ergonomic recommendations for designing information technology and for ensuring the safety of human-machine-environment systems. He stressed the importance of Russian science in the formation of the theoretical and applied bases for the usability of information technology.

=== Studies on the development of creative abilities ===
Venda put forward the idea that it is possible to purposefully, artificially develop subconscious creative thinking after he studied the biographies and works of A. S. Pushkin, Napoleon, and other outstanding personalities, and analyzed the results of his own longitudinal experiment, which lasted more than sixty-five years. Venda believed that artificially developing a child's subconscious creative thinking could enhance their intellectual talent, as well as instill in them superior motivation for intellectual success.

== Research projects ==
Venda was the project head for the development and implementation of integrated information systems for Mosenergo TPP-21's power generation unit, the head of the workshops of the Voskresensky and Shchyokinsky Chemical Combine, the automated slabbing 1150 for the metallurgical plant (Galati, Romania), and for the integrated power systems of Transcaucasia in the Urals. He was the project manager for the development of camera consoles for the system of centralized operational control of urban transport in Moscow – the "Start" system.

He invented, designed, created, and explored a new kind of safe workplace for assembling electronic devices in a practical manner. A feature of his work was the indirect observation of workers in their operations when assembling electronic devices. He obtained a patent for this invention on June 22, 1995.

Venda developed ergonomic recommendations for the prevention of accidents at nuclear power plants and other processing facilities. For the first time, he used the registration of oculomotor behavior and the complex psycho-physiological parameters of a person for the evaluation of information technology.

A scientific analysis of ancient astrologers’ activities was among his outside interests. Venda thought that astrologers mistakenly believed that they were studying the influence of stars on people's lives, but, in fact, as they were observing the starry sky as a complex clock and simultaneously recording events on Earth, they were accumulating valuable data on cyclic processes in nature.

He proposed a strategy for winning the game "Sportloto 6 of 49", trying to solve the problem not as a traditional mathematical problem, but as psychological one, arguing that although the balls pop up chaotically, after studying the for the majority of players’ strategy in playing sportloto, one can see there is a chance for a constant probability of winning much more than prescribed by probability theory.

== Teaching ==
Venda was a professor at MIIT, VPA – named after Lenin, Loyola College, Manitoba University, National University (San Diego, USA). He gave lectures and seminars at 56 universities, including Harvard University, Stanford University, Massachusetts Institute of Technology (Cambridge), the University of Paris (Paris) (French: Université de Paris), and many universities in Japan, Sweden and other countries.

Venda Authored and co-authored 23 books and more than 300 scientific articles. Over 120 of his works have been published abroad, including 4 monographs in English, Slovak and Spanish. His books were used as university textbooks in the USSR, Slovakia, Spain, the US, and Canada.

== Awards ==
In 1984 Venda was awarded International Prize for outstanding research in psychology by joint decision of USSR Academy of Science and academies of science of nine other socialist countries.

In 1996 he was the first person received a new Distinguished International Colleague Award for outstanding contribution to the human factors and ergonomics field from USA Human Factors and Ergonomics Society

In 2002 he was the first person elected Honorary fellow USA Human Factors and Ergonomics Society

== Publication ==
=== Monographs ===
- Venda, V. F. (1969). Средства отображения информации: эргономические исследования и художественное конструирование [Information displays: ergonomic evaluation and industrial design] (work) (in Russian). Moscow: Энергия. p. 304.
- Venda, V. F. (1975). Инженерная психология и синтез систем отображения информации [Engineering psychology and design of information display systems] (work) (in Russian). Moscow: Машиностроение. p. 396.
- Venda, V. F. (1978). Организация труда операторов (инженерно-психологические проблемы) [Organizing of operator work (engineering psychological issues)] (work) (in Russian). Moscow: Экономика. p. 224.
- Venda, V. F. (1980). Видеотерминалы в информационном взаимодействии (инженерно-психологические аспекты) [Video terminals in information interaction (engineering psychological issues)] (work) (in Russian). Moscow: Энергия. p. 200.
- Venda, V. F. (1980). Inzinierska psychologia a synteza systemov zobrazovania informacii [Engineering psychology and design of information display systems] (work) (in Slovenian). Bratislava: Veda. p. 240.
- Venda, V. F. (1982). Инженерная психология и синтез систем отображения информации [Engineering psychology and design of information display systems] (work) (in Russian) (2nd ed.). Moscow: Машиностроение. p. 344.
- Venda, V.; Lomov, B. (1983). González, Marta (ed.). La interrelación hombre – máquina en los sistemas de información [Human-machine interection in information system] (work) (in Spanish). Moscow: Прогресс. p. 432.
- Savelyev, A.; Venda, V. (1989). Higher education and computerization (work). Moscow: Progress. p. 256. ISBN 978-5-01-001138-3.
- Venda, V. F. (1990). Системы гибридного интеллекта: эволюция, психология, информатика [Hybrid intelligent systems: evolution, psychology, informatics] (work) (in Russian). Moscow: Машиностроение. p. 448. ISBN 978-5-217-01006-6.
- Venda, Valery F.; Venda, Yuri V. (1995). Dynamics in ergonomics, psychology and decisions (work). Norwood, NJ: Ablex Publishing Corporation. p. 503.

=== Shorter books ===
- Venda, V. F. (1964). Оператор и машина [Human-operator and machine] (brochure). New in life, science, technology. Series: Technology (in Russian). Moscow: Знание. p. 48.
- Venda, V. F. (1970). Информационная техника и эргономика [Information technology and ergonomics] (brochure). New in life, science, technology. Series: Technology (in Russian). Moscow: Знание. p. 48.
- Venda, V. F. (1977). Инженерная психология и труд оператора АСУ [Engineering psychology and human operator work at automated systems] (brochure). New in life, science, technology. Series: Management science (in Russian). Moscow: Знание. p. 64.
- Venda, V. F. (1988). Обыкновенная психология "необыкновенных чудес" [Ordinary psychology of "extraordinary miracles"] (brochure). New in life, science, technology. Series: Scientific atheism (in Russian). Moscow: Знание. p. 64.
- Venda, V. F. (1989). Волны прогресса [The waves of progress] (brochure). New in life, science, technology. Series: Philosophy (in Russian). Moscow: Знание. p. 62.

=== Selected papers ===
- Venda, V. F.; Mitkin, A. A. (1969). "Risultati di uno sdudio obiettivo sull'attivita di un operatore" [Data on objective study of operator work]. La Scuola in Azione (in Italian). 6: 80–95.
- Lomov, B. F.; Venda, V. F. (1977). "Human Factors: Problems of adapting systems for the interaction of information to the individual: The theory of hybrid intelligent systems". Proceedings of the Human Factors Society 21st Annual Meeting (keynote address). San Francisco: Human Factors Society. pp. 1–9.
- Venda, V. F. (1980). "Voies nouvelles pour une theorie de l'apprentissage" [The new learning theory]. Present et future de la psychologie du travail [Present and future of work Psychology] (paper) (in French). Paris: EAP. pp. 586–594.
- Venda, V. F. (1983). "On the transformation learning theory". Third European Conference on Human Decision Making and Manual Control (paper). Roskilde, Denmark: Human Decision Making and Manual Control. pp. 345–354.
- Venda, V. F. (1984). "In searching of general regularities of adaptation dynamics: on the transformation learning theory". In Degreef, E.; van Buggenhaut, J. (eds.). Trends in Mathematical Psychology (paper). New York CityA.: Elsevier Science Publishing Company, INC. pp. 121–158. ISBN 978-0-444-87512-9.
- Venda, V. F. (1985). "The fundamental laws of psychology and ergonomics". Proceedings of IX – th Congress of the Int. Ergonomics Association (paper). Bournemouth, England: Ergonomics Association. pp. 265–281.
- Venda, V. F. (1986). "On transformation learning Theory". Behavioral Science. 31 (1): 1–11. doi:10.1002/bs.3830310102.
- Venda, V. F. (1986). "On the laws of mutual adaptation in man - machine and other systems". Ergonomics - Human Factors III (paper). Amsterdam: North - Holland. pp. 151–272.
- Venda, V. F. (1988). "The quadrigrams of mutual adaption as a new model of human activity". In USW (ed.). Proceedings of the X-th Congress of International Ergonomics Association (paper). Sydney: IEA. pp. 141–156.
- Venda, V. F. (1989). "Ergonomics. Education and Safety Systems Research in the USSR". In Mital, Anil (ed.). Advances in Industrial Ergonomics and Safety I (paper). Philadelphia: Taylor & Francis. pp. 3–12. ISBN 978-0-85066-493-5.
- Venda, V. F.; Venda, Y. V. (1991). "Transformation Dynamics in Complex Systems". Journal of the Washington Academy of Sciences. 81 (4): 163–184. ISSN 0043-0439.
- Venda, Yuri V.; Venda, Valery F. (1992). "An introduction to the transformation dynamics: The law and theory of transformations". In Kumar, Shrawan (ed.). Edvances in Indastrial Ergonomics and Safety IV (paper). London: Taylor & Francis. pp. 86–96. ISBN 978-0-203-22133-4.
- Venda, V. F.; Thornton – Trump, A. V. (1992). "Applications of transformations theory in biomechanics". In Kumar, Shrawan (ed.). Edvances in Indastrial Ergonomics and Safety IV (paper). London: Taylor & Francis. pp. 97–106. ISBN 978-0-203-22133-4.
- Venda, V.; Strong, D.; Hawalehska, O.; Rychlicki, B. (1992). "Human factor and transformations of manufacturing technologies". In Kumar, Shrawan (ed.). Edvances in Indastrial Ergonomics and Safety IV (paper). London: Taylor & Francis. pp. 107–115. ISBN 978-0-203-22133-4.
- Yufik, Y. M.; Sheridan, T. B.; Venda, V. F. (1993). "Quantitative evaluation and performance prediction in Human – computer interaction: Applications and case studies". Proceedings of the Fifth International Conference on HCI (paper). Amsterdam: Elsevier. pp. 642–647.
- Venda, V. F. (1993). "Work efficiency vs. complexity: Introduction to ergodynamics". Journal of the Washington Academy of Sciences. 83 (1): 9–1. ISSN 0043-0439.
- Venda, V. F.; Hendrick, Hal W. (1994). "Ergodynamics and macroergonomics in analysis of decision – making efficiency and complexity". International Journal of Human – Computer Interaction. 6 (3): 253–274. doi:10.1080/10447319409526095.
- Venda, V. F. (1994). "Transformations in work structures: theoretical fundamentals of the ergodynamics". Human factors in organizational design and management - IV (paper). Stockholm, Sweden: North-Holland. pp. 269–274.
- Venda, V. F. (1995). "Ergodynamics: theory and applications". Ergonomics. 38 (8): 1600–1616. doi:10.1080/00140139508925212.
- Venda, V. F.; Chachko, S. A. (1996). "Ergodynamics and Hybrid Intelligence Systems in the Reliability of Power Plant Operators". International Journal of Occupational Safety and Ergonomics. 2 (2): 93–108. doi:10.1080/10803548.1996.11076339. PMID 10602580.
- Venda, V. F.; Trybus, J. R. (2000). "Cognitive Ergonomics: Theory, Laws, and Graphic Models". International Journal of Cognitive Ergonomics. 4 (4): 331–349. doi:10.1207/S15327566IJCE0404_4.
- Venda, V. F.; at al. (2000). "Usability of the graphic information: navigation systems and cars for seniors and disabled". Human Factors and Ergonomics Society. Vol. 44. San-Diego: SAGE piblshing. pp. 727–730. doi:10.1177/154193120004402888. S2CID 110395451.
- Venda, V. F.; Kalin, V. K.; Trofimov, A. Y. (2008). "The Laws of Ergonomics Applied to Design and Testing of Workstations". Ergonomics and Psychology Developments in Theory and Practice (paper). New York: CRC Press Taylor and Francis Group. pp. 71–88. ISBN 9781420067002.
- Venda, V. F. (2017). "О законах взаимной адаптации и трансформации систем" [On the Laws of Mutual Adaptation and Transformations of the Systems]. Вопросы философии (in Russian): 94–105. ISSN 0042-8744.
