= Thom Wainggai =

West Papuan scholar (1937–1996)

Thomas Wapai N.S Wainggai
- Born: 5 December 1937; Hollandia, Dutch East Indies
- Died: 12 March 1996 (aged 58); Jakarta, Indonesia
- Resting place: Jayapura, Papua
- Education: Cenderawasih University; Okayama University; University of New York at Albany; Florida State University
- Occupations: Philosopher; Lecturer; Tribal Leader; Political activist
- Employer: Cenderawasih University
- Known for: Candidate for Governor of Irian Jaya
- Movement: Republic of West Melanesia
- Criminal charge: Subversion
- Criminal penalty: 20 years prison term; Arrested: 14 December 1988; Died: 2 March 1996
- Spouse: Teruko Wainggai
- Children: 3 (2 boys, 1 girl)
- Relatives: Herman Wainggai (Nephew)

Thomas Wapai Newei Sarampayai Wainggai (also known as Thomas Wainggai, Thom Wainggai or Dr. Thom; 5 December 1937 – 12 March 1996) was a West Papuan scholar, political and cultural leader, philosopher, and nationalist; as well as an advocate of West Papuan self-determination and Melanesian identity. He became one of the first West Papuan to get an advanced education outside of West Papua region. In 1988, he was arrested for his political beliefs and teachings and was sentenced to two decades behind bars. In 1996, he died as a political prisoner in a Jakarta prison.

== Education ==
Dr. Thom was born and raised in Hollandia (currently Jayapura), then New Guinea part of Dutch East Indies, where he spent his young days. He went to school in the city. After high school, he enrolled at the Cenderawasih University, one of the leading universities in West Papua region. At the university, Dr. Thom excelled. He built up good grades and was selected for the exchange program in Japan. He graduated with a degree in Law at the Okayama University. He then traveled to the United States to study on a Fulbright Scholarship. He graduated with a master's degree (MA) in Public Administration at the State University of New York at Albany, New York, and then earned a Doctorate of Philosophy from Florida State University in 1987.

== Political views ==
Dr. Thom was involved in politics as at an early age. As a young man, he watched West Papuans fight against the Indonesian occupation of their land since 1969. In 1988, as one of the West Papuan respected leaders, he began to teach a new ideology: he taught that West Papuans are Melanesian people who are entitled to self-determination. Dr. Thom channeled the frustration of the people of West Papua over the legality of Indonesian occupation of their lands. In his view, the manner in which West Papua was handed over to Indonesia was highly unfair, grossly unjust, and illegal based on International Human Rights laws and conventions. Dr. Thom, a trained lawyer did refuse to hide his disdain and dissatisfaction toward Indonesian occupation of West Papua and determined to fight against Indonesia through logical and legal arguments. He used his knowledge of international statues to challenge the legality of Indonesian occupation of West Papua, but during the Suharto regime, it was a war he couldn't win without losing his own life.

James Vorendberg of Asia Watch explained the kind of country Indonesia was – and continues to this day – during Dr. Thom's time:

Indonesia, ostensibly a Democracy, is in fact an authoritarian state where real decision-making power rests with President Suharto and the Indonesian military. Presidential decrees and administrative regulations are the major source of law, and the Dewan Perwakilan Rakyat (DPR), the national parliament dominated - though appointment and electoral procedures - by the ruling party, GOLKAR (Golongan Karya, literally "functional groups"), serves more as a forum for discussion of national issues than as a legislature.

The Indonesian government under President Suharto was essentially a "dictatorship" in which presidential directives were executed as laws making it extremely hard for critics to engage the state in public debate. The basic rights of speech and public discourses were effectively banned. Hundreds of Indonesians, including West Papuans, were arrested for speaking out against the state. Dr. Thom's dreams of an independent West Melanesia was seen as an extremely dangerous movement, and in 1988, the movement had its first test of the Suharto military justice.

== Arrest and incarceration ==
The flag of West Melanesia

Toward the end of 1988 - between November and December - Dr. Thom and his supporters met at his place where they mapped out a plan to declare the independence of so-called "West Melanesia". On 14 December 1988, they marched to Mandala Stadium in Jayapura, Irian Jaya (currently Papua). At the stadium, the Republic of West Melanesia was proclaimed with Dr. Thom as president of the newly declared independent state. A new flag was raised featuring 14 stars with three coloured bars of black, red and white. The flag had been sewn by his Japanese wife. It would be the first time that West Papuan independence movement declared West Papua as a Melanesian territory. Dr. Thom and his supporters apparently violated the anti-subversive law, Presidential Statement (Penpres) No. 11 of 1963 on Eradication of Subversive Activities.

The Indonesian reaction was anticipated: police officers arrived at the scene and apprehended Dr. Thom and other West Papuan political leaders; they were arrested and taken to military headquarters for interrogations. Taking these prisoners to military facilities made it impossible for family members to visit them.

=== Trial ===
Since the Suharto regime rose to power in the 1967, the rights of all citizens were never protected; instead, they were discarded whenever they run counter to the will of the regime. In 1989, Dr. Wainggai found himself in the same predicament.

In April 1989, Papuans gathered to witness Dr. Thom, hailed by some as one of their heroes, taking on the full force of the Indonesian jurisprudence. According to Asia Watch, Dr. Thom was tried by the district court in Jayapura, in the months of April and June, in hearings that defied commonsense as it became transparent even to the unlearned that the Indonesian government (court) were pursuing long prison term against Dr. Thom even if it means violating common civil rights he was entitled to it. The court room was packed as indigenous people gathered to hear the proceedings. In June, however, the numbers of Papuans who showed up fell dramatically because of political intimidation; police fired in the air and attendees were subjected to physical rough inspection.

=== Dr. Thom vs. State ===
The Act of Free Choice held West Papua in 1969 was a highly controversial election. To West Papuan nationalists, the failure to consult them and the lack of equal representations at the polls was a slap in the face of Democracy. Lack of transparency on the part of the UN made that plebiscite a mere scam coated in the name of Democracy. The apparent disregard of the rights of West Papuans in the execution of this plebiscite led to the formation of the Free Papua Movement (OPM). Sympathizers and loosely associated groups often clashed with Indonesian police in violent struggles for control.

Intellectual leaders such as Dr. Thom, however, preferred to challenge the legality of the acquisition of West Papua by pointing out the inconsistencies and discrepancies within the government policies and national statues (constitution). They preferred intellectual rational debate based on the reading of the laws. Asian Watch cited an event that demonstrated this new approach. Prior to the public demonstration at the stadium, Dr. Thom dispatched supporters to notify the Indonesian authority of his planned public declaration of West Melanesian independence and the location of the event, which essentially eradicate state's claim of conspiracy to overthrow the government. This new method of non-violent approach to Indonesian's claim over West Papua, made the state case against Dr. Thom extremely fluid and fundamentally weak. The state could not charge Dr. Thom with conspiracy to overthrow the government by force, nor did they have any evidence to just charge him for violence, public disturbance or obstruction of justice because his movement was completely devoid of violence and public disturbance.

Dr. Thom's movement was not only unique to the OPM's struggle, but one that renewed the call for dialogue and reasonable debate over facts and mere claims - a call to revisit the legality of the 1969 election. He apparently borrowed the Mahatma Gandhi and Martin Luther King style approach to the struggles of West Papuans. Indonesia saw him as extremely dangerous. (Note: Herman Wainggai, Dr. Thom's own nephew who followed his uncle's footsteps into the horror of Indonesian prison and served two years, referred to his uncle as the father of nonviolent struggle for West Papuan independence.) (Note: Dr. Thom's method caught the Indonesian government off guard, noted the Asia Watch.)

=== Judgement ===
On September 7, 1989, Dr. Wainggai was sentenced to 20 years in prison. (Note: Dr. Thom would have been 71 if he served his full sentence.) It is obvious from this Asia Watch report that the Indonesian government wanted to convict Dr. Wainggai at all costs, even if means bending and ignoring his rights to a fair trial. The report summed up the trial this way: "The Trial was marked by the irregularity that characterized all Indonesian political trials, including restricted access by lawyers to their client, insufficient materials to prepare the defense, failure to call defense witnesses and limited time for cross examination."

Dr. Thom was held in a prison in West Papua for eight years, while his wife was kept in a separate prison designed for women. The couple were held in Jayapura prison from 1988 to 1990 before the Suharto regime relocated them to Jakarta amidst continual violent protests by West Papuan separatists. The conditions were absolutely harsh, but they had family and West Papua loyalists and die-hard nationalists visited him often.

Dr. Thom was sent to Cipinang Penitentiary Institution (LP Cipinang) in Indonesian capital city Jakarta, while his wife was transferred to a prison in Tangerang, then in West Java.

== Death ==
While the conditions in the state penitentiary in Jakarta were comparatively better to that in Jayapura, Dr. Thom's health gradually deteriorated. Keeping the Wainggai couple in Jakarta made it extremely complicated for their relatives to visit them on a regular basis. On March 12, 1996, six years after his transfer to Jakarta, Dr. Thom succumbed to the illness he suffered; he died in jail.

Since the Indonesian government did not provide adequate explanation as to the true cause of Dr. Thom's death, relatives in Irian Jaya believed that he died from poisoning - a position that the Council on Foreign Relations echoed in its findings while investigating the issues of West Papua.

According to reports, Dr. Thom returned from the United States in late 1987 and worked as a lecturer at the Cenderawasih University. He was also elevated to a senior position in the provincial planning office in Jayapura. What triggered his radical move to declare West Papua an independent state remained a debatable issue. It is also debatable why he only planned with a few people prior to the demonstration at Mandala Stadium where he was arrested. Some suggested that Dr. Thom may have been unhappy and decided to take his personal anger to the national arena. Sidney Jones of Asia Watch provided a possible explanation for Dr. Thom's decision. According to Sidney, Dr. Thom had a personal goal that was to lead Irian Jaya as governor. In 1987, he garnered enough support to run as a candidate in the 1987 governor's election. Unfortunately, he only received a few votes by the Regional People's Representative Council (DPRD, provincial parliament) of Irian Jaya. Sidney pointed to a popular view that he may have taken his personal dissatisfaction too far. This view suggested that Dr. Thom's decision to declare West Melanesia as an independent state came to being after the election, however, it didn't explain why Indonesian locked Dr. Thom up when he returned from Okayama University, for six months years back. It seems that Dr. Thom had held this position prior to 1987.

Another "theory" which emerged after Dr. Thom suddenly died in jail, after only serving only nine years of his 20 years prison term, is that the Indonesian authority poisoned Dr. Thom. This theory is also widely accepted by authors and foreign reporters as the cause of Dr. Thom's death. For instance, Denise C. Blair and David L. Philips wrote that Dr. Thom died in prison from "food poisoning" in 1996. However, they failed to provide evidence to support that claim. Furthermore, the materials available contain little substantive evidence to support this claim. It may have emerged as West Papuans tried to make sense of what happened to their leader. On the other hand, Indonesia's explanation also seemed sketchy. To this day, it remains somewhat vague to say with all certainty that Dr. Thom died of food poisoning; there must be hard-evidence to support this claim, so far, there's little.

== See also ==
- Papua conflict
