= Universal Declaration of the Rights of Peoples =

The Universal Declaration of the Rights of Peoples was first drafted and elaborated during three round-table conferences that were organized by the Unrepresented Nations and Peoples Organization (UNPO) Tartu Coordination Office on 29–30 August 1998; 31 October – 1 November 1998, and 16–17 April 1999 in Tartu and Otepää, Estonia.

More than forty people participated in the discussions and hundreds of formulations of statements were considered. As a result, the draft of the document was adopted simultaneously in three languages (English, Russian, and Estonian) at the last session on 17 April 1999 in Tartu. The document's fifth draft was adopted by the UNPO at its VI General Assembly meeting in Tallinn, Estonia on 17 February 2001.

The Permanent Peoples' Tribunal was established in 1979, based on the principles of the Universal Declaration.
