= Herman Wainggai =

West Papuan leader (born 1973)

- Born: 1973 (age 52–53); Jayapura, Irian Jaya, Indonesia
- Occupation: Diplomat
- Known for: Political prisoner: 4 months (2000-2001) and (2002-2004); Escaped to Australia on a canoe
- Movement: West Papua National Authority (WPNA)
- Relatives: Thom Wainggai (uncle)
- Website: hermanwainggai.net

Herman Wainggai is a West Papuan leader living in exile in the United States of America and banned for life from his hometown, Jayapura, the capital city of Papua in Indonesia. He is a former political prisoner who took on the Indonesian government and almost cost him his life. Wainggai escaped to Australia, where he lived briefly before traveling to the United States where he resides today. He is known to many in Australia and the world as the man who escaped on a canoe to Australia in 2006.

== Early childhood ==
Mr. Wainggai was born in Jayapura, the capital city of then Irian Jaya province, in 1973. He grew up in a fisherman family. Because he was shy, he spent most of his young days at home playing with his own toys and helping his mother and father. He recalled going to the market with his mother to sell their father's catch of the day. According to him, it was the only source of income. Mr. Wainggai was among the 10 Papuan students to get a government scholarship. Unfortunately, the Indonesian government rejected his scholarship without any reasonable explanation so he assumed that because his uncle Dr. Thom Wainggai - one of the famous activists in West Papua - was in jail at that time and that both shared the same surname, the Indonesian government refused to fund his education.

== First incarceration ==
In 2000, Mr. Wainggai and his fellow West Papuan activists arranged one of the largest protests in West Papuan history to commemorate the raising of the Morning Star flag and in recognition of West Papuan sovereignty. They marched from Cenderawasih University to downtown Jayapura to express their anger, frustration, and to raise the flag – an outlawed flag in the region. After a very long march and few clashes with Indonesian police along the way, West Papuan students and local supporters arrived at the Imbi Park in the heart of Jayapura. There, Mr. Wainggai and other activists were arrested. They were taken to one of the police stations in Jayapura and held for hours under severe non-stop interrogation. After 16 long hours of interrogation by the intelligence officers all armed with rifles, students were released while he and two other leaders were left behind to serve four months in prison. They were denied lawyers at the time of the Interview and were held for long hours with sleep deprivation. His father was arrested earlier and about a month later, they were united in one room. The conditions in prison were really bad. In any democratic society, the presumption of innocence is a common right given to the accused, but in this case, Mr. Wainggai and his fellow inmates were interrogated without the presence of lawyers, though they asked to see lawyers throughout the cause of the interrogation. They were locked up "without a fair trial" and were denied basic necessities political prisoners so deserved. They only slept on the floor using only newspapers as their beds. There were no shower and toilet. They did everything normal human beings wouldn't do in normal situations, in that little room. For four months, they appeared in court each month until their final hearing, which occurred at their third trial. The Judge ruled that because they were peaceful protesters, they would only serve four months. They were, however, credited for time served so they walked out of the Court House free men. For Mr. Wainggai, it was a wonderful experience. All they did was thanking God and then went out to meet with their families who were anxiously waiting for them outside the courtroom.

== Targeted in Fiji ==
In 2001, after his release from Indonesian prison, Mr. Wainggai headed of Papua New Guinea where he continued his political activism - organizing meetings and holding nonviolent workshops across the country. While in PNG, he acquired a passport; something he wasn't able to do in Indonesia as a political activist.

In 2002, after his return to West Papua, he was invited to go to Fiji to attend the Pacific Islands Forum (PIF) meeting there. He traveled to Fiji using his newly issued passport to lobby for support from members of the forum; hoping to ask them to support the struggles of West Papuans for self-determination, but he had no idea what awaited him in Fiji. As soon as he stepped off the plane, the Fijian immigration authority hauled him into a room for questioning. He was shocked and demanded to know why he was detained, but the Fiji immigration officials did not give him a reason as to why he was being held. Later, he was told that something was not right about his immigration papers, which was quite ironic considering the fact that he boarded the plane to Fiji without any issues at the airport. Mr. Wainggai was locked up in a small room at the airport for 24 hours. The next day, a Fijian Immigration official went to the room where he was detained and gave him a visa and a said to him in his Fijian accent - "Welcome to Fiji". Looking back, Mr. Wainggai believed he was being targeted by Indonesia using Fiji immigration official. In fact, traveling around Melanesia doesn't require entry or visitor's visa if you are using a passport from a member state, but for some reasons he was held up at the airport over visitor's visa. It is also likely, according to Mr. Wainggai's own story, that the Fijian government may have notified Indonesia of his arrival in Fiji and may have conspired to arrest him on his return to West Papua, which was the case when he returned home from Fiji.

Mr. Wainggai revealed that he spent half a year working with NGOs in Fiji to lobby the leaders of the PIF on behalf of the West Papuan cause. He told the Pacific Islands members that not standing up to Indonesia was a sign that the PIF members were perfectly fine with the massacre of Melanesian West Papuans. He made an impassioned plea to the PIF before returning to him home - West Papua.

== Second incarceration ==
On his arrival, he was arrested and charged with "subversion" and was thrown in jail. Subversion is the 'conspiracy to overthrow' the government, or work against the government the Indonesia. After hours of court hearings, his defense team successfully argued his case and the judge decided that his crime didn't warrant a 20-year prison term. Mr. Wainggai was sentenced to two years in prison as a political prisoner. He endured the harsh conditions of jail, and in 2004, he was released - a free man.

== The escape ==
After his release in 2004, he went straight back to his political activism with the knowledge that he could be killed. However, he refused to remain silent. He continued organizing protests, nonviolent workshops, which were mostly held in PNG near that border. By this time, he spoke English and was fluent in Tok Pisin. In 2005, with so many activists incarcerated, he feared that death was around the corner for him, or if arrested again he would spend all his life behind bars. After consulting with his family and supporters, he and forty other West Papuans, including children: two of them were his own twin sons two years old, and women, escaped to Australia on a home-made canoe. That canoe was large enough to carry more than forty people across the treacherous seas from West Papua all the way to Australia. They came ashore on Mapoon Island in Northern Australia and were taken to immigration facilities where they were kept for sometimes while the Australian government weighed its options.

== Diplomatic row ==
The Indonesian government's reaction was somewhat predictable. Indonesian immediately warned Australia over West Papuan asylum seekers. Indonesia vehemently demanding that they returned to Indonesian, and also threatened to sever ties with Australia. The Australian government, however, announced that it is the obligation of Australia under international laws to protect refugees who arrived on Australian shores. Living up to its words, the 43 refugees were processed and received "refugee status".

On March 24, 2006, the Australian government decided to grant temporary visas to the West Papuan refugees, giving them legal protective status to remain in Australia. Speaking to the reporters shortly after they received temporary visas, Mr. Wainggai told News media that the Australian government and the international community ought to look into the issues in West Papua earnestly, something that the Australian government had not done in a long time. He also told reporters that he himself saw his friends killed by the Indonesian military and did not want to suffer the same fate.

In response to the Australian government's decision to grant temporary protective visa to the West Papuan refugees, the Indonesian government recalled its ambassador to Australia, Nadjib Riphat Kesoema, marking the worst diplomatic row between Australia and Jakarta in years.

== Support in Australia ==
These refugees had received tremendous support from political leaders and NGOs within Australia who were quite informed about the flight and the danger West Papuans are facing in their country. The Green Party, in particular, called for support of these refugees citing the ongoing crisis in West Papua.

== Relocation to the United States of America ==
In 2009, three years after he led more than forty West Papuans and escape to Australia, Mr. Wainggai traveled to the United States to attend a conference on International Human Rights. He was invited to Boston, Massachusetts, to participate in workshops on the issue of nonviolence at The Fletcher School of Law and Diplomacy at Tuff University. He then moved to Washington, D.C, where he studied 'Conflict Analysis and Resolution' and became a "visiting scholar" at the George Mason University (GMU), Fairfax, Virginia. His trip to the United States marked an unusual but welcoming turn in his life. Mr. Wainggai continues his lobbying work at the US Congress and the United Nations on behalf of his people.

== External sources ==
- Herman Wainggai's personal site
- A Journey to Freedom website
- West Papuan media
