= Dabalorivhuwa Patriotic Front =

Political party in South Africa

- Leader: Tshifhiwa Makhale
- Founded: 1998
- Ideology: Vhavenda Self-determination
- International affiliation: Unrepresented Nations and Peoples Organization (Until 2015)

Party flag
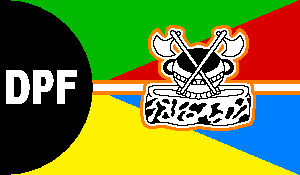

Dabalorivhuwa Patriotic Front (DPF) is a political party in South Africa. Based amongst the Vhavenda population in the north-eastern parts of the country and seeks self-determination for the Vhavenda. It was founded in 1998 by Tshifhiwa Makhale, who still leads the party. The DPF represented the Vhavenda at the Unrepresented Nations and Peoples Organization until 2015, and OEAS (Organization of Emerging African States).

== See also ==
- Venda – Former Bantustan in South Africa (1979–94)
