= World Sindhi Congress =

Organization advocating for autonomy of Sindh

- Seal of the organization
- Founded: 1988
- Type: Non-profit; NGO
- Location(s): Canada, US, and UK

World Sindhi Congress (abbreviated WSC, Sindhi: ورلڊ سنڌي ڪانگريس) is a human rights organizations for Sindhi people. WSC is a registered company in England and Wales and in the US, organized to carry out non-profit activities. The mission of World Sindhi Congress is to teach and disseminate educational material to the public, including material relating to Sindhi culture and literature, educate and advocate for the equitable enforcement of human rights and the right to self-determination in Pakistan through nonviolence.

== Advocacy Work ==
World Sindhi Congress organizes cultural events, rallies, seminars, and conferences around the world. These events include the annual conference on the situation of human rights in Sindh, and the annual celebration of the birth anniversary of G. M. Syed. WSC chapters also organize other cultural celebrations, including Sindhi cap and Arjak day, for members of the Sindhi Diaspora to connect with the community.

Members of World Sindhi Congress regularly meet and work with the United Nations to raise awareness of human rights violations in Sindh. Members have met with the UN Working Group on Enforced and Involuntary Disappearances to present cases of disappeared Sindhi political workers and activists, and work with the Unrepresented Nations and Peoples Organization to promote the right to self-determination for unrepresented people.

WSC also advocates the practice of forced conversions of religious minority girls and women in Sindh for the purpose of forced labor or forced marriages. Members also regularly organize non-violent rallies around the world to draw attention to human rights abuses committed in the province.

== Offices ==
World Sindhi Congress has chapters in Canada, the United Kingdom, and the United States. The executive committee and officers are dispersed globally, and work with organizers and volunteers to accomplish goals together.

== See also ==
- World Sindhi Institute
