= International Revelation Congress =

Political party in South Africa

- Women's League National President: Emily Masadi Teffu
- Founder: Thinawanga Mammba
- Founded: 2013
- Ideology: Social conservatism Social welfare
- National Assembly seats: 0 / 400
- Provincial Legislatures: 0 / 430

Website
- ircsa.org.za

International Revelation Congress (IRC) is a Limpopo-based South African political party formed in 2013.

The party merged with Agang to contest the 2014 general election. After the problems in that party, it contested the 2016 municipal elections, aiming to rescue the Thulamela Local Municipality and govern with traditional leaders. It finished seventh in the municipality in 2016, and fifth in 2021, winning one seat on both occasions.

The party is socially conservative, is against same-sex marriage and in favour of the right to administer corporal discipline to children. It is against land expropriation without compensation, and wants to replace Black Economic Empowerment with economic empowerment based on poverty rather than race.

The party also states that it would deport what it describes as "illegal foreigners".

The party contested the 2019 general election, failing to win any seats.

== Election results ==
=== National elections ===
Election	Total votes	Share of vote	Seats	+/–	Government
2019	4,247	0.02%	0 / 400	–	extraparliamentary

=== Provincial elections ===
Election	Eastern Cape		Free State		Gauteng		Kwazulu-Natal		Limpopo		Mpumalanga		North-West		Northern Cape		Western Cape	
Election	%	Seats	%	Seats	%	Seats	%	Seats	%	Seats	%	Seats	%	Seats	%	Seats	%	Seats
2019	0.02%	0/63	-	-	0.02%	0/73	-	-	0.12%	0/49	0.04%	0/30	0.03%	0/33	0.03%	0/30	-	-

=== Municipal elections ===
Election	Votes	%
2016	4,834	0.01%
2021	10,936	0.04%
