= Ximoko Party =

Political party in South Africa

- Founder: Hudson Ntsanwisi
- Founded: 1984
- Ideology: Under apartheid: Tsonga nationalism; Anti-communism; Authoritarianism; Pro-apartheid
- Political position: Under apartheid: Right-wing to far-right

The Ximoko Party is a minor political party in South Africa. It has no representation in the National Assembly or the provincial legislatures, but as of 2019 had 3 councillors at municipal level in Limpopo province.

== History ==
Formed as a cultural organisation in 1984 by Hudson Ntsanwisi, then prime minister of the Gazankulu bantustan, Ximoko transformed into a political party in 1990, still under Ntsanwisi's leadership.

After his death in 1993, some members of the party formed an alliance with the African National Congress (ANC), while others continued as the Ximoko Democratic Party, and contested the 1994 elections, still registered as the Ximoko Progressive Party. The party won no seats.

In 1996, the party reformed as the Ximoko Party and contested the 1999 elections in the then Northern Province (now Limpopo) only, again winning no seats. It has since only contested in Limpopo, failing to win any seats each time.

The party has also competed for a number of local government positions and as of 2025 has held a seat in the Collins Chabane Local Municipality since its formation in 2016.

== Election results ==
=== National elections ===
Election	Votes	%	Seats
1994	6,320	0.03	0

=== Provincial elections ===
Election	Limpopo	
Election	%	Seats
1994	0.10%	0/49
1999	0.80%	0/49
2004	0.59%	0/49
2009	0.23%	0/49
2014	0.21%	0/49
2019	0.08%	0/49

=== Municipal elections ===
Election	Votes	%
2016	7,556	0.02%
2021	4,835	0.02%
