= List of flags with Islamic symbolism =

This list exclusively includes the official flags of administrative bodies or territorial jurisdictions, representing current or former territories, states, counties, and provinces.

== List of national flags ==
- Flag of Afghanistan
- bears the Shahada,
one of the Five Pillars of Islam

- Flag of Algeria
- bears a star and crescent and the green represents Islam

- Flag of Azerbaijan
- the red band bears a star and crescent and the green represents Islam

- Flag of Bahrain
- has five points that represent the Five Pillars of Islam

- Flag of Brunei
- bears a crescent

- Flag of Comoros
- bears a star and crescent and the green represents Islam

- Flag of Iran
- the center emblem is a stylized form of the Arabic word Allah and its five parts represent the Five Pillars of Islam; the red and green bands bear the Takbir

- Flag of Iraq
- the white band bears the Takbir

- Flag of Jordan
- bears a seven-pointed star that represents the seven verses of the Quran's first chapter

- Flag of Libya
- the black band bears a star and crescent

- Flag of Malaysia
- bears a star and crescent

- Flag of Maldives
- bears a crescent

- Flag of Mauritania
- bears a star and crescent and the green represents Islam

- Flag of Morocco
- the green represents Islam and the pentagram's five points represent the Five Pillars of Islam

- Flag of Northern Cyprus
- bears a star and crescent

- Flag of Pakistan
- bears a star and crescent and the green represents the Muslim majority

- Flag of Saudi Arabia
- bears the Shahada and the green represents Islam

- Flag of Senegal
- the green represents Islam

- Flag of Singapore
- the Malay minority added a crescent moon to represent Islam.

- Flag of Sudan
- the green represents Islam

- Flag of Tunisia
- bears a star and crescent and the red represents Islam

- Flag of Turkey
- bears a star and crescent

- Flag of Turkmenistan
- bears a star and crescent

== List of subnational flags ==
- Flag of Johor, Malaysia
- bears a star and crescent

- Flag of Karakalpakstan, Uzbekistan
- bears a crescent

- Flag of Kedah, Malaysia
- bears a crescent

- Flag of Kelantan, Malaysia
- bears a star and crescent

- Flag of Kuala Lumpur, Malaysia
- bears a star and crescent

- Flag of Labuan, Malaysia
- bears a star and crescent

- Flag of Malacca, Malaysia
- bears a star and crescent

- Flag of Selangor, Malaysia
- bears a star and crescent

- Flag of Terengganu, Malaysia
- bears a star and crescent

== See also ==
- Religion in national symbols
- Religious symbolism
- List of flags with Christian symbolism
