= Green in Islam =

Significance of the colour green in Islam

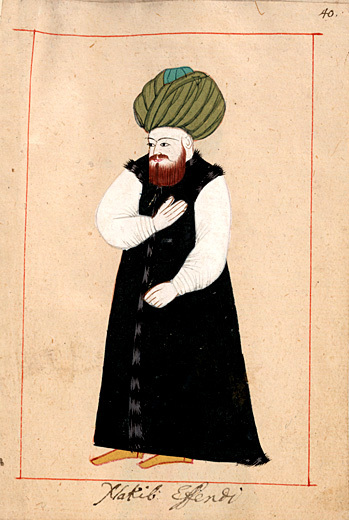
In the Ottoman Empire, the wearing of a green turban was a privilege afforded to the descendants of Muhammad (drawing by Claes Rålamb, 1657).

The color green holds a distinct significance in Islamic culture, as it has appeared with symbolic meanings throughout various Islamic eras and among different schools and sects. It is mentioned in the Quran, especially in the descriptions of Paradise, as stated in the verse: "They will wear green garments of fine silk and brocade" (Quran 18:31). It is also mentioned in a hadith that the Islamic prophet Muhammad wore two green garments, as narrated by Abu Rimthah: "He had locks hanging down as far as the lobes of the ears stained with henna, and he was wearing two green garments."

== Quran ==
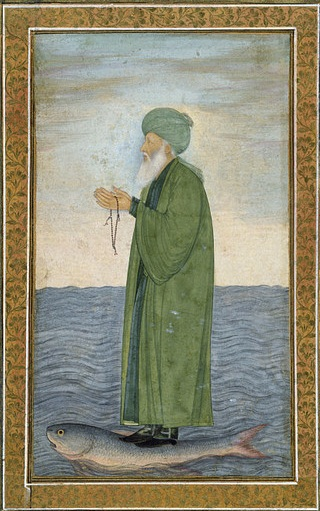
17th-century Mughal painting of al Khidr

Verses from the Qur'an describing reclining on green cushions and garments of fine silk imbue the color with a sense of tranquility and peace. Believers are adorned with green garments of fine silk and heavy brocade, symbolizing purity and divine favor.

Reclining on green Cushions and rich Carpets of beauty

— Sura 55, verse 76.

In *Surah al-Raḥmān* (chapter 55), the color green is mentioned more than once. God refers to the color implicitly in verse 64, where He describes the two gardens as “mudhāmmatān.” Al-ʿAllāmah al-Ṭabāṭabāʾī interprets *mudhāmmatān* as “deeply green,” meaning a shade so dark and rich that it nearly approaches black. In verse 76 of the same surah, he explains *rafraf khudr* as seating places covered with soft green silk fabric, symbolizing comfort and divine generosity.

Upon them will be green garments of fine silk and heavy brocade, and they will be adorned with bracelets of silver; and their Lord will give to them to drink of a Water Pure and Holy.

— Sura 76, verse 21.

Al-Khidr ("The Green One") is a Qur’anic figure who met and traveled with Moses.

The present Green Dome over the Prophet’s tomb was added in 1818 under the Ottoman sultan Mahmud II.

== Islamic flags ==
Green flags were adopted by Shi'ites in the early Islamic period, although the most common Shi'a color was white, in symbolic opposition to Abbasid black. Thus in 817, when the Abbasid caliph al-Ma'mun adopted the Alid Ali al-Ridha as his heir-apparent, he also changed the dynastic color from black to green. The change was reverted al-Ma'mun had Ali killed, and returned to Baghdad in 819.

Various national flags use green as a symbol of Islam, including Algeria, Azerbaijan, Comoros, Mauritania, Pakistan, Saudi Arabia, Sri Lanka, and Tajikistan. Some Arab countries also use pan-Arab colors, which include green. These include: Iraq, Jordan, Kuwait, Lebanon, Sudan, Syria, and the United Arab Emirates, as well as several contested states including Palestine, Somaliland, and Western Sahara. Libya formerly also followed this principle, featuring green as its only component color (at the time the only flag in the world to use only one color) until 2011.

There are also several flags of Muslim-majority countries featuring green color that does not symbolize Islam. Examples include Bangladesh, Turkmenistan, Uzbekistan, Guinea, Guinea-Bissau, Mali, and Senegal (in the latter four cases, the green color is a component of the pan-African colors, which are also adopted by even Christian-majority countries such as Malawi and South Sudan).

In Islam, the color green holds significant symbolism and is often associated with nature, life, and renewal. It is frequently referenced in religious texts and traditions, symbolizing paradise and the lush landscapes described in the Qur'an. Beyond its use in national flags of some Islamic countries, such as Saudi Arabia and Iran, green is widely utilized in Islamic art, architecture, and attire. Its prevalence in mosques, Qur'anic manuscripts, and decorative elements underscores its importance in Islamic culture and aesthetics.

Green is a common color used by Islamist political parties.

=== Gallery ===
A green Barbary corsairs flag with a skull on it.

The flag of Hayreddin Barbarossa

Flag of Saudi Arabia

Flag of Pakistan

Flag of Bangsamoro, Philippines

Flag of the Kingdom of Egypt and the Republic of Egypt (1922-1958)

Flag of the Great Socialist People's Libyan Arab Jamahiriya (1977–2011)

Flag of Mauritania (1959–2017)

Flag of al-Qassam Brigades

== See also ==
- Shades of green
- List of Shia Muslim flags
- Symbols of Islam
- Pan-Arab colors

== Sources ==
- Petersen, Andrew. Dictionary of Islamic Architecture. London and New York: Routledge, 2002. p. 184. Online version

== Bibliography ==
- ibn Hāshim, Abū al-Qāsim Muḥammad ibn ʿAbd Allāh ibn ʿAbd al-Muṭṭalib (2009), Quran The Final Testament, Khalifa, Rashad transl, Tucson: Majid
- Abdul-Matin, Ibrahim. “Green Deen: What Islam Teaches about Protecting the Planet.” Green Deen: What Islam Teaches about Protecting the Planet, Kube Publishing, 2012.
