= Symbols of Islam =

Calligraphic representation of the shahadah

Islam is an Abrahamic monotheistic religion teaching that there is only one God and that Muhammad is the last messenger of God. It is the world's second-largest religion, with over 2 billion followers (Muslims) comprising nearly a quarter of the world's population.

== Common iconography ==
Symbol	Image	History and usage
Crescent (Hilāl)		The crescent appears to have been adopted as an emblem on Islamic military flags from the medieval period, possibly in response to the Crusaders' cross. The Red Crescent has been used as a replacement of the Red Cross as early as in the Russo-Turkish War of 1877–1878 and was officially adopted in 1929. In Unicode: (U+263D ☽ FIRST QUARTER MOON)
Star and crescent		The star and crescent moon was commonly associated with the Ottoman Empire, and later came to commonly symbolize Islam, especially in the Western world before attaining Muslim connotations more universally. In Unicode: (U+262A ☪ STAR AND CRESCENT)
Allah		Means "God" in Arabic and used by Muslims worldwide irrespective of the language spoken. The word written in Islamic calligraphy is widely used as a symbol of Islam in the Muslim world. In Unicode: (U+FDF2 ﷲ ARABIC LIGATURE ALLAH ISOLATED FORM)
Shahadah		Parts of it are mentioned in the Quran separately, but never in its complete form. Used in hadiths and many historical Muslim and Islamist flags and emblems.
Rub el Hizb		The Rub el Hizb (Islamic Star) is used to facilitate recitation of the Quran. The symbol is also found on a number of emblems and flags especially the state of Fez during the Marinid Sultanate. In Unicode: (U+06DE ۞ ARABIC START OF RUB EL HIZB)
Khatim		Khatim symbol (Black Star) is known as the seal of Muhammad.
Sujud Tilawa		Used in the Quran to indicate when the reader should perform sujud, the act of low bowing or prostration in worship of God. In Unicode: (U+06E9 ۩ ARABIC PLACE OF SAJDAH)

== Colours ==
=== History ===
Early Islamic armies and caravans flew simple solid-coloured flags (generally black or white) for identification purposes, with the exception of the Young Eagle of Muḥammad, which had the shahada inscribed upon it. In later generations, the Muslim leaders continued to use a simple black, white, or green flag with no markings, writings, or symbolism on it. The Umayyads fought under white and green banners. The Abbasids chose black (blue) and fought with black banners. The Fatimids used a green standard, as well as white. The Saudi Emirate of Diriyah used a white and green flag with the shahadah emblazoned on it. Various countries in the Persian Gulf have red flags, as red represents nationalism. The four Pan-Arab colours, white, black, green and red, dominate the flags of Arab states.

=== Meanings ===
- Green – The silk and pillows of Jannah are believed to be green. Muhammad's favorite color was green.
- White – Considered the purest and cleanest color in Islam and the color of the flag of Muḥammad, the Young Eagle.
- Black – The color of Jahannam as well as the color of the Black Standard.

== Black Standard ==
The Black Standard flag

The Black Standard is one of the flags flown by Muhammad at times of war in Muslim tradition. It was historically used by Abu Muslim in his uprising leading to the Abbasid Revolution in 747 and is also associated with the Abbasid Caliphate. It is also a symbol and is associated with Islamic eschatology (heralding the advent of the Mahdi). (Note: The set of aḥādīth which refer to "the black banners from the East" as the sign of the Mahdi were graded ḍaʿīf (weak). Bahari and Hassan 2014, pp. 1–6) The Black Banner is different from the flag used by the Islamic State. Scholars have interpreted the Islamic State's use of a similar black flag in attempts to their claim to re-establishing a Caliphate.

== Other symbols ==
=== Star and crescent ===
The Ottoman flag

The crescent is usually associated with Islam and regarded as its symbol. The crescent and star had been used in the coinage of the Sassanid Persian Empire. The Umayyad Caliphate, after the Rashidun Caliphate's conquest of the region, continue to use similar coins with some modification but leaving the star and crescent intact. However, the symbol only came into widespread use after it was associated with the Ottoman Empire, who took it from being the symbol of Constantinople after their takeover of the city. By extension from the use in Ottoman lands, it became a symbol also for Islam as a whole, as well as representative of western Orientalism. "Crescent and Star" was used as a metaphor for the rule of the Islamic empires (Ottoman and Persian) in the late 19th century in British literature. This association was apparently strengthened by the increasingly ubiquitous fashion of using the crescent and star symbol in the ornamentation of Ottoman mosques and minarets. By contrast, the majority of religious Islamic publications emphasize that the crescent is rejected "by some Muslim scholars". The "Red Crescent" emblem was adopted by volunteers of the International Committee of the Red Cross (ICRC) as early as 1877 during the Russo-Turkish War; it was officially adopted in 1929.

After the collapse of the Ottoman Empire in 1922, the crescent and star was used in several national flags adopted by its successor states. In 1947, after the independence of Pakistan, flag of Pakistan was white crescent and star with a green background. The crescent and star in the flag of the Kingdom of Libya (1951) was explicitly given an Islamic interpretation by associating it with "the story of Hijra (migration) of our Prophet Mohammed" By the 1950s, this symbolism was embraced by movements of Arab nationalism such as the proposed Arab Islamic Republic (1974).

=== Lion and Sun ===
The Lion and Sun symbol consists of a male lion in front of a rising sun, coloured in gold and centred on the white band. Its appearance has varied over time. In some versions, the lion holds a sword, while in others it stands unarmed, with all four paws on the ground. The sun is nowadays depicted as a simple disc with rays, though earlier designs often included a face. Some versions include a thin horizontal base beneath the lion. While associated with the former monarchy of Iran, the symbol is well represented in Shia Islam and was first adopted during the Safavid era when the country adopted Twelver Shi'ism as their state religion in 1501. The lion represented the first Shia Imam Ali, the son in law of the Islamic prophet Muhammad, embodied his recognized bravery, strength, and justice; while the sun represented divine light, prophecy, and royalty.

=== Rub el Hizb ===
The Rub el Hizb is used to facilitate recitation of the Quran. The symbol determines every quarter of Hizb, while the Hizb is one half of a juz'. The symbol is also found on a number of emblems and flags, such as that of the Marinid Sultanate. It was used extensively by the Seljuqs and is also called the Seljuk Star.

=== Khatim ===
Seal of the Prophets (Khatim) a title used in the Qur'an and by Muslims to designate Muhammad as the last of the prophets sent by God.

=== Shahadah ===
La ilaha illallah, Muhammadun rasulullah (English translation: "There is no god but Allah and Muhammad is Allah’s messenger"). White background with Shahadah written in Islamic calligraphy is currently used as the present-day flag of Afghanistan and its ruling Taliban organisation.

Shahadah is one of the Five Pillars of Islam and part of the Adhan. It reads: "I bear witness that none deserves worship except God, and I bear witness that Muhammad is the messenger of God."

Religious flags with inscriptions were in use in the medieval period, as shown in miniatures by 13th-century illustrator Yahya ibn Mahmud al-Wasiti. 14th-century illustrations of the History of the Tatars by Hayton of Corycus (1243) shows both Mongols and Seljuqs using a variety of war ensigns.

== The symbolic values of numbers ==
- The number 1 symbolizes the Shahada of Muslims: "There is no god but Allah and Muhammad is the messenger of Allah."
- The number 3 is also significant as many sunnah acts are advised to be done in three's.
- The number 4 is a very important number in Islam with many significations: Eid-al-Adha lasts for four days from the 10th to the 14th of Dhul Hijja; there were four Caliphs; there were four Archangels; there are four months in which war is not permitted in Islam; when a woman's husband dies she is to wait for four months and ten days; the Rub el Hizb is composed of quadrilaterals.
- The number 6 represents the six days it took for Allah to create the universe
- The number 8 in Islam symbolizes the eight angels that carry the throne of Allah in Jannah.
- The number 19 represents the 19 angels that will enforce the punishments of Jahannam.

== See also ==
- Islamic flags
- List of flags with Islamic symbolism
