= List of Shia Muslim flags =

This is a list of flags used by Shia Muslims.

Shia Muslim flags usually include the color green in them, which is a symbol of Islam, and also a symbol of purity, fertility and peace. Common colors in Shia Muslims flags are red, white and green; common symbols include the Lion and Sun, the Zulfiqar and the Shahada.

== Shia Muslim states ==
Flag	Duration	Use	Description
		Flag of Fatimid Caliphate	The Fatimid dynastic color was white, in opposition to Abbasid black, while red and yellow banners were associated with the Fatimid caliph's person.
		Flag of Kingdom of Yemen	Mutawakkilite Kingdom of Yemen (1918–1923)
		Flag of Kingdom of Yemen	Mutawakkilite Kingdom of Yemen (1923–1927)
		Flag of Kingdom of Yemen	Mutawakkilite Kingdom of Yemen (1927–1962)
		Flag of Alawite State under the French Occupation	1920–1936, Alawite Territory, Alawite State, and Sanjak of Latakia
		Flag of Safavid Iran	Flag of Safavid Iran after Ismail II (1576–1732).
		Flag of Afsharid Iran	
		Flag of Afsharid Iran	
		Flag of Afsharid Iran	An Imperial Standard of Afsharid Iran
		Flag of Afsharid Iran	Another Imperial Standard of the Afsharid dynasty
		Flag of Afsharid Iran	Nader Shah's flag
		Flag of Afsharid Iran	Naval flag of Afsharid Iran
		Flag of Zand Iran	An Imperial Standard of the Zand dynasty
		Flag of Zand Iran	Another Imperial Standard of the Zand dynasty
		Flag of Qajar Iran	
		Flag of Qajar Iran	Flag of Agha Mohammad Khan
		Flag of Qajar Iran	War flag of Fat′h Ali Shah
		Flag of Qajar Iran	Peace flag of Fat′h Ali Shah (version with sword)
		Flag of Qajar Iran	Diplomatic flag of Fat′h Ali Shah
		Flag of Qajar Iran	Flag used during the reign of Mohammad Shah
		Flag of Qajar Iran	Tricolour flag reported in 1886
		Flag of Qajar Iran	Tricolour flag designed by Amir Kabir
		Flag of Qajar Iran	Civil ensign until 1906
		Flag of Qajar Iran	Naval ensign until 1906
		Flag of Qajar Iran	Qajar Flag during the late 19th and early 20th centuries.
		Flag of Qajar Iran	
		Flag of Pahlavi Iran	State flag (1907–1933)
		Flag of Pahlavi Iran	National flag (1907–1933)
		Flag of Pahlavi Iran	Naval ensign (1907–1933)
		Flag of Pahlavi Iran	State flag (1933–1964)
		Flag of Pahlavi Iran	Naval ensign (1933–1964)
		Flag of Pahlavi Iran	State flag (1964–1980)
		Flag of Pahlavi Iran	National flag (1964–1980)
		Flag of Pahlavi Iran	Naval ensign (1964–1979)
		Flag of Pahlavi Iran	Naval ensign (1979–1980)
		Flag of Iran	
		Flag of Azerbaijan	
		Flag of Iraq	
		Flag of Nawab of Awadh	
		Flag of Nawab of Rampur	

== Internal Shia Muslim territories ==
Flag	Duration	Use	Description
		Flag of Hunza (Pakistan)	
		Flag of Talysh-Mughan Autonomous Republic	
		Flag of Nakhchivan Autonomous Republic	

== Shia organizations ==
Flag	Duration	Use	Description
		Flag of Amal Movement	
		Flag of Khoddam Al-Mahdi	
		Flag of Nizari Isma'ilism	
		Flag of Balawaristan National Front	
		Flag of Shabaks	
		Flag of Kata'ib Hezbollah	

== See also ==
- Lion and Sun
- Order of the Lion and the Sun
