= Star and crescent =

Symbol

Green star and crescent symbol, commonly used as a symbol of Islam

Ancient design of the star and crescent symbol as used in Byzantium in the 1st century BC

The conjoined representation of a star and a crescent is used in various historical contexts, including as a prominent symbol of the Ottoman Empire, and in contemporary times, as a national symbol by some countries, and by some Muslims as a symbol of Islam, while other Muslims reject its use as an Islamic symbol. It was developed in the Greek colony of Byzantium ca. 300 BC, though it became more widely used as the royal emblem of Pontic king Mithridates VI Eupator after he incorporated Byzantium into his kingdom for a short period. During the 5th century, it was present in coins minted by the Persian Sassanian Empire; the symbol was represented in the coins minted across the empire throughout the Middle East for more than 400 years from the 3rd century until the fall of the Sassanians after the Muslim conquest of Persia in the 7th century. The conquering Muslim rulers kept the symbol in their coinage during the early years of the caliphate, as the coins were exact replicas of the Sassanian coins.

Both elements of the symbol have a long history in the iconography of the Ancient Near East as representing either the Sun and Moon or the Moon and Venus (Morning Star) (or their divine personifications). It has been suggested that the crescent actually represents the Sun during an eclipse. Coins with star and crescent symbols represented separately have a longer history, with possible ties to older Mesopotamian iconography. The star, or Sun, is often shown within the arc of the crescent (also called star in crescent, or star within crescent, for disambiguation of depictions of a star and a crescent side by side). In numismatics in particular, the term pellet within crescent is used in cases where the star is simplified to a single dot.

The combination is found comparatively rarely in late medieval and early modern heraldry. It rose to prominence with its adoption as the flag and national symbol of the Ottoman Empire and some of its administrative divisions (eyalets and vilayets) and later in the 19th-century Westernizing tanzimat (reforms). The Ottoman flag of 1844, with a white ay-yıldız (Turkish for "crescent-star") on a red background, continues in use as the flag of the Republic of Turkey, with minor modifications. Other states formerly part of the Ottoman Empire also used the symbol, including Libya (1951–1969 and after 2011), Tunisia (1831) and Algeria (1958). The same symbol was used in other national flags introduced during the 20th century, including the flags of Kazakhstan (1917), Azerbaijan (1918), Pakistan (1947), Malaysia (1948), Singapore (1959), Mauritania (1959), Uzbekistan (1991), Turkmenistan (1991) and Comoros (2001). In the latter 20th century, the star and crescent have acquired a popular interpretation as a "symbol of Islam", occasionally embraced by Arab nationalism or Islamism in the 1970s to 1980s but often rejected as erroneous or unfounded by Muslim commentators in more recent times. Unlike the cross, which is a symbol of Jesus' crucifixion in Christianity, there is no solid link that connects the star and crescent symbol with the concept of Islam. The connotation is widely believed to have come from the flag of the Ottoman Empire, whose prestige as an Islamic empire and caliphate led to the adoption of its state emblem as a symbol of Islam by association.

== History ==
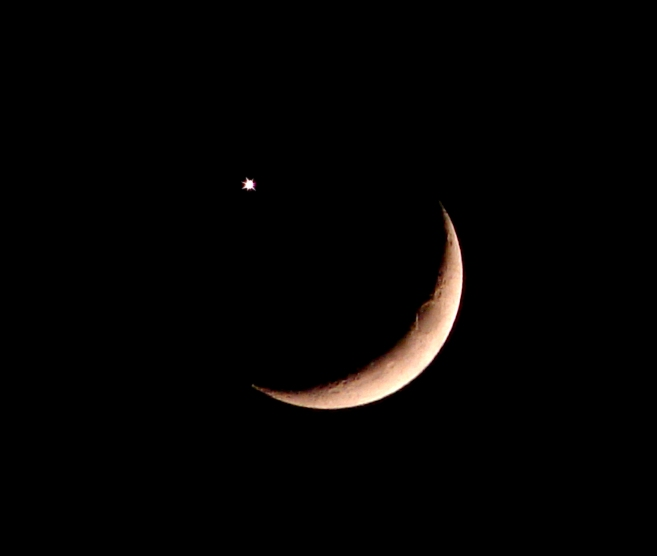
The natural phenomenon of a conjunction of the crescent Moon and, in this case, Venus; respectively the second and third brightest natural objects in Earth's sky

=== Origins and predecessors ===
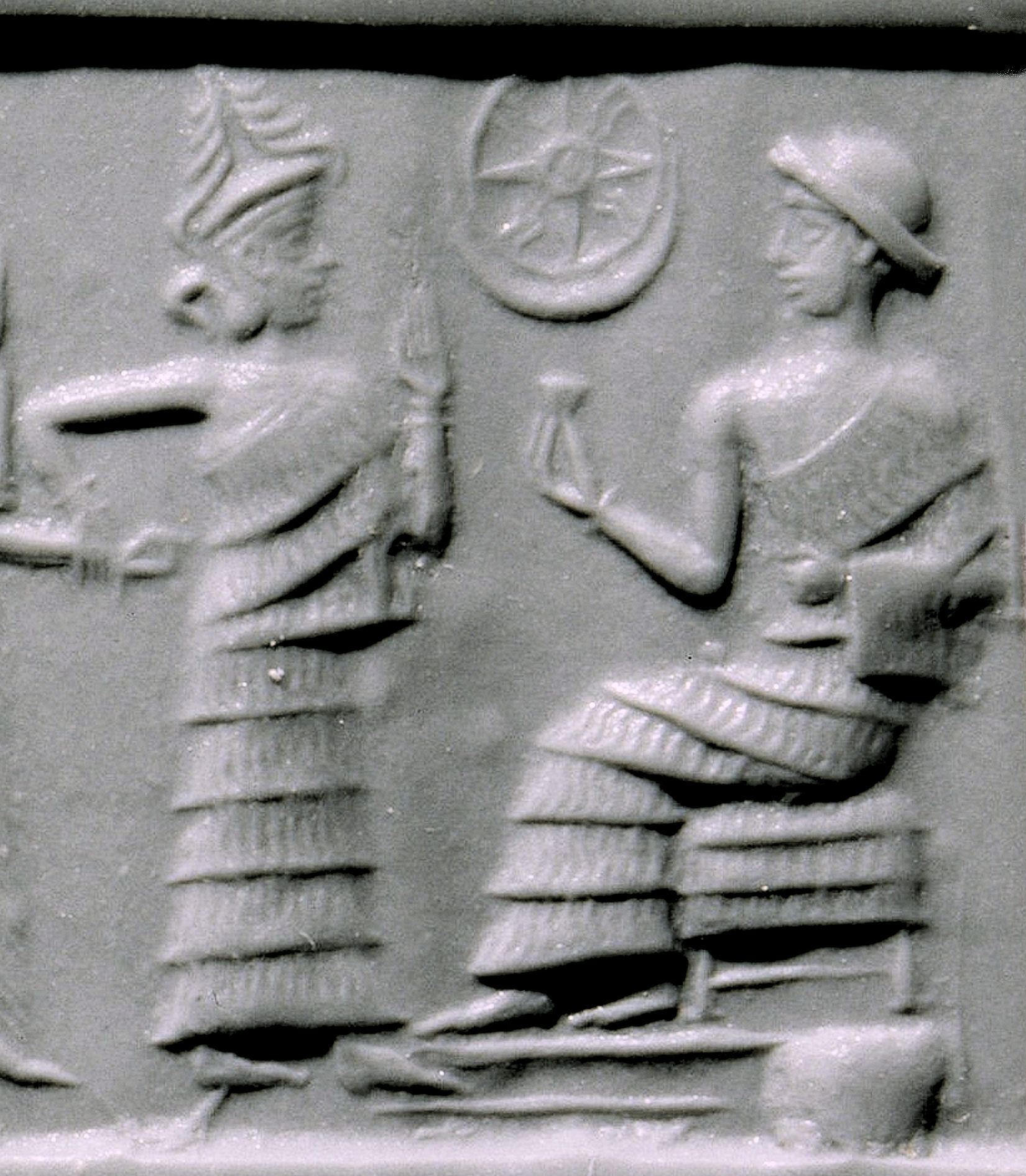
Sealing depicting the Neo Sumerian King, Ibbi-Sin seated with a star or Dingir and crescent adjacent to him

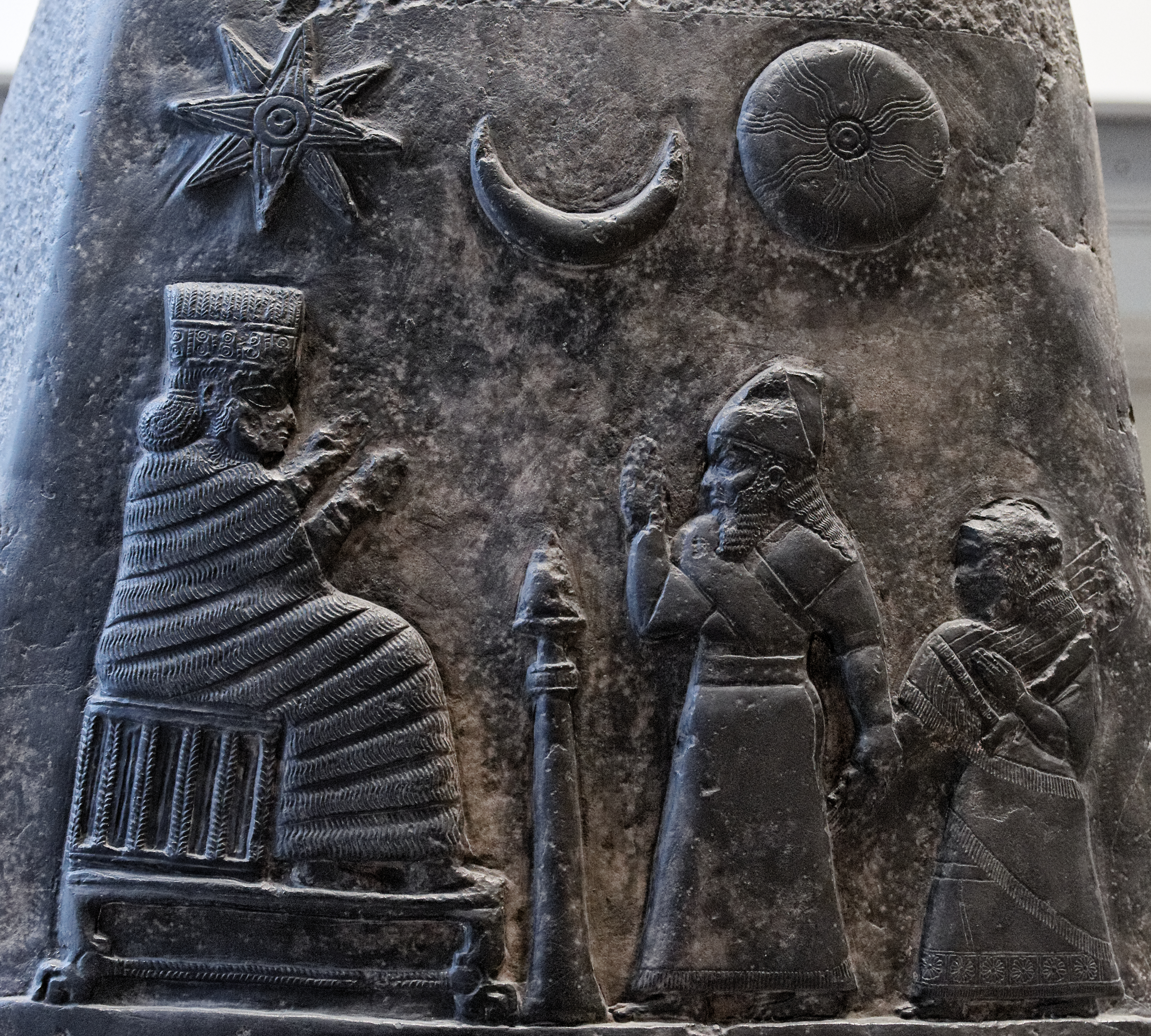
Depiction of the emblems of Ishtar (Venus), Sin (Moon), and Shamash (Sun) on a boundary stone of Meli-Shipak II (12th century BC)

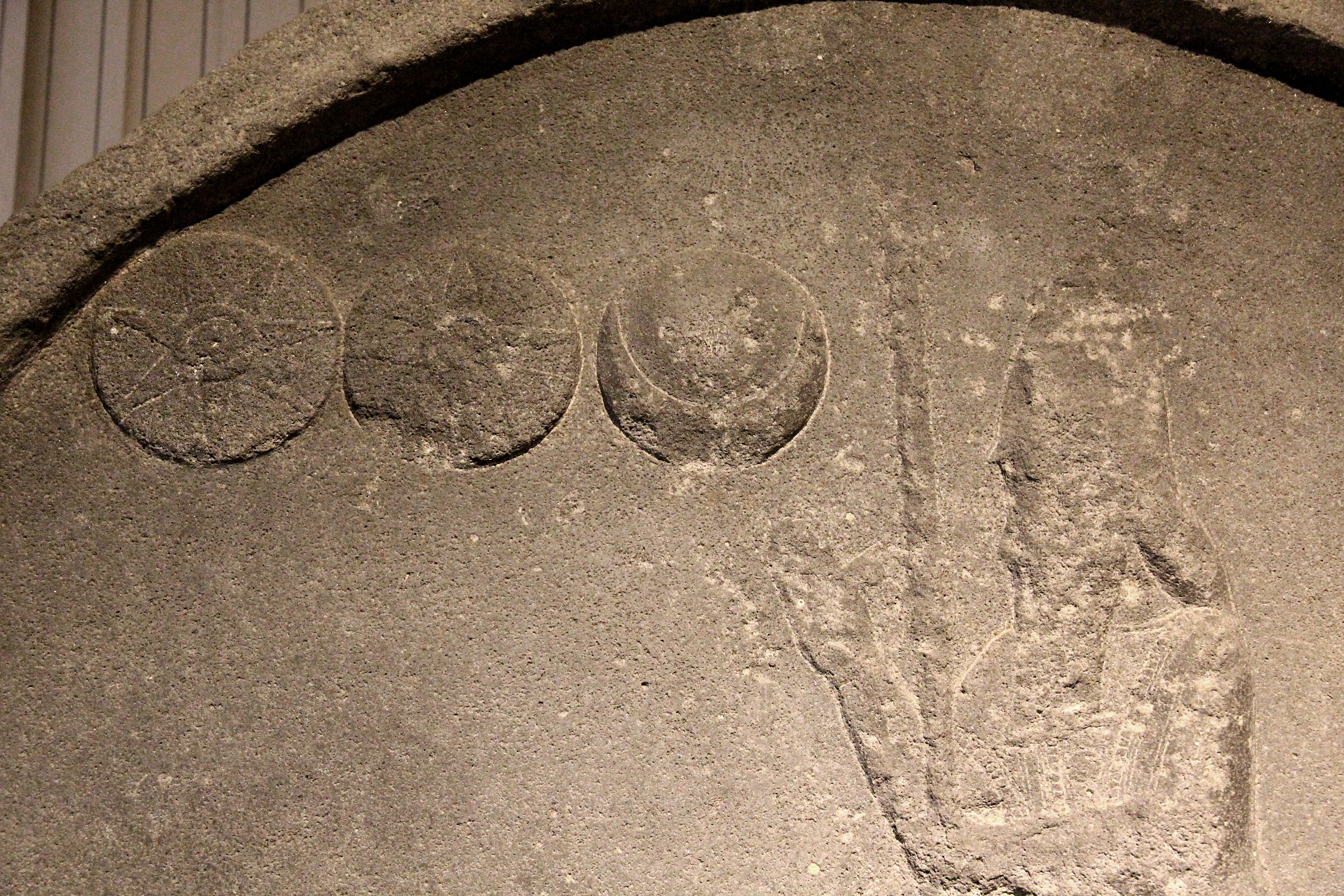
Venus, Sun and Moon on the Stele of Nabonidus (r. 556–539 BC) found at Harran (Şanlıurfa Museum)

Crescents appearing together with a star or stars are a common feature of Sumerian iconography, the crescent usually being associated with the moon god Sin (Nanna) and the star with Ishtar (Inanna, i.e. Venus), often placed alongside the sun disk of Shamash.

In Late Bronze Age Canaan, star and crescent moon motifs are also found on Moabite name seals.

The Egyptian hieroglyphs representing "moon" (N11 N11) and "star" (N14 N14) appear in ligature, forming a star-and-crescent shape N11 N14, as a determiner for the word for "month", ꜣbd.

The depiction of the "star and crescent" or "star inside crescent" as it would later develop in Bosporan Kingdom is difficult to trace to Mesopotamian art. Exceptionally, a combination of the crescent of Sin with the five-pointed star of Ishtar, with the star placed inside the crescent as in the later Hellenistic-era symbol, placed among numerous other symbols, is found in a boundary stone of Nebuchadnezzar I (12th century BC; found in Nippur by John Henry Haynes in 1896). An example of such an arrangement is also found in the (highly speculative) reconstruction of a fragmentary stele of Ur-Nammu (Third Dynasty of Ur) discovered in the 1920s.

A very early depiction of the symbol (crescent moon, stars and sun disc) is found on the Nebra sky disc, dating from c. 1800 – c. 1600 BC (Nebra, Germany). A gold signet ring from Mycenae dating from the 15th century BC also shows the symbol. The star and crescent (or 'crescent and pellet') symbol appears 19 times on the Berlin Gold Hat, dating from c. 1000 BC.

=== Classical antiquity ===
==== Greeks and Romans ====
Many ancient Greek (classical and hellenistic) and Roman amulets which depict stars and crescent have been found.

Mithradates VI Eupator of Pontus (r. 120–63 BC) used an eight rayed star with a crescent moon as his emblem. McGing (1986) notes the association of the star and crescent with Mithradates VI, discussing its appearance on his coins, and its survival in the coins of the Bosporan Kingdom where "[t]he star and crescent appear on Pontic royal coins from the time of Mithradates III and seem to have had oriental significance as a dynastic badge of the Mithridatic family, or the arms of the country of Pontus." Several possible interpretations of the emblem have been proposed. In most of these, the "star" is taken to represent the Sun. The combination of the two symbols has been taken as representing Sun and Moon (and by extension Day and Night), the Zoroastrian Mah and Mithra, or deities arising from Greek-Anatolian-Iranian syncretism, the crescent representing Mēn Pharnakou (Μήν Φαρνακου, the local moon god) and the "star" (Sun) representing Ahuramazda (in interpretatio graeca called Zeus Stratios)

By the late Hellenistic or early Roman period, the star and crescent motif had been associated to some degree with Byzantium. If any goddess had a connection with the walls in the city, it was Hecate, who had a cult in Byzantium from the time of its founding. Like Byzas in one legend, she had her origins in Thrace. Hecate was considered the patron goddess of Byzantium because she was said to have saved the city from an attack by Philip of Macedon in 340 BC by the appearance of a bright light in the sky. To commemorate the event the Byzantines erected a statue of the goddess known as the Lampadephoros ("torch-bearer" or "torch-bringer").

Some Byzantine coins of the 1st century BC and later show the head of Artemis with bow and quiver, and feature a crescent with what appears to be a six-rayed star on the reverse.

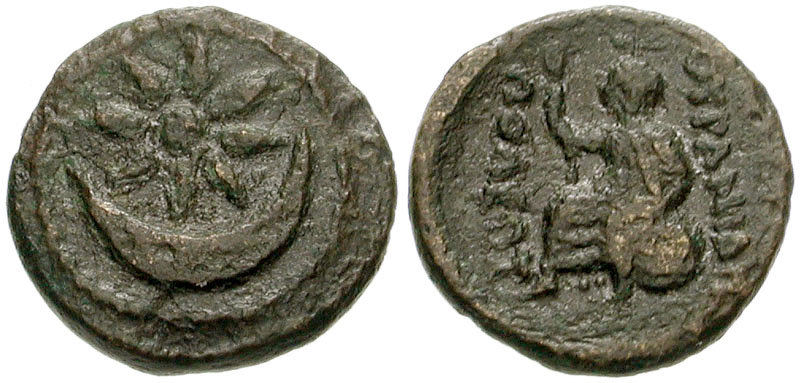
Star and crescent on a coin of Uranopolis, Macedon, ca. 300 BC (see also Argead star).

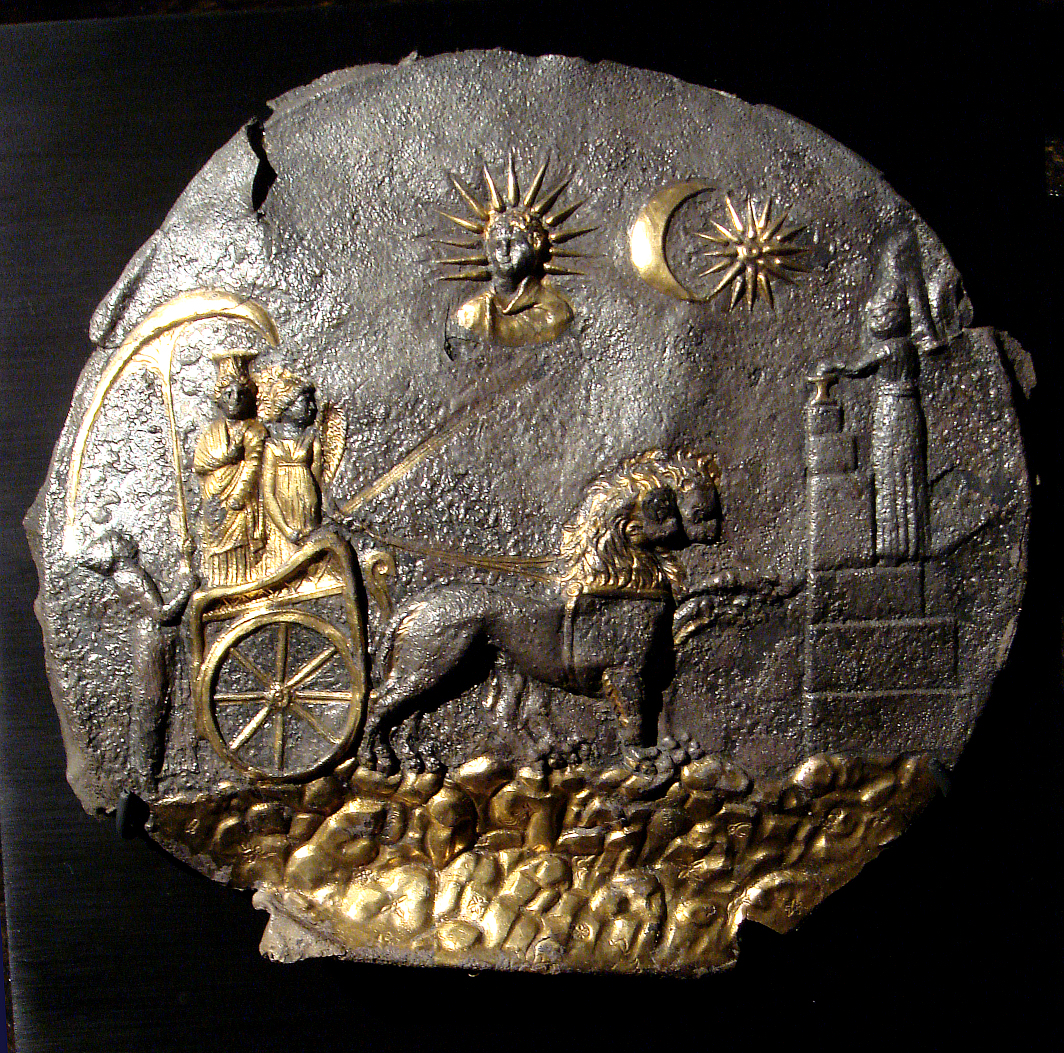
A star and crescent symbol with the star shown in a sixteen-rayed "sunburst" design (3rd century BC) on the Ai-Khanoum plaque.

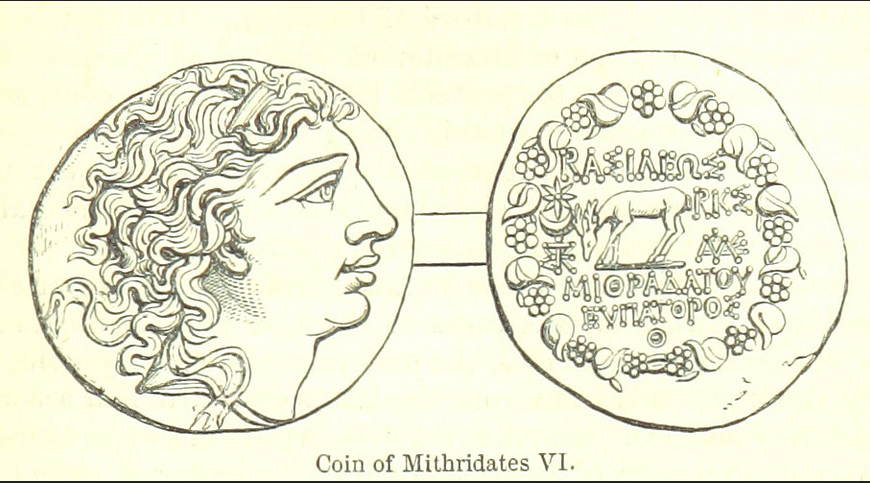
Coin of Mithradates VI Eupator. The obverse side has the inscription ΒΑΣΙΛΕΩΣ ΜΙΘΡΑΔΑΤΟΥ ΕΥΠΑΤΟΡΟΣ with a stag feeding, with the star and crescent and monogram of Pergamum placed near the stag's head, all in an ivy-wreath.

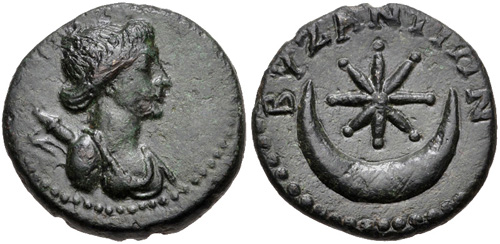
Roman-era coin with Greek inscription (1st century AD) with a bust of Artemis on the obverse and an eight-rayed star within a crescent on the reverse side.

The moon-goddess Selene is commonly depicted with a crescent moon, often accompanied by two stars (the stars represent Phosphorus, the morning star, and Hesperus, the evening star); sometimes, instead of a crescent, a lunar disc is used. Often a crescent moon rests on her brow, or the cusps of a crescent moon protrude, horn-like, from her head, or from behind her head or shoulders.

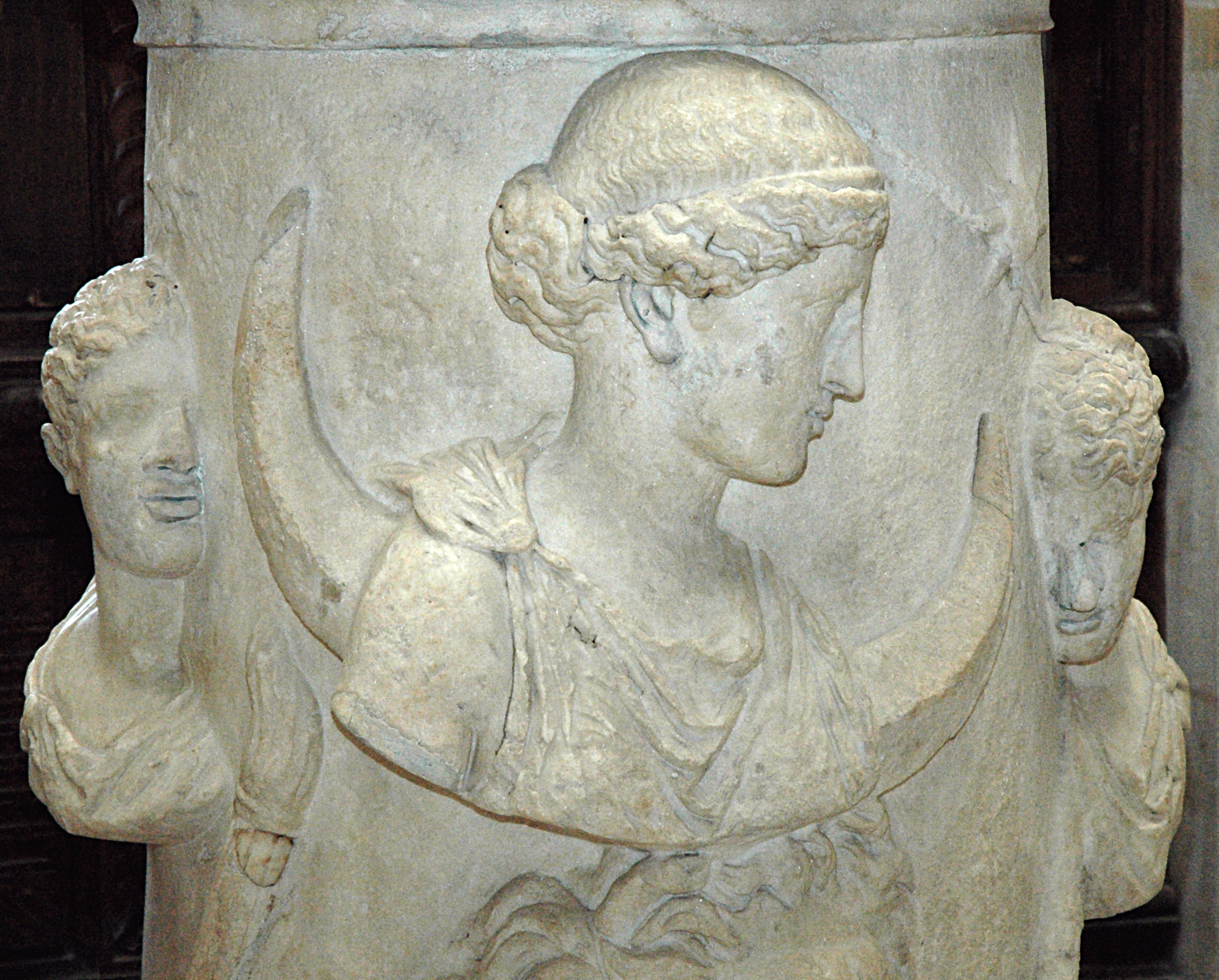
The Moon-goddess Selene or Luna accompanied by the Dioscuri, or Phosphoros (the Morning Star) and Hesperos (the Evening Star). Marble altar, Roman artwork, 2nd century AD. From Italy.

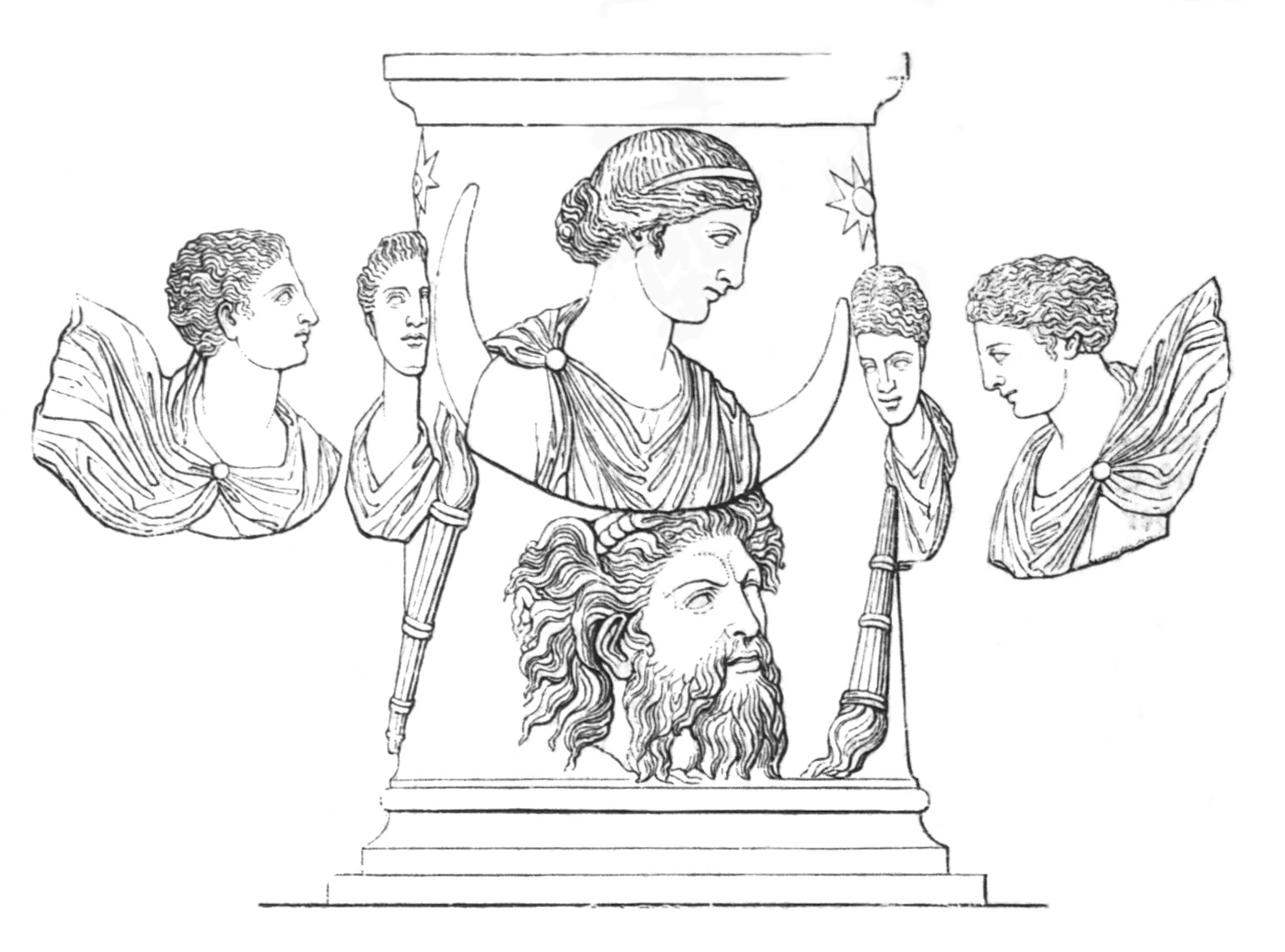
The goddess Selene, illustration from Meyers Lexikon, 1890

In the 2nd century, the star-within-crescent is found on the obverse side of Roman coins minted during the rule of Hadrian, Geta, Caracalla and Septimius Severus, in some cases as part of an arrangement of a crescent and seven stars, one or several of which were placed inside the crescent.

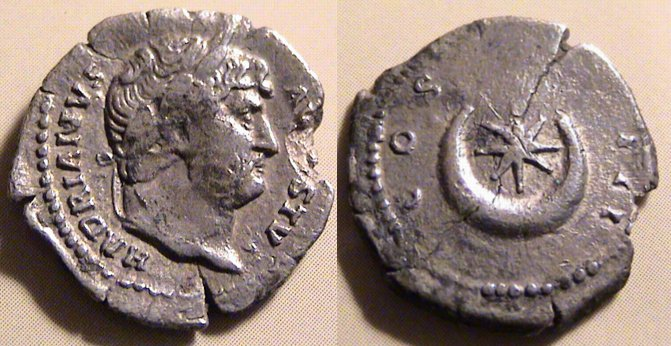
Coin of Roman Emperor Hadrian (r. 117–138). The reverse shows an eight-rayed star within a crescent.

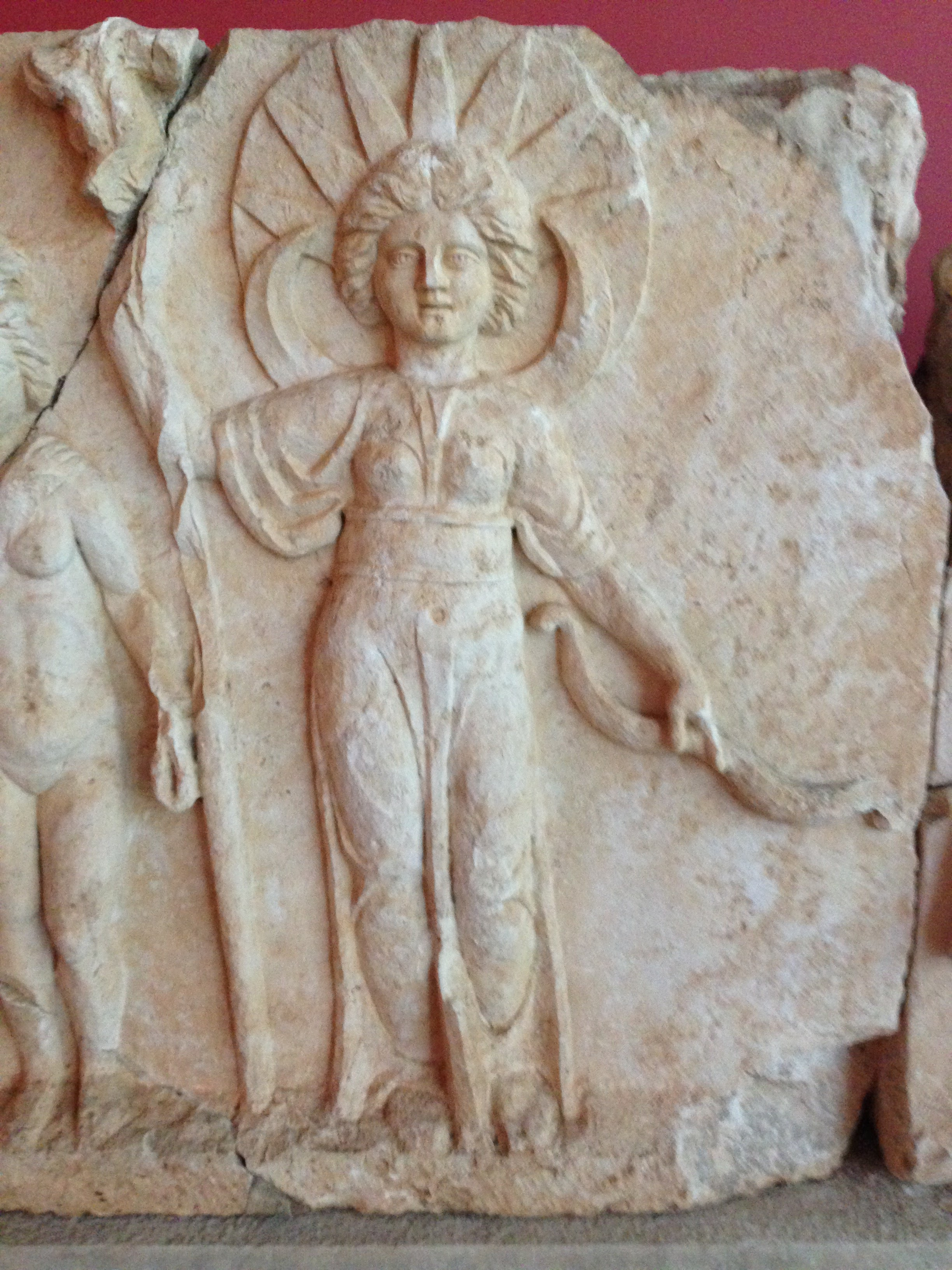
Roman period limestone pediment from Perge, Turkey (Antalya Museum) showing Diana-Artemis with a crescent and a radiant crown.

Because of Hecate, the crescent was an official symbol of Byzantium at the time of its conquering in 324 by Constantine, who is said to have added a star to symbolize the Virgin Mary. Thus, for many centuries thereafter, via Constantinople, the star and crescent was a Christian symbol until the later repurposing by Muslims.

==== Iran (Persia) ====
The star and crescent symbol appears on some coins of the Parthian vassal kingdom of Elymais in the late 1st century AD. The same symbol is present in coins that are possibly associated with Orodes I of Parthia (1st century BC). In the 2nd century AD, some Parthian coins show a simplified "pellet within crescent" symbol.

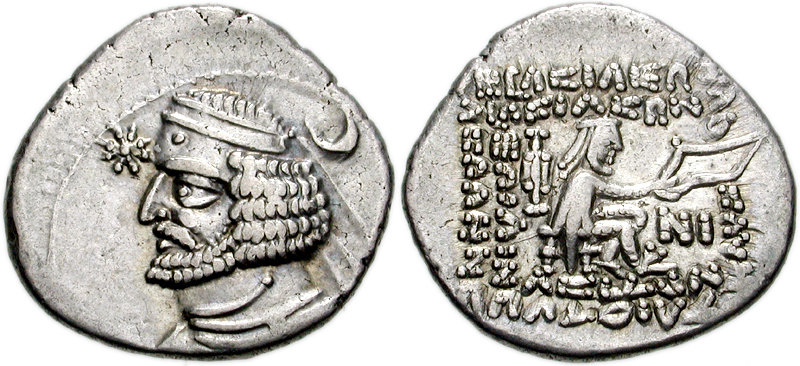
A star and crescent appearing (separately) on the obverse side of a coin of Orodes II of Parthia (r. 57–37 BC).

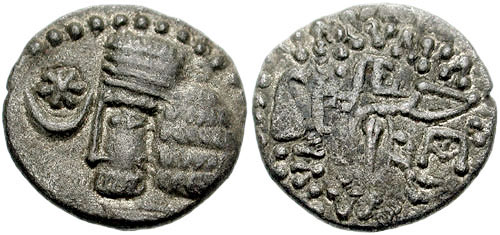
Coin of Vardanes I of Parthia (r. c. AD 40–45)
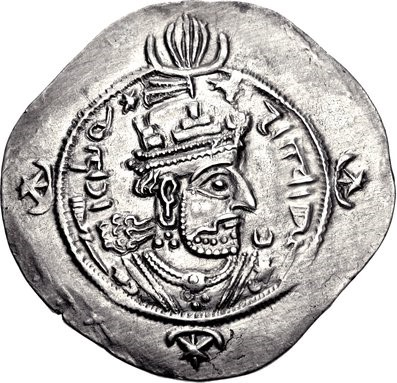
Coin of the Sasanian king Kavad II, minted at Susa in 628

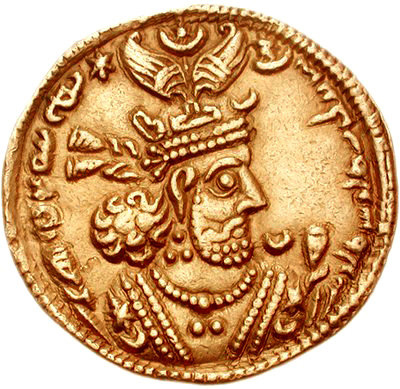
Gold coin of Khosrow II (r. 570–628).

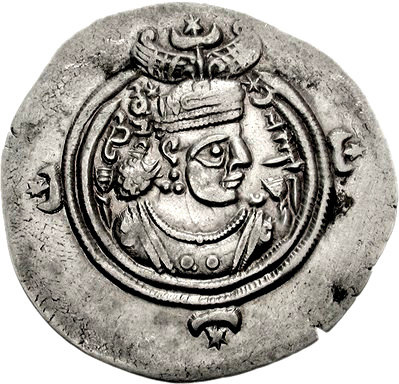
Coin of Khosrow III

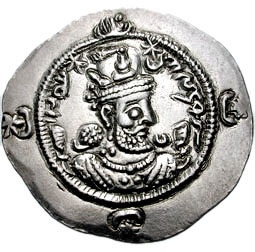
Coin of Hormizd IV

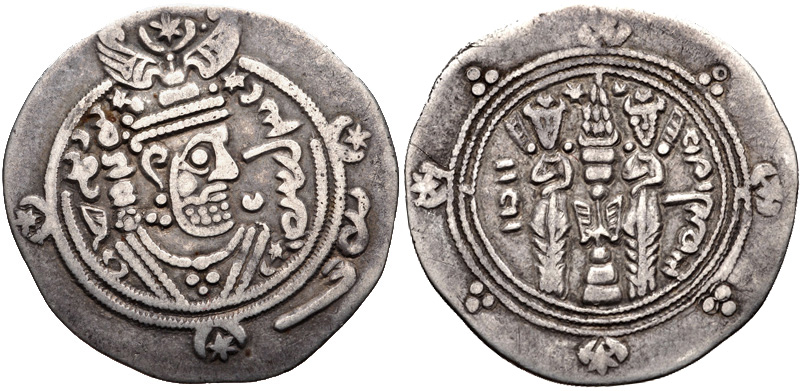
Silver dirham issued by Ispahbudh Khurshid of Tabaristan

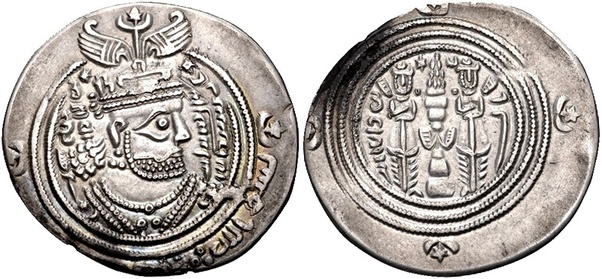
Arab-Sassanian coin was issued, which was added with arabic writing by the Umayyads

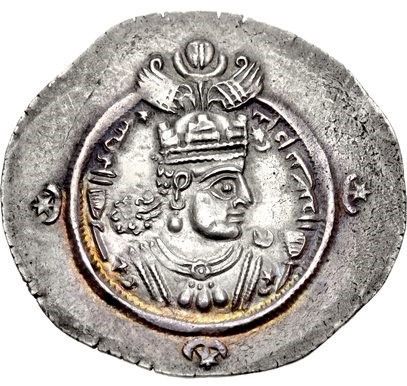
Sassanian coin issued by Ardashir III

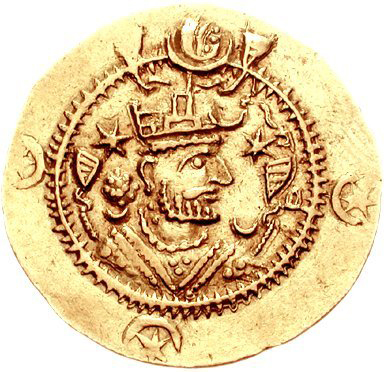
A coin of Sassanid king Kavadh I during his second reign (r. 488–531). Kavadh was the first Sassanid ruler to introduce star-and-crescent motifs as decorations on the margin of the obverse side of his coins. Note the continued use of the star and the crescent appearing on either side of the king's head.

The star and crescent motif appears on the margin of Sassanid coins in the 5th century. Sassanid rulers also appear to have used crowns featuring a crescent, sphere and crescent, or star and crescent.

Use of the star-and-crescent combination apparently goes back to the earlier appearance of a star and a crescent on Parthian coins, first under King Orodes II (1st century BC). In these coins, the two symbols occur separately, on either side of the king's head, and not yet in their combined star-and-crescent form. Such coins are also found further afield in Greater Persia, by the end of the 1st century AD in a coin issued by the Western Satraps ruler Chashtana. This arrangement is likely inherited from its Ancient Near Eastern predecessors; the star and crescent symbols are not frequently found in Achaemenid iconography, but they are present in some cylinder seals of the Achaemenid era.

Ayatollahi (2003) attempts to connect the modern adoption as an "Islamic symbol" to Sassanid coins remaining in circulation after the Islamic conquest which is an analysis that stands in stark contrast to established consensus that there is no evidence for any connection of the symbol with Islam or the Ottomans prior to its adoption in Ottoman flags in the late 18th century.

==== Western Turkic Khaganate ====
Coins from the Western Turkic Khaganate had a crescent moon and a star, which held an important place in the worldview of ancient Turks and other peoples of Central Asia.

=== Medieval and early modern ===
==== Christian and classical heraldric usage ====
The crescent on its own is used in western heraldry from at least the 13th century, while the star and crescent (or "Sun and Moon") emblem is in use in medieval seals at least from the late 12th century. The crescent in pellet symbol is used in Crusader coins of the 12th century, in some cases duplicated in the four corners of a cross, as a variant of the cross-and-crosslets ("Jerusalem cross"). Many Crusader seals and coins show the crescent and the star (or blazing Sun) on either side of the ruler's head (as in the Sassanid tradition), e.g. Bohemond III of Antioch, Richard I of England, Raymond VI, Count of Toulouse. At the same time, the star in crescent is found on the obverse of Crusader coins, e.g. in coins of the County of Tripoli minted under Raymond II or III c. 1140s–1160s show an "eight-rayed star with pellets above crescent".

The star and crescent combination appears in attributed arms from the early 14th century, possibly in a coat of arms of c. 1330, possibly attributed to John Chrysostom, and in the Wernigeroder Wappenbuch (late 15th century) attributed to one of the three Magi, named "Balthasar of Tarsus".

Crescents (without the star) increase in popularity in early modern heraldry in Europe. Siebmachers Wappenbuch (1605) records 48 coats of arms of German families which include one or several crescents.

A star and crescent symbolizing Croatia was commonly found on 13th-century banovac coins in the Kingdom of Slavonia, with a two-barred cross symbolizing the Kingdom of Hungary.

St. Stephen's Cathedral in Vienna used to have at the top of its highest tower a golden crescent with a star; it came to be seen as a symbol of Islam and the Ottoman enemy, which is why it was replaced with a cross in 1686.

In the late 16th century, the Korenić-Neorić Armorial shows a white star and crescent on a red field as the coat of arms of "Illyria".

The star and crescent combination remains rare prior to its adoption by the Ottoman Empire in the second half of the 18th century.

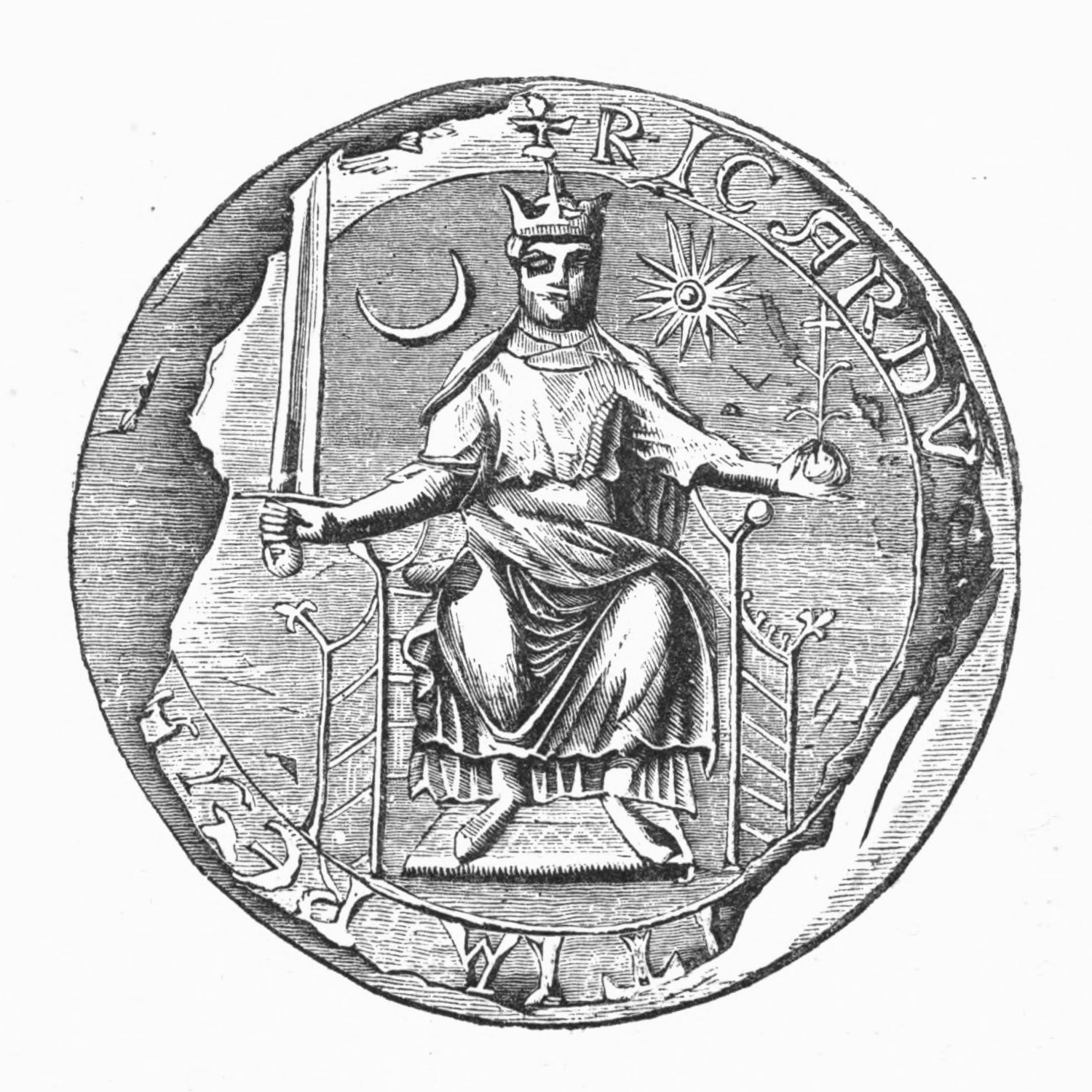
Great Seal of Richard I of England (1198)

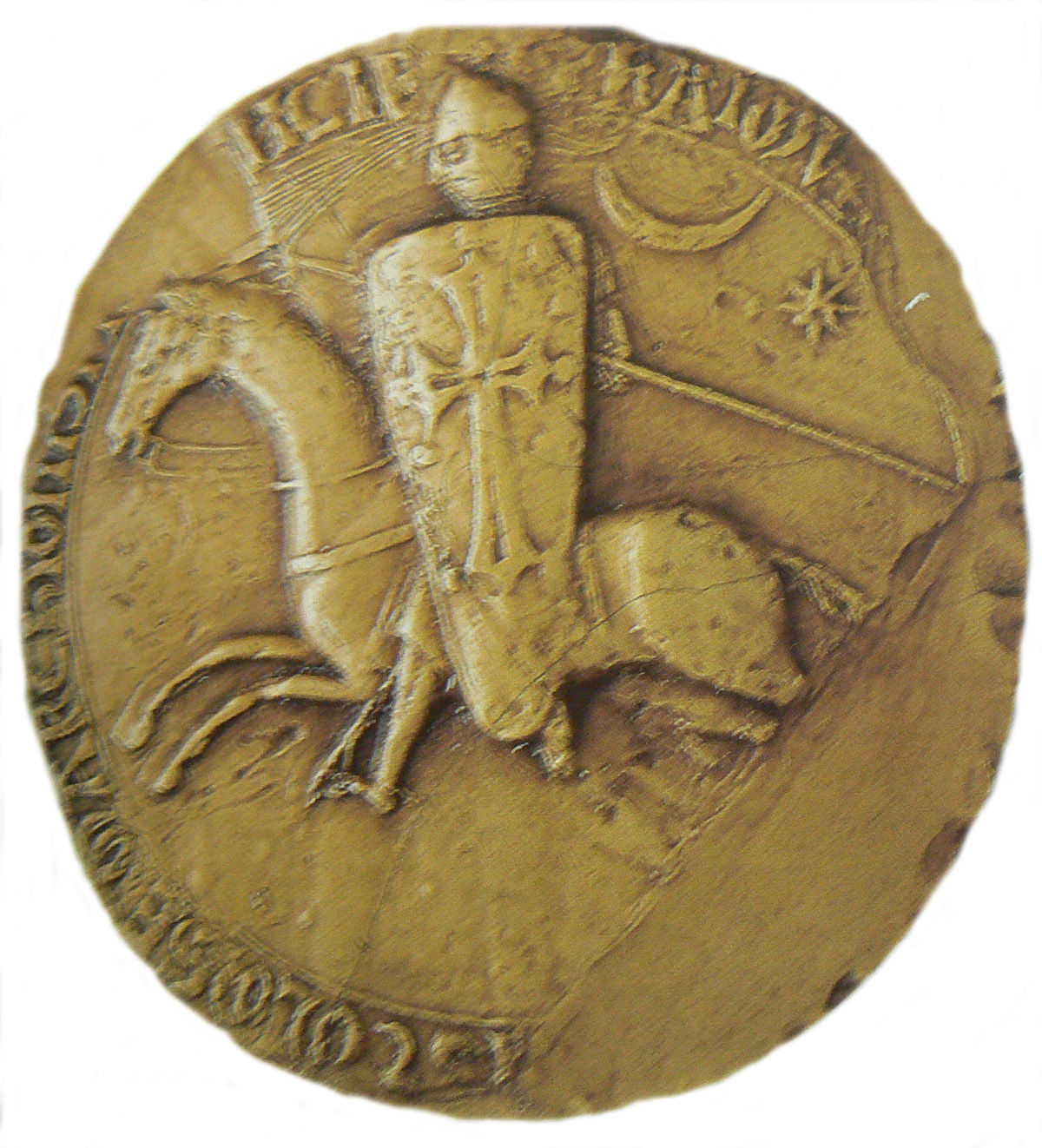
Equestrian seal of Raymond VI, Count of Toulouse with a star and a crescent (13th century)

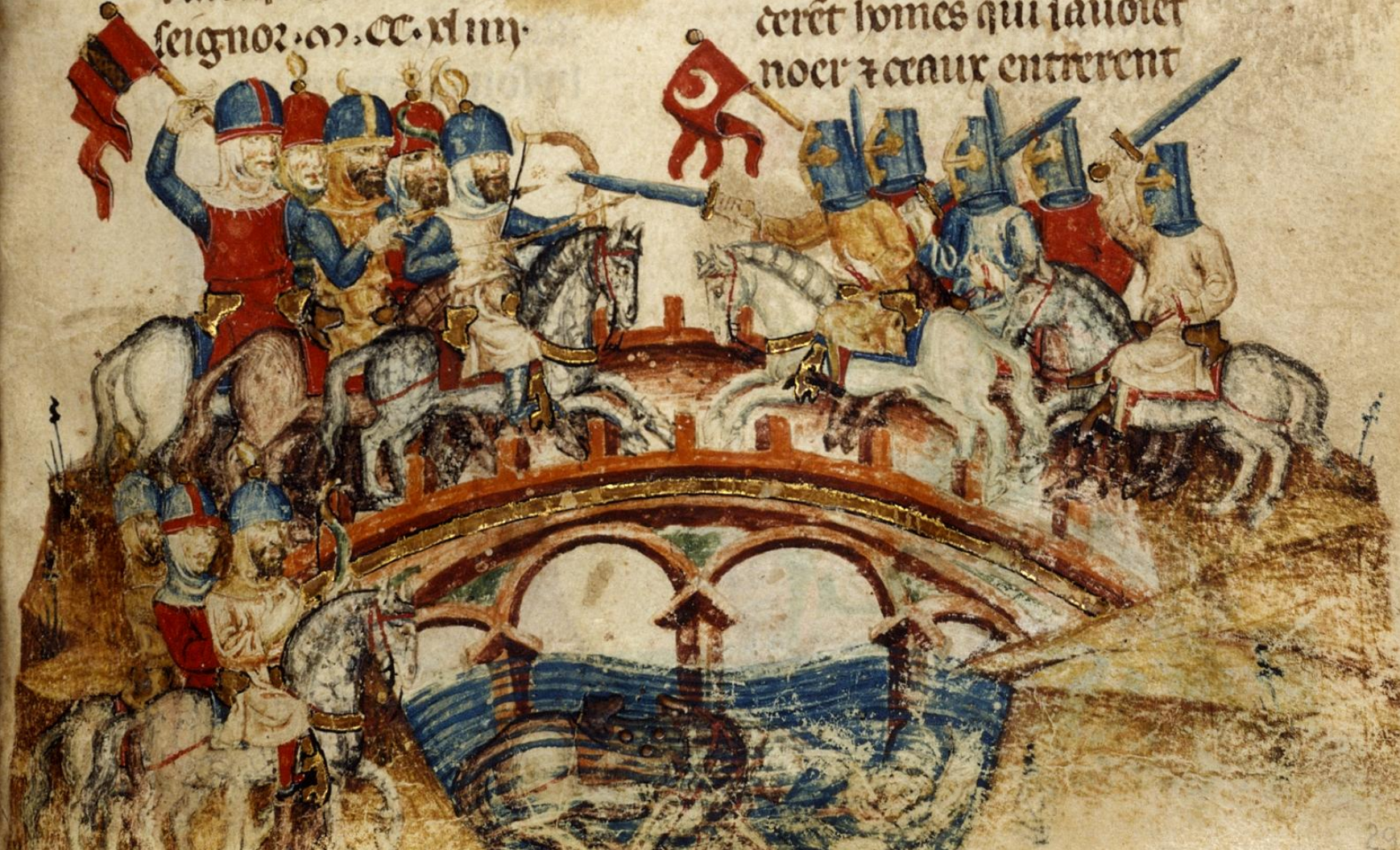
The crescent flag ascribed to the Hungarians against the Mongol Golden Horde in the Battle of Mohi, 1241.

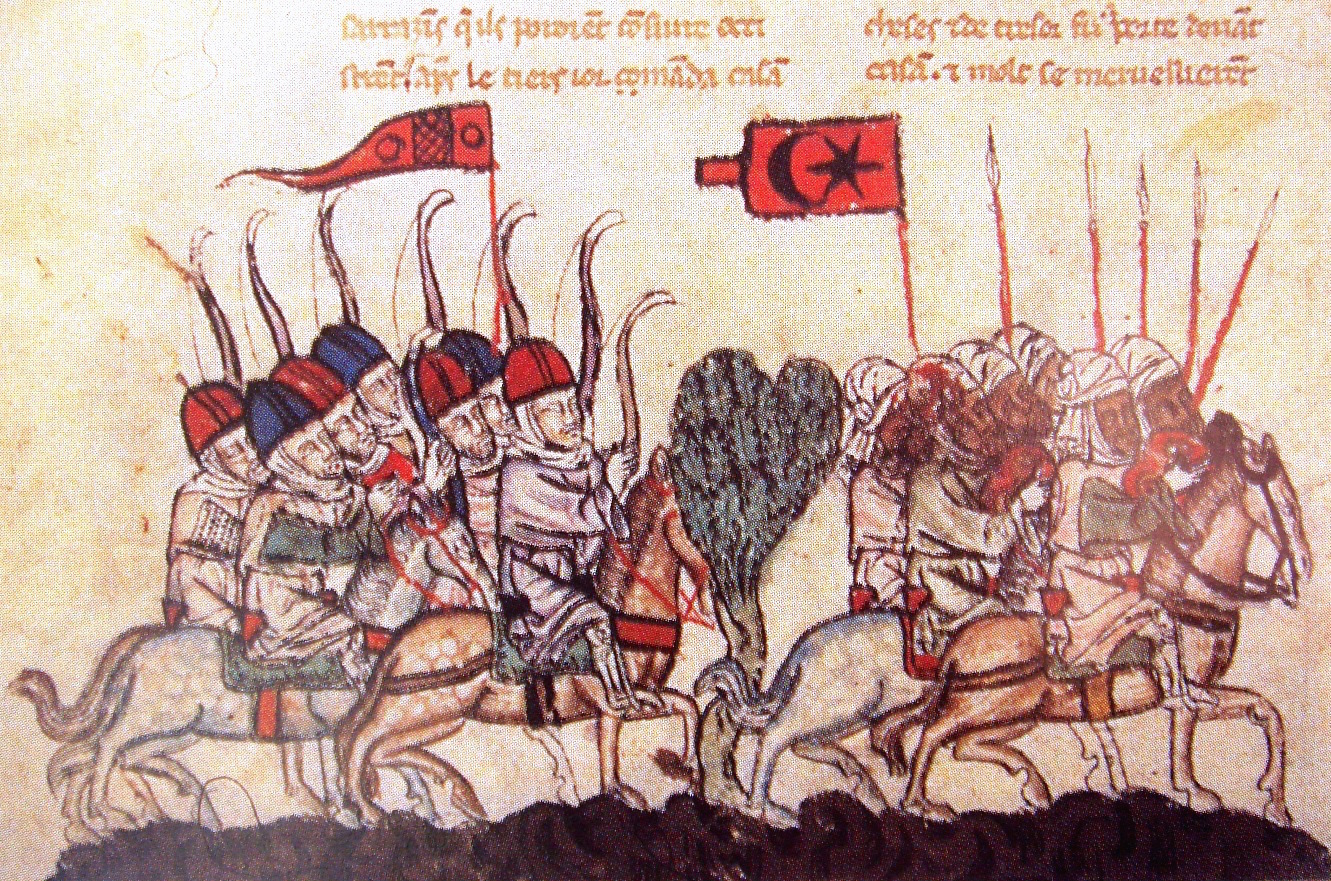
Battle of Wadi al-Khaznadar (Battle of Homs) of 1299 (14th-century miniature)

Historical coat of arms of Kunság, where Cumans in Hungary settled, 1279.

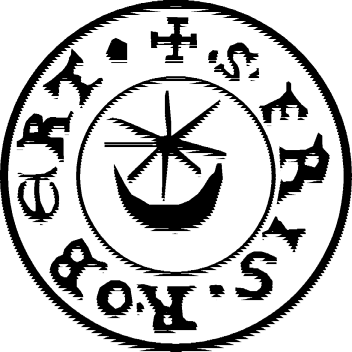
Templar seal of the 13th century, probably of the preceptor of the commanderies at Coudrie and Biais (Brittany).

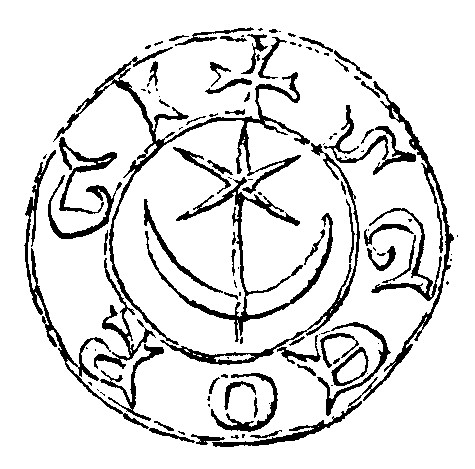
Polish coats of arms, called Leliwa (1334 seal)

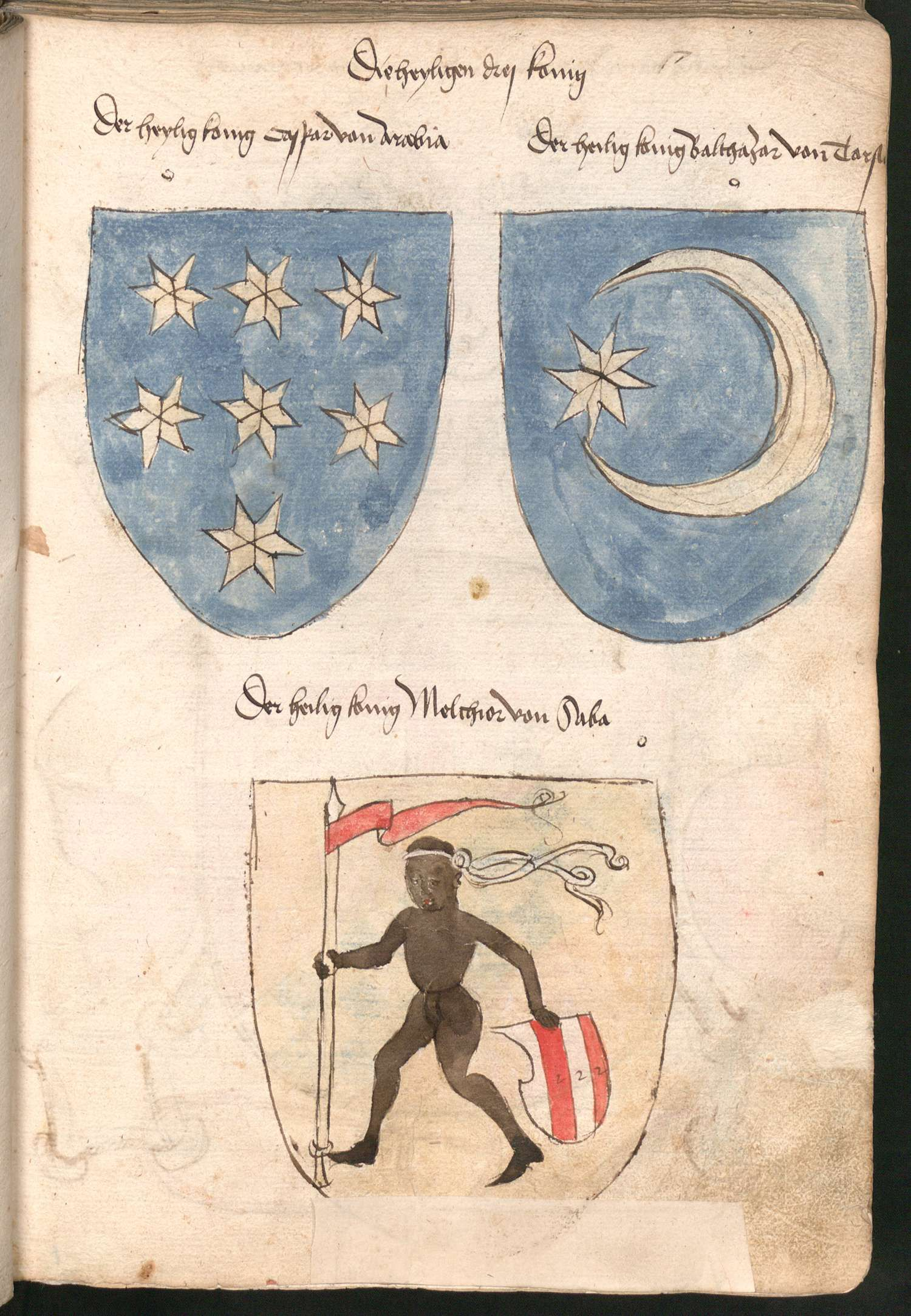
Coats of arms of the Three Magi, with "Baltasar of Tarsus" being attributed a star and crescent increscent in a blue field, Wernigerode Armorial (c. 1490)

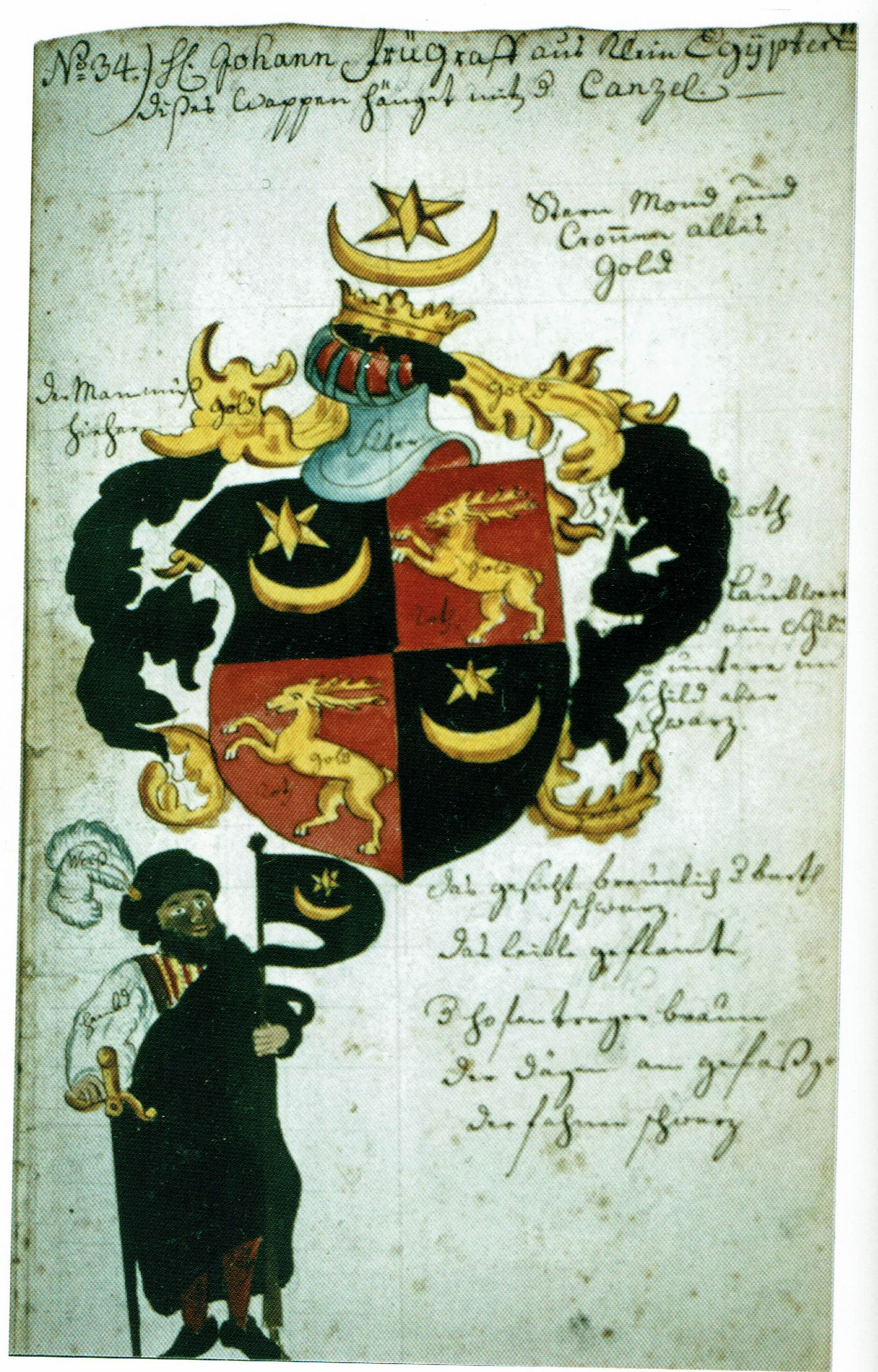
Coat of arms of John Freigraf of "Lesser Egypt" (i.e. Romani/gypsy), 18th-century drawing of a 1498 coat of arms in Pforzheim church.

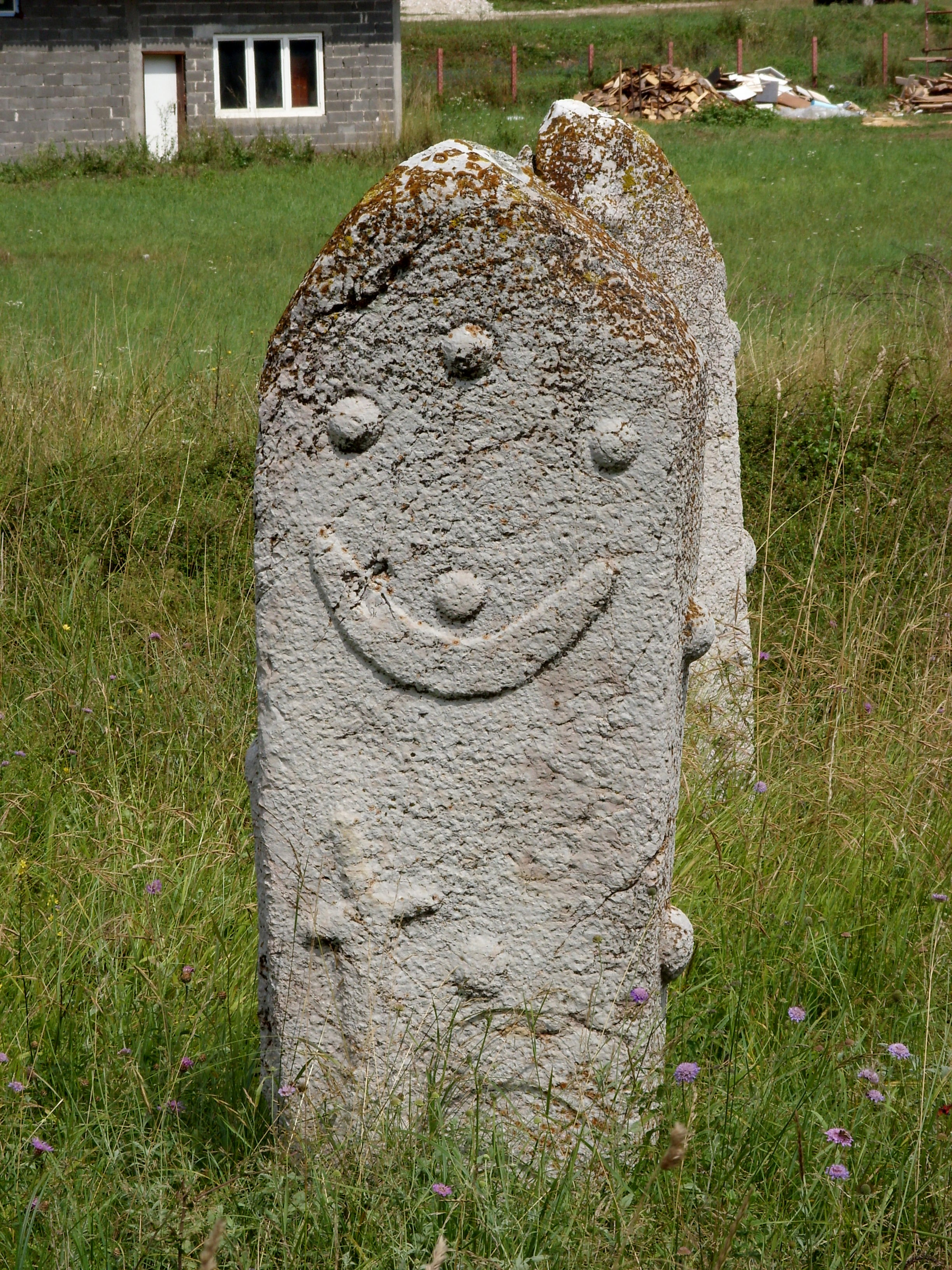
Depictions of stars with crescents are a common motif on the stećak 12th to 16th century tombstones of medieval Bosnia

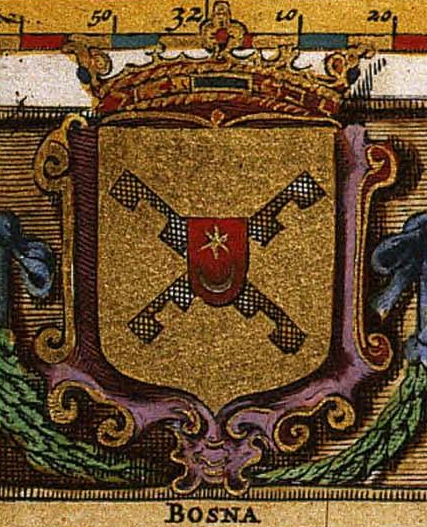
1668 representation by Joan Blaeu of Coat of arms of the Kingdom of Bosnia from 1595 Korenić-Neorić Armorial

The coat of arms of "Illyria" from the Korenić-Neorić Armorial (1590s)

Banner of Cumania, used at the coronation of Ferdinand II of Hungary in 1618 and assigned to Gáspár (Caspar) Illésházy.

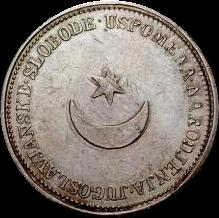
Star and crescent on the obverse of the Jelacic-Gulden of the Kingdom of Croatia (1848)

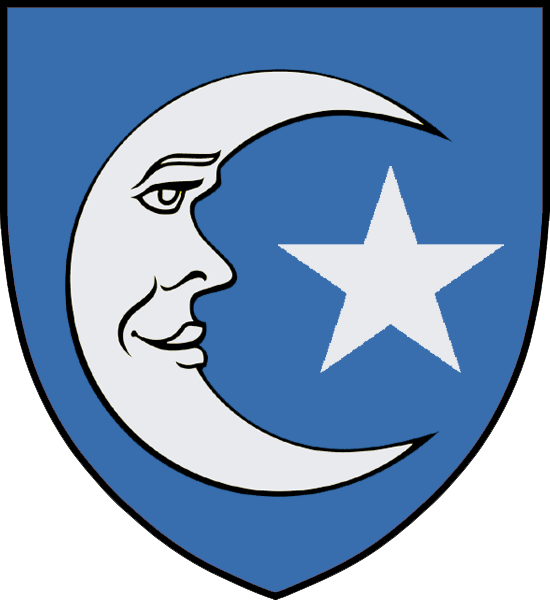
Coat of arms of the noble family Slatte (1625–1699) in Sweden.

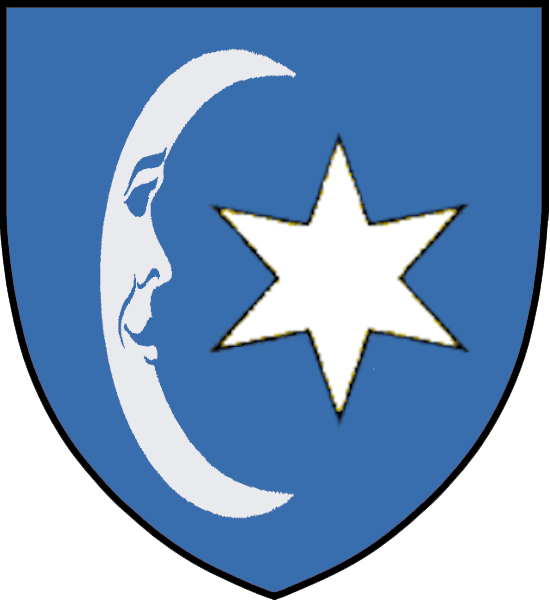
Coat of arms of the noble family Finckenberg (1627–1809) in Sweden.

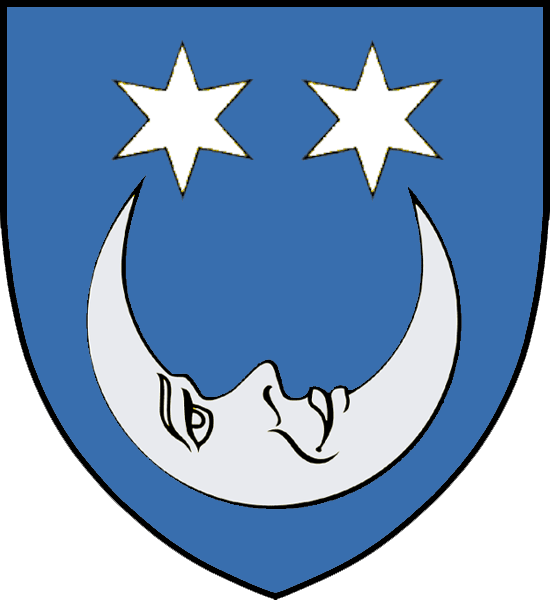
Coat of arms of the noble family Boose (1642–1727) in Sweden.

Banner of the Zaporizhian Sich (Cossacks of Ukraine) before 1775.

Coat of arms of Transylvania

==== Muslim usage ====
While the crescent on its own is depicted as an emblem used on Islamic war flags from the medieval period, at least from the 13th century although it does not seem to have been in frequent use until the 14th or 15th century, the star and crescent in an Islamic context is more rare in the medieval period, but may occasionally be found in depictions of flags from the 14th century onward.

Some Mughal era (17th century) round shields were decorated with a crescent or star and crescent.

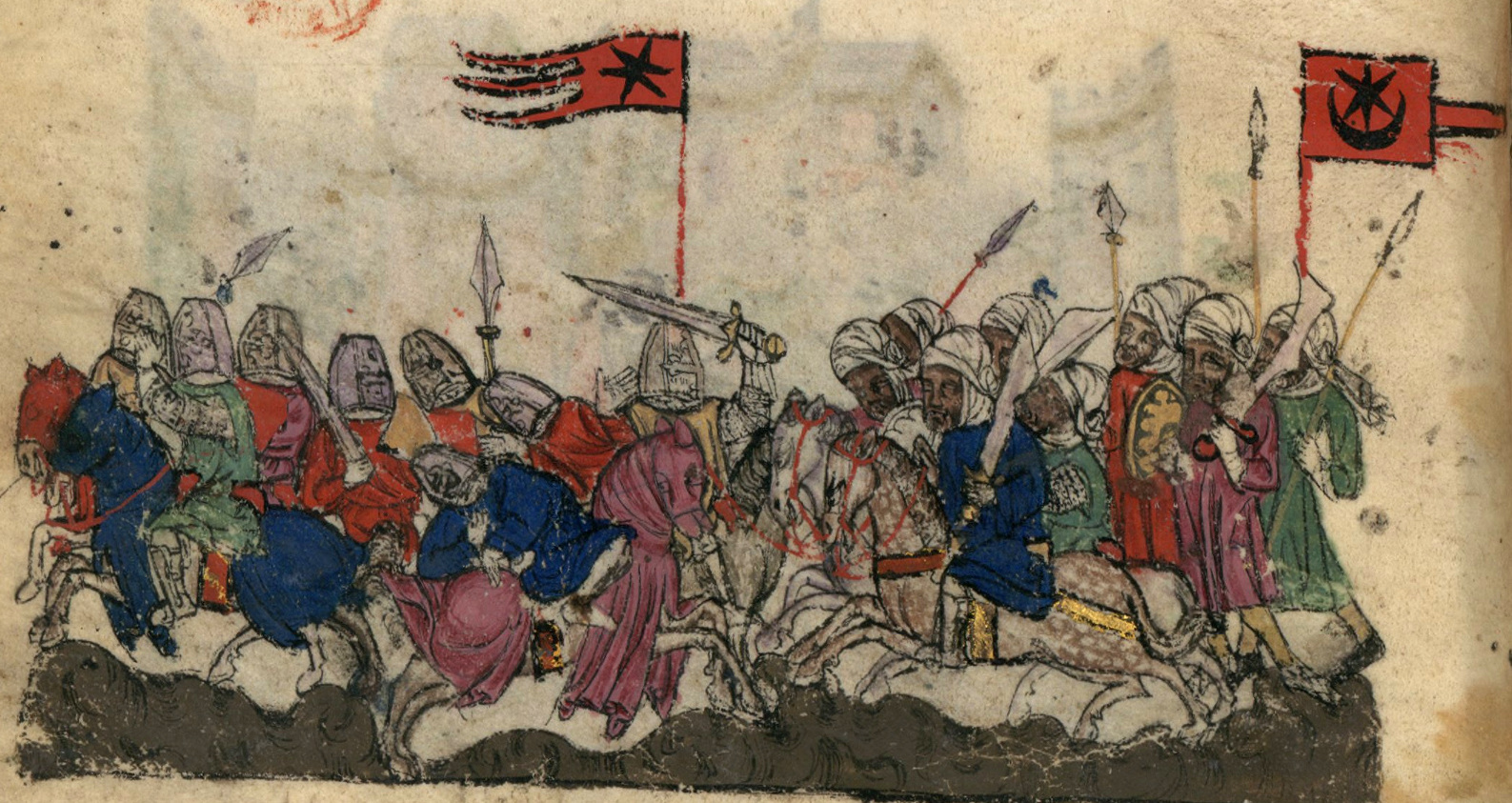
Depiction of a star and crescent flag on the Saracen side in the Battle of Yarmouk (manuscript illustration of the History of the Tatars, Catalan workshop, early 14th century).

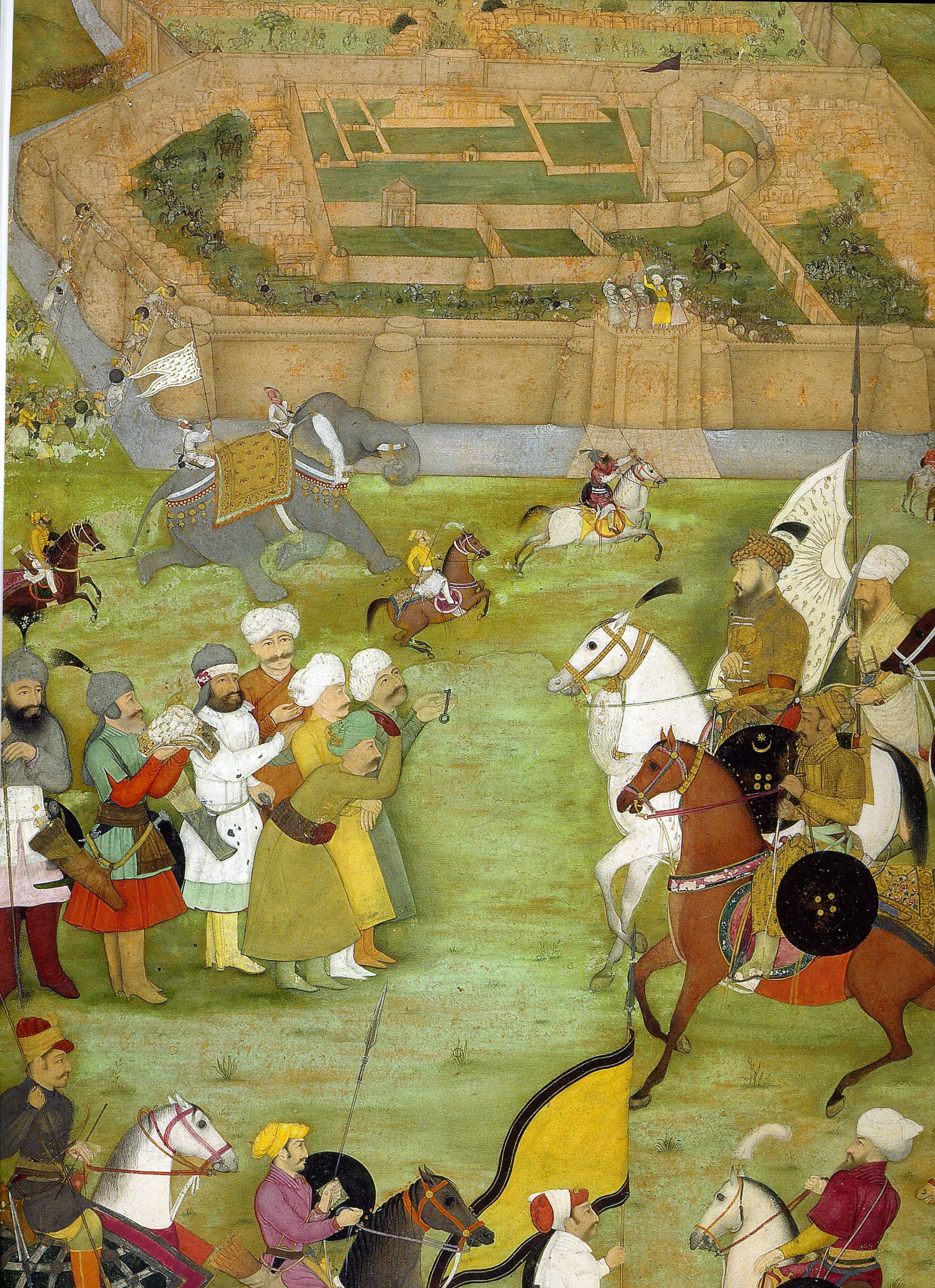
A miniature painting from a Padshahnama manuscript (c. 1640), depicting Mughal Emperor Shah Jahan as bearing a shield with a star and crescent decoration.

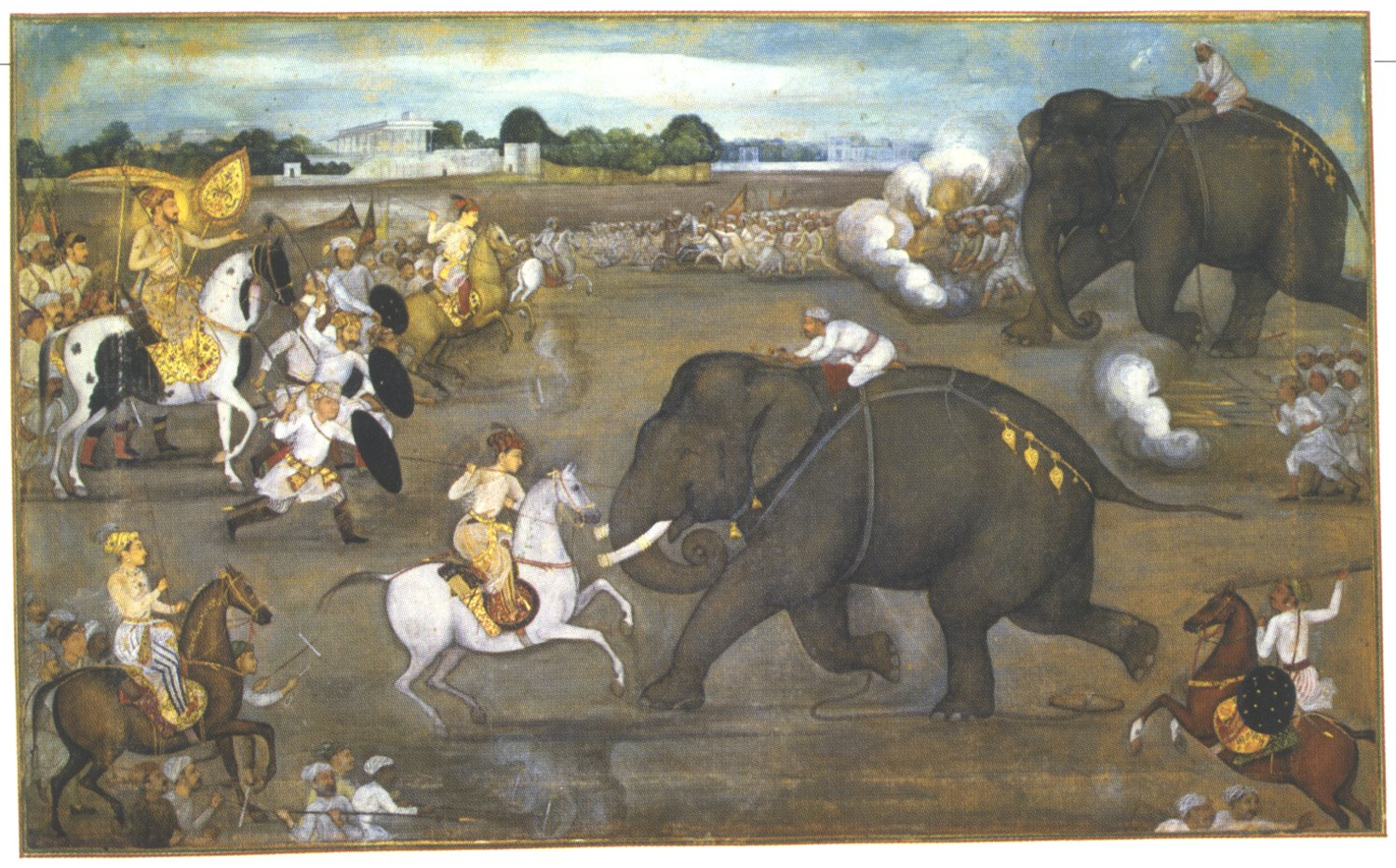
A painting from a Padshahnama manuscript (1633) depicts the scene of Aurangzeb facing the maddened war elephant Sudhakar. Sowar's shield is decorated with a star and crescent.

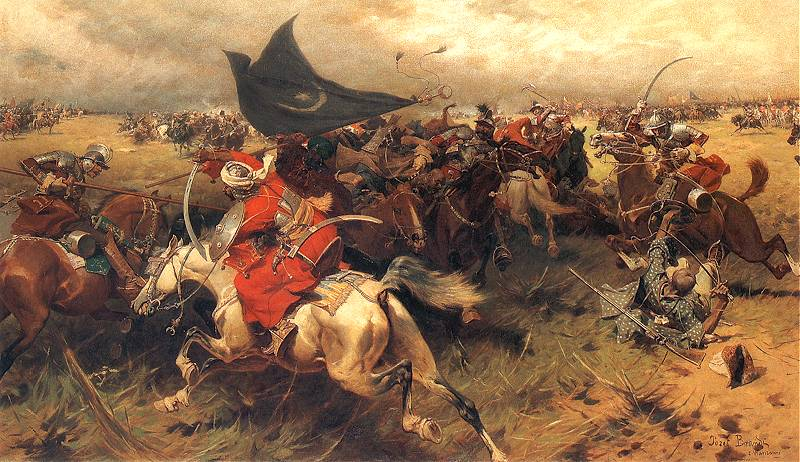
Ottoman sipahis in battle, holding the crescent banner (by Józef Brandt)

Flag of the Emirate of Jabal Shammar (Ha'il in today's Kingdom of Saudi Arabia) from 1835 to 1921

Coat of arms of Khedivate of Egypt (1867–1914)

Flag of the Kingdom of Egypt (1922–1953) and co-official flag of the Republic of Egypt (1953–1958)

Flag of the Free Officers Movement (1949–1953) and co-official flag of the Republic of Egypt (1953–1958)

Flag of the Sultanate of Aceh (1496–1903)

==== Use in the Ottoman Empire ====
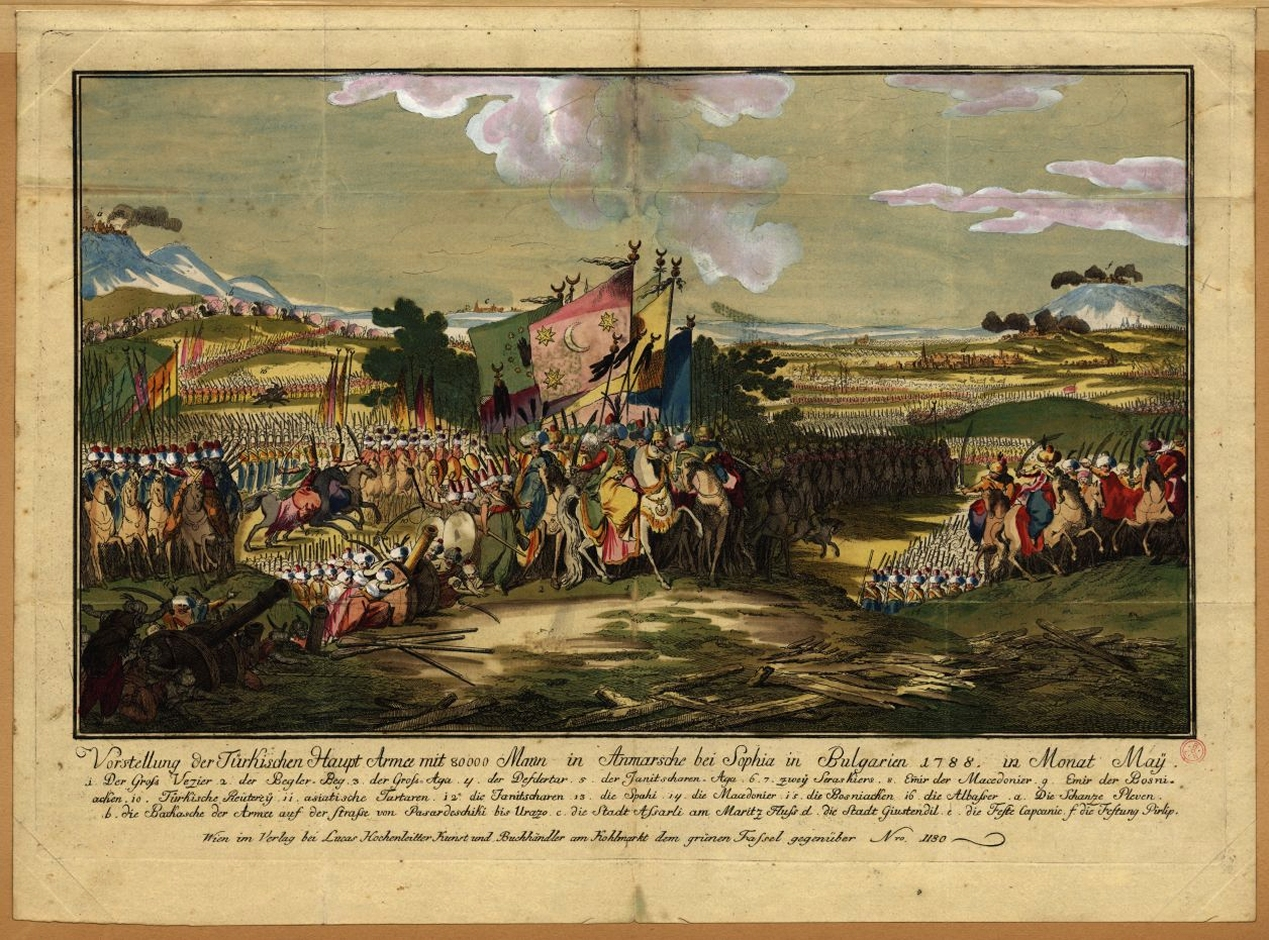
The Ottoman Army approaching the city of Sofia in 1788.

Ottoman eight-pointed star flag, used between 1793 and 1844

Ottoman five-pointed star variant, used as the naval ensign and state symbol from the late 18th century onward, and as the official national flag from 1844 to 1922

Flag of Ottoman Bosnia and Herzegovina

The adoption of star and crescent as the Ottoman state symbol started during the reign of Mustafa III (1757–1774) and its use became well-established during the periods of Abdul Hamid I (1774–1789) and Selim III (1789–1807). A decree (buyruk) from 1793 states that the ships in the Ottoman navy fly that flag, and various other documents from earlier and later years mention its use. The ultimate source of the emblem is unclear. It is mostly derived from the star-and-crescent symbol used by the city of Constantinople in antiquity, possibly by association with the crescent design (without the star) used in Turkish flags since before 1453.

With the Tanzimat reforms in the 19th century, flags were redesigned in the style of the European armies of the day. The flag of the Ottoman Navy was made red, as red was to be the flag of secular institutions and green of religious ones. However, the flag of Rumelia Eyalet representing the people of the western portion of the Empire was also green.

As the reforms abolished all the various flags (standards) of the Ottoman pashaliks, beyliks and emirates, a single new Ottoman national flag was designed to replace them. The result was the red flag with the white crescent moon and star, which is the precursor to the modern flag of Turkey. A plain red flag was introduced as the civil ensign for all Ottoman subjects.

The white crescent with an eight-pointed star on a red field is depicted as the flag of a "Turkish Man of War" in Colton's Delineation of Flags of All Nations (1862). Steenbergen's Vlaggen van alle Natiën of the same year shows a six-pointed star. A plate in Webster's Unabridged of 1882 shows the flag with an eight-pointed star labelled "Turkey, Man of war". The five-pointed star seems to have been present alongside these variants from at least 1857.

In addition to Ottoman imperial insignia, symbols appear on the flag of Bosnia Eyalet (1580–1867) and Bosnia Vilayet (1867–1908), as well as the flag of 1831 Bosnian revolt, while the symbols appeared on some representations of medieval Bosnian coat of arms too.

In the late 19th century, "Star and Crescent" came to be used as a metaphor for Ottoman rule in British literature. The increasingly ubiquitous fashion of using the star and crescent symbol in the ornamentation of Ottoman mosques and minarets led to a gradual association of the symbol with Islam in general in western Orientalism. The "Red Crescent" emblem was used by volunteers of the International Committee of the Red Cross (ICRC) as early as 1877 during the Russo-Turkish War; it was officially adopted in 1929.

After the foundation of the Republic of Turkey in 1923, the new Turkish state maintained the last flag of the Ottoman Empire. Proportional standardisations were introduced in the Turkish Flag Law (Turkish: Türk Bayrağı Kanunu) of May 29, 1936. Besides the most prominent example of Turkey (see Flag of Turkey), a number of other Ottoman successor states adopted the design during the 20th century, including the Emirate of Cyrenaica and the Kingdom of Libya, Algeria, Tunisia, and the proposed Arab Islamic Republic.

== Contemporary use ==
=== National flags ===
Tunisia was the first to have adopted the star and crescent design on a national flag in 1831, influenced by the Ottoman naval standard at the time. This continues to be the Tunisian national flag post-independence. The Ottoman flag of 1844 with a white moon-star on a red background, continues to be in use as the flag of Turkey with minor changes.

Other states that were in the Ottoman sphere of influence adopted the design in their flags post-independence, including Libya (1951, re-introduced 2011) and Algeria (1958). The modern emblem of Turkey shows the star outside the arc of the crescent, as it were a "realistic" depiction of a conjunction of Moon and Venus, while in the 19th century, the Ottoman star and crescent was occasionally still drawn as the star-within-crescent. By contrast, the designs of both the flags of Algeria and Tunisia (as well as Mauritania and Pakistan) place the star within the crescent.

Flag of Turkey

Flag of Tunisia

Flag of Libya

Flag of Algeria

The same symbol was and is used in other national flags introduced during the 20th century, including the flags of Kazakhstan (1917), Azerbaijan (1918, re-introduced 1991), the Rif Republic (1921), Pakistan (1947), Malaysia (1948), Mauritania (1959), Kashmir (1974) and the partially recognized states of the Sahrawi Arab Democratic Republic (1976) and Northern Cyprus (1983). The symbol may also represent the flag of cities or emirates such as the emirate of Umm Al-Quwain.

Flag of Azerbaijan

Flag of the Rif Republic

Flag of Pakistan

Flag of Malaysia

Flag of Mauritania

Flag of Sahrawi Arab Democratic Republic

Flag of Northern Cyprus

Emirate of Cyrenaica (1949–1951)

Flag of Umm al-Quwain

Flag of East Turkestan (1934)

Flag of Iraq Turkmens

Flag of Syrian Turkmen

Flag of Azad Kashmir

Alash Autonomy (1917)

Turkestan Autonomy (1917-1918)

Flag of SSB (Habr Je'lo)

Flag of Nepal

National flags with a crescent alongside several stars:

Flag of Singapore (1965): crescent and five stars

Flag of Uzbekistan (1991): crescent and twelve stars

Flag of Turkmenistan (2001): crescent and five stars (representing five provinces)

Flag of the Comoros (2002): crescent and four stars (representing four islands)

Flag of Egypt (1922–1958): crescent and three stars (representing three component territories)

National flags and coat of arms with star, crescent and other symbols:

Flag of Moldova (1990)

Flag of Croatia (1990)

Flag of Miꞌkmaꞌki (1867)

Coat of arms of Romania

Flag of Moldavia (15th to 16th century)

=== Symbol of Islam ===
Used as the symbol of Islam by the Nation of Islam

By the mid-20th century, the symbol came to be re-interpreted as a symbol of Islam or the Muslim community. This symbolism was embraced by movements of Arab nationalism or Islamism in the 1970s too, such as the proposed Arab Islamic Republic (1974) and the American Nation of Islam (1973).

Cyril Glassé in his The New Encyclopedia of Islam (2001 edition, s.v. "Moon") states that "in the language of conventional symbols, the crescent and star have become the symbols of Islam as much as the cross is the symbol of Christianity."

By contrast, Crescent magazine — a religious Islamic publication — quoted without giving names that "Many Muslim scholars reject using the crescent moon as a symbol of Islam".

On February 28, 2017, it was announced by the Qira County government in Hotan Prefecture, Xinjiang, China that those who reported others for stitching the 'star and crescent moon' insignia on their clothing or personal items or having the words 'East Turkestan' on their mobile phone case, purse or other jewelry, would be eligible for cash payments.

=== Municipal coats of arms ===
The star and crescent as a traditional heraldic charge is in continued use in numerous municipal coats of arms; notably that based on the Leliwa (Tarnowski) coat of arms in the case of Polish municipalities.

Coat of arms of Halle an der Saale, Germany (1327).

Coat of arms of Mińsk Mazowiecki, Poland.

Coat of arms of Przeworsk, Poland.

Coat of arms of Tarnobrzeg, Poland.

Coat of arms of Tarnów, Poland.

Coat of arms of Topoľčany, Slovakia

Coat of arms of Zagreb, Croatia.

Flag of Portsmouth, England (18th century): crescent and estoile (with eight wavy rays).

Coat of arms of Mattighofen, Austria (1781)

Coat of arms of Oelde, Germany (1910).

Coat of arms of Niederglatt, Switzerland (1928)

Coat of arms of Oberglatt, Switzerland (1928)

Coat of arms of Niederweningen, Switzerland (1928)

Coat of arms of Drogheda, Ireland

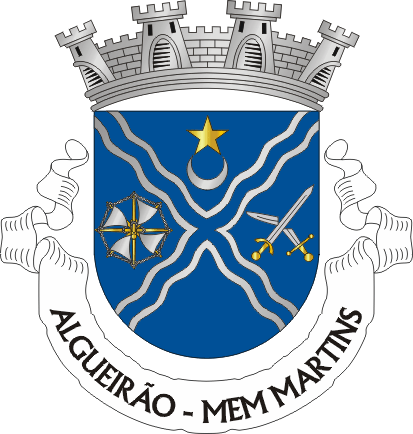
Coat of arms of Algueirão-Mem Martins parish, Portugal

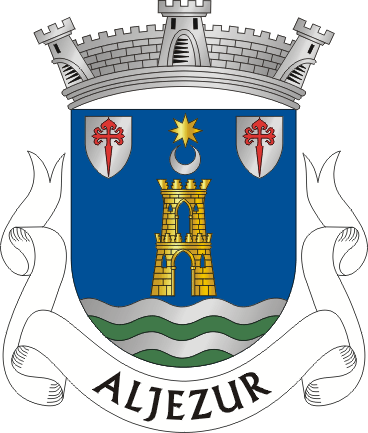
Coat of arms of Aljezur parish, Portugal

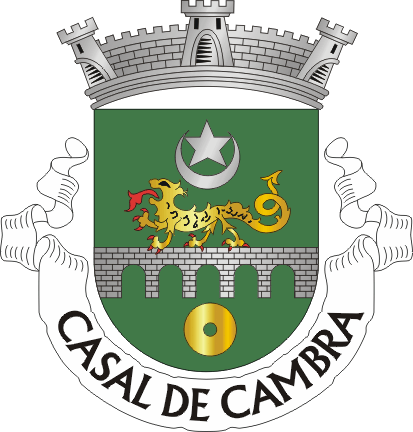
Coat of arms of Casal de Cambra parish, Portugal

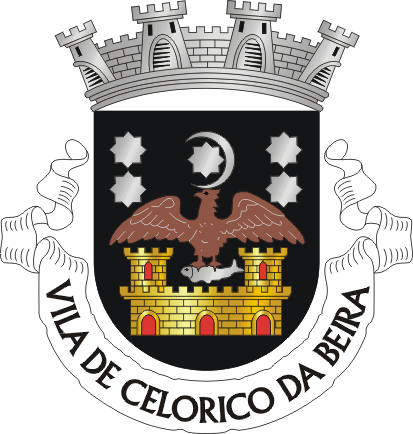
Coat of arms of Celorico da Beira municipality, Portugal

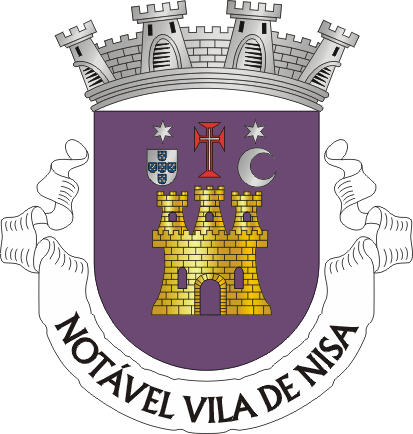
Coat of arms of Nisa municipality, Portugal

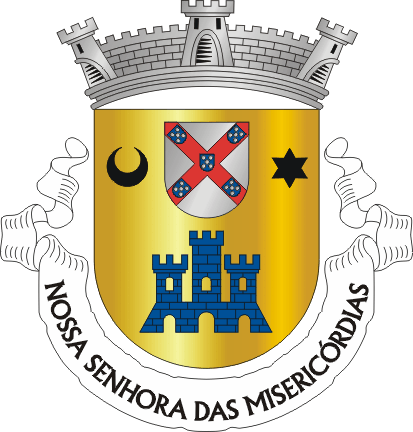
Coat of arms of Nossa Senhora das Misericórdias parish, Portugal

Coat of arms of Oliveira do Bairro municipality, Portugal

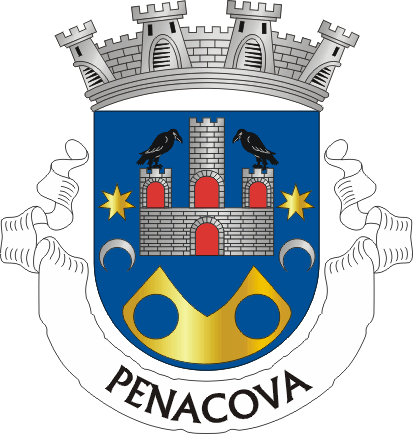
Coat of arms of Penacova municipality, Portugal

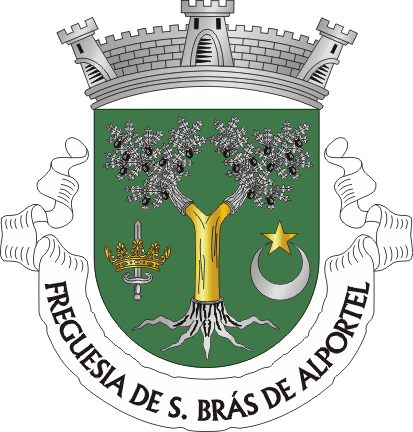
Coat of arms of São Brás de Alportel parish, Portugal

Coat of arms of Sintra municipality, Portugal

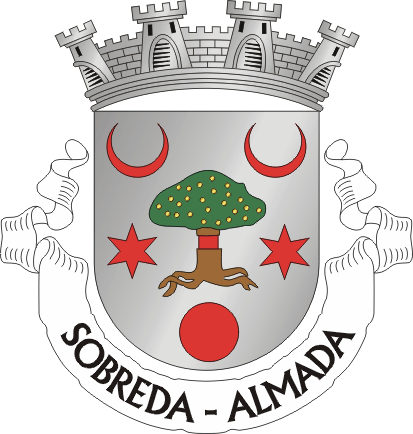
Coat of arms of Sobreda parish, Portugal

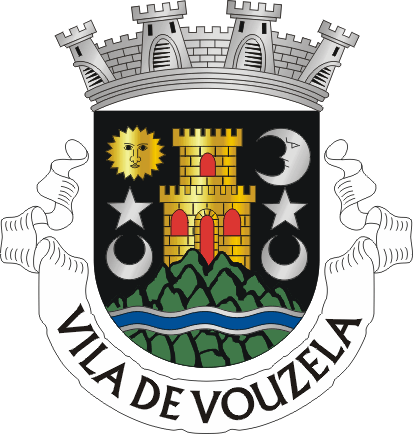
Coat of arms of Vouzela municipality, Portugal

=== Diocesan Coat of Arms ===
Coat of arms of the Archdiocese of Agaña

Coat of arms of the Diocese of Arlington

Coat of arms of the Diocese of Juneau

Coat of arms of the Archdiocese of Moncton

Coat of arms of the Eparchy of Newton

Coat of arms of the Archdiocese of Anchorage-Juneau

Coat of arms of the Diocese of Jefferson City

Coat of arms of the Archdiocese of Vitória da Conquista

Coat of arms of the Archdiocese of Cotabato

Coat of arms of the Territorial Prelature of Batanes

=== Sports Club Emblems ===
In rugby union, Saracens F.C. incorporates the star and crescent in its crest. Drogheda United F.C., Portsmouth F.C., and S.U. Sintrense all borrow the star and crescent from their respective towns' coats of arms. Mohammedan SC in Kolkata, India also incorporates the symbol in its crest.

Emblem of Saracens F.C.

=== Other uses ===
Post WWII flag of the Japan Air Self-Defense Force (JASDF)

Turkish Air Force aviator badge

Flag of the Pakistan Army

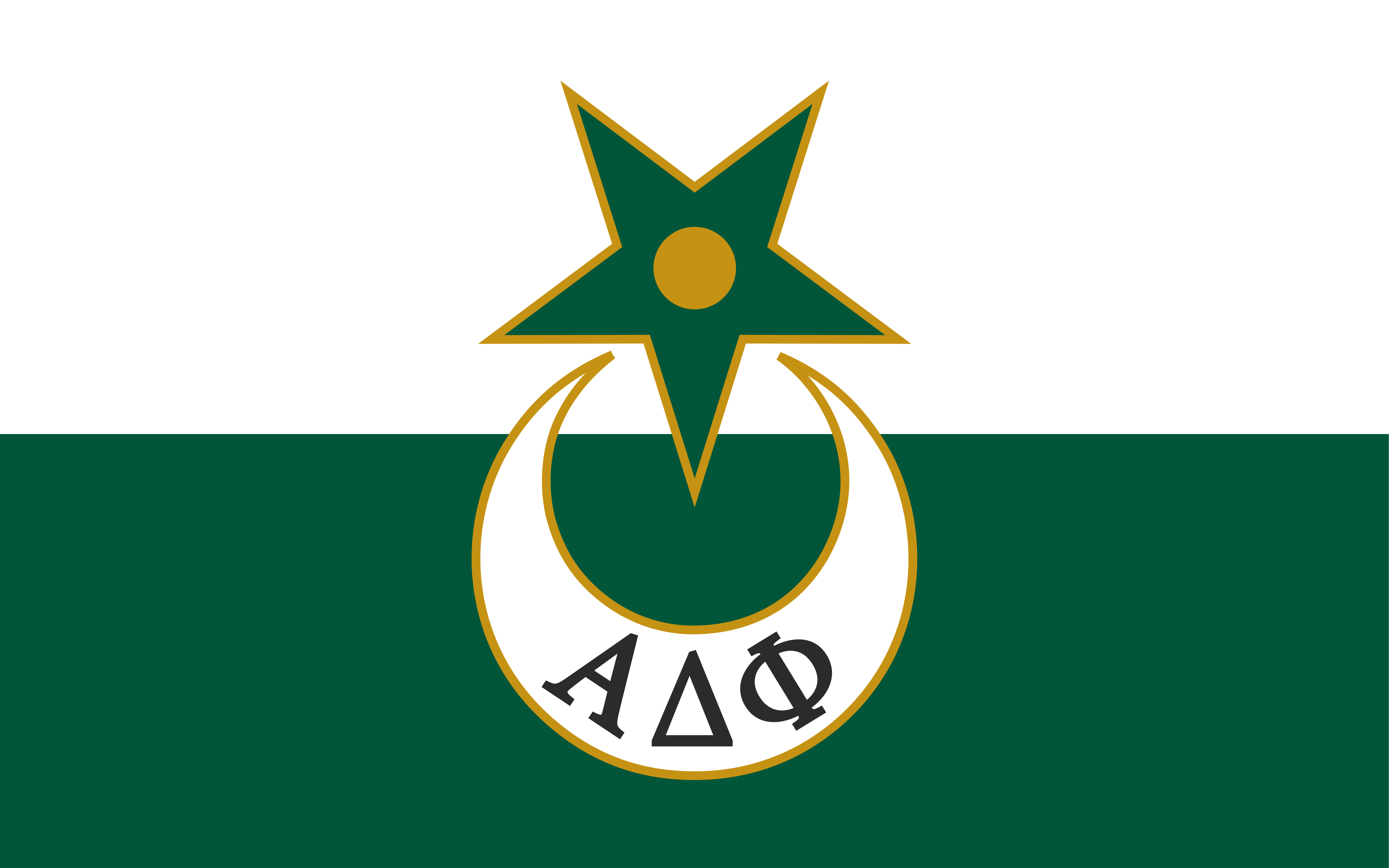
Flag of the Alpha Delta Phi fraternity

Flag of the Organization of Turkic States

Insignia of East Bengal Regiment

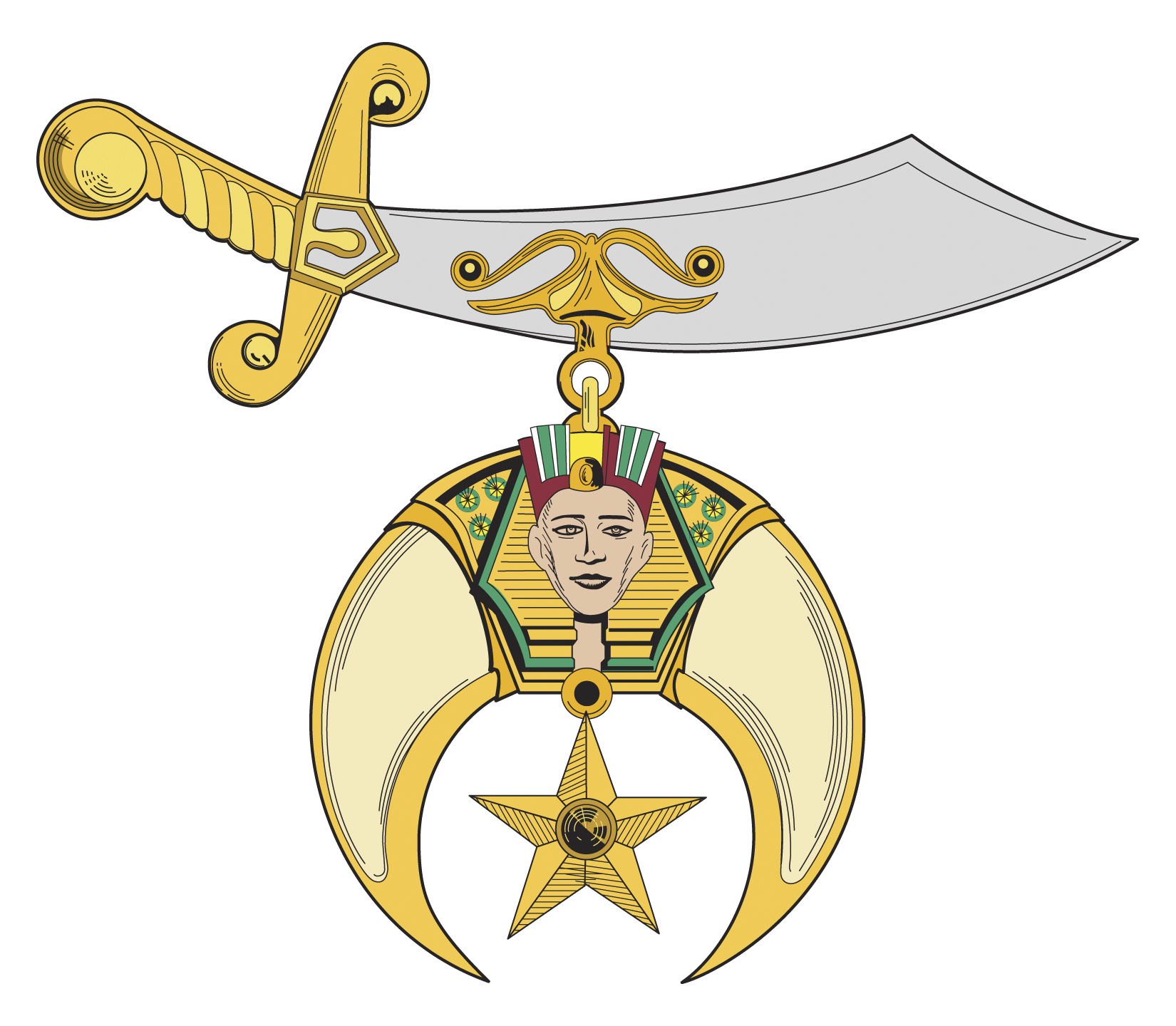
Logo of Shriners International

Logo of the Felicity Party of Turkey

Logo of Young Party of Turkey

Logo of Independent Turkey Party

Logo of the Crescent Star Party of Indonesia

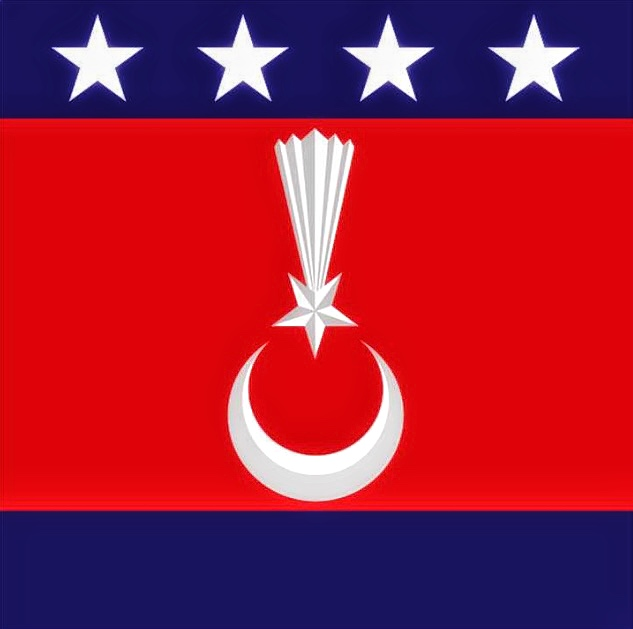
Flag of the Gendarmerie General Command of Turkey

=== Use in computer documents and printing ===
The symbol has a codepoint in Unicode, which is U+262A ☪ STAR AND CRESCENT. The precise form of the symbol displayed or printed depends on the computer font chosen.

== See also ==
- Lunar phase – Shape of the Moon's sunlit portion as viewed from Earth
- New Orleans Police Department – Municipal police department in Louisiana, U.S.
- Pentagram of Venus – Apparent path of the planet
- Star – Typographical symbol
