= List of Bangladeshi flags =

Bangladeshi flags

This is a list of flags used in Bangladesh. For more information about the national flag, visit the article Flag of Bangladesh.

== National flag ==
Flag	Date	Use	Description
	1972–present	National flag of Bangladesh	A red disc on a green field, offset slightly toward the hoist.
	1972–present	Flag of Bangladesh (vertical)	

== Ceremonial parade flags ==
Flag	Date	Use	Description
	1972–present	Used during national processions	Modified version of the national flag of Bangladesh, featuring a red disc on a green field, with a gold fringe and inscribed at the top with the Quranic verse: "إِنَّ ٱللَّهَ عَلَىٰ كُلِّ شَىْءٍۢ قَدِيرٌۭ" (Indeed, Allah is over all things competent) from Surah Al-Baqarah [2:20].

== Government flags ==
Flag	Date	Use	Description
	1972–present	Presidential standard	The presidential seal on a dark red background.
	1972–present	Standard of the prime minister of Bangladesh	Seal of the prime minister on a dark red background.
	1996–2011, 2024–present	Standard of the chief adviser of Bangladesh	Seal of the chief adviser on a dark red background.
	1972–present	Flag of the Jatiya Sangsad (Parliament)	Seal of the Parliament on a Bangladesh green background.
	1972–present	Flag of the Speaker of the Jatiya Sangsad (Parlament)	Seal of the Speaker of the Parliament on a Bangladesh green background.
	1972–present	Flag of the Supreme Court of Bangladesh	Seal of the Supreme Court on a blue background.
	1972–present	Flag of the Chief Justice of Bangladesh	Seal of the Chief Justice of Bangladesh on a blue background.
	2010–present	Flag of the Chief Prosecutor of International Crimes Tribunal (Bangladesh)	Seal of the government of Bangladesh in a blue field with "Chief Prosecutor International Crimes Tribunal" written below.
	1972–present	Flag of the Bangladesh Election Commission	Seal of the Bangladesh Election Commission on a teal background.
	1972–present	Flag of the Chief Election Commissioner of Bangladesh	Seal of the Bangladesh Election Commission on a green background and "প্রধান নির্বাচন কমিশনার" (Chief Election Commissioner) written in Bengali above.
	2017–present	Flag of the Anti-Corruption Commission	Seal of the Anti-Corruption Commission on a sky blue background.

== Civil ensign ==
Flag	Date	Use	Description
	1972–present	Civil ensign of Bangladesh (Bangladesh Merchant Navy)	A red ensign with the flag of Bangladesh in the canton influenced by the British Red Ensign.

== Military flags ==
Flag	Date	Use	Description
	1972–present	Flag of the Bangladesh Armed Forces	A three-colored flag with the joint-services emblem in the center.
	1972–present	Flag of the Bangladesh Army	The Army's badge on a green field.
	1972–present	Flag of the Bangladesh Air Force	A sky-blue ensign with the flag of Bangladesh in the canton, and the Air Force roundel in the fly.
	1972–present	Ensign of the Bangladesh Navy	A white ensign with the flag of Bangladesh in the canton.
	1995–present	Ensign of the Bangladesh Coast Guard	A light blue ensign with the flag of Bangladesh in the canton.
	1972–present	Standard of the Chief of Army Staff	A green field with the Chief of Army Staff seal in the center and four stars below.
Link to image	1972–present	Standard of the Chief of Naval Staff	The Navy's badge on a blue field.
	1972–present	Standard of the Chief of Air Staff	Air Force ensign of Bangladesh with four white stars in the lower hoist.
	1972–present	Standard of the Captain	A triangluar swallowtail flag with Navy's Badge on a blue field.
	2010–present	Flag of the Border Guards Bangladesh (BGB)	The BGB's badge on a maroon field.
	1977–present	Flag of the Directorate General of Forces Intelligence (Armed Forces)	The DGFI's insignia on a green field.
	1948–present	Regimental flag of the East Bengal Regiment (Bangladesh Army)	EBR's insignia on a dark maroon field.
	2016–present	Regimental flag of the Para Commando Brigade (Bangladesh Army)	Para Commando Brigade insignia on a dark purple field.
	1976–present	Regimental flag of the President Guard Regiment (Bangladesh Army)	PGR's insignia on a red field.
	1972–present	Flag of the 66th Infantry Division of the Bangladesh Army	66th Infantry Division insignia on a dark red field.
	2018–present	Regimental flag of the 7th Infantry Division of the Bangladesh Army	The 7th infantry division's insignia on a red field.
	1979–present	Flag of the Bangladesh National Cadet Corps (BNCC)	Red, navy, and sky blue horizontal tricolor with the BNCC emblem in the center.

== Police and civil defense flags ==
Flag	Date	Use	Description
	2025–present	Flag of the Bangladesh Police	Logo of the Bangladesh Police on a dark blue field.
	1971–present	Flag of the Criminal Investigation Department	Logo of the Criminal Investigation Department on a dark blue field.
	2025–present	Flag of the Inspector General of Police	
	1981–present	Flag of the Bangladesh Fire Service & Civil Defence	Logo of Bangladesh Fire Service & Civil Defence on an orange field.
	1948–present	Flag of the Bangladesh Ansar-VDP	Ansar insignia on a green and red vertical bicolor.
	1972–present	Flag of Bangladesh Customs	Badge of Bangladesh Customs, outlined in white, on a dark blue background.
	1986–present	Flag of the Special Security Force	Insignia of the Special Security Force on a dark green field.

== Bangladesh Scouts ==
Flag	Date	Use	Description
Link to flag	1972–present	Flag of the Bangladesh Scouts	Bangladesh Scouts logo on a dark green field.
Link to flag	1974–present	Flag of the Bangladesh Scouts Rover Region	Bangladesh Scouts logo on a dark red field with golden text below saying "Rover Region".
Link to flag	1972–present	Flag of the Bangladesh Scouts Railway Region	Bangladesh Scouts logo on a railway blue field with golden text below saying "Railway Region".
Link to flag	1976–present	Flag of the Bangladesh Scouts; Naval Region	Bangladesh Naval Scouts logo on a navy blue field with golden text below saying "Naval Region".
Link to flag	1977–present	Flag of the Bangladesh Scouts; Air Region	Bangladesh Air Scouts logo on a sky blue field with golden text below saying "Air Region".

== Ethnic flags ==
Flag	Date	Use	Description
		Flag of the Chakma Circle	
	1970–present	Stranded Pakistanis General Repatriation Committee	A vertical tricolour of white, green, and orange, with a white crescent and star in the center.

== Political flags ==
Flag	Duration	Use	Description
Current
	1971–present	Awami League	A green field containing four red stars, with a vertical red bar at the hoist.
	1978–present	Bangladesh Nationalist Party	Two horizontal bands of red and green, with an eight-toothed black cogwheel (diameter approx. half of the flag's height) in the centre. Superimposed over the top half of the cogwheel is a yellow rice plant below a white five-pointed star.
	1986–present	Jatiya Party (Ershad)	Two vertical bands of green and red with a yellow star in the middle.
	1990–present	Bangladesh Islami Front	A black field inscribed with the Arabic shahada with a vertical green bar at the hoist.
	1980–present	Socialist Party of Bangladesh	
	1980–present	Bangladesh Islami Chhatra Sena	Two horizontal bands of black and green with a white vertical bar on the hoist side.
		Islami Chattra Sena	
	1980–present	Revolutionary Student Unity	
	1975–present	Bangladesh Jamaat-e-Islami	
	1977–present	Bangladesh Islami Chhatrashibir	
	1990–present	Islamic Front Bangladesh	
	1972–present	Bangladesh Awami Jubo League	
	1978–present	Bangladesh Jatiotabadi Jubodal	
	1994–present	Bangladesh Awami Swechasebak League	
	2000–present	Krishak Sramik Janata League	
	1971–present	National Awami Party (Muzaffar)	
	2006–present	Bangladesh National Awami Party (Bhasani)	
		Jatiya Samajtantrik Dal	A red field with a yellow flame in the middle.
	1990–present	Ganatantri Party	Three horizontal stripes of green, white, and crimson.
	1972–present	Parbatya Chattagram Jana Samhati Samiti	A vertical bicolour of white and red, charged with a yellow star centred on the white portion.
	1971–present	Communist Party of Bangladesh	Red standard with a hammer and sickle on the upper hoist corner.
	1967–present	Communist Party of Bangladesh (Marxist–Leninist) (Barua)	
		Socialist Party of Bangladesh	
		Socialist Party of Bangladesh (Marxist)	
		Bangladesh Jatiya Samajtantrik Dal	
	1971–present	Jamiat Ulema-e-Islam Bangladesh	Nine horizontal stripes alternating black and white.
	1952–present	Bangladesh Students' Union	
	1995–present	Gano Front	
	1948–present	Bangladesh Chhatra League	
	1979–present	Bangladesh Jatiotabadi Chatra Dal	
	1980–present	Bangladesh Jatiotabadi Swechhasebak Dal	
	1983–present	Jatiya Chhatra Samaj	
	2006–present	Liberal Democratic Party (Bangladesh)	
	1976–present	Bangladesh Muslim League	Green standard with a star and crescent.
	2005–present	Bangladesh Tarikat Federation	
	2015–present	Trinomool BNP	
	2007–present	Bangladesh Kalyan Party	
	2004–present	Bikalpa Dhara Bangladesh	
	2013–present	Bangladesh Congress	
	2017–present	Nationalist Democratic Movement	
	1989–present	Zaker Party	
	2023–present	Bangladesh Supreme Party	
	2021–present	Gono Odhikar Parishad	
	2002–present	Ganosamhati Andolan	
	2012–present	Nagorik Oikko	
	2007–present	National People's Party	
	1997–present	Bangladesh Sangskritik Muktijote	
		Bangladesh Citizens Alliance	
		National Citizen Party	
		Bangladesh Khelafat Majlis	
		Khelafat Majlis	
		Bangladesh Khilafat Andolan	
		Nizam-e-Islam Party	
		Amar Bangladesh Party	
		Jatiya Ganotantrik Party	
		Bangladesh Development Party	
		Bangladesh Labour Party	
		Jatiya Samajtantrik Dal	
		Insaniyat Biplob Bangladesh	
		Islami Andolan Bangladesh	
		Jatiya Party (Manju)	
		Bangladesh Nationalist Front	
		Gano Forum	
		Bangladesh Muslim League (Bulbul)	
		Bangladesh Republican Party	
		Janatar Dol	
		Bangladesh Equal Right Party	
Former
	1972–?	Jatiya Samajtantrik Dal	A horizontal bicolour of yellow and red.
	1957–1967	National Awami Party	Red standard.
Other
		South Asian Communist banner	Red standard with a large hammer and sickle in the centre.

=== Separatist rebel movements ===
Flag	Date	Party	Description
	1972–2006	Shanti Bahini (armed wing)	A vertical bicolour of red and white, charged with a yellow star centred on the white portion.
	1973–2006	Bangabhumi	
	1998–present	United People's Democratic Front	
	2008–present	Kuki-Chin National Front	
	1997–present	Zomi Revolutionary Army	A red field charged with a yellow-edged green cross that extends to the edges.

== Historical flags ==
Flag	Date	Use	Description
	1971–1972	Flag of Provisional Government of the People's Republic of Bangladesh, used after independence too.	A flag with a green background, a red disk and a yellow map of the country in the middle.
	March – December 1971	Flag of Mukti Bahini (Liberation Forces)	A flag with a red background, a white disk and a hand holding a rifle-bayonet in the middle.
	1947–1971	Flag of Pakistan	Green flag with a white crescent and star on it, and a white band at the hoist. See List of Pakistani flags for more.
	1955–1971	Flag of the Governor of East Pakistan	
	1803–1947	Flag of the Presidency of Fort William (Bengal Presidency, later Bengal Province)	A Blue Ensign with the Union Flag at the canton, and the Bengal Presidency emblem displayed in the fly.
	1880–1947	Flag of the British Raj: A civilian flag used to represent British India internationally.	A Red Ensign with the Union Flag at the canton, and the Star of India displayed in the fly.
	1885–1947	Flag of the Viceroy of India	The Union Jack with the insignia of the Order of the Star of India beneath the Imperial Crown of India.
	1858–1947	The official state flag of the British Empire for use in India	The flag of the United Kingdom.
	1717–1757	Flag of the Bengal Subah	A white flag with three yellow barrels and a yellow-handled black sword.
	1576–1858	Flag of the Mughal Empire	Mughal Empire Alam that was primarily moss green.
	1231–1338	Flag of the Delhi Sultanate	According to the Catalan Atlas the flag of the Delhi Sultanate was a grey flag with a black strip towards the hoist of center.

== See also ==
- Emblem of Bangladesh
- National symbols of Bangladesh
