= Flag of Khyber Pakhtunkhwa =

KPK province
- Use: Civil and state flag
- Proportion: 2:3
- Adopted: 28 June 2011

The Flag of Khyber Pakhtunkhwa (Pashto: د خیبر پښتونخوا بیرغ) is the flag of the Province of Khyber Pakhtunkhwa within Pakistan. The KPK provincial flag shows Jamrud Fort, the guardian of the Khyber Pass and mountains in the back. Displaying Pakistani national colours, white and dark green, with a small crescent and star at the top to represent the Muslim-majority, all of which shows its Islamic heritage and strong ties with the Federation of Pakistan, and the inscription below in a scroll reads the official name of the province in Urdu, respectively. The most recent changes to the emblem involved adding a dove and laurel wreath to symbolise peace.

== History ==
Amb

Chitral

Dir

Swat

Waziristan resistance (1930s)

Waziristan resistance (1940s)

Islamic Emirate of Waziristan (2006)

Former Provincial flag

Tribal flag of Qabailistan (2018)

== Related pages ==
- Flag of Pakistan (Federal)
- Government of Khyber Pakhtunkhwa
- KPK emblem
- List of Pakistani flags
