= Flag of Punjab =

Flag of Punjab may refer to:

- Emblem of Punjab, India, a symbol of Punjab, state of India
- Flag of Punjab, Pakistan, a flag of Punjab, province of Pakistan
