= Flag of Balochistan, Pakistan =

Flag of a Pakistani state

Balochistan province
- Use: Civil and state flag
- Proportion: 2:3
- Adopted: 23 May 2005

The Flag of Balochistan (Urdu: پرچم بلوچستان; Balochi: بلوچستان ءِ بیرک; Pashto: د بلوچستان بیرغ; Dari: پرچم بلوچستان) is the flag of the province of Balochistan within Pakistan. The Balochistan provincial flag shows stylized mountains of the barren province and the principal mode of transport — the camel, also known as the "provincial animal".

== Other flags ==
First flag of Khanate of Kalat (–1947)

Second flag of Khanate of Kalat (1947–1955)

Flag of the Brahui people

Flag of Balochistan Liberation Army, unrecognized by Pakistan

Alternate flag of the Balochistan Liberation Army, unrecognized by Pakistan

Flag of Balochistan National Party
Flag of the State of Makran

Flag of the State of Kharan

Flag of the State of Las Bela

== Related pages ==
- Flag of Pakistan (Federal)
- Government of Balochistan, Pakistan
- Balochistan emblem
- List of Pakistani flags
