= Afzal Hossain (disambiguation) =

Afzal Hossain (born 1954) is a Bangladeshi actor, director, writer and painter.

Afzal Hossain also may refer to:

- Afzal Hossain (Patuakhali politician), incumbent Jatiya Sangsad member from Patuakhali-1 constituency
- Afzal Hossain (Narayanganj politician), former Jatiya Sangsad member from Dhaka-29 constituency
- Md. Afzal Hossain, incumbent Jatiya Sangsad member from Kishoreganj-5 constituency
- Master Afzal Hussain, Indian tailor
