= Syed Amir-uddin Kedwaii =

Pakistani independence activist (1901 – 1973)

- سید امیرالدین قدوائی
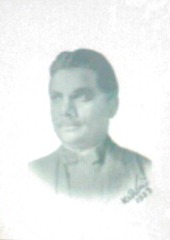
- Born: c. 1901; Barabanki, North-Western Provinces, British India (present-day Uttar Pradesh, India)
- Died: 21 August 1973 (aged 71–72); Lahore, Punjab, Pakistan
- Education: Aligarh University (LL.B.)
- Occupation: Barrister
- Known for: Designing the national flag of Pakistan
- Political party: All-India Muslim League (till 1947); Muslim League (1947 – 1948); Jamiat Ulema-e-Pakistan (1948 onwards)
- Movement: Pakistan Movement

Syed Amir-uddin Kedwaii (Note: Urdu: سید امیرالدین قدوائی) PMGM (1901 – 21 August 1973) was a Pakistani barrister, politician and independence activist, known for designing the national flag of Pakistan. He was posthumously awarded the 'Pakistan Movement Gold Medal' in 1991 by the government of Pakistan, for his efforts during the Pakistan Movement.

== Biography ==
Kedwaii was born in 1901 in Barabanki, North Western Provinces of British India. Kedwaii completed his LL.B at Aligarh University.

He started his political career as an activist of the Khilafat movement in the British Raj. He was a member of the Khilafat Committee and was later made its Chief Leader. Maulana Shaukat Ali used to call him "My Lieutenant". After the termination of the Khilafat Movement, Maulana Shaukat Ali laid the foundation for the Khuddam-e-Ka'aba Association in the British Raj, of which Kedwaii was appointed President of the United Provinces branch.

In 1922, Kedwaii, in the leadership of Allama Raghib Ahsan, created the All India Muslim Youth League of which he was the Secretary-General. There was a feeling of disappointment after the adoption of the Nehru Report by the All India Congress Committee, in 1928. Under such circumstances, the All India Muslim Conference was founded by the Muslims of the British Raj, whose president was Sir Aga Khan III. Kedwaii, started as a member and later became its Secretary.

Kedwaii joined the All-India Muslim League in 1936 and became a member of its Council in 1938. Kedwaii, along with his other companions in Aligarh, drafted the "Pakistan Scheme" on the basis of which the All India Muslim League developed the "Lahore Resolution" in 1940.

Kedwaii migrated to the Dominion of Pakistan as a Muhajir in 1947 and settled in Lahore. He remained the faculty member of the University of the Punjab's Law college and practiced law as a senior advocate.

Kedwaii was one of the founding members of Jamiat Ulema-e-Pakistan and participated in its meetings as its vice president.

Kedwaii had great spiritual affiliations with Data Ali Hajveri of Lahore. Because of this spiritual attachment, he remained in Lahore until his death on 21 August 1973.

In honour of his services in the Pakistan Movement, Kedwaii was awarded a posthumous Pakistan Movement Gold Medal in 1991 by the Government of Pakistan.
