= Presidential standard of Pakistan =

Official flag of the president of Pakistan

Presidential Standard (1998-present)

Presidential Standard (1974-1998)

Presidential Standard (1956-1967)

The Presidential Standard of Pakistan is the official flag of the president of Pakistan.

== Design ==
The Presidential Standard consists of the background of the flag of Pakistan with the gold presidential crest replacing the white crescent and star found in the flag of Pakistan. The presidential crest consists of a smaller crescent and star flanked by wheat branches with the words "Pakistan" written in Urdu underneath.

== Use ==
The Presidential Standard is displayed only in the presence of the president of Pakistan, particularly in the office and official residence of the president of Pakistan. It is always displayed alongside the flag of Pakistan. It is also flown alongside the flag of Pakistan in the presidential motorcade. The Presidential Standard is never flown atop any building.

== History ==
The Presidential Standard was first adopted in 1956 and has since been redesigned twice: in 1974 and 1998.

| Flag | Usage period | Description |
|---|---|---|
| | 1998–present | The crescent and star surrounded by wheat branches on a green and white Pakistan flag background, with the Urdu name for Pakistan below. |
| | 1974–1998 | The crescent and star surrounded by wheat branches on a green field, with the Urdu name for Pakistan below. |
| | 1956–1967 | The crescent and star surrounded by wheat branches on a blue field, with the Urdu name for Pakistan below. |

== See also ==
- List of Pakistani flags
- Coat of arms of Pakistan
- National Anthem of Pakistan
