= Flag of Punjab, Pakistan =

Province of Punjab
- Use: Civil and state flag
- Proportion: 2:3
- Adopted: 1 July 1970

The flag of Punjab (Punjabi: پنجاب دا جھنڈا, Urdu: پرچم پنجاب) is the official flag of the Pakistani province of Punjab. It uses the same colours as the national flag of Pakistan, dark green and white. The emblem of the province representing the five rivers of the Punjab region, a Pakistani flag and crescent and wheat of the fertile region, forms the centre of the flag with "Government of Punjab" written in Punjabi (Shahmukhi).

== Design ==
The Punjab provincial flag is green and shows the provincial emblem in the centre which reflects Punjab's natural resources like its wheat crop, and the five rivers which give the province its name in Persian (from Punj : five, Aab : waters). The inscription below in a crescent scroll reads Government of Punjab in Shahmukhi script of Punjabi. The flag uses the Pakistani national colours, white and dark green, colors that reflect the Islamic heritage of Pakistan.

== Old emblems ==
During the British Raj, the undivided province of Punjab was granted a coat of arms. These arms consisted of a purple shield charged with a sun rising over five rivers in silver. The motto translated as "Let it grow from the rivers" The name "Punjab" means land of five rivers.

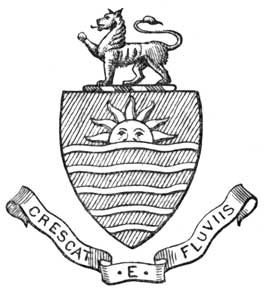
Coat of Arms of Punjab Province (British India)

== See also ==
- Government of Punjab
- Flag of Pakistan
- List of Pakistani flags
