= List of Pakistani flags =

Flags used in Pakistan

This is a list of flags used in Pakistan.

== National flag ==
Flag	Date	Use	Description
	1947–present	National flag of Pakistan	A white star and crescent on a dark green field, with a vertical white stripe at the hoist. The tips of the moon and star point towards the upper fly corner.
	1947–present	National flag of Pakistan (vertical)	When displayed vertically, the white stripe is placed at the top and the star and crescent point towards the bottom right.

== Government flags ==
Flag	Date	Use	Description
	1947–present	Standard of the president of Pakistan	The crescent and star surrounded by wheat branches on a green field, with the Urdu name for Pakistan below, with a white side.
	1974–1998	Standard of the president of Pakistan	The crescent and star surrounded by wheat branches on a green field, with the Urdu name for Pakistan below.
	1956–1967	Standard of the president of Pakistan	The crescent and star surrounded by wheat branches on a blue field, with the Urdu name for Pakistan below.
	1954–present	Standard of the prime minister of Pakistan	
	?–present	Flag of the Supreme Court of Pakistan	Emblem of the Supreme Court of Pakistan in gold on green field with gold side.
	?–present	Flag of the Pakistan Federal Shariat Court	Emblem of the Pakistan Federal Shariat Court in gold with white crescent and star and book on green field with white side.
	1953–1956	Standard of the governor-general of Pakistan	The governor-general flag of Pakistan was used from 1953 until 1956.
	1947–1953	Standard of the governor-general of Pakistan	The flag from 1947 to 1956, the governor-general of Pakistan used a dark blue flag bearing the royal crest (a lion standing on the Crown), beneath which was the word 'PAKISTAN' in gold majuscules. The same design is still used by many other governors-general. This last flag was the personal flag of the governor-general only. This flag was used from 1947 until 1952.

== Civil ensign ==
Flag	Date	Use	Description
	1947–present	Civil ensign of Pakistan	A red ensign with the flag of Pakistan in the canton influenced by the Red Ensign

== Civil air ensign ==
Flag	Date	Use	Description
	?–present	Civil air ensign of Pakistan	An ensign with the flag of Pakistan in the canton influenced by the British design

== Provincial and territorial flags ==
Flag	Date	Use	Description
Current provinces
	2005–present	Flag of Sindh	A traditional green flag, with the provincial emblem in the centre.
	1970–present	Flag of Punjab	A traditional green flag, with the provincial emblem in the centre. The emblem reflects Punjab's natural resources: its wheat, and the five rivers which give the province its name in Persian (from Punj = Five, Aab = Waters).
	2011–present	Flag of Khyber Pakhtunkhwa	A traditional green flag, with the provincial emblem on the flag shows the Jamrud fort which guards the Khyber Pass, and mountains in the back.
	2005–present	Flag of Balochistan	A traditional green flag, with the provincial emblem in the centre. The emblem shows stylised mountains of this barren province and the principal mode of transport: the Dromedary camel, also the provincial animal of Balochistan.
	2011–present	Flag of Gilgit-Baltistan	A traditional green flag, with the provincial emblem on the flag showing the Baltit Fort and the Skardu Fort which guards the Himalayas (including K2), the designated national peak in the back.
	1975–present	Flag of Azad Kashmir	The flag displays the Pakistani national colours, white and dark green, with a crescent and star to represent the Muslim majority, and a saffron square to represent the Buddhist, Hindu, Sikh, and other minorities of the disputed region, the colours are clearly influenced by the Mughal Empire. The four white stripes symbolise the main rivers of the Kashmir region; Indus, Jhelum, Chenab and Ravi. It also represents the five geographic divisions of the disputed territory, Baltistan, Gilgit, Jammu, the Kashmir Valley and Ladakh.
Former provinces
	1901–1955 1970–2010	Flag of North-West Frontier Province	A traditional green flag, with the provincial emblem in the centre. The emblem shows a castle and a crescent moon. Underneath it are the letters NWFP – an abbreviation of the province.
	2011–2018	Flag of Federally Administered Tribal Areas	A traditional green flag, with the provincial emblem in the centre. The emblem shows a castle and two swords. Underneath it are the letters FATA – an abbreviation of the province.

== City flags ==
Flag	Date	Use	Description
	?–present	Flag of Karachi	
	?–present	Flag of Lahore	
	?–present	Flag of Faisalabad	
	?–present	Flag of Hyderabad	
	?–present	Flag of Peshawar	
	?–present	Flag of Quetta	
	?–present	Flag of Islamabad	
	?–present	Flag of Sargodha	

== Military ==
Flag	Date	Use	Description
	?–present	Flag of the Pakistan Armed Forces	
	?–present	Flag of the Pakistan Army	A version of the flag of Pakistan, with the Army's badge
	?–present	Ensign of the Pakistan Air Force	A light blue ensign with the flag of Pakistan in the canton, and the Air Force's roundel
	?–present	Naval jack of the Pakistan Navy	The Navy's badge on a blue field
	?–present	Standard of the Pakistan Navy	The Navy's badge defaced on the national flag
	?–present	Ensign of the Pakistan Navy	National flag, but with ratio: 1:2
	?–present	Flag of the Pakistan Coast Guards	
	2025–present	Standard of the chief of defence forces	Trimmed with green, white, red, yellow, dark blue, and light blue intermingled fringe; the national flag with which it is displayed has green and white intermingled fringe.
	?–present	Flag of the chief of the army staff	

=== Air Force rank flags ===
Flag	Date	Use	Description
	?–present	Flag of the air marshal	
	?–present	Flag of the vice air marshal	

=== Naval rank flags ===
Flag	Date	Use	Description
	?–present	Flag of the admiral of the fleet	
	?–present	Flag of the admiral	
	?–present	Flag of the vice-admiral	
	?–present	Flag of the rear-admiral	
	?–present	Flag of the commodore	
	?–present	Flag of the senior officer afloat	

=== Manoeuvre corps ===
Flag	Date	Use	Description
	?–present	Flag of the I Corps	A horizontal triband of red, white, and red with a diagonal yellow lightning bolt at the centre.
	?–present	Flag of the IV Corps	
	?–present	Flag of the X Corps	
	?–present	Flag of the V Corps	
	?–present	Flag of the XI Corps	A horizontal triband of red, white, and red with a black triangle in the middle, itself containing a red circle in its centre.

=== Others ===
Flag	Date	Use	Description
	?–present	Flag of the Army Air Defence Command	A horizontal bicolour of black and yellow with a symbol on the middle.
	?–present	Flag of the Northern Light Infantry Regiment	

== Historical flags ==
=== Pre-colonial states ===
Flag	Date	Use	Description
	Mid-4th century BC – 321 BC	Flag of the Nanda Empire (reconstructed)	An orange and blue Nanda standard with an ashoka chakra being centred.
	321 BC – 185 BC	Flag of the Mauryan Empire (reconstructed)	An orange-white-brown standard with a swastika being centred
	30–375	Flag of the Kushan Empire (reconstructed)	A green-white standard with a different variant of trishula being centred.
	240–750	Flag of the Gupta Empire	An orange standard with a dharmachakra being centred.
	711–750	Flag of the Umayyad Caliphate	The white Umayyad standard.
	750–945	Flag of the Abbasid Caliphate	The black Abbasid banner.
	1269–1596	Flag of the Delhi Sultanate according to the Catalan Atlas (1375)	A dark grey flag with a black strip to the hoist of centre.
	1510–1524	Flag of the Safavid dynasty	A plain green flag with a yellow circle on the top.
	1524–1576	Flag of the Safavid dynasty	According to Encyclopedia Britannica.
	1729–1736	Flag of the Safavid dynasty	
	1526–1858	Flags of the Mughal Empire	Mughal Empire flag that was primarily moss green with a sun (Alam)
	1526–1858	Flags of the Mughal Empire	Mughal Empire Alam that was primarily moss green with a Sun and Lion.
	1674–1740	Flags of the Maratha Empire (Bhagwa Dhwaj)	Saffron-coloured, with a swallowtail fly.
	1740–1818	Flags of the Maratha Empire (Bhagwa Dhwaj)	An ashokachakra was added to the Bhagwa Dhwaj.
		Flag of the Hotak dynasty	
	1716–1799	Flag of the Sikh Confederacy	
		Flag of Afsharid Iran	The standard of Nader Shah.
	1783–1856	Flag of the Omani Empire in Gwadar	A white field with red Arabic script below a red sword pointed to the right.
	1799–1849	Flag of the Sikh Empire (Nishan Sahib)	
	1818–1842	Flag of the Durrani Empire	A horizontal triband of green, white, and green.
	1856–1958	Flag of the Sultanate of Muscat and Oman in Gwadar	A simple red field.
	1880–1882	Flag of the Emirate of Afghanistan	The standard of Abdur Rahman Khan.

=== British India ===
Flag	Date	Use	Description
	1858–1947	The official state flag of the British Empire for use in India	The flag of the United Kingdom.
	1885–1947	Flag of the viceroy of India	The Union Jack with the insignia of the Order of the Star of India beneath the Imperial Crown of India.
	1880–1947	Flag of the British Raj: A civilian flag used to represent British India internationally.	A Red Ensign with the Union Flag at the canton, and the Star of India displayed in the fly.

=== Princely states of Pakistan ===
Flag	Date	Use	Description
	1666–1955	Flag of the Khanate of Kalat	
	1853–1955	Flag of the State of Khairpur	
	1748–1955	Flag of the State of Bahawalpur	
	?–1947	Flag of the State of Chitral	
	1849–1969	Flag of the State of Swat	
	?–1974	Flag of the State of Hunza	
	1507–1971	Flag of the Kingdom of Amb	
	?–1969	Flag of the State of Dir	
	1742–1955	Flag of the State of Las Bela	
	1697–1955	Flag of the State of Kharan	

== Political flags ==
=== Political parties: former and current ===
Flag	Date	Use	Description
Active
	1996–present	Flag of Pakistan Tehreek-e-Insaf	A horizontal bicolour of green and red, with a star and crescent on the middle.
	1993–present	Flag of the Pakistan Muslim League (N)	A plain green flag with a white crescent and star at the fly and a tiger at the hoist, facing the crescent.
	1967–present	Flag of the Pakistan People's Party	A vertical tricolour of red, black, and green, with a white crescent and star in the black stripe.
	2002–present	Flag of the Muttahida Majlis-e-Amal	A plain white flag with a dark green crescent in the centre. The takbir is written in the crescent and the Urdu name of the party is written below it.
	2016–present	Flag of Muttahida Qaumi Movement – Pakistan	A vertical tricolour consisting of a red stripe, a narrower green stripe, and the remainder – about half the length – in white.
	2002–present	Flag of the Pakistan Muslim League (Q)	A plain green flag with a white crescent and star in the centre.
	1986–present	Flag of the Awami National Party	A plain red flag with the white text "ANP" in the centre.
	1996–present	Flag of the Pashtunkhwa Milli Awami Party	A vertical tricolour of orange-red, white, and green, with an orange-red star in the centre.
	2003–present	Flag of the National Party	A vertical bicolour of 1/3 green and 2/3 red. There are four stars on the four corners of the red field.
	1996–present	Flag of the Balochistan National Party	A horizontal tricolour of red, yellow, and green.
	2018–present	Flag of the Balochistan Awami Party	A vertical triband of green, white, and green, with a green crescent and star in the centre.
	2018–2025	Flag of the Grand Democratic Alliance	A white star on a green field, with a white side.
	2025–present	Flag of the Grand Democratic Alliance	A white star on a green field.
	2008–present	Flag of the Awami Muslim League Pakistan	A plain green flag with a white crescent and star in the centre and a small "AML" on the bottom fly.
	1990–present	Flag of the Jamhoori Wattan Party	A horizontal bicolour of red and green, with two white stars on the red and two white stars on the green.
	2008–2012	Flag of the Baloch Republican Party	A horizontal bicolour of red and green, overlaid by a blue triangle at the hoist containing a white star.
	1986–present	Flag of Jamiat Ahle Hadith	The Shahada on a green field, with a white side.
	2015–present	Flag of the Pasban-e-Pakistan	A red star on a white circle on a red field, with a white side.
	2012–present	Flag of the Awami Workers Party	A white star on a red field, with a white side. The name of the party is written below the star in Urdu.
	2018–present	Flag of the Barabri Party Pakistan	A vertical tricolour of green, yellow (extra wide), and red with a red equals sign in the centre.
	1945–present	Flag used by Jamiat Ulema-e-Islam and its branches (Jamiat Ulema-e-Islam (S), Jamiat Ulema-e-Islam – (F))	A flag with five horizontal black stripes and four horizontal white stripes.
	1996–present	Flag of the Jamote Qaumi Movement	A vertical tricolour of blue, red, and green, with a white crescent and star in the centre.
	1989–present	Flag of the Pakistan Awami Tehreek	A horizontal tricolour of red, white, and green.
	2015–present	Flag of Pakistan Justice and Democratic Party	A vertical tricolour of red, blue, and green, with a white crescent and star on the green stripe.
	1997–present	Flag of the Pakistan Peoples Party (Shaheed Bhutto)	A vertical tricolour of red, black, and green, with a black fist on a sword on the black section of the flag.
	2012–present	Flag of Qaumi Watan Party	A vertical tricolour of red, black, and white.
	2006–present	Flag of the Sindh United Party	A vertical bicolour of 1/3 white and 2/3 red.
	2002–present	Flag of the All Pakistan Minorities Alliance	A vertical tricolour of red, white, and blue.
	1970–present	Flag of Qaumi Awami Tahreek	A vertical triband of red, black, and red, with a white star in the centre of the black band.
	2010–present	Flag of the Bahawalpur National Awami Party	A horizontal tricolour of red, yellow, and green, with a black isosceles trapezium at the hoist containing a white star and crescent.
	1992–present	Flag of the Mohajir Qaumi Movement – Haqiqi	A vertical tricolour of red, green, and white, with the red text مہاجر (Mohajir) being written on the white side which covers half of the flag.
	2009–present	Flag of the Sunni Ittihad Council	
	2016–present	Flag of Allah-o-Akbar Tehreek	A red flag with the name of the party being written in the centre in gold.
	2021–present	Flag of the National Democratic Movement	A vertical bicolour of black and red.
	2015–present	Flag of Tehreek-e-Labbaik Pakistan	A plain green flag with لبيك يا رسول اللهﷺ (At your service, O messenger of Allah (SAW)) centred near the top and the name of the party written below in Urdu.
	2015–present	Election flag of Tehreek-e-Labbaik Pakistan	A horizontal triband of green, white, and green with a vertical black stripe at the hoist and the black text "TLP" in the white band.
	2023–present	Flag of the Istehkam-e-Pakistan Party	A green field with a white crescent and star at the fly, with a white-bordered red triangle issuing from the hoist.
	2023–present	Flag of the Pakistan Tehreek-e-Insaf Parliamentarians	A horizontal triband of green, red, and green, with a small white crescent and star in the centre of the red band.
	2024–present	Flag of Awaam Pakistan	
	2026–present	Flag of the Pakistan Awaam Raaj Tehreek	
	1968–present	Flag of the Mazdoor Kisan Party	Plain red field with a white star in the centre.
	1985–present	Flag of the Pakistan Christian Congress	A vertical tricolour of red, yellow, and green, with a red cross in the yellow band.
	1991–present	Flag of the Sindh Taraqi Pasand Party	A vertical tricolour of blue, white, and orange-red, with an orange-red eight-sided star in the centre.
	2002–present	Flag of the Pakistan Green Party	A horizontal bicolour of yellow and green.
	1929–present	Flag of Majlis-e Ahrar-e Islam	A flag with two vertical sections, the hoist section with six white and six black horizontal stripes, and the fly section with a plain red background with a hoist-facing star and crescent.
	2002–present	Flag used by the Communist Party of Pakistan and Communist Party of Pakistan (Thaheem)	Red banner with a white hammer and sickle in the centre.
	2008–present	Flag of the Gilgit-Baltistan United Movement	A vertical bicolour of red and green, with a swastika on the green section.
	1970(?)–present	Flag of the All Jammu and Kashmir Muslim Conference	A plain green flag with a white crescent in the centre and below it is an ideological expression written in diacritics: کشِمیَر بنے گا پاَکستان (Kashmir will become part of Pakistan).
	2012–present	Flag of Islami Tehreek Pakistan	A black field with a red vertical stripe at the hoist. On the black field, the takbir is written in the shape of a khamsa at the top, and written below it is the name of the party in Urdu.
	1990–present	Flag of the Jammu Kashmir Peoples Party	A diagonal bicolour of green and red, with a white chinar leaf in the centre.
	1990–present	Flag of Pakistan Peoples Party Workers	
	1985–present	Flag of Pakistan Muslim League (F)	
	1985–1988	Flag of Rah-e-Haq	A green field with a white crescent and star, with a vertical stripe at the hoist made of nine alternating horizontal stripes of black and white.
	2012–present	Flag of Pakistan Rah-e-Haq Party	A green field with a white crescent and star, with a vertical stripe at the hoist made of nine alternating horizontal stripes of black and white.
Former
	1906–1947	Flag of the All-India Muslim League	A plain green flag with a white crescent and star in the centre.
	1930–1970s	Flag of the Sindh Hari Committee	A plain red flag with a sickle and star symbol.
	1931–1970s	Flag of the Khaksar movement	A modified Ottoman flag on a red background with a white crescent and star in the upper hoist. The star is dividing the flag into four sections and the numbers ۱۳ (13) and ۷۰ (70) are written on two sections and اخوت (Brotherhood) is written (with diacritics) on the fly section.
	1950–1971	Flag of the All Pakistan Awami League	A vertical bicolour of 1/3 white and 2/3 green with four white stars on the four corners of the green side.
	1953–1957	Flag of the Ganatantri Dal	A horizontal bicolour of red and blue.
	1970–2012	Flag of Tehreek-e-Istiqlal	A horizontal triband of blue, red, and blue.
	1979–2000	Flag of Tehreek-e-Jafaria	A horizontal tricolour of black, red, and green.
	1986–2013	Flag of the National People's Party	A horizontal tricolour of green, white, and red, with four red stars in the white stripe.
	1988–1990	Flag of the Islami Jamhuri Ittihad	A green flag with nine white stars arranged in a square grid.
	1989–2017	Flag of Sindh National Front	
	1990–2010s	Flag of the Pakistan Hindu Party	A plain Saffron flag.
	1995–2015	Flag of the Communist Mazdoor Kissan Party	A plain red flag with a white hammer and sickle in the middle and the golden text "CMKP" written below.
	1997–2004	Flag of the Millat Party	A diagonal bicolour of red and green, with a white crescent and star in the centre.
	2010–2012	Flag of the Workers Party Pakistan	A red flag with four white stars along the top.
	2012–2015	Flag of the Awami Jamhuri Ittehad Pakistan	A horizontal bicolour of green and white, with the white text "AJIP" in the upper band.
	2016–2023	Flag of the Pak Sarzameen Party	A vertical tricolour of primarily red towards the fly and green and blue at the hoist.
	2018–2023	Flag of the Awami Raj Party	A horizontal tricolour of white, green, and yellow, with a white crescent and star in the centre.
	2018–2023	Flag of the Pakistan Tehreek-e-Insaf (Gulalai)	A vertical bicolour of red and white, with a white crescent and star in the red band.

=== Opposition/rebel flags ===
Flag	Date	Use	Description
	2007–present	Flags of the Tehreek-e-Taliban-e-Pakistan	A plain white field with the full Shahada written in black across the top; below, the name of the party in Urdu is written with diacritics in black along with a black sword below it.
	2007–present	Flags of the Tehreek-e-Taliban-e-Pakistan	A inverted variant of the flag of the Islamic State, a plain white flag with the black text لا إله إلا الله (There is no God but Allah), with a black circle below it containing the white text محمد رسول الله (Muhammad is the messenger of Allah).
	1992–present	Flag of Tehreek-e-Nafaz-e-Shariat-e-Mohammadi	A black field with a white circle in the centre.
	2004–present	Flag of Lashkar-e-Islam	A plain black field with the name of the organisation in Urdu written in white in the centre.
	1996–2025	Flag of Lashkar-e-Jhangvi	A flag divided into two sections. The top part has three white and three black horizontal stripes. The lower section of the flag is a plain red field with فقاتلو لمتہ الکفر (Fight the leaders of disbelief), from Surah at-Tawbah, verse 12, written in white and a sword below in the centre.
	?–present	Flag of the Sipah-e-Sahaba Pakistan	A flag with five horizontal black stripes and four horizontal white stripes in the top hoist and a plain red section in the lower hoist; the rest is a green field with a crescent moon and a star that has محّمدرسولﷲﷺ (Muhammad is the messenger of Allah, Peace be upon him) written in the centre. Written in the rays of the star are: ابوبکر صدیق رضی الله تعالیٰ عنه, عمر فاروق رضی الله تعالیٰ عنه, عثمان غنی رضي الله تعالیٰ عنه, علی المرتضیٰ رضي الله تعالیٰ عنه, امیر معاویہ رضی الله تعالیٰ عنه
	1997–present	Flag of the Turkistan Islamic Party	A blue flag with the Shahada in white and a white crescent and star below it.
	2000s–present	Flag used by rebels groups in Pakistan including: Islamic State – Khorasan Province, Jundallah (Pakistan), Islamic Movement of Uzbekistan	A plain black flag with the white text لا إله إلا الله (There is no God but Allah), with a white circle below it containing the black text محمد رسول الله (Muhammad is the messenger of Allah).
	1988–present	Flag used by rebel groups including: al-Qaeda, Jamaat-ul-Ahrar, Islamic Movement of Uzbekistan	A plain black flag with the Shahada written in white on it.
	2000s–present	Flag of various Balochi separatist groups including: Balochistan Liberation Army, Baluch Liberation Front, Lashkar-e-Balochistan, Baloch Nationalist Army	A horizontal bicolour of green and red, overlaid by a blue triangle at the hoist containing a white star.
		Flag of various Sindhi separatist groups including: Sindhudesh Liberation Army, Sindhudesh Revolutionary Army	A plain red flag with a white disc in the centre, with a black hand holding a black axe inside the disc.

== Flag proposals ==
=== National flag proposals ===
Flag	Date	Use	Description
	1940	Choudhry Rahmat Ali's proposed flag for a 'Pak Commonwealth of Nations'	A plain green field with a small white crescent in the upper hoist and ten white stars on the fly and bottom, in a grid formation.
	1942	"The Millat of Islam and the menace of 'Indianism'", a pamphlet by Choudhry Rahmat Ali	A plain green field with a thin white crescent at the hoist and a ring of five white stars in the fly.
	1947	Lord Mountbatten's proposed flag for Pakistan	The flag of the All-India Muslim League with a small Union Jack in the canton.

=== Provincial and territorial proposals ===
Flag	Date	Use	Description
	September 19, 2004	Proposed and unofficial flag of the Islamabad Capital Territory by Dr. Tariq Saleem Marwat	A diagonal tricolour. A triangle of green in the upper fly half, containing a white star and crescent; a stripe of white followed by black in the lower hoist half. The diagonal design differentiates it from the national flag. The square shape makes the triangles symmetric. Black is added to give it a distinct look. Black was the colour used for the flag at the time of Muhammad's conquest of Mecca.

== See also ==
- National Flag of Pakistan
