= Master Afzal Hussain =

Pakistani tailor

Master Afzal Hussain ماسٹر افضال حسین
- Born: Delhi, India
- Died: 15 7 1987; Karachi, Pakistan
- Occupation: Tailor
- Known for: Stitching the first flag of Pakistan
- Title: Baba-e-Parcham

Master Afzal Hussain, (ماسٹر افضال حسین) also known as Baba-e-Parcham (which means "Father of the Flag"), was a tailor from Delhi. Together with his younger brother, Altaf Hussain, he stitched the very first flag of Pakistan two months before the country's independence. Even though he played an important role in the country's history, Master Afzal's story is not well-known, and his family continues to live in poverty without any help from the government.

== Early life and career ==
Master Afzal Hussain was a dedicated participant in the Pakistan Movement and had a tailoring shop in Delhi. His shop was frequented by well-known politicians and leaders of the Pakistan Movement who came to get sherwanis (traditional clothing) tailored. After moving to Pakistan, he decided to live a simple life in Karachi, allowing his significant contributions to the country to be forgotten over time.

== Recognition ==
Afzal's contributions were acknowledged later in his life, by the efforts of a well-known scholar Hakim Mohammad Saeed. This led President General Zia-ul-Haq to announce the Pride of Performance Award for Master Afzal.

== Controversy ==
His dilapidated grave in the area of New Karachi gained attention on social media.
