= Side (heraldry) =

Side (Fr. Flanc dextre)

Side sinister (Fr. Flanc sénestre)

The side, or flank (Fr. flanc), is a heraldic ordinary resembling a pale that has been displaced (glissé) to either the dexter or sinister edge of the field. Pierre-Barthélemy Gheusi, following M. Aug. Tailhades, groups the sides (flanc dextre and flanc sénestre) with the chief and base (and bordure) as ordinaries (pièces honorables) that are affixed to an edge of the field by their longest side.

The use of the term side to refer to the ordinary (or division of the field) is not to be confused with the use of the term to refer to regions or edges of the field or points of an escutcheon—the dexter and sinister sides or points flanc dextre and flanc sénestre. In English, sides as charges are typically referred to as ‘sides sinister’ or ‘sides dexter’, in contradistinction to the ‘sinister side’ and ‘dexter side’ as edges or portions of the field.

In some heraldic traditions, such as the English, it is specified that the side extend not more than one-sixth of the width of the field; in others, such as the French, it may extend to up to one-third the width of the field.

Like other heraldic ordinaries—such as the pale, fess, chief, bend, base, or pile—the side is possessed of a fundamental ambiguity: it can be conceived as alternately a charge or as a division of the field. As with any principal charge, the side can bear another charge or a group of charges. Its edge can also be modified by variations of line. It can be modified by variations of the field as well.

== Gallery ==
=== Coats of arms ===
==== Side ====
Březová-Oleško, Czech Republic

Pusula, Finland

Longkamp, Germany

Werra-Meißner-Kreis, Germany

==== Side sinister ====
Kempele, Finland

Parikkala, Finland

Kreis Schwerin-Land, Germany

Soportújar, Granada, Spain

=== On flags ===
==== Side (hoistward) on flags ====
Flag of Terengganu (1912 - 1933)

Flag of Ajman, UAE

Flag of the first three Saudi states, 1744-1913 (hoist at right)

Flag of Pakistan

Flag of Umm al-Qaiwain, United Arab Emirates

Flag of the Russian Soviet Socialist Republic, USSR (1954–1991)

House style (logo) flag of the Government of the Netherlands

Flag of the Australian Capital Territory

Flag of the Northern Territory, Australia

Flag of Portugal

Sámi flag

Flag of Norman, Oklahoma, US

Flag of Topeka, Kansas, US

Flag of Benin

Flag of Madagascar

Flag of Texas, United States

Flag of North Carolina, US

Flag of Laredo, Texas, US, and historic Flag of the Republic of the Rio Grande

Flag of Chechen Republic, Russia

Flag of Belarus

Flag of the United Arab Emirates

Flag of the South African Republic (1857–74, 1875–77, 1881–1902, and 1914–1915)

Flag of the Republic of Yucatán

Flag of the Sultanate of Oman

Morning Star flag

Flag of the Valencian Community, Spain

Flag of Mallorca, Balearic Islands, Spain

Flag of Salerno, Campania, Italy

===== Charges in pale, hoistward side =====
Flag of Mongolia

Former flag of the Democratic Republic of the Congo (1997–2003)

===== Charges on hoistward side =====
Flag of Orellana Province, Ecuador

Finchfield village flag, England, United Kingdom

Flag of Laredo, Texas, US, and historic Flag of the Republic of the Rio Grande

Flag of Maricopa County, Arizona, US

==== Side sinister (flyward) on flags ====
Flag of Brest, France (XVth century)

Flag of Brest, France (XVIth century)

Third flag of the Confederate States of America (1865)

Flag of Isère, France

Flag of Vologda Oblast, Russia

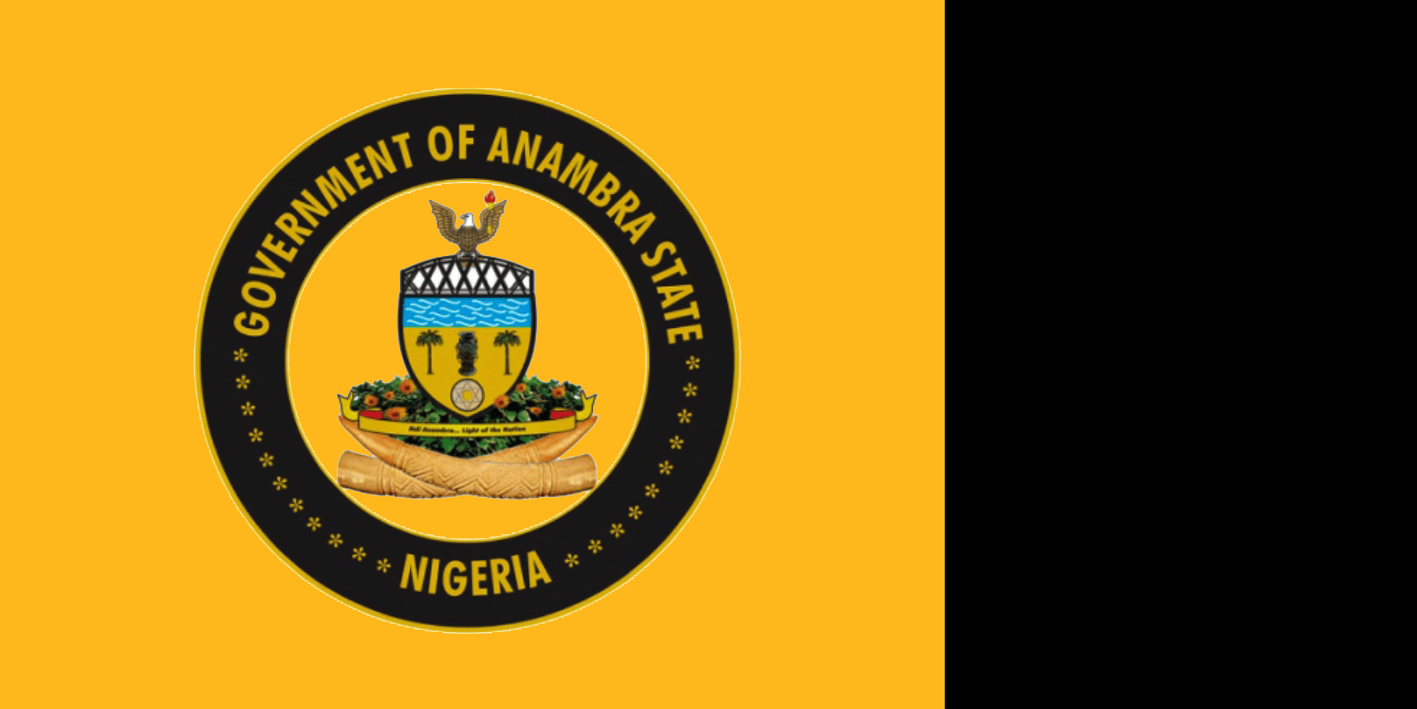
Flag of Anambra State, Nigeria

Flag of Prachinburi Province, Thailand

Flag of Tennessee, United States

===== Charges on flyward side =====
Flag of the Canadian Coast Guard

Flag of Alameda County, California, United States

== See also ==
- Ordinary (heraldry)
- Charge (heraldry)
- Liste de pièces héraldiques
