= Flags of the Mughal Empire =

Banners and standards of the South Asian early modern empire

The Mughal Empire had a number of imperial flags and standards. The principal imperial standard of the Mughals was known as the alam (Alam علم). It was primarily moss green. It displayed a lion and sun (Shēr-ō-khurshīd شیر و خورشید) facing the hoist of the flag. The Mughals traced their use of the alam back to Timur.

Flag as seen in a ca.1840 illustration

Flag featuring "crouching lion"

The imperial standard was displayed to the right of the throne and also at the entrance of the Emperor's encampment and in front of the emperor during military marches.

According to the Ain-i-Akbari, during Akbar's reign, whenever the emperor rode out, not less than five alams were carried along with the qur (a collection of flags and other insignia) wrapped up in scarlet cloth bags. They were unfurled on the days of festivity, and in battle. Edward Terry, chaplain to Sir Thomas Roe, who came during the reign of Jahangir, described in his Voyage to East-India (1655) that the royal standard, made of silk, with a crouching lion shadowing part of the body of the sun inscribed on it, was carried on an elephant whenever the emperor travelled.

A painting by Payag in a manuscript of the Padshahnama, a chronicle on Shah Jahan's reign, preserved in the Royal Library, Windsor Castle depicted the Mughal standards as the scarlet pennons with green borders with a passant lion and rising sun behind it. Another painting in the same manuscript depicted the Mughal standards having green fields with a couchant lion and rising sun behind it.

== Seals ==
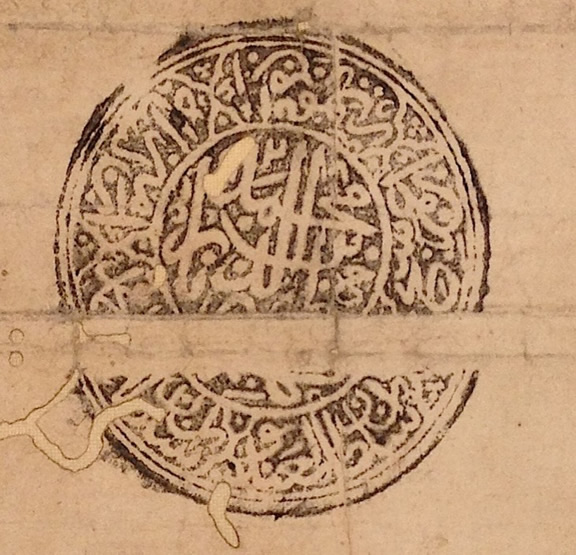
Seal of Babur

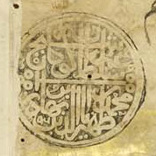
Seal of Babur

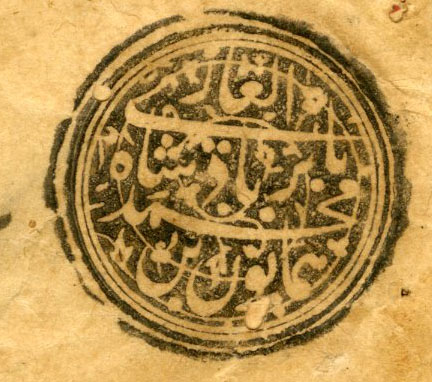
Seal of Humayun

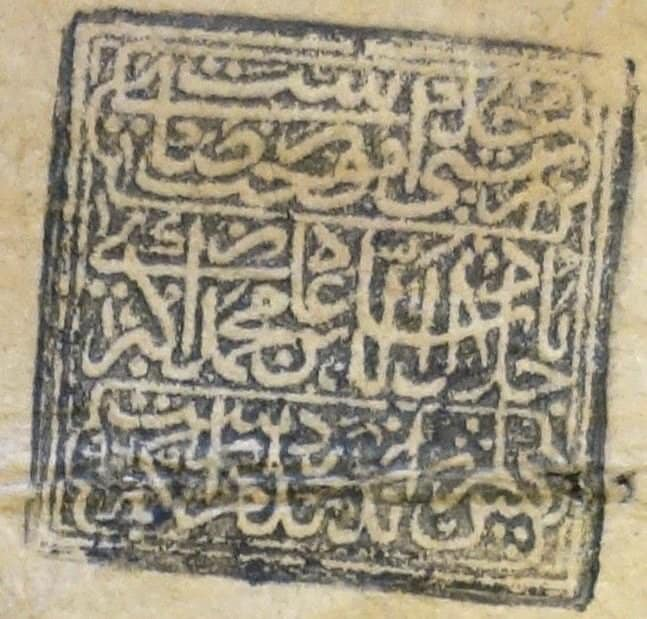
Seal of Akbar

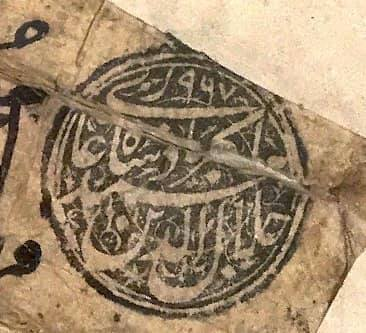
Seal of Akbar

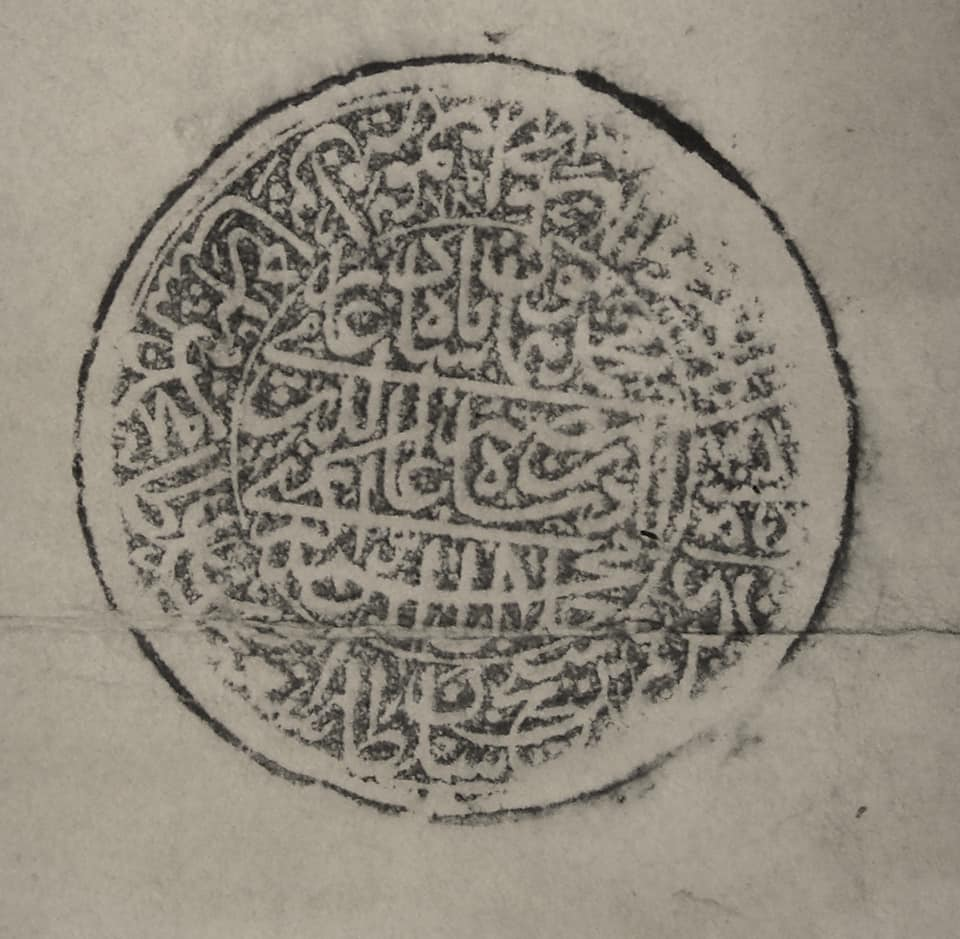
Seal of Akbar

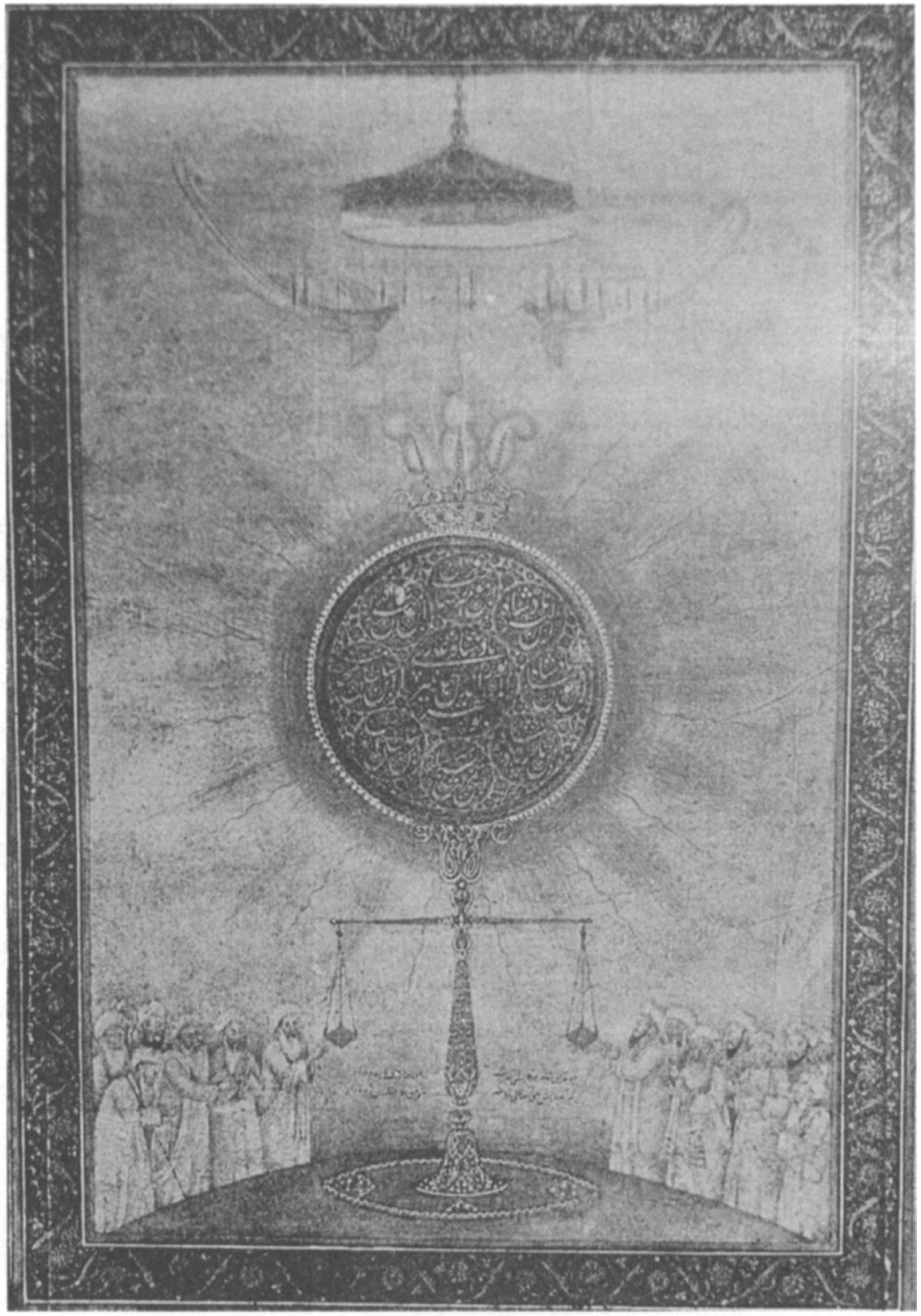
Seal of Jahangir

Seal of Jahangir

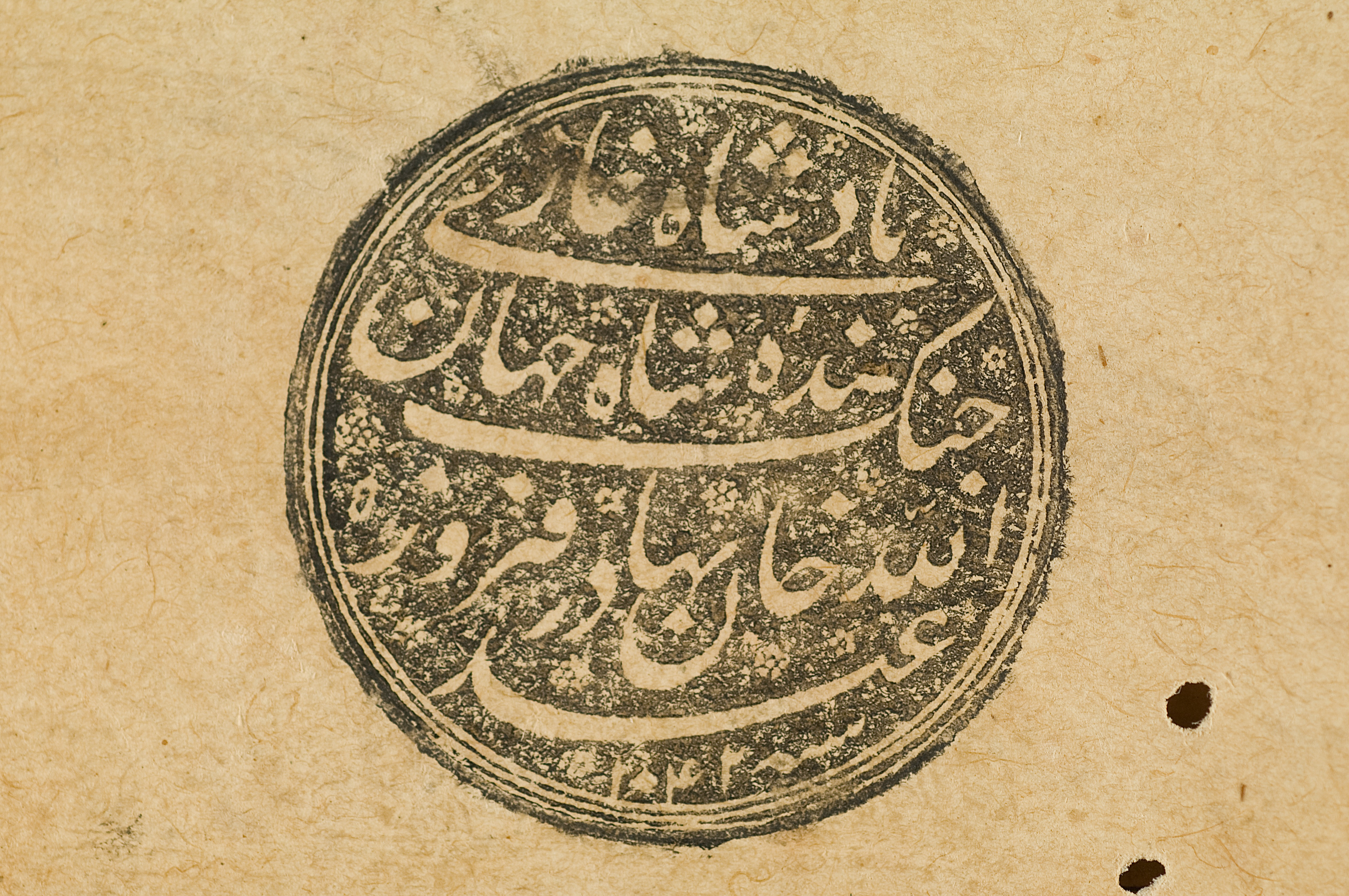
Seal of Jahangir

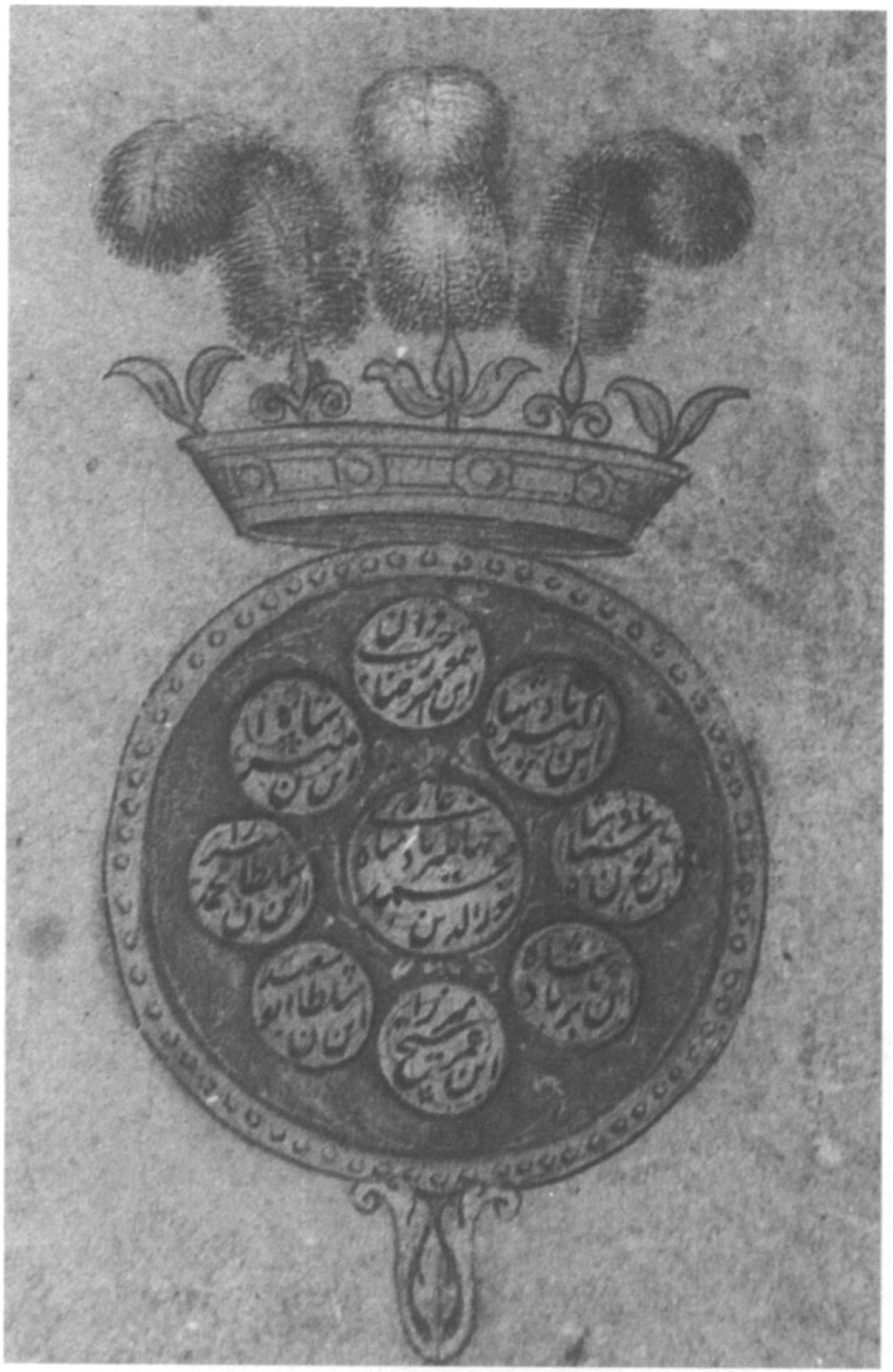
Seal of Jahangir

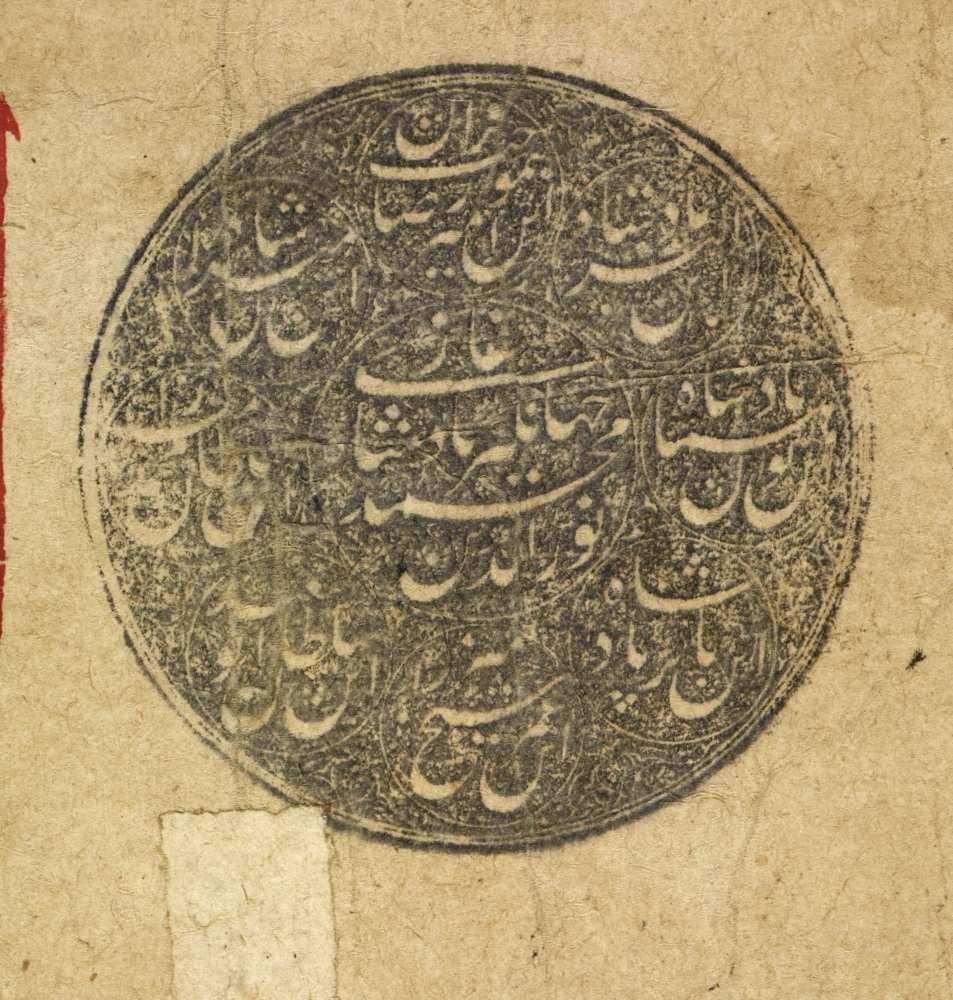
Seal of Jahangir

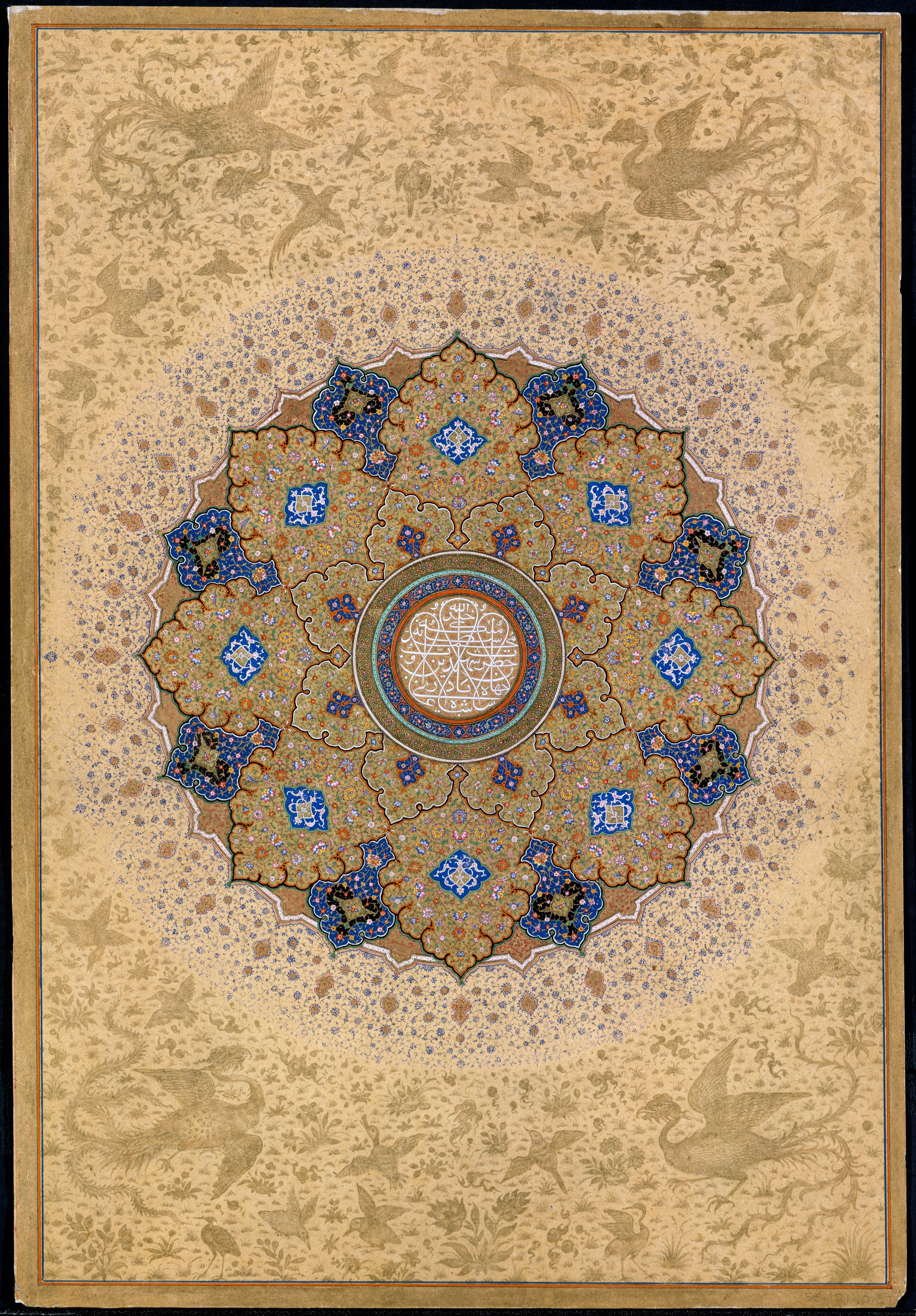
Seal of Shah Jahan

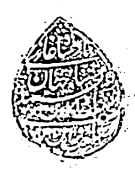
Seal of Shah Jahan

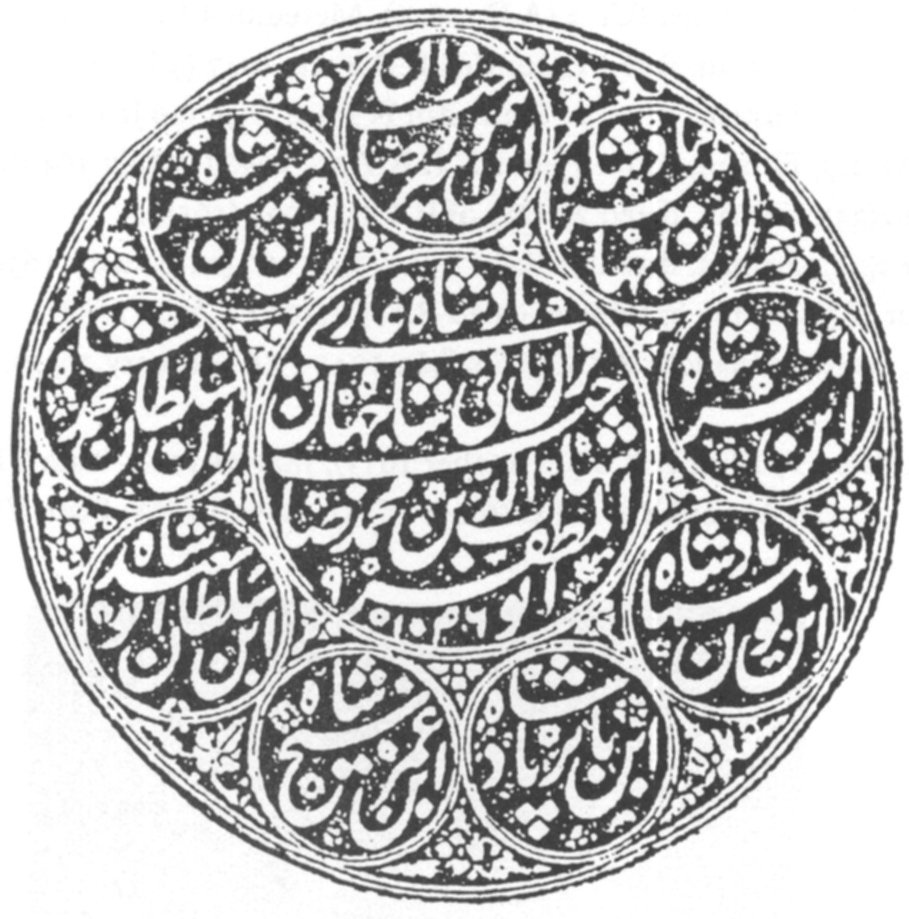
Seal of Shah Jahan

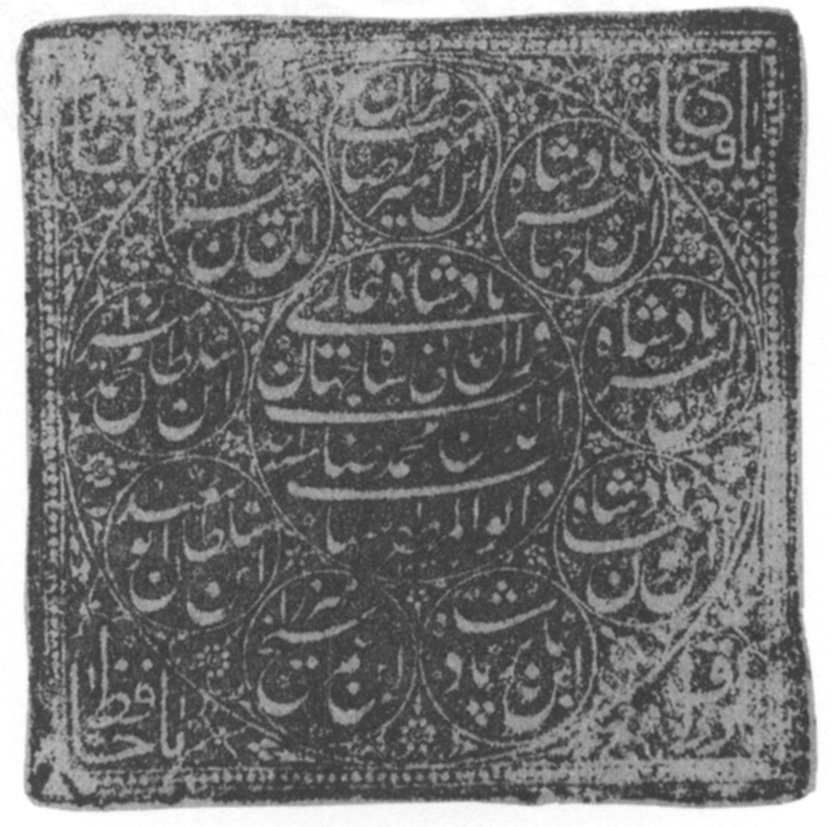
Seal of Shah Jahan

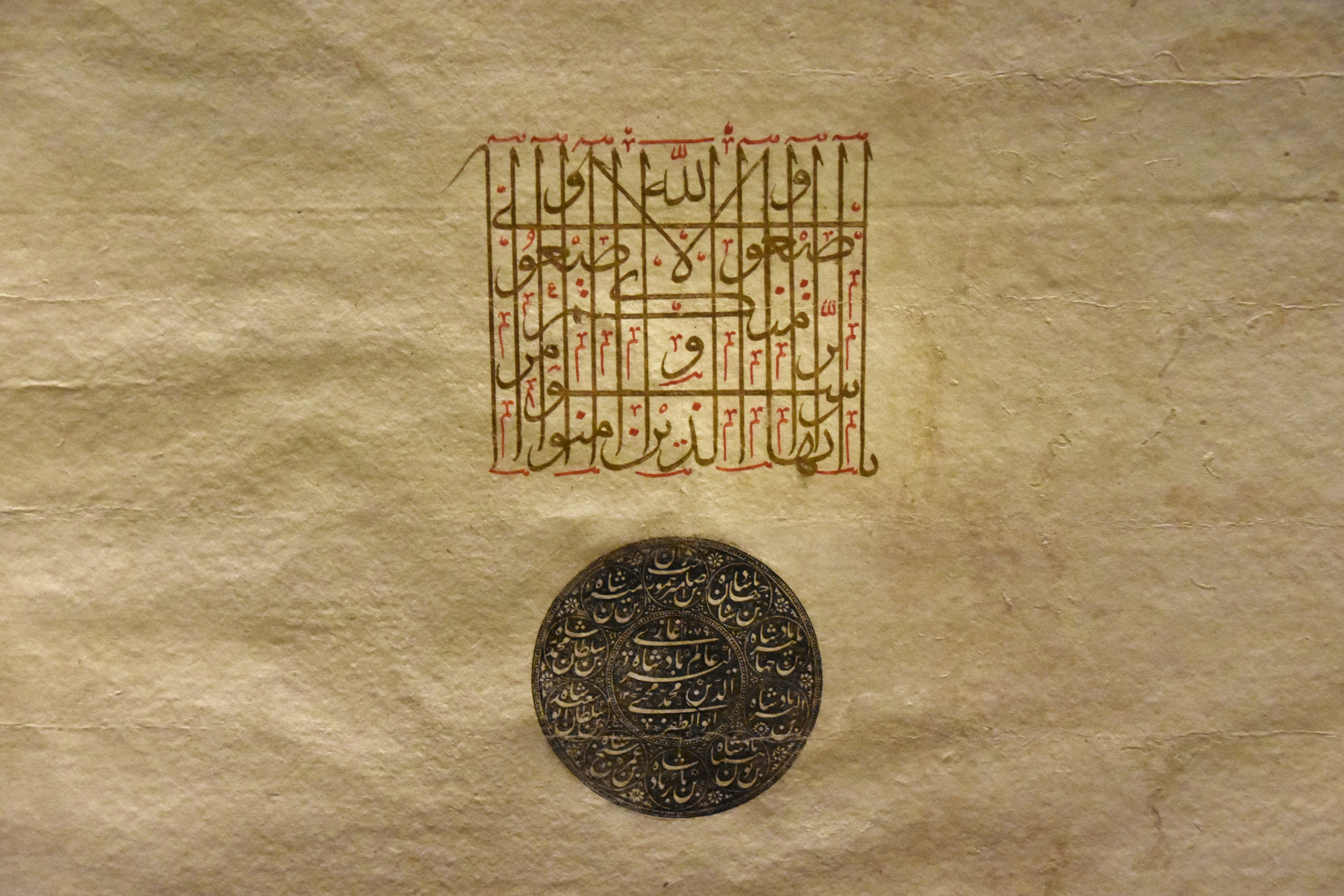
Seal of Aurangzeb

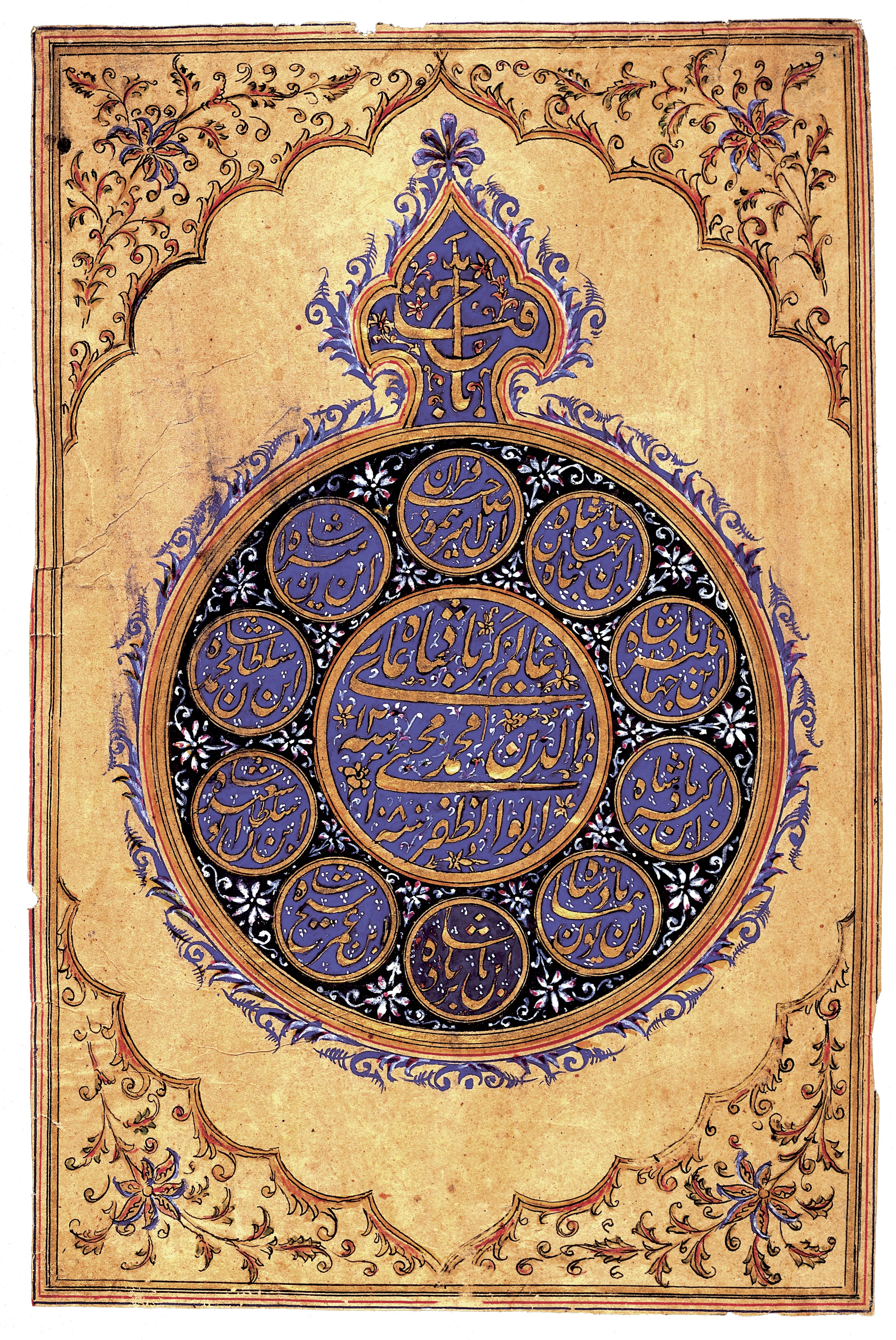
Seal of Aurangzeb

Seal of Aurangzeb

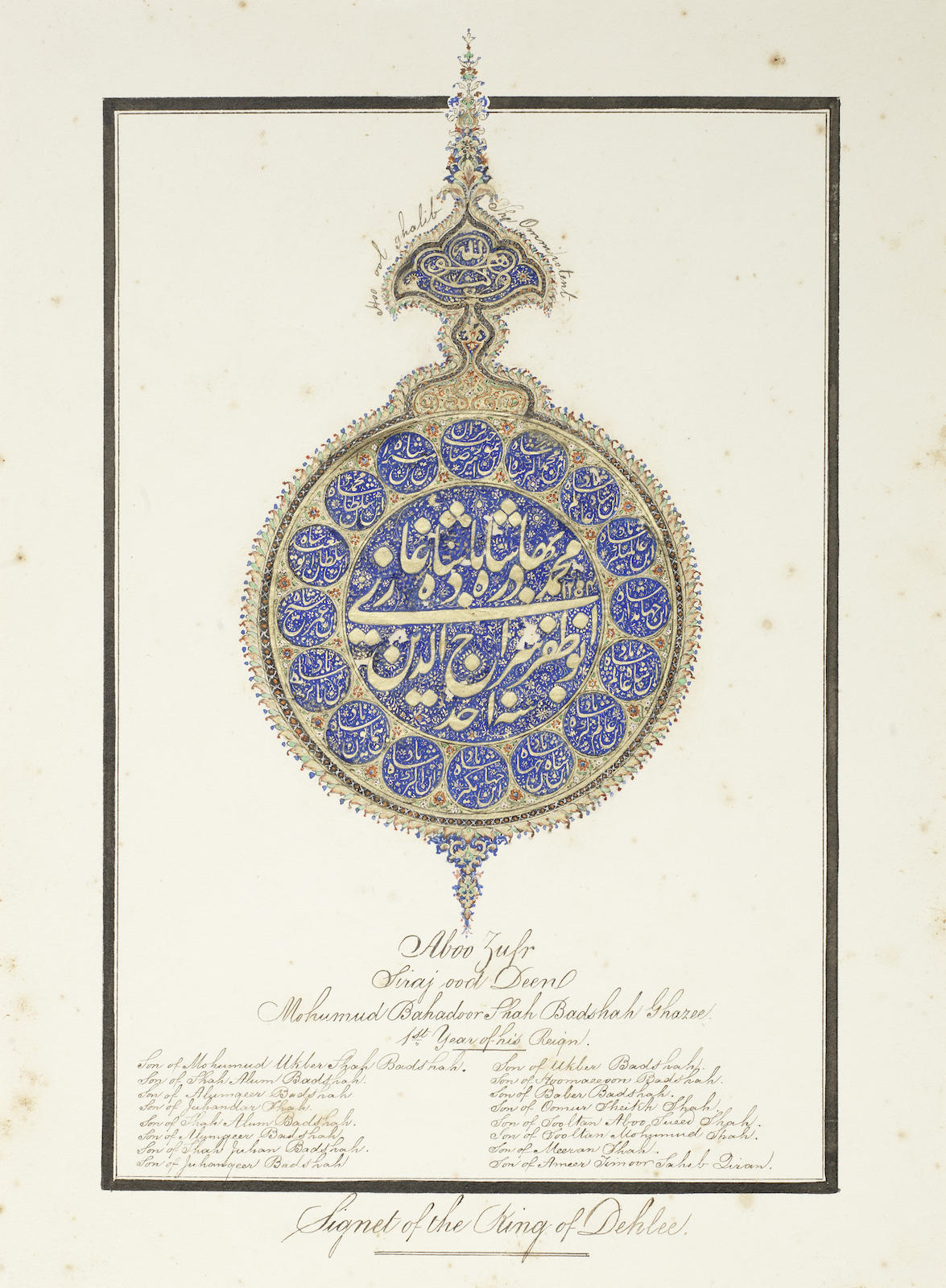
Seal of Bahadur Shah Zafar in the first year of his reign

== Flags of the subjects and vassals of the Mughal Empire ==
Nizam of Hyderabad

Bengal Subah (under Mughals 1576–1717)

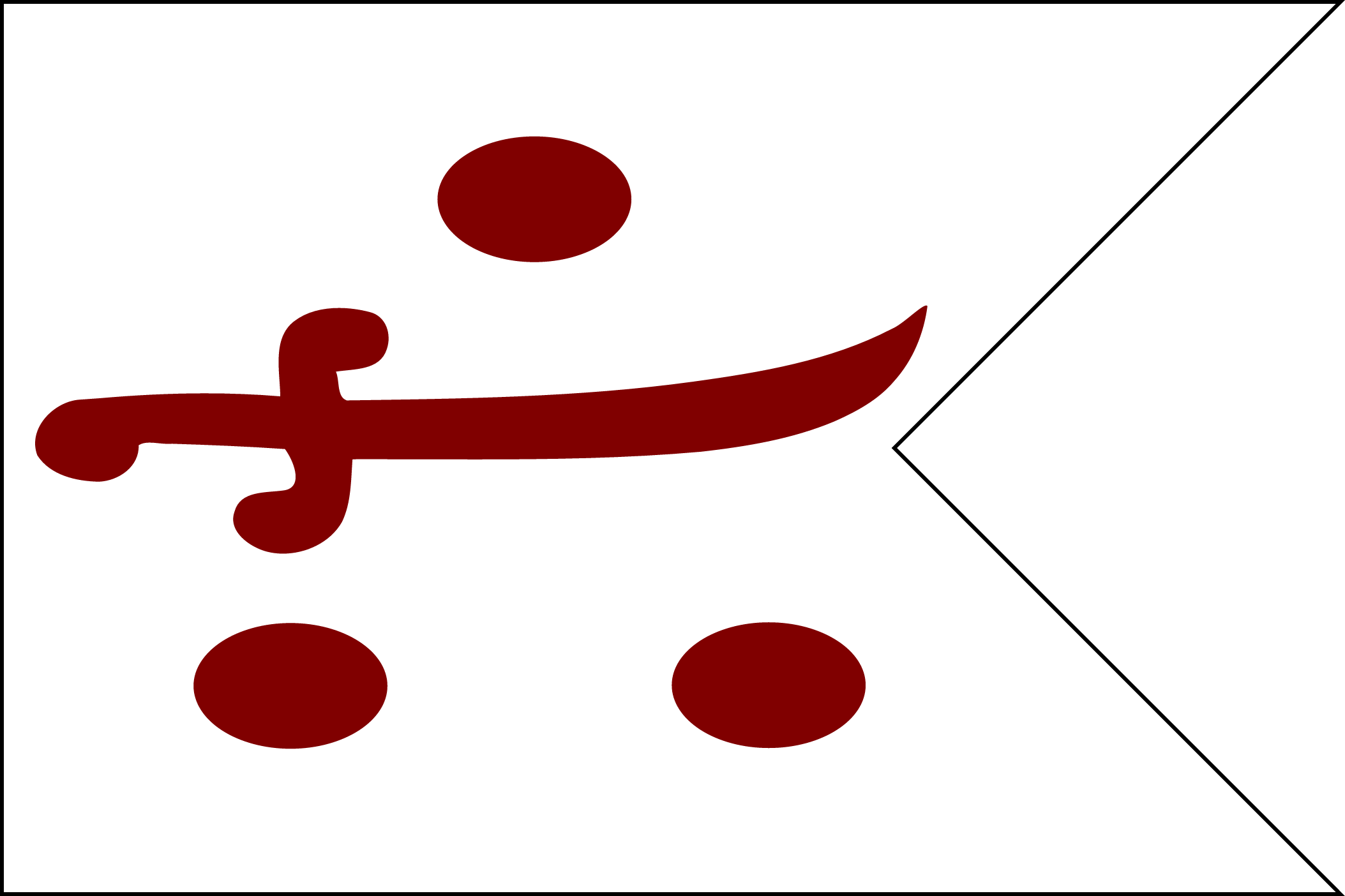
Nawab of Bengal (independently 1717–1757)

=== Historical depictions ===
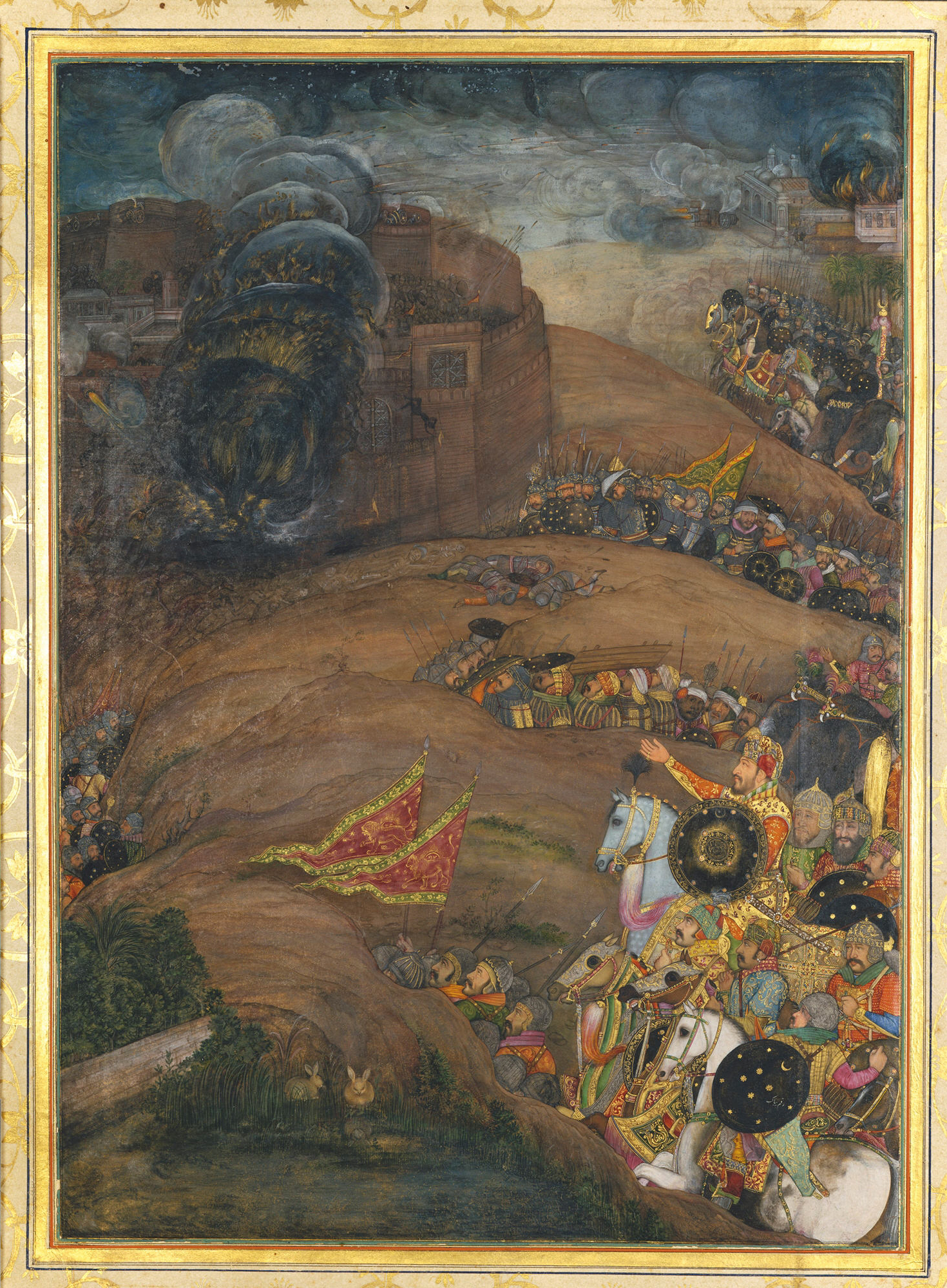
Illustrations from the 1636 Padshahnama of Shah Jahan showing Moghul Soldier & Civilian Costume. Notice the flag in the bottom of the pictures with the standing lion and the sun in a red interior color, this is a scene from the Siege of Kandahar of 1631 during Shah-Jahan's time. Notice the flag in the upper part of the picture with green interior and yellow linings.

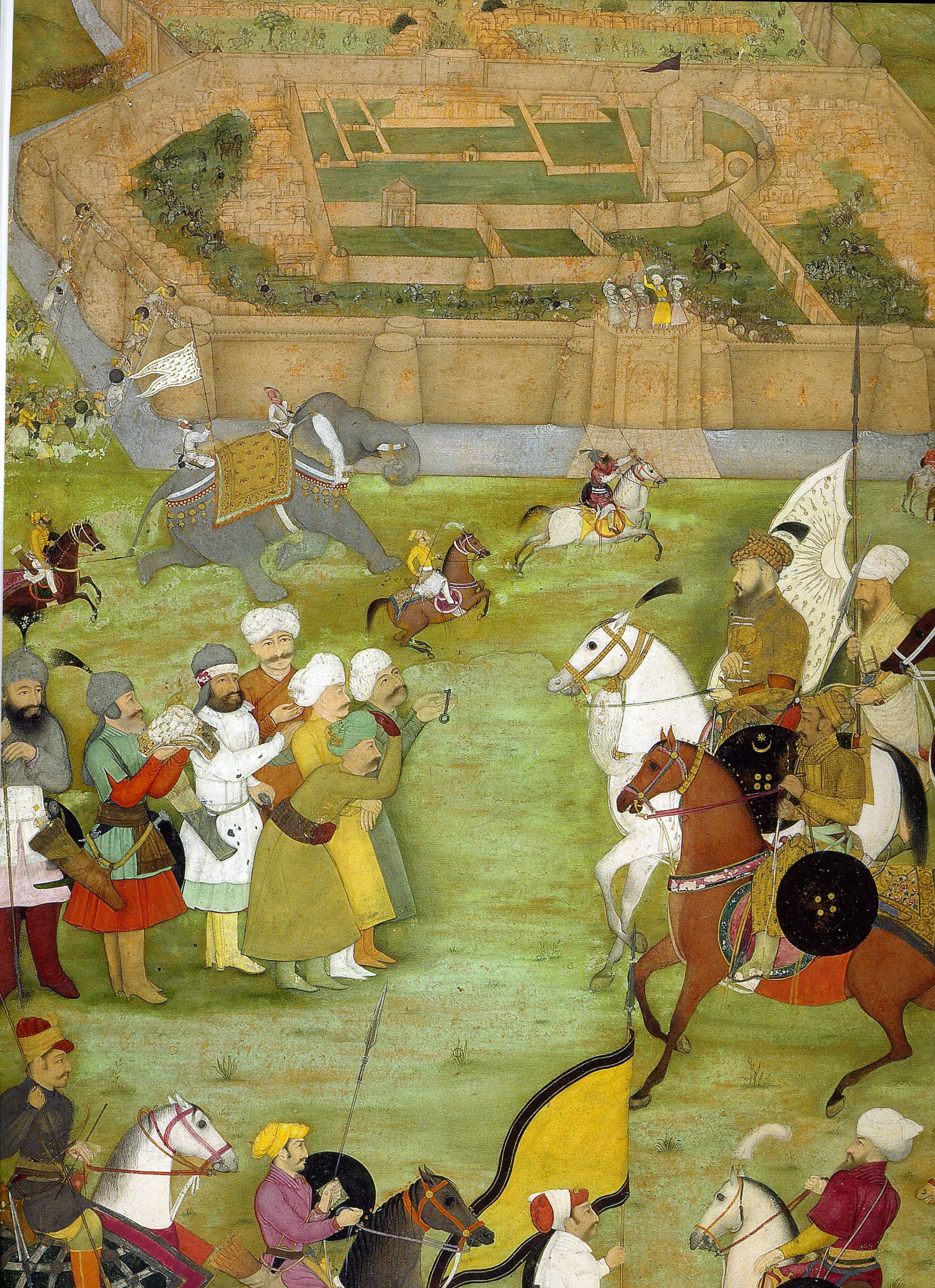
A Mughal miniature from the Padshahnama depicting the surrender of the Safavid Persian garrison of Kandahar in 1638 to the Mughal army of Shah Jahan commanded by Kilij Khan. Notice the white flag with the rising Sun. Perhaps a flag signalling peace. As Safavid forces give the city without bloodshed.

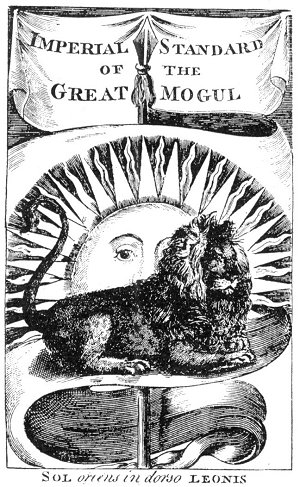
An engraving from Edward Terry's A Voyage to East-India (1655) titled Imperial Standard of the Great Mogul (featuring the Nad-e-Ali represented by the lion, and the sun known as Aftab).

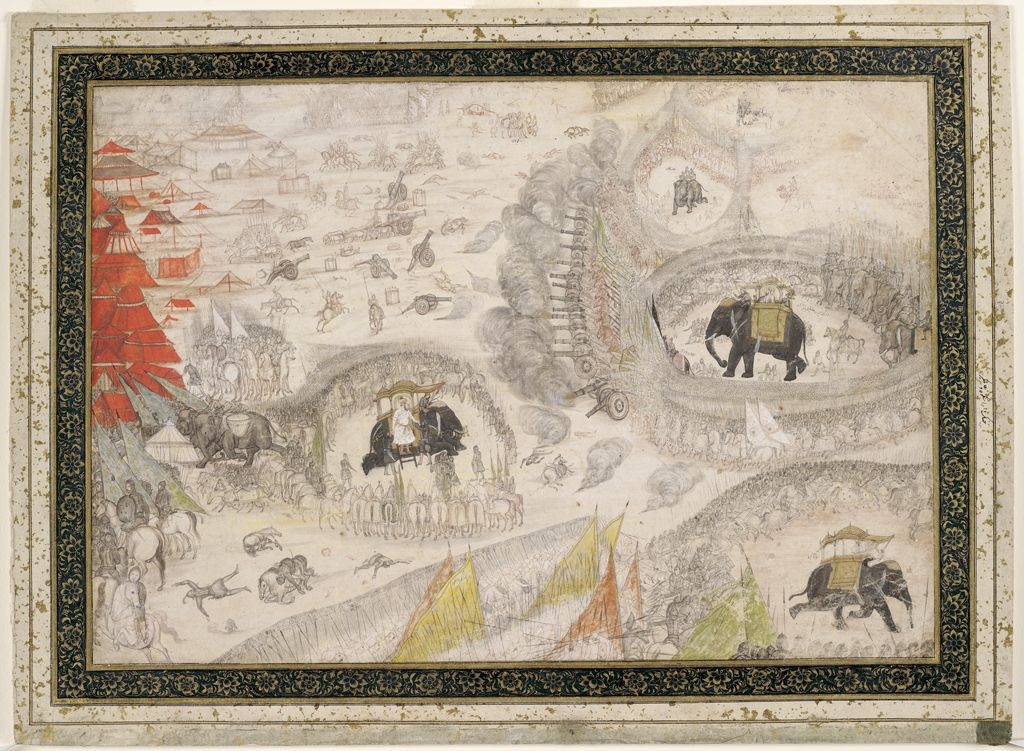
A mid-17th century painting of the Battle of Samugarh between the three sons of Shah Jahan

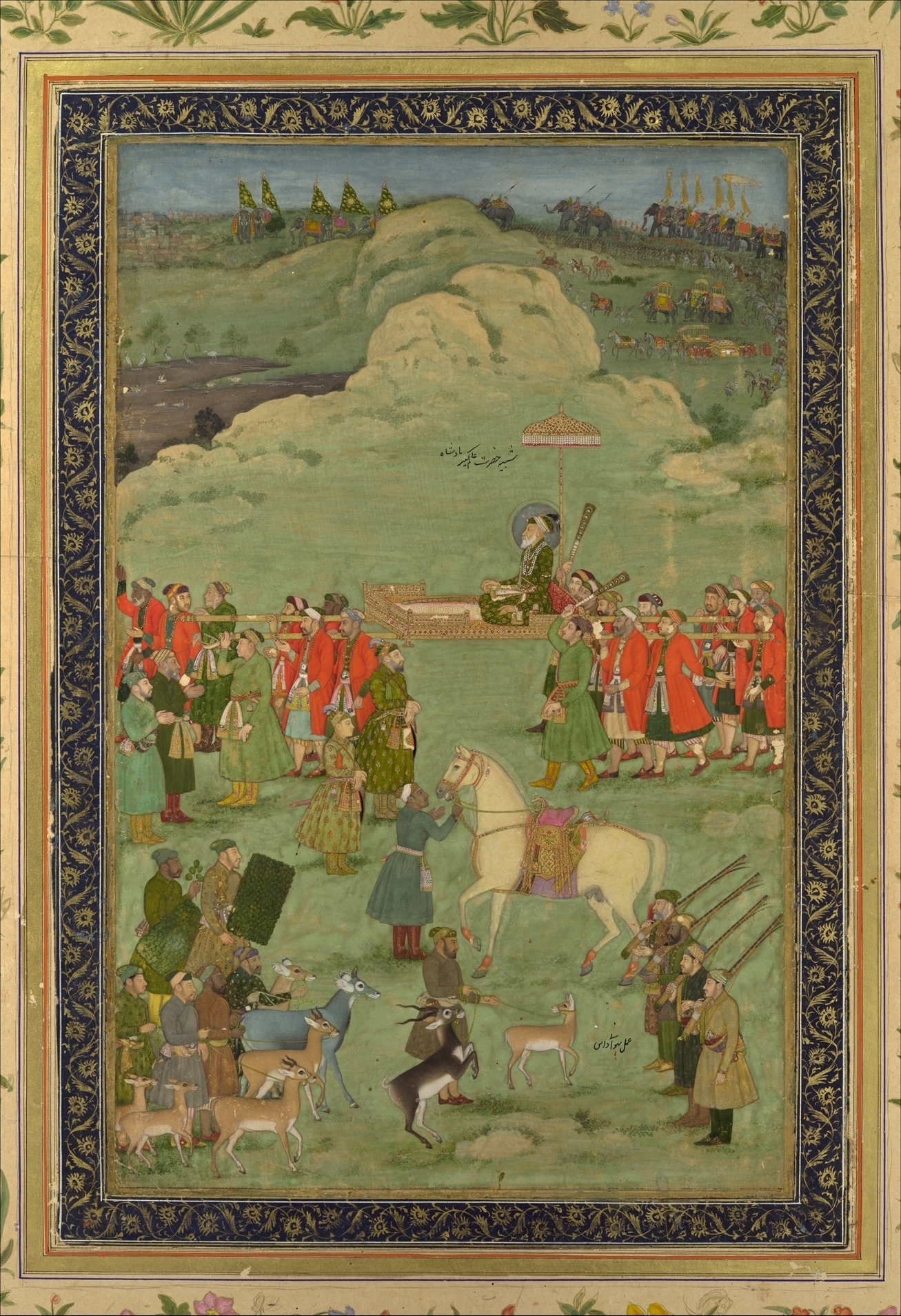
Aurangzeb leads his final expedition (1705), leading an army of 500,000 troops (note flags in the background).

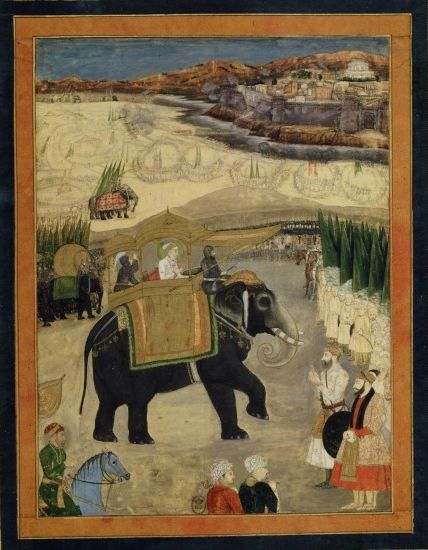
Aurangzeb commanding his army (note triangular green flags)

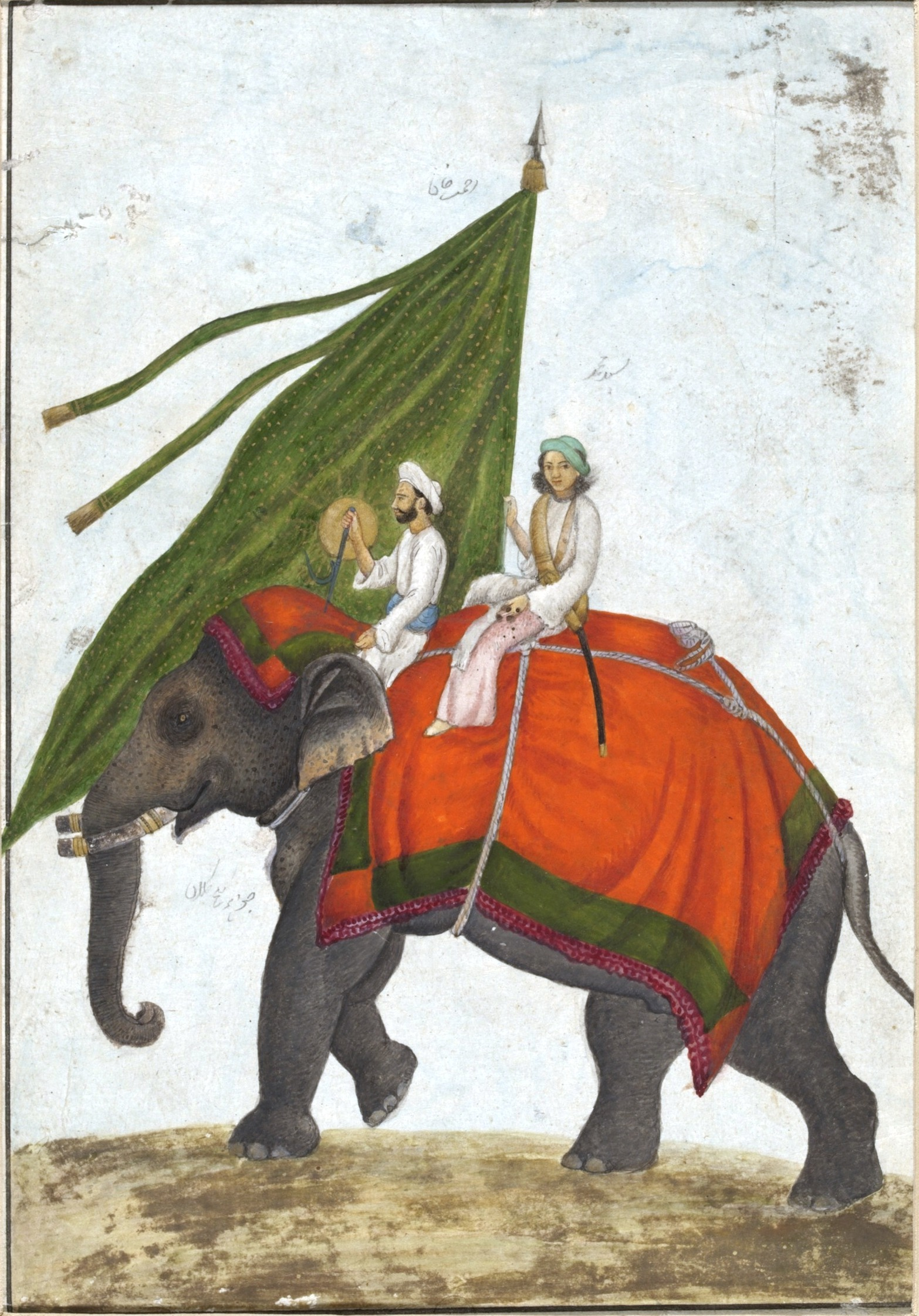
An elephant with a mahout and a standard-bearer carrying a green standard with a gold sun. One of a set.

Funeral of Asaf-ud-Daulah in the year 1797 under a canopy inside the Bara Imambara; (note:Flag (green) of the Mughal Empire raised higher than the Awadh flag)

== See also ==
- Mughal Empire
- Peacock Throne
- List of Pakistani flags
- List of Indian flags
