= Flag of Pakistan =

Islamic Republic of Pakistan
- پرچمِ ستارہ و ہلال ('Flag of the Star and Crescent')
- Use: National flag
- Proportion: 2:3
- Adopted: 11 August 1947; 79 years ago
- Design: A white star and crescent on a dark green field, with a vertical white stripe at the hoist
- Designed by: Syed Amir-uddin Kedwaii
- Use: Civil ensign
- Proportion: 2:3
- Design: A red field with the national flag in the canton.
- Use: Naval ensign
- Proportion: 1:2
- Design: A lengthened version of the national flag.
- Use: Civil flag
- Proportion: 2:3
- Design: Azure field charged with dark blue bar fimbriated with white, national flag in canton.

The national flag of Pakistan, often referred to as the Flag of the Star and Crescent (Parcham-e-Sitāra-o-Hilāl; پرچمِ ستارہ و ہلال), is made up of a green field with a stylized tilted white descending crescent moon and five-pointed star at its centre, and a vertical white stripe at its hoist-end. The flag has become the predominant and most recognizable symbol of Pakistan. Though the specific shade of green on the flag is mandated only as 'dark green', its official and most consistent representation is in Pakistan green, which is shaded distinctively darker and is represented by the Pantone color 19-5917 TCX. It was adopted by the Constituent Assembly of Pakistan on 11 August 1947, and it became the official flag of the Dominion of Pakistan on 14 August 1947, following independence from the British Empire. The flag was subsequently retained as that of the Islamic Republic of Pakistan in 1956 and remains in use as the national flag to this day.

Most notably, the flag is referred to in the third verse of Pakistan's national anthem, and is widely flown on several important days of the year, including Republic Day, Independence Day and Defence Day. It is also hoisted every morning at schools, offices and government buildings to the playing of the national anthem and lowered again before sunset. The Government of Pakistan has formalized rules and regulations related to the flying of the national flag; it is to be displayed all day at full-mast on 23 March annually to commemorate the adoption of the Lahore Resolution in 1940 and the declaration of Pakistan as an independent Islamic republic with a constitution in 1956, both of which occurred on the same day. The same regulations also apply on 14 August annually, in celebration of Pakistan's day of independence; when the country was carved out from erstwhile British Raj as the homeland and nation-state for the Muslims of the Indian subcontinent.

== History ==
Pakistan National Movement's c.1942 proposed flag for Pakistan, as depicted on the cover of Choudhry Rahmat Ali's pamphlet "The Millat of Islam and the menace of 'Indianism'".

The Pakistan Flag is based on the original flag of the Muslim League, which itself drew inspiration from the flag of the Ottoman Empire. The star and crescent design appears on Ottoman flags beginning in the late 18th or early 19th century.

In 1942, the Pakistan National Movement published a pamphlet, "The Millat of Islam and the menace of 'Indianism'", by the founder of the Pakistan Movement, Choudhry Rahmat Ali, depicting on its cover a flag of a proposed Pakistan with a thin white crescent and five white stars on a green field. A graphic illustration of Ali's flag in a critical work from 1946 more clearly portrays the stars in a pentagonal arrangement. Each star apparently represented a constituent nation of the proposed state: Punjab, Afghania (NWF), Kashmir, Sindh, and Balochistan. Ali also apparently designed a flag for an envisioned association of independent Muslim states distributed across South Asia, a 'Pak Commonwealth of Nations'. This flag featured a smaller crescent and ten stars.

The design eventually adopted as the Flag of Pakistan was based on the flag of the Muslim League. In 1937, the Muslim League began using a solid green banner charged with white descending crescent and star. In the early 1920s, during the era of the Khilafat Movement, Muslims had begun using a green banner with crescent and star, but as a religious rather than national symbol. By the 1930s, Muslims in India had become leery of the acceptance of the tricolor flag of the Congress Party as the national flag of India, in significant part because the discourses and rituals of hoisting the flag invoked explicitly Hindu religious themes. In 1940, Muhammad Ali Jinnah, leader of the Muslim League and future founder of the state of Pakistan, declared the League's flag the 'national flag of Muslim India'. By 1944, Muhammad Ali Jinnah was publicly declaring that they intended it to be the flag of Pakistan. This would become the flag of Pakistan, albeit charged with a white heraldic side or flank at the hoist. The resulting flag bears a striking resemblance to the various iterations of the Saudi flag from 1744 to 1937 which featured a white heraldic side or flank at the hoist and a green field charged with white calligraphic text (the Shahada).

In 1947, the Viceroy of India, Louis Mountbatten, proposed a national flag for the state of Pakistan which comprised the flag of the All-India Muslim League albeit with a Union Jack in the canton. This proposal was rejected by Muhammad Ali Jinnah on the grounds that a flag featuring both Saint George's Christian Cross alongside an Islamic star and crescent would not be accepted by the Pakistani people.

A team led by Syed Amir-uddin Kedwaii created the design that would ultimately be approved as the national flag. It was officially adopted by the Constituent Assembly of Pakistan on 11 August 1947, a few days before Pakistan gained its independence from British rule. Upon independence it became the flag of, first, the Dominion of Pakistan and then from 23 March 1956 that of the Islamic Republic of Pakistan. The design remains unchanged since its initial adoption.

== Timeline gallery ==
The star and crescent flag of the Ottoman Empire, a late 18th-century design officially adopted in 1844

Choudhry Rahmat Ali's proposed flag for a 'Pak Commonwealth of Nations'

Flag of the Muslim League

Flag of the Provisional Government of India (Kabul, 1915-1919)

Mountbatten's proposed flag for Pakistan

== Symbolism ==
The Islamic green of the flag represents the Muslim-majority populace of Pakistan while the white stripe on the hoist-end represents its various religious minorities i.e. Non-Muslims. The combined star and crescent serve as a symbol of Islam, with the crescent representing progress and the five-pointed star representing light and knowledge. The flag symbolizes Pakistan's commitment to both Islam as well as the rights of religious minorities.

== Construction ==
Construction sheet of the Pakistani flag

Specifications (technical specifications illustrated in the text on the side)

Construction sheet variant

The official design of the national flag was adopted by the Constituent Assembly together with a definition of the features and proportions.

According to the specifications, it is a dark green rectangular flag in the proportion of length [A] and width [B] as 3:2 with a white vertical bar at the mast, the green portion bearing a white crescent in the centre and a five-pointed white heraldic star. The width of the white portion [C] is one quarter the length of the flag [A], nearest the mast, so the green portion occupies the remaining three quarters [D]. Draw a diagonal L3 from the top right-hand corner to the bottom left corner of the green portion. On this diagonal establish two points P1 and P2. P1 is positioned at the centre of the green portion and P2 at the intersection of the diagonal L3 and an arc C4 created from the top right-hand corner equal to 13/20 the height of the flag [E]. With the centre at point P1 and a radius 3/10 the height of the flag describe the first circle C1 and with the centre at point P2 and a radius 11/40 the height of the flag describe a second circle C2. The enclosures made by these two circles form the crescent. The dimensions of the five-pointed white heraldic star are determined by drawing a circle C3 with a radius 1/10 the height of the flag positioned between P2 and P3 on the diagonal L3. The circle surrounds the five points of the heraldic star and the star lies with one point on the diagonal L3 at point P3 where circle C1 intersects the diagonal L3. The flag is coloured in Pakistan green having standard RGB values (red = 0, green = 64, blue = 26) or with hex triplet #00401A or the HSV value = (h = 144, s = 100, v = 25). The left strip, the star and the crescent are painted in white. The flag is supported from left white side.

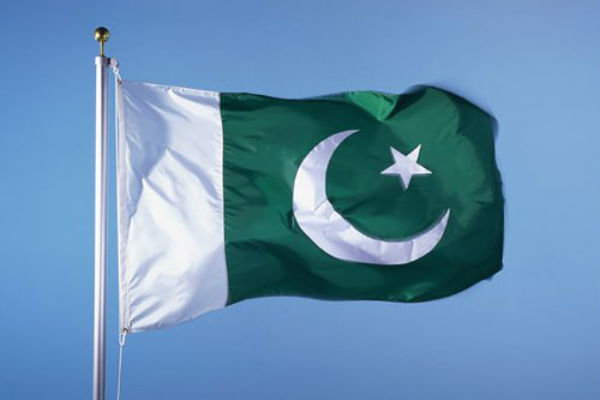
Pakistani flag

=== Dimensions ===
The Interior Ministry of Pakistan provides dimensions for flags in different circumstances:

- For ceremonial occasions: 7.3 by 4.9 metres (24 by 16 ft), 6.4 by 4.3 metres (21 by 14 ft), 5.5 by 3.7 metres (18 by 12 ft).
- For use over buildings: 1.8 by 1.2 metres (6 by 4 ft) or 0.91 by 0.61 metres (3 by 2 ft).
- For cars: 609.6 by 406.4 millimetres (24 in × 16 in)
- For tables: 260.35 by 209.55 millimetres (10 1/4 in × 8 1/4 in)

== Legal basis ==
- No other flag must fly higher (except the United Nations Flag at United Nations buildings).
- When displayed or flown alongside other national flags, the National Flag must be displayed or flown at the same height as the other national flags, never lower.
- When displayed alongside provincial, military or corporate flags, the National Flag must be higher.
- When tied to a mast, it must be tied only at the left (at the beginning of the white bar) and left to fly freely without any obstruction.
- Must not touch the ground, shoes or feet or anything unclean.
- Must never be flown in darkness.
- Must be raised at dawn and lowered at dusk (except on the Parliament of Pakistan, which is the only official building on which the flag is never lowered). When flown over the Parliament of Pakistan at night, it must always remain alit with artificial light
- Must not be marked with anything (including words or pictures).
- When raising: (i) must be saluted to by all uniformed personnel, (ii) others must stand in attention.
- Must be raised or lowered ceremoniously.
- Must never be displayed vertically.
- When displayed horizontally, the white strip must always be at the left, with green field on the right.
- Must not fly or be displayed upside down or with the crescent and star facing left.
- Must not be displayed anywhere where it is likely to get dirty.
- Must not be set on fire or trampled upon.
- Must not be buried or lowered into a grave (when burying a flag-bearing casket, the National Flag must be detached from the casket and held above the grave as the casket is lowered or removed from the casket before burial).

== Days of display ==
Date	Position	Reason
23 March	Full-mast	Pakistan Day: Adoption of the Lahore Resolution (1940) and declaration of the Islamic Republic (1956)
21 April	Half-mast	Death Anniversary of the National Poet, Muhammad Iqbal (1938)
14 August	Full-mast	Independence Day (1947)
11 September	Half-mast	Death Anniversary of the Father of the Nation, Muhammad Ali Jinnah (1948)
9 November	Full-mast	Birthday of Muhammad Iqbal
25 December	Full-mast	Birthday of Muhammad Ali Jinnah

== Display and use ==
The flag is always displayed prominently in state institutions from schools to ministries. The Parliament, ministries, schools, military, councils, governors buildings, offices, bridges, airports, and every state owned building in the country features one or more flags of Pakistan.The use of the national flag is regulated by the Pakistan Flag Rules, which were introduced in 2002 by Prime Minister Zafarullah Khan Jamali. The national flag is flown on the official residences and vehicles (cars, boats, planes) of the following public officials:

Office	Buildings	Vehicles
The President of Pakistan	check	check
The Prime Minister of Pakistan	check	check
The Chairman of the Senate	check	check
The Speaker of the National Assembly	check	check
The Chief Justice of Pakistan	check	check
The Chief Justice of the Federal Shariat Court	check	check
The Governors of the Provinces	check	check
Federal Ministers (and officials entitled to the privileges of Federal Ministers)	check	check
The Chief Ministers of the Provinces	check	check
The Ministers of the Provinces	check	check
The Chief Election Commissioner	check	check
The Deputy Chairman of the Senate	check	
The Deputy Speaker of the National Assembly	check	
The Speakers of the Provincial Assemblies	check	
The Justices of the High Courts	check	check
Ambassadors and High Commissioners of Pakistan	check	check
Commissioners of Divisions, Deputy Commissioners and Political Agents	check	

== Promoting the flag ==
- 2019 – The largest balloon mosaic (flag) is 180.172 m^{2} (1939 ft^{2} 37 in^{2}) achieved by Pakistan Hindu Council (Pakistan) in Islamabad, Pakistan, on 5 August 2019. It is a Guinness World Record.
- 2017 – On 14 August, People of Balochistan hoisted a 3.2-kilometre (2 mi)-long flag of Pakistan in Quetta.
- 2014 – On 15 February, 29,040 people gathered in a stadium in Lahore to form the flag of Pakistan and set a new world record for forming the world's largest national flag comprising humans, which was certified by Guinness World Records.
- 2012 – On 22 October, 24,200 people gathered in a stadium in Lahore to form the flag of Pakistan and set a new world record for forming the world's largest national flag comprising humans, which was certified by Guinness World Records.
- 2004 – In August, a 103.6 m × 155.4 m, 16,110 m^{2} (173,400 sq ft) flag of Pakistan was unfurled at the National Stadium Karachi, setting the world record for the largest flag.
- 1947 – On the night of 14 August 1947, a group of Boy Scouts were in France when the news reached them that their country had become independent. Mohammad Iqbal Qureshi was one of the Muslim boy scouts who with the help of his friends turned a green turban into a Pakistani flag and unfurled it. 15 August 1947 was the first time when the Pakistani flag flew on foreign soil.

== See also ==
- Syed Amir-uddin Kedwaii
- Master Afzal Hussain
- Choudhry Rahmat Ali
- State emblem of Pakistan
- Presidential Standard of Pakistan
- Star and crescent
- List of Pakistani flags
- National Anthem of Pakistan
- Flag of Turkey
