= List of Urdu poets =

Urdu_example

The following is a list of Urdu-language poets.

== 13th century ==
Poet	Image	Pen Name	Era	Work
Amir Khusro			(1253–1325)	Tuhfat-us-Sigh
Bande Nawaz			(1321–1442)	
Kabir			(15th century)	

== 15th century ==
Poet	Image	Pen Name	Era	Work
Meera		Mira Bai	1498	

== 16th century ==
Poet	Image	Pen Name	Era	Work
Ibrahim Quli Qutb Shah Wali			1518 – 5 June 1580	
Abdul Rahim Khan-I-Khana			(1556 – 1627)	Wrote poetry primarily in Persian, but also in Hindavi
Ali Adil Shah I			1558–1579	
Muhammad Quli Qutb Shah			(1565–1611)	Kulliyat-e-Quli Qutub Shah wrote poetry primarily in Persian, but also in Hindavi
Ibrahim Adil Shah II			1571 – 12 September 1627	
Chandar Bhan Brahman			unknown – 1662	Brahman was appointed as court chronicler and he was give responsibility for maintaining Shah Jahan's personal diary. He wrote a memoir Chahar Chaman

== 17th century ==
Poet	Image	Pen Name	Era	Work
Nusrati			(died 1674)	
Mirza Abdul Qadir Bedil Dehlavi		Bedil	(1642-1720)	
Wali Muhammad Wali		Wali Deccani	(1667–1707)	
Shah Mubarak Abroo			(1683–1733)	
Siraj-ud-Din Ali Khan Arzu		Arzu	(1687–1756)	Mehr-o-Mah, Guka-ri-Kayal
Mirza Mazhar Jan-e-Janaan		Jan-e-Janaan	(1699–1781)	Majmua-Urdu-Ashaar

== 18th century ==
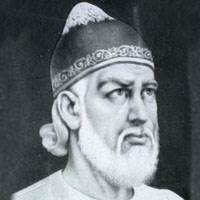
Ghulam Hamdani Mushafi, the poet first believed to have coined the name "Urdu" around 1780 AD for a language that went by a multiplicity of names before his time.

- Mirza Muhammad Rafi, Sauda (1713–1780)
- Siraj Aurangabadi, Siraj (1715–1763)
- Mohammad Meer Soz Dehlvi, Soz (1720-1799)
- Khwaja Mir Dard, Dard (1721–1785)
- Qayem Chandpuri, Muhammad Qyamuddin Ali Qayem (1722–1793)
- Mir Taqi Mir, Mir (1723–1810)
- Fidvi Lahori, Fidvi (1729–1780)
- Nazeer Akbarabadi, Nazeer (1740–1830)
- Qalandar Bakhsh Jurat, Jurat (1748–1810)
- Mashafi Shaikh Ghulam Hamdani, Mas'hafi (1750–1824)
- Insha Allah Khan 'Insha', Insha (1756–1817)
- Khwaja Haidar Ali Aatish, Atish (1764 –1846)
- Mah Laqa Bai (1768 – 1824)
- Saadat Yaar Khan Rangin, Rangin (1757–1835)
- Bahadur Shah, Zafar (1775–1862)
- Imam Baksh Nasikh, Nasikh (1776–1838)
- Muhammad Ibrahim Khan, Zauq (1789–1854)
- Mirza Asadullah Khan Ghalib, Ghalib (1797–1869)
- Fazl-e-Haq Khairabadi (1797–1861)
- Chhannu Lal Dilgeer, Ghulam Hussain (1780–1848)

== 19th century ==
- Momin Khan Momin, Momin (1801–1852)
- Mirza Salaamat Ali Dabeer (Mirza Salaamat Ali), Dabeer (1803–1875)
- Mir Babar Ali Anis, Anis (1803–1874)
- Daya Shankar Kaul Nasim (1811–1845)
- Agha Hasan Amanat Amanat (1815 – 1858)
- Amir Meenai, Amir (1828–1900)
- Muhammad Husain Azad (1830 – 1910)
- Dagh Dehlvi (Nawab Mirza Khan), Daagh (1831–1905)
- Aasi Ghazipuri (1834 – 1917)
- Altaf Hussain Hali (Hali Panipati), Hali (1837–1914)
- Akbar Allahabadi (Syed Akbar Hussain), Akbar (1846–1921)
- Shad Azimabadi (1846 – 1927)
- Fuzail Ahmad Nasiri (1849– 1933)
- Imdad Imam Asar (1849– 1933)
- Ahmed Raza Khan Barelvi (Maulana Ahmed Raza Khan Barelvi), Raza (1856–1921)
- Hassan Raza Khan Barelvi (Maulana Hassan Raza Khan Barelvi), Hassan (1859-1908)
- Bekhud Badayuni (Muhammad Abdul-Hayy Siddiqui), Bekhud (1857–1912)
- Shibli Nomani (Allama Shibli Nomani). Shibli (1857–1914)
- Abdul Ghafoor Shahbaz (1857–1908)
- Muztar Khairabadi (1862–1927)
- Alam (1868–1937)
- Zaigham (d. 1869)
- Saqib Lakhnavi (1869–1946)
- Tashna (1872–1931)
- Zafar Ali Khan (1873–1956)
- Arzoo Lakhnavi (1873–1951)
- Syed Ghulam Bhik Nairang (1875–1952)
- Hasrat Mohani (Syed Fazlul Hussain), Hasrat (1875–1951)
- Dil Shahjahanpuri (Zameer Hasan Khan), Dil (1875–1959)
- Khwaja Muhammad Afzal (1875–1940)
- Allama Muhammad Iqbal (Allama Iqbal), Iqbal (1877–1938)
- Mohammad Ali Jauhar (Maulana Jauhar), Jauhar (1878-1931)
- Fani Badayuni (Shaukat Ali Khan), Fani (1879–1941)
- Seemab Akbarabadi (Ashiq Hussain) (1882–1951)
- Brij Narayan Chakbast (1882–1926)
- Bekhud Dehlvi (Syed Wahiduddin Ahmed) (1882–1955)
- Niaz Fatehpuri (Maulana Niyaz Muhammad Khan) (1882–1966)
- Yagana Changezi (Mirza Wajid Hussain Yaas) Yaas (1883–1956)
- Josh Malsiyani (Labhu Ram) Josh (1883–1976)
- Asghar Gondvi (Asghar Hussain Asghar), Asghar (1884-1936)
- Asar Lakhnavi Asar (1885–1967)
- Abdur Rahman Bijnori (1885 – 1918)
- Natiq Gulaothi (1886 – 1969)
- Tilok Chand Mehroom (1887–1966)
- Qamar Jalalvi (1887–1968)
- Amjad Hyderabadi (Amjad Hussain), Amjad (1888-1961)
- Jigar Moradabadi (Ali Sikandar), Jigar (1890–1960)
- Raaz Chandpuri (Mohd. Sadiq) (1892–1969)
- Zamin Ali, Zamin (1893–1955)
- Najm Afandi (1893–1975)
- Hakim Ahmad Shuja (1893–1969)
- Josh Malihabadi (Shabbir Hassan Khan), Josh (1894–1982)
- Muhammad Mustafa Jauhar, Jauhar (1895– 1985)
- Hamid Ullah Afsar (1895 – 1974)
- Firaq Gorakhpuri (Raghupati Sahay), Firaq (1896–1982)
- Ram Prasad Bismil (1897–1927)
- Abr Ahasani Gunnauri (Ahmed Baksh) Abr (1897–1973)
- Munavvar Lakhnavi Bisheshwar Prasad Munavvar (1897–1970)
- Ahmaq Phaphoondvi (1895-1957)
- Josh Malihabadi (1898 – 1982)
- Ghulam Mustafa Tabassum (1899 – 1978)

== 1900 ==
- Maghfoor Ahmad Ajazi (1900–1966)
- Hafeez Jalandhari (Mohd.Hafeez), Hafeez (1900–1982)
- Talib Chakwali Manohar Lal Kapur ‘Talib’ (1900–1988)
- Pandit Harichand Akhtar ('Akhtar') (1901–1958)
- Alam Muzaffarnagari (Muhammad Ishaaq) (1901–1969)
- Bismil Saeedi (1901–1977)
- Bismil Azimabadi (1901–1978)
- Khushtar Girami (Dewan Ram Rakhamal Kalia) (1902–1988)
- Anand Narain Mulla (1901–1997)
- Muhammad Din Taseer (1902 – 1950)
- Zaheen Shah Taji (1902–1978)
- Syed Sajjad Zaheer (1904–1973)
- Zulfiqar Ali Bukhari (1904–1975)
- Chiragh Hasan Hasrat (1904 – 1955)
- Majnun Gorakhpuri (1904 – 1988)
- Akhtar Sheerani (Mohd.Dawood Khan) (1905–1948)
- Saghar Nizami (1905–1984)
- Syed Barkatullah Barkat (1905 – 1979)
- Baqi Siddiqui (1905 – 1972)
- Abid Ali Abid (1906–1971)
- Gopal Mittal (1906–1993)
- Mahir ul Qadri (1906–1978)
- Ratan Pandoravi (Rala Ram), Ratan (1907–1998)
- Makhdum Muhiuddin (1908–1969)
- Arsh Malsiani (Bal Mukund) (1908–1979)
- Noor-us-Sabah (1908–1978)
- Manju Qamaraidullāhī (1908–1983)
- Agha Jani Kashmiri (1908–1998)
- Majaz (Asrar-ul-Haq), Majaz (1909–1955)
- Abdul Hamid Adam (1909–1981)
- Kunwar Mohinder Singh Bedi Sahar (1909 – 1992)
- Sayyid Ahmedullah Qadri, Lisan ul Mulk(1909–1985)
- Kunwar Mohinder Singh Bedi Sahar, Sahar (1909-1998)

== 1910 ==
- Abdul Hameed Adam (1910–1981)
- Noon Meem Rashid (1910–1975)
- Hafizur Rahman Wasif Dehlavi (1910 – 1987)
- Talib Dehlavi (1910 – 1975)
- Faiz Ahmed Faiz, Faiz (1911–1984)
- Syed Faiz-ul Hassan Shah (1911–1984)
- Aijaz Siddiqi (1911–1978)
- Ravish Siddiqi (Ravish) (1911–1971)
- Nushoor Wahidi (1911–1981)
- Sohail Azimabadi (1911 – 1979)
- Ale Ahmad Suroor (1911-2002)
- Majaz Lakhnawi (1911 – 1955)
- Meeraji (1912–1949)
- Shifa Gwaliori (1912–1968)
- Moin Ahsan Jazbi (1912–2005)
- Shamim Karhani (1913–1975)
- Mehr Lal Soni Zia Fatehabadi (1913–1986)
- Dr. Rafiq Hussain (1913–1990)
- Sahir Hoshiarpuri (1913–1994)
- Ali Sardar Jafri (1913–2000)
- Raza Naqvi Wahi (1914–2002)
- Mir Gul Khan Nasir (1914–1983)
- Rais Amrohvi (1914–1988)
- Ehsan Danish (1914–1982)
- Jan Nisar Akhtar (1914–1976)
- Majeed Amjad (1914–1974)
- Sikandar Ali Wajd (1914–1983)
- Tanha Ansari (1914 – 1969)
- Qayyum Nazar (1914 – 1989)
- Raja Mehdi Ali Khan (1915 – 1966)
- Akhtar ul Iman (1915–1996)
- Alys Faiz (1915 – 2003)
- Ahmad Nadeem Qasmi, Nadeem (1916–2006)
- Zamir Jafri, Zamir (1916–1999)
- Shakeel Badayuni (1916–1970)
- Ahmad Nadeem Qasmi (1916 – 2006)
- Ali Jawad Zaidi (1916 – 2004)
- Agha Shorish Kashmiri (Agha Abdul Kareem) Shorish (1917–1975)
- Shan-ul-Haq Haqqee (1917–2005)
- Rishi Patialvi (Bam Dev Sharma) Rishi (1917–1999)
- Kaif Bhopali (1917 – 1991)
- Qamar Jalalabadi (1917 – 2003)
- Jagan Nath Azad (1918–2004)
- Kaifi Azmi (1918–2002)
- Fikr Taunsvi (1918-1987)
- Kamal Amrohi (1918-1993)
- Faruk Kaiser (1918-1987)
- Naeem Hashmi (1919–1976)
- Majrooh Sultanpuri (1919–2000)
- Khumar Barabankvi, Khumar (1919–1999)
- Qateel Shifai, Qateel (1919–2001)
- Masud Husain Khan (1919–2010)
- Mukhtar Siddiqui (1919–1972)

== 1920 ==
- S. H. Bihari(1920–1987)
- Kalim Ajiz (1920 – 2015)
- Lala Sehrai (1920 – 2000)
- Salaam Machhalishahari, Salaam (1921–1972)
- Sahir Ludhianvi, Sahir (1921–1980)
- Asad Bhopali (1921 – 1990)
- Krishan Mohan, Krishan Lal Krishan Mohan (1922–2004)
- Wazir Agha (1922–2010)
- Sulaiman Areeb (1922–1970)
- Sulaiman Khateeb (1922–1978)
- Hasrat Jaipuri (1922–1999)
- Mian Bashir Ahmed (1923 – 2021)
- Nusrat Zaidi (1923 – 2020)
- Munir Niazi (1923 – 2006)
- Ajmal Sultanpuri (1923 – 2020)
- Nazish Pratapgarhi, Nazish (1924–1981)
- Ada Jafri (1924–2015)
- Shaukat Pardesi (1924 – 1995)
- Nasir Kazmi, Nasir (1925–1972)
- Bekas Akbarabadi, M.G Gupta wrote Urdu anthology, Rahat-i-Ruh (2004),(1925–2011)
- Rahi Masoom Raza (1925–1992)
- Saqi Amrohvi (1925–2005)
- Himayat Ali Shair, Shair (1926–2019)
- Gulzar Dehlvi (1926 – 2020)
- Kanwal Ziai Hardayal Singh Datta (1927–2012)
- Naresh Kumar Shad (1927–1969)
- Khadija Mastoor (1927–1982)
- Ibn-e-Insha, Insha (1927–1978)
- Mohammad Alvi (1927 – 2018)
- Khaleel-Ur-Rehman Azmi (1927 – 1978)
- Bekal Utsahi (1928–2016)
- Sagar Siddiqui (1928–1974)
- Raja Mehdi Ali Khan (1928–1966)
- Habib Jalib (1928–1993)
- Dilawar Figar (1928–1998)
- Munir Niazi (1928–2006)
- Shabnam Romani, Shabnam (1928–2009)
- Mazhar Imam (1928–2012)
- Kaleem Usmani (1928–2000)
- Wasif Ali Wasif (1929–1993)
- Dilawar Figar (1929–1998)
- Talib Jauhari (1929–2020)
- Malikzada Manzoor Ahmad (1929 – 2016)
- Khamakha Hyderabadi (1929–2017)

== 1930 ==
- Mustafa Zaidi (1930–1970)
- Harbans Bhalla (1930–1993)
- Syed Amin Ashraf (1930–2013)
- Ahmad Faraz (1931–2008)
- Jaun Elia (1931–2003)
- Rajindar Nath Rehbar (1931–2022)
- Satyapal Anand (1931–2025)
- Aziz Qaisi (1931–1992)
- Sahir Lakhnavi (1931–2019)
- Ahmar Lari (1932–2011)
- Rajinder Manchanda Bani Bani (1932–1981)
- Mohsin Bhopali (1932–2007)
- Sardar Panchhi (1932)
- Abdur Rauf Urooj (c. 1932–1990)
- Saida Sherif (1932 – 2023)
- Zafar Iqbal (1932)
- Meena Kumari (1933 - 1972)
- Muzaffar Warsi (1933–2011)
- Syed Waheed Ashraf (1933)
- Aftab Iqbal Shamim (1933 – 2024)
- Waheed Akhtar (1934–1996)
- Sudarshan Faakir (1934–2008)
- Shakeb Jalali (1934 – 1966)
- Gulzar (1934)
- Mohsin Zaidi (1935–2003)
- Anwar Masood (1935)
- Bashar Nawaz (1935–2015)
- Bashir Badr (1935–2026)
- Zehra Nigah (1935)
- Shamsur Rahman Faruqi (1935 – 2020)
- Aftab Iqbal Shamim (1936–2024)
- Adil Mansuri (1936–2009)
- Akhlaq Mohammed Khan (Shahryar) (1936–2012)
- Baqar Naqvi (1936–2019)
- C. M. Naim (1936–2025)
- Shahzad A. Rizvi (1937)
- Unwan Chishti Iftikharul Hasan Unwan (1937–2004)
- Nida Fazli (1938–2016)
- Makhmoor Saeedi (1938–2010)
- Syed Mahmood Khundmiri (1938–2011)
- Zaitoon Bano (1938 – 2021)
- Rafiuddin Raz (1938)
- Sarfraz Shahid (1938 – 2021)
- Khawar Rizvi (1938 – 1981)
- Sultana Meher (1938)
- Obaidullah Aleem (1939–1997)
- Atta Shad (1939–1997)
- Nisar Nasik (1939–2019)
- Anis Nagi (1939–2019)

== 1940 ==
- Mahmood Shaam (1940)
- Kishwar Naheed (1940)
- Jazib Qureshi (1940)
- Muzaffar Ahmad Lari (1940)
- Wasim Barelvi (1940)
- Riaz Ahmed Gohar Shahi (1941)
- Pagal Adilabadi (1941 – 2007)
- Riaz ur Rehman Saghar (1941 – 2013)
- Ahfaz ur Rahman (1942)
- Shabnam Shakeel (1942 – 2013)
- Khalid Ahmad (1943)
- Iftikhar Arif (1943)
- Shamim Farooqui (1943–2014)
- Pirzada Qasim (1943)
- Amir Qazalbash (1943–2003)
- Hasan Kamal (1943)
- Amjad Islam Amjad (1944)
- Ghulam Muhammad Qasir, Qasir (1944–1999)
- Zameer Akhtar Naqvi (1944-2020)
- Javed Akhtar (1945)
- Sarmad Sehbai (1945)
- Naseer Turabi (1945 – 2021)
- Sheen Kaaf Nizam (1946)
- Anwer Zahidi (1946)
- Afzal Ahmed Syed (1946)
- Adeem Hashmi (1946 – 2001)
- Shamim Hashimi (1947)
- Saleem Kausar (1947)
- Mohsin Naqvi (1947-1996)
- Hakim Nasir (1947-2007)
- Anwar Jalalpuri (1947-2018)
- Syed Ali Akhtar Rizvi, Sha'oor(1948–2002)
- Muhammad Izhar ul Haq (1948)
- Fehmida Riaz (1948)
- Aslam Azad (1948-2022)
- Khaleel Mamoon (1948-2024)
- Pir Naseer-uddin-Naseer (1949–2009)
- Anwar Sagar (1949 – 2020)
- Sabir Zafar (1949)

== 1950 ==
- Rahat Indori (1950–2020)
- Zahid Abrol (1950)
- Neelam Bashir (1950)
- Abul Kalam Qasmi (1950 – 2021)
- Hilal Naqvi (1950)
- Jamal Ehsani (1951–1998)
- Rais Ansari (1951)
- Ashfaq Hussain (1951–)
- Ibrahim Ashk (1951 – 2022)
- Tabish Mehdi (1951 – 2025)
- Haider Qureshi (1952–)
- Yasmeen Hameed (1952)
- Taqi Abedi (1952)
- Parveen Shakir (1952–1994)
- Munawwar Rana (1952 – 2024)
- Fahmi Badayuni (1952 – 2024)
- Naseem uz Zafar Baquiri (1952)
- Khalid Iqbal Yasir (1952)
- Abdul Hamid (1953–)
- Shahida Hassan (1953)
- Popular Meeruthi (1953)
- Haider Qureshi (1953)
- Salma Shaheen (1954)
- Sara Shagufta (1954–1984)
- Moniza Alvi (1954)
- Ahmad Ali Barqi Azmi (1954 – 2022)
- Kazim Jarwali (1955–)
- Jameela Nishat (1955)
- Nawaz Deobandi (1956)
- Ishrat Afreen (1956)
- Sibt-e-Jaafar Zaidi (1957-2013)
- Bushra Farrukh (1957)
- Noon Meem Danish (1958–)
- Manzar Bhopali (1959)
- Rukhsana Noor (1959 – 2017)

== 1960 ==
- Fareed Parbati (1961)
- Samina Raja (1961)
- Anjum Rehbar (1962)
- Zahida Hina (1962–)
- Muhammad Fazal Azim Taha (1962–)
- Raees Warsi (1963)
- Khalil-ur-Rehman Qamar (1963)
- Najeeba Arif (1964)
- Zulfiqar Naqvi (1965)
- Faaiz Anwar (1965)
- Iqbal Ashhar (1966)
- Harris Khalique (1966)
- Ahmad Nesar (1967)
- Idris Azad (1969)
- Riaz Tasneem (1969)

== 1970 ==
- Irshad Kamil (1971)
- Shakeel Azmi (1971)
- Hasnain Aaqib (1971)
- Akhtar Raza Saleemi (1974)
- Ali Akbar Natiq (1974)
- Hima Raza (1975)
- Khalid Irfan
- Sarim Momin (1978)
- Fuzail Ahmad Nasiri (1978)
- Atif Tauqeer (1979)

== 1980 ==
- Shabab Aalam (1984)
- Rahima Naz (1986)
- Imran Pratapgarhi (1987)
- Tehzeeb Hafi (1989)

== Non-Muslim Urdu poets ==
- Maharaja Chandu Lal Sadan (1766 – 1845)
- Mah Laqa Bai (1768-1824)
- Daya Shankar Kaul Nasim (1811–1845)
- Maharaja Sir Kishen Pershad, Shad (1864-1940)
- Brij Mohan Dattatreya Kaifi (1866 – 1955)
- Brij Narayan Chakbast (1882–1926)
- Tilok Chand Mehroom (1887–1966)
- Firaq Gorakhpuri (Raghupati Sahay) Firaq (1896–1982)
- Ram Prasad Bismil (1897–1927)
- Pandit Harichand Akhtar ('Akhtar') (1901–1958)
- Anand Narain Mulla (1901–1997)
- Khushtar Girami (Dewan Ram Rakhamal Kalia) (1902–1988)
- Gopal Mittal (1906–1993)
- Ratan Pandoravi (Rala Ram) Ratan (1907–1998)
- Arsh Malsiani (Bal Mukund) (1908–1979)
- Ahmed Ali(1910 – 1994)
- Sahir Hoshiarpuri (1913–1994)
- Mehr Lal Soni Zia Fatehabadi (1913–1986)
- Rishi Patialvi (Bam Dev Sharma) Rishi (1917–1999)
- Qamar Jalalabadi (1917 - 2003)
- Jagan Nath Azad (1918–2004)
- Bhupendra Nath Kaushik (1924 – 2007)
- Krishna Kumar Sharma (1924–2001)
- Kanwal Ziai Hardayal Singh Datta (1927–2012)
- Naresh Kumar Shad (1927–1969)
- Harbans Bhalla (1930–1993)
- Satyapal Anand (1931)
- Raj Pathria (1933)
- Dushyant Kumar (1933–1975)
- Rajendar Nath Rehbar (1931– 2022)
- Sudarshan Faakir (1934–2008)
- Mohinder Pratap Chand (1935)
- Mashal Sultanpuri (1937 – October 2020)
- Jayant Parmer (1954)
- Fahmi Badayuni (1952–2024)

== Contemporary poets ==
- Fuzail Ahmad Nasiri (b. 1978)

== Poets with unknown dates of birth ==
- Saleem Kausar,
- Shahin Badar,
- Siraj Aurangabadi,
- Ziauddin Ahmad,
- Sadhu Singh Hamdard
- Qamar Jalalabadi
- Kanwal Ziai

== Contemporary poets with unknown date of birth ==
- Kaif Bhopali
- Sayeed Quadri
- Khalid Irfan
- Kashmiri Lal Zakir
- A. M. Turaz

== See also ==
- List of Pakistani poets
- List of Pakistani writers
- List of Urdu-language writers
- List of Pakistanis
