= Lucknawi =

Lucknawi, Lucknavi, Lakhnavi or Lakhnawi is a Muslim surname from Urdu, meaning someone from Lucknow in India. It may refer to the following people:

- Abd al-Hayy al-Lucknawi (1848–1886), Indian Islamic scholar
- Aman Ali Khan Bahadur Ghalib Lakhnavi, Indian writer of Dastan-e-Amir Hamza (1871), an Urdu version of the Hamzanama
- Arzoo Lakhnavi (1873–1951), Urdu poet and lyricist
- Behzad Lucknavi (1900–1974), Pakistani poet and lyricist
- Majaz Lakhnawi (1911–1955), Indian Urdu poet and writer, uncle of Javed Akhtar
- Munavvar Lakhnavi (1897–1970), Indian Urdu poet
- Safi Lakhnavi (1862–1950), Indian Urdu poet
- Sahir Lakhnavi (1931–2019), Pakistani poet and writer
- Salik Lucknawi (1913–2013), pen name of the Indian Urdu poet and journalist Shaukat Riaz Kapoor
- Asar Lakhnavi (1885 -1967), Indian Urdu poet, critic, scholar, writer, translator
- Jalal Lakhnavi (1832/1834 - 1909), Indian poet and writer
- Mirza Lakhnavi, fictional Urdu poet in the 1960 Indian film Barsaat Ki Raat, portrayed by Bharat Bhushan

== See also ==
- Lucknow (disambiguation)
