= Mohsin Zaidi =

Indian poet of the Urdu language

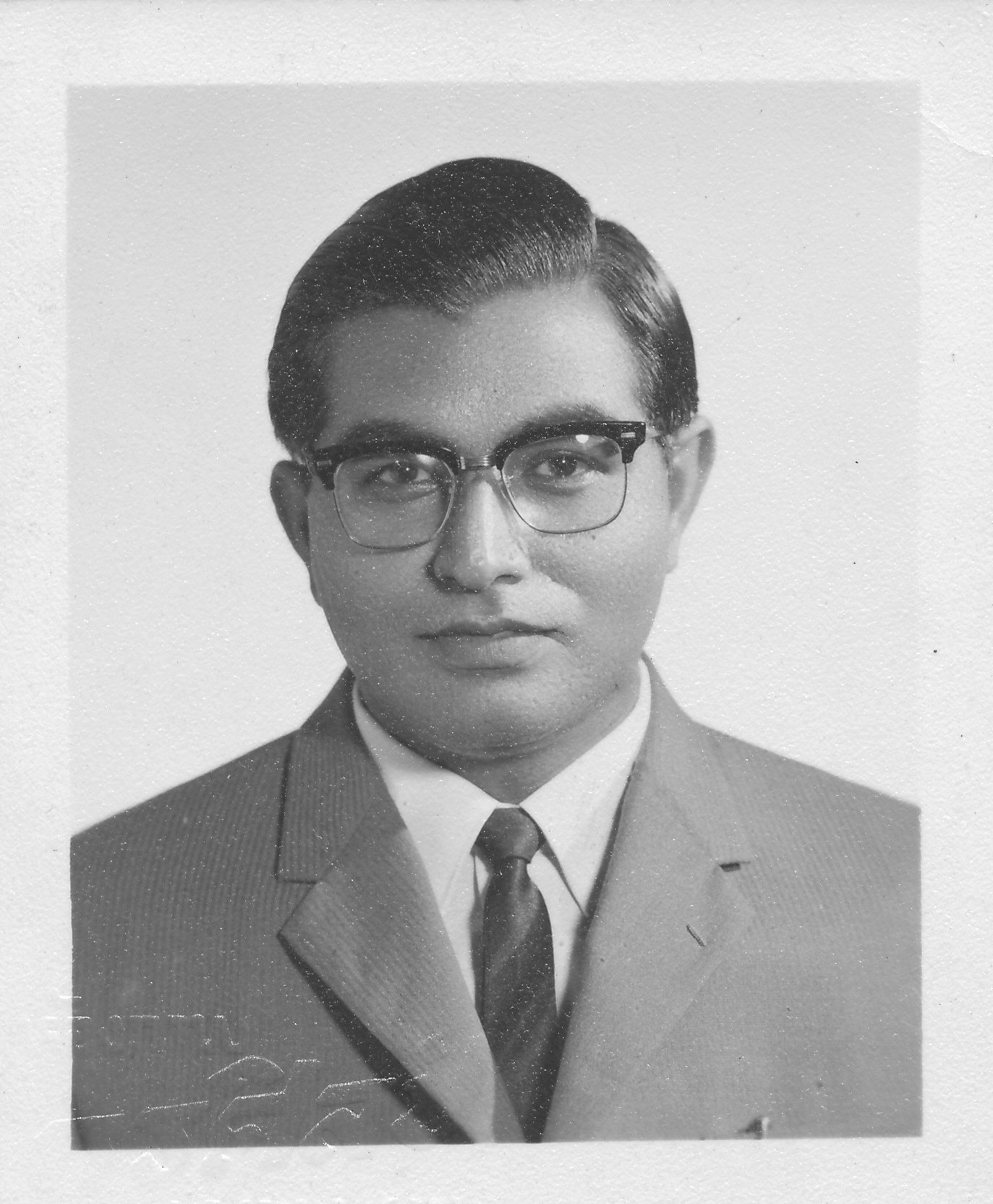
- Born: Saiyed Mohsin Raza Zaidi; 10 July 1935; Bahraich, United Provinces, British India
- Died: 3 September 2003 (aged 68); Lucknow, Uttar Pradesh, India
- Education: M.A. in economics
- Alma mater: Allahabad University
- Occupations: Urdu poet, Indian Economic Service bureaucrat
- Writing career
- Pen name: Mohsin
- Genre: Ghazal

Mohsin Zaidi (10 July 1935 – 3 September 2003) was an Indian Urdu poet who used the pen name 'Mohsin'. He is best known as a writer of ghazals, who expressed new ideas with this traditional form.

== Early life and education ==
Saiyed Mohsin Raza Zaidi (Urdu: سید محسن رضا زیدی) was born on 10 July 1935 in Bahraich, a town in the Indian state of Uttar Pradesh. His parents were Saiyed Ali Raza Zaidi and Sughra Begum.

Zaidi attended the Islamia School in Pratapgarh, K. P. Hindu High School, and Government High School through the 1940s. He started writing Urdu poetry in 1950 at the age of 15 while in high school in Pratapgarh. He attended Maharaj Singh Inter College, Bahraich, from 1951 to 1952.

He received his Bachelor of Arts degree in English literature, history and economics from Lucknow University in 1954, and a master's degree in economics from Allahabad University in 1956.

== Bureaucratic career ==
Zaidi joined the Indian Economic Service in 1956 and worked with the Government of India until his retirement in 1993. He held positions with the Central Government in the ministries of chemicals and fertilizers, labour, agriculture, and in the Planning Commission. He retired as a senior economist in the Senior Administrative Grade of Joint Secretary. As part of government assignments, he toured Japan, Singapore, Hong Kong, Taiwan, Indonesia, Malaysia, Thailand, and Algeria.

== Poetry ==
Zaidi was initially impressed by Nazish Pratapgarhi, yet his major inspiration came from Mir Taqi Mir, Momin Khan Momin, Mirza Ghalib, Haider Ali Aatish, Mir Anis, Daagh Dehlvi and Mir Dard. Among the neoclassical and modern poets his favourites were Muhammad Iqbal, Firaq Gorakhpuri, Faiz Ahmad Faiz, and Jigar Moradabadi.

Zaidi was a writer of ghazals, a traditional form of poetry utilizing specific diction and narration. The study of economics influenced Zaidi's poetry, which includes social commentary.

Kumar Pashi said that Zaidi was among the few poets who used traditional ghazal to express new ideas. Makhmoor Saeedi, a contemporary poet and Urdu critic, praised Zaidi's mastery at creating an impression while writing in simple and unadorned language. He noted Zaidi's themes: "integrity of character, opposition to all tyrannical powers, belief in retribution for one's actions, search for virtues in human nature, [and] belief in the victory of truth."

According to Shaarib Rudawlvi, Zaidi's work "had a freshness of thought, intense feelings, and dexterity of expression." He particularly noted the "spontaneity" of Zaidi's poetry which gracefully moved from one idea to another. He wrote that Zaidi's greatest quality was maintaining his unique style instead of bowing to the pressures of short-lived literary movements.

== Poetic works ==
- Shehr-e-Dil (1961)
- Rishtah-e-Kalaam (1978)
- Mataa-e-Aakhir-e-Shab (1990)
- Baab-e-Sukhan (2000)
- Jumbish-e-Nok-e-Qalam (2005)

== Death ==
Zaidi died in Lucknow on 3 September 2003.
