= Sahir Hoshiarpuri =

Indian writer & poet (1913–1994)

Sahir Hoshiarpuri ساحِر ہوشیارپُوری
- Born: Ram Prakash Sharma; 5 March 1913; Hoshiarpur, Punjab, British India
- Died: 18 December 1994 (aged 81); Faridabad, Haryana, India
- Occupation: Journalist
- Known for: Nazms, Ghazals

Sahir Hoshiarpuri (Urdu: ساحِر ہوشیارپُوری) (Hindi: साहिर होशियारपुर), born Ram Parkash Sharma (Urdu: رام پرکاش) (Hindi: राम प्रकाश) was an Urdu poet from India. He wrote several poetry books; his main form was ghazal. Moreover, his several ghazals have been sung by leading singers including Jagjit Singh.

== Biography ==
=== Early life ===
Sahir Hoshiarpuri was born on 5 March 1913 and raised in Hoshiarpur, Punjab, India. He received his education at Government College. He earned his M.A degree in Persian in 1935. He was a disciple of Josh Malsiyani who belonged to the Daagh School of Urdu Poetry. During his college days he came into contact with Mehr Lal Soni Zia Fatehabadi who was studying at Forman Christian College nearby Lahore, their friendship lasted a lifetime. They were both residing in Kanpur. He died on 18 December 1994 in Delhi, India.

== Literary career ==
Sahir Hoshiarpuri and Naresh Kumar Shad also edited and published the Urdu Journal Chandan.

He has written several books but only five published collections of him are available. In 1989 he was given the Ghalib Award by the Ghalib Institute in recognition of his literary contributions.

== See also ==
- List of Urdu language poets

== Bibliography ==
- Jal Tarang
- Sahar e ghazal (1959)
- Sahar e naghma (1970)
- Sahar e haraf (1982)
- Sahar e khayal (1990)
- Nuqoosh e Dagh
