= Zulfiqar Naqvi =

Indian poet

- ذوالفقار نقوی
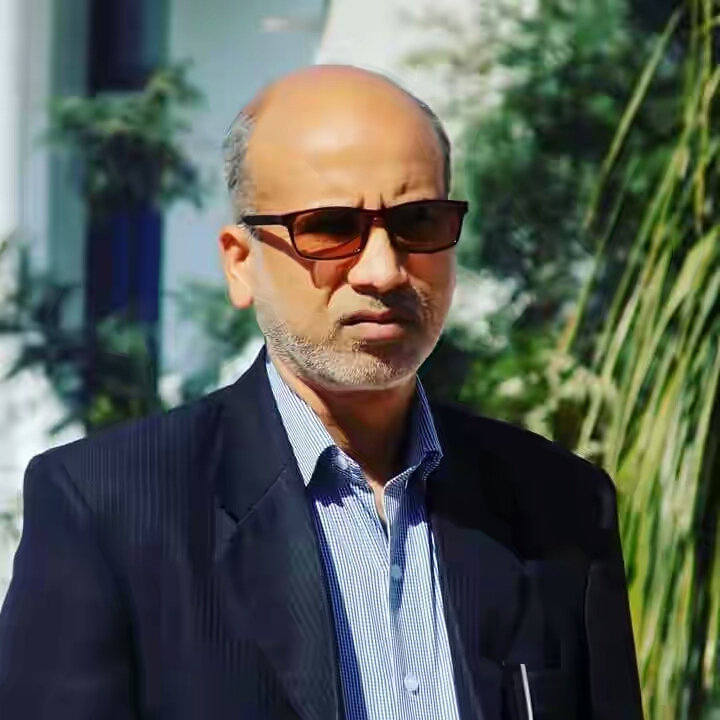
- Former Principal at Department of School Education Govt. of J&K Former Announcer All India Radio Poonch Member, Muslim Personal Law Board, J&K CEO/Founder Al-Mahdi Library, Mendhar Executive Director, Global Peace Organization (G-PEACE)
- Born: Syed Zulfiqar Ali Naqvi; 10 June 1965 (age 61); Mendhar, Poonch, Jammu and Kashmir, India
- Occupations: Former Principal, Zonal Education Officer
- Spouse: Sayeda Zakia Fatima
- Children: Sayed Mannan Haider; Sayeda Farah Naqvi; Advocate Khurram Abbas Naqvi
- Parents: Ali Haider Shah Naqvi; Noor Fatima
- Writing career
- Language: Urdu, English
- Years active: 2005
- Notable works: Zaad-e-Safar (2011); Ujaalu'n Ka Safar (2013); DASHT-E-WAHSHAT (2021)
- Website: Official website

Zulfiqar Naqvi, born in Gursai village in Mendhar Tehsil near LoC in District Poonch of Jammu and Kashmir. He is an Urdu poet and has authored Three Books, ZAAD-E-SAFAR in 2011, UJAALU'N KA SAFAR in 2013, DASHT-E-WAHSHAT in 2021.

== Career ==
In 2022 he became a Principal in Department of School Education, Government of Jammu and Kashmir.

== See also ==
- List of Urdu-language poets
- Farooq Nazki
- Javed Akhtar
- Gulzar
- Rahat Indori
- Munawwar Rana
