= Qayem Chandpuri =

Indian poet

- Born: Muhammad Qayemuddin Ali; 1722; Chandpur, Dist. Bijnor, Uttar Pradesh
- Died: 1793 (aged 70–71); Rampur
- Known for: Poetry
- Notable work: Kulliyaat e Qayem

Muhammad Qyamuddin Ali, known as Qaim Chandpuri or Kayem Chandpuri (1722-1793), was an Indian poet.

== Life ==
He was born in Chandpur, Bijnor (at the time part of the Mughal Empire) and died in Rampur, Uttar Pradesh. He was a contemporary of Mir Taqi Mir, Khwaja Mir Dard, Mirza Muhammad Rafi Sauda, Qalandar Bakhsh Jurat and Mashafi He wrote ghazals.
