= Tilok Chand Mehroom =

Indian Urdu poet (1887–1966)

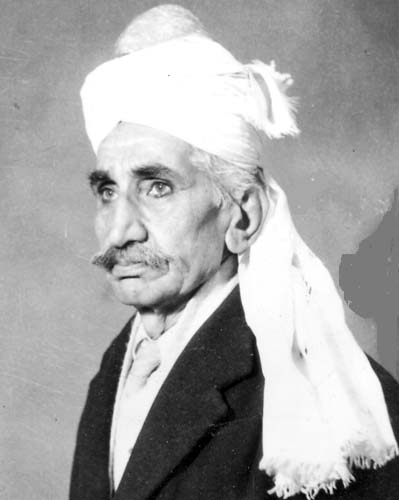
- Born: 1 July 1887; Mianwali, Punjab Province, British India
- Died: 6 January 1966 (aged 78)
- Occupations: Poet; Writer; Learning
- Writing career
- Period: 20th century

Signature
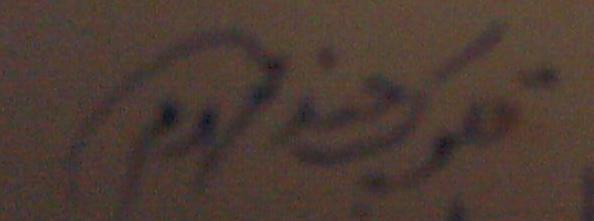

Tilok Chand Mehroom (1 July 1887 – 6 January 1966) was an Indian Urdu poet who was admired not only for his writings but also for his simple lifestyle and evident deep dislike of religious discrimination.

== Early life ==
Mehroom was born in the village of Mousa Noor Zaman Shah (Mianwali District, Punjab (now Pakistan) on 1 July 1887. The small village, consisting of some 20–25 homes, was under constant threat of flooding from the Indus River and was destroyed and rebuilt many times before his family gave up their farm and shop and moved to Isakhel.

== Education ==
At the age of 6/7 years he joined the Vernacular Middle School where he topped the class every year and received scholarships in the 5th & 8th years. He passed the matriculation examination in 1907 attaining a first class certificate from the Diamond Jubilee School, Bannu (there was no high school in Isakhel). Following this, he entered the Central Training College, Lahore where he trained as a teacher and graduated with BA degree.

== Career ==
In 1908 he joined the Mission High School at Dera Ismail Khan as a teacher of English. Shortly afterwards he transferred to Isakhel for domestic reasons. His concern about the lack of clean water in Isakhel led to his move to Kaloorkote as headmaster of the local middle school in 1924.

Following his son's (Jagan Nath Azad's) move to Rawalpindi in 1933 for higher education, Mehroom sought a transfer there and accepted the post of headmaster at the Cantonment Board School. He worked there till 1943. He was the first headmaster of school which is now famous as F.G.Technical High School. Tariq abad (Lalkurti) Rawalpindi.

A short time later, he became a lecturer in Urdu and Persian at Gordon College. The partition of India brought his stay in Rawalpindi to an end. He left the College in December 1947 and moved permanently to Delhi, India. He returned to Gordon College in 1953 for its Golden Jubilee celebrations.

On arrival in Delhi, he was appointed Editor of Tej Weekly, the literary section of Tej Daily, for a brief period.

The Government of India approved Punjab University's (divided at the time of partition of India) proposal to open a college in Delhi to deal with the issue of adult education for refugees. Camp College was established in Hastings School and Mehroom was appointed to the post of Professor of Urdu. He held this post until his retirement in December 1957.

Mehroom died on 6 January 1966 after an illness of five weeks.

Jagan Nath Azad, his son, donated Mehroom's collection of books to the Allama Iqbal Library, University of Kashmir, where they are now classified as the Tilok Chand Mehroom Collection.

== Poetry ==
There were no libraries in the schools of North West Frontier Province when Mehroom was growing up. With no formal training or instruction and very limited access to literary works, it is remarkable that he developed a love of poetry and achieved acclaim as a poet himself. He found, read eagerly and was inspired by poetry collections of Mirza Ghalib and Mohammad Ibrahim Zauq during his 4 years in Bannu. He wrote simple couplets whilst still at primary school, but it was in Bannu that he started taking his writing seriously. He composed a nazm entitled Khidmat-e-Validain when he was about 12/13 years old. It earned him the praise not only from the Divisional Inspector of Schools but also from the Director of Education.

By the time he finished his studies at Diamond Jubilee School (Bannu), his poems were being published in Makhzan (Lahore) and Zamana (Kanpur). Once he moved to Rawalpindi, he became a frequent invitee to the annual mushairas organised by Khwaja Abdul Raheem in Lyallpur (now Faisalabad). Regulars to these mushairas included Jigar Moradabadi and Hafeez Jullundhri among others.

After the death of his beloved wife, Mehroom wrote poems reflecting his disenchantment with the ephemerality of life and the instability of relationships. The most famous of these is Ashk-e-Hasrat (part of his collection entitled Toofan-e-Gham).

Mehroom's first major publication was Ganj-e-Ma'ani which contained a rich variety of 175 nazms as well as many rubais, qasidas, sehras, and nohas. Poets and literary critics like Niaz Fatehpuri, Muhammad Iqbal, Firaq Gorakhpuri, Kaifi Azmi, Josh Malsiani and Ejaz Hussain have admired his poetry.

== Ethics and views ==
Born in a Hindu family, Mehroom grew up in a predominantly Muslim community. This mix of cultures in his early years was greatly influential on his thinking. When his daughter Shakuntala died, her remains were buried (Muslim manner), not cremated (Hindu way). He gave precedence to "the man" over "his religion". When he died, his pall-bearers were two Hindus, one Muslim and one Sikh, and the Dasween (ceremony performed on the 10th day after death) included recitals from the Vedas and Bhagavad Gita (Hindu), the Qur'an (Muslim) and Sukhmani Sahib (Sikh).

Mehroom was not a political activist but, as with much literature of this period, some of his poems reflect the political unrest in the country. His friendship with Allama Sir Muhammad Iqbal did not dissuade him from disagreeing with Allama's proposals for India's independence at the Round Table Conference in London.

== Honours and awards ==
The annual Sahitya Samaroh (literary convention) of the Government of Punjab, India dedicated its 1962 session to Mehroom for his "services to literature" and presented him with a robe of honour, a testimonial and a purse (Forty-five years earlier, the contemporary Government of Punjab had awarded him a cash prize for his service to literature).

== Famous works ==
- Ganj-e-Maani (Latest edition published by Mehroom Memorial Literary Society, New Delhi, India – 1995)
- Rubaiyat-e-Mehroom (Latest edition published by Mehroom Memorial Literary Society, New Delhi, India – 1995)
- Nairang-e-Maani (Latest edition published by Mehroom Memorial Literary Society, New Delhi, India – 1996)
- Karwan-e-Watan (Published by Maktaba-e-Jamia Ltd, New Delhi, India – 1960)
- Shola Nawa (Published by Maktaba-e-Jamia Ltd, New Delhi, India – 1965)
- Bahar-e-Tifli (Published by Maktaba-e-Jamia Ltd, New Delhi, India – 1965)
- Bachchon Ki Duniya (Published by Maktaba-e-Jamia Ltd, New Delhi, India – 1967)
- Maharishi Darshan (Published by Aiwan-e-Adab, Lahore, British India – 1937)
