= List of people from Jhelum =

This is the list of notable people from Jhelum city and Jhelum District.

== A ==
- Aftab Iqbal Shamim, Urdu language poet
- Afzal Khan (British politician), British Member of Parliament for Manchester Gorton
- General Asif Nawaz Janjua, former chief of army staff of Pakistan
- Azeem Hafeez, former Pakistani cricket team

== B ==
- Bhai Mati Das, Indian Sikh martyrs

== C ==
- Chaudhry Altaf Hussain, politician and former governor of Punjab

== G ==
- Ghulam Hussain, politician and doctor
- Gulzar, Indian poet and film director

== H ==
- Hasnat Ahmad Khan, a heart surgeon in Britain, also known as an ex-lover of Lady Diana

== I ==
- Inder Kumar Gujral, former prime minister of India

== J ==
- Jagjit Singh Aurora, Indian army officer
- Jaswant Singh Neki, Indian scholar and poet

== K ==
- Khalid Masud, Muslim scholar

== M ==
- M. Afzal Khan, British politician
- Masood Aslam, Pak army officer
- Mirza Ibrahim, Pakistani politician
- Major Muhammad Akram, Pak army officer, Nishan-e-Haider awarded
- Manmohan Singh, former prime minister of India was born in village of Gah, district Chakwal, then part of Jhelum District
- Muhammad Ali Mirza, Engineer and Islamic preacher

== N ==
- Nawabzada Raja Matloob Mehdi, politician
- Nanak Singh, Indian writer and poet
- Nasser Azam, British artist

== R ==
- Raja Ghazanfar Ali Khan, politician and a leader of Pakistan Movement

== S ==
- Sunil Dutt, Bollywood actor
- Satish Gujral, Indian painter and sculptor

== T ==
- Admiral Tariq Kamal Khan, Chief of Naval Staff

== U ==
- Usama Jawad Jami, Urdu Poet, Youngest Bearu Chief of News Channel.

== Z ==
- Zafar Chaudhry, first chief of air staff of the Pakistan Air Force he was born in Sialkot
- Zamir Jafri, writer and poet.
