= Shifa Gwaliori =

Urdu poet

Dr Shifa Gwaliori
- Born: Shifa Gwaliori; 1912; Gwalior, Gwalior State
- Died: 1968 (aged 56)
- Occupation: Poet

Shifa Gwaliori (1912–1968) was an Urdu poet. He has written ghazals and nazms.

== Biography ==
Shifa Gwaliori was born in Gwalior, Gwalior State. He was a disciple of the Urdu poet Seemab Akbarabadi. He has published three poetry collections. Madhya Pradesh Urdu Academy has instituted the annual Shifa Gwaliori Award as a literary award, first awarded in 2010.

== See also ==
- List of Urdu language poets

== Bibliography ==
- Ayaat-e-Shifa
- Nabz-e Hayaat
- Zakhm-e-Gul
