= Shahr Ashob =

Urdu poetic genre

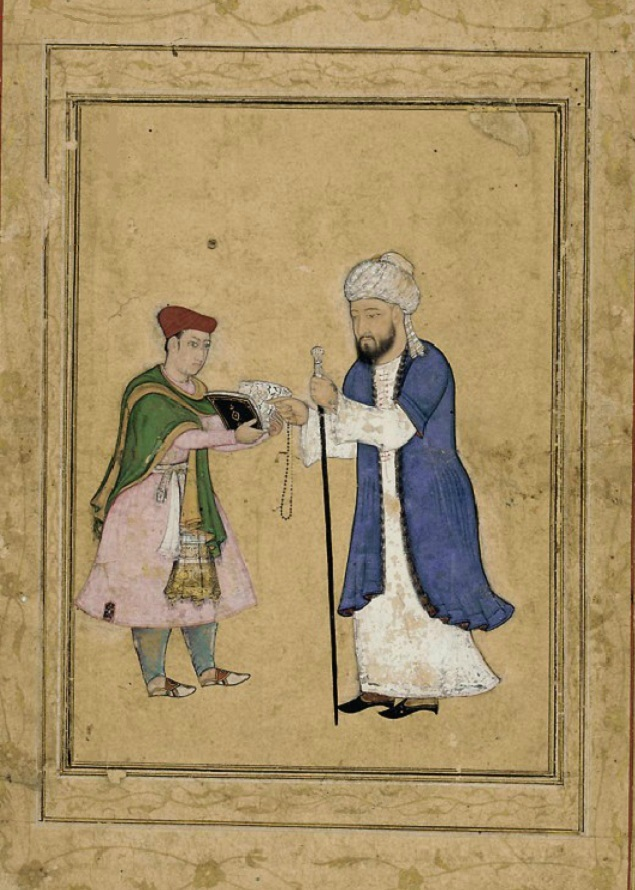
- Khawaja Hafiz reciting poetry at Mughal court
- Stylistic origins: Mughal Empire
- Authors: Masud Sa'd Salman; Mir Taqi Mir; Mirza Muhammad Rafi Sauda; Qaim Chandpuri

Related genres
- Qasida, Marsiya

The Shahr Ashob (Persian: شهر آشوب; Shahr-i Ashob (lit. 'The city's misfortune'), sometimes spelled Shahar-i Ashūb or Shahrashub, is a genre that becomes prominent in Urdu poetry in South Asia with its roots in classical Persian and Urdu poetic lamentations. The genre has early medieval origins in the twelfth century or earlier, but came to be as widely used by poets beginning in the late Mughal Empire and the post-Mughal era in the eighteenth and nineteenth centuries. Ashob is regarded by scholars as an important historical genre in Persian, Urdu and Turkish literature used by the writers to express their anguish and sorrows over political and social shifts.

The Ashobs generally describe emotions and thoughts of a writer in a narrative poetic format based on several features. It begins with a detailed depiction of a particular moment (such as war or invasion, often historical), delivered in a tone of anguish. It consists of five to six stanzas normally written in rhymed verse for the first four lines. The first line rhymes with the second, third and fourth, and the fifth line rhymes with none of these, but sums up the emotions expressed therein. (Note: Neither the rhyming form of the Ashob nor the use of the stanzas is explained in the inline citations added to this article. They've only mentioned a few Ashobs that make it clear how it is written.)

== History ==
Ashob originally came into existence in the 16th century. It was first introduced in south Asia by the Mughal poets, including Masud Sa'd Salman, who started writing Ashobs during his literary career. Some ashobs were also written by Shakir Naji who served in the Army of the Mughal Empire during Muhammad Shah's reign. When the king was defeated, he covered major impacts of military conflict on the Mughal kingdom. An Indian poet Qayem Chandpuri was also engaged in writing ashobs. His writing covered civil–military relations, mainly military aid between the sixteenth Mughal ruler Shah Alam II and Maratha Empire in order to defeat Zabita Khan in 1772. Some prominent poets, including Mir Taqi Mir and Mirza Muhammad Rafi Sauda are also credited with "ashob writings". Mirza wrote a list of ashobs on Nader Shah's invasion of India, while Mir wrote on economic crisis of Delhi.

Later (around 1708–1710), ashob was merely used after the death of Aurangzeb in 1707, and since then it began disappearing until the British rule made several people flee across the Indian subcontinent to the neighboring states or countries. It is believed the ashob was popularized during the 1857 uprising in India, but later it was not used in the modern literature.

== Poems written in ashobs ==
Ashob by Qaim Chandpuri (Note: The poem contains English translation of the original poem that may contain minor errors)

What kind of King is he who is intent on injustice?

An entire world is protesting against him

A lout himself, has a brigand army

The honour of the people is defiled by his rule

He is the shadow of Satan, not the shadow of God.

Ashob by Mirza Muhammad Rafi Sauda (Note: per previous note)

You were once the heart of lovers, many

Why has it been destroyed as if a lie by destiny?

T'was a wondrous beach in the sea of plenty

Precious stones on your shores galore.

Ashob by Mir Taqi Mir (Note: per previous note)

My friends all seemed to death, near

Whoever I met had lost all possessions, once so dear

Poverty seems to be a cross all have to bear

If one had a thread, no rope was in sight here

If one had a carpet, there were none to roll it out.

In 1979, a writer named Naeem Ahmad wrote a book on Shahr Ashob's birth titled Shahr Ashob Ka Tahqiqi Mutalaah (A Brief study of the Shahr Ashob). The book, currently serving only in Urdu language, was later published by the University of California.

== Books ==
- Ahmad, Naeem (1979). Shahr ashob ka tahqiqi mutalaah. University of California. p. 319.
