= Saleem Kausar =

Poet from Pakistan

Saleem Kausar سلیم کوثر
- Born: Muhammad Saleem; 24 October 1947 (age 78); Panipat, East Punjab, India
- Occupation: Poet
- Known for: Ghazal, "Main khayal hoon kisi aur ka"
- Awards: Pride of Performance Award by the Government of Pakistan in 2015

Saleem Kausar (Urdu: سلیم کوثر), born Muhammad Saleem (Urdu: محمد سلیم) is a Pakistani Urdu poet. He has published several poetry books and written various title songs for different TV serials. Kausar has attended poetry symposiums (Mushaira) in various countries.

== Personal life ==
Kausar was born on 24 October 1947 in Panipat, India. After partition, his family migrated to Pakistan and settled in Khanewal, Punjab, Pakistan. He received his primary and secondary education there. Later he moved to Kabeerwala with his family. In 1972, he shifted to Karachi, Sindh, where he worked in various newspapers before joining Pakistan Television (PTV). He retired several years ago.

== Literary career ==
Kausar began his literary career from Kabeerwala, where he met with well-known and national poets and learnt and practiced Urdu poetry. He also attended poetry gatherings. After moving to Karachi, he joined Urdu newspapers and wrote Qat'aas (quatrains), a form of Urdu poetry, on a daily basis. He has written five collections of Urdu poetry. He became famous after his ghazal "Main khiyal hoon kisi aur ka" was first sung by various singers in 1980. He has visited several countries to participate in poetry symposiums, including the United States, United Kingdom, Canada, Denmark, India, Qatar, and other countries in the Middle East.

A writer says;

"He may not be rich in the literal sense of the word, but he is generous enough to share the fruit of his craft to make people happy:

Piyar karnay kay liyay, geet sunanay kay liyay
Ik khazana hai maray pass lutanay kay liyay

(To love and to sing songs, I have a treasure to lavish upon others.)"

== Awards ==
- Received Pride of Performance Award from Governor of Sindh, Ishratul Ibad on 23 March 2015.

== Bibliography ==
- Muhabbat aik shajar ha 1994 محبت اِک شجر ہے
- Khali haathon mein arz-o-sama 1980خالی ہاتھوں میں ارض و سماء
- Yeh chiragh hai tau jala rahai 1987یہ چراغ ہے تو جلا رہے
- Zara mausam badalnay dau 1991ذرا موسم بدلنے دو
- Duniya meri aarzoo se kam hey 2007 دنیا مری آرزو سے کم ہے

جنہیں راستے میں خبر ہوئی '

== See also ==
- List of Pakistani poets
- List of Urdu language poets
