= Tabish Mehdi =

Indian poet (1951–2025)

- Born: Mehdi Hasan Tabish; 3 July 1951; Pratapgarh, Uttar Pradesh, India
- Died: 22 January 2025 (aged 73); Delhi, India
- Education: Tajweed and Qira'at; M.A. (Urdu); Ph.D.
- Alma mater: Agra University; Jamia Millia Islamia
- Occupations: Poet; critic; journalist; writer
- Years active: 1971–2025
- Movement: Jamaat-e-Islami Hind
- Spouse: Razia Usmani (m. 1979)

Tabish Mehdi (3 July 1951 – 22 January 2025) was an Indian poet specialising in naʽat, a literary critic, journalist, and author who made contributions to Urdu literature. His literary career spanned several decades, during which he worked in the fields of poetry, literary criticism, and research. His writings have been described by some commentators as reflecting intellectual depth and creativity. Mehdi's work has been acknowledged for its role in Urdu literary circles.

== Early life and education ==
Tabish Mehdi was born on 3 July 1951 in Pratapgarh, Uttar Pradesh, India. He completed his Junior Primary School examination in 1964 from District Board Pratapgarh. In 1966 and 1967, he studied Tajwīd and Qirā'at al-Sab'a at Madrasa Subhania, Allahabad, and Madrasa Taleem-ul-Quran, Hasanpur, Moradabad, respectively.

In 1970, he passed the Maulvi (Arabic) examination from the Arabic and Persian Board, Allahabad. In 1978 and 1980, he passed the Munshi (Persian) and Kamil (Persian) examinations, respectively. In 1971, he obtained the Aalim-e-Deeniyat (Urdu) degree from Jamia Deeniyat, Deoband, and in 1977 and 1985, he earned the Adeeb-e-Mahir and Adeeb-e-Kamil (Urdu) qualifications from Jamia Urdu, Aligarh. Finally, in 1989, he completed an M.A. in Urdu from Agra University, and in 1997, he earned a Ph.D. in Urdu criticism from Jamia Millia Islamia, Delhi.

His literary mentors included Shahbaz Amrohi (disciple of Afaq Kazmi), Bilali Aliabadi (disciple of Shafiq Jaunpuri), Sarosh Machhlishahri (student of Arzoo Lakhnavi), Abu-al-Wafa Arif Shahjahanpuri (disciple of Riyaz Khairabadi), and Amir Usmani.

== Career ==
=== Teaching career ===
In July 1971, Mehdi began his teaching career at Abul Kalam Azad College, Pratapgarh, where he served until July 1973. From January 1974 to June 1978, he taught at Darul Uloom Amroha. Later, he worked as a teacher at Jamiatul Falah Arabic College, Bilariaganj, Azamgarh, from June 1986 to April 1990. From April 2018 until his death, he taught Tajwīd and Qirā'at at the Islamic Academy, Jamaat-e-Islami Hind, Delhi.

=== Journalism ===
Mehdi served as the editor of several publications, including the fortnightly Paigham-e-Haq (Pratapgarh), Ijtima (Deoband), and Al-Iman (Deoband). He was also an associate editor for magazines such as Gul Kada (Sahaswan, Budaun), Zikra (Rampur), Tajalli (Deoband), Zindagi-e-Nau (New Delhi), and Aiwan-e-Urdu (Delhi Urdu Academy). Additionally, he worked as a guest editor for Kitab Numa (Delhi).

From April 2002 until his death, he was a member of the editorial board of Peshraft (Delhi), and from January 2005 onwards, he served as an honorary advisor and editorial board member for the quarterly Karwan-e-Adab (Lucknow).

=== Affiliation with academic and literary institutions ===
From June 1991 to 3 July 2009, Mehdi worked as an editor at Markazi Maktaba Islami Publishers, New Delhi. He was a founding member of Abul Kalam Azad Inter College (Pratapgarh) and Idara Adab-e-Islami Hind. He was also a member of the Islamic Literary Society (India) and Darul Dawah Educational Foundation (Delhi). Additionally, he served as the chairman of Adabiat-e-Aaliya Academy (Lucknow), a former vice-president of Idara Adab-e-Islami Hind, and an honorary advisor and editorial board member of the quarterly Karwan-e-Adab (Lucknow).

== Awards and honours ==
Mehdi was honored with several awards for his literary and scholarly contributions. Notable among them are the "Hazrat Hassan Award" (2005) by All India Hamd-o-Naat Academy, Delhi; "Shan-e-Adab Award" (2011) by Bazm-e-Adab, Deoband; "Nishan-e-Urdu" (2013) by Urdu Academy, Nepal; "Rasikh Azimabadi Award" (2013) by Bihar Urdu Academy, Patna; "Zia Fatehabadi Award" (2014) by Mehr Foundation, Maharashtra; "Fareevai Award" (2014) by Fareevai Academy, Allahabad; Award for Urdu Poetry (2015) by Urdu Academy, Delhi; National Integration Award with the title of Iftikhar-e-Adab (2021) by Bazm-e-Urdu, Sitapur; and the "Allama Iqbal Award" for Poetry and Literature (2021) by Urdu Development Organization of India. Additionally, he was recognized by the academies of Bengal, Delhi, Uttar Pradesh, and various local institutions for his books. All India Radio's Urdu Service, Urdu Majlis, Doordarshan, Jain TV, Sahara TV, and Zee Salaam frequently invited him to present his work.

== Literary works ==
Mehdi wrote several works in poetry, criticism, and analytical writing, including Abūlmujāhid Zāhid: fikr aur fan, Kankar bolte hen̲: shiʻrī majmūʻah, Muʻallim-i insāniyat ṣallalláhu ʻalaihi va sallam, Naqd-i g̲h̲azal, Rabāb Rashīdī: ek suk̲h̲an var piyārā sā, Shafīq Jaunpūrī, ek mut̤ālaʻah (2002), Ṣubḥ-i ṣādiq: ḥamd, naʻt, manqabat, Tasawwuf yeh hai!, T̤ūbá and Urdū tanqīd kā safar: Jāmiʻah Milliyah Islāmiyah ke tanāẓur men̲. His other publications include:

- Naqsh-e-Awwal (1971)
- Lama‘at-e-Haram (1975)
- Ta‘beer (1989)
- Jamaat-e-Islami Haqeeqat ke Aaine Mein (1981)
- Sall-e-Ala Sall-e-Ala (1992)
- Urdu Tanqeed Ka Safar (1999)
- Woh Galiyan Yaad Aati Hain (2007)
- Hali, Shibli aur Iqbal (2017)
- Mu'allim-e-Insāniyat (2019)
- Mutshid-e-Thānwi (2019)
- Ghazal Khwani Nahin Jati (2020)

== Personal life and death ==
On 18 May 1979, Mehdi married Razia Usmani, the granddaughter of calligrapher Ishtiaq Ahmad Usmani and the daughter of Mumtaz Ahmad Usmani, from Deoband. The couple had seven children, including two sons, Shah Danish Farooq Falahi and Shah Ajmal Farooq Nadwi, and four daughters, Sameena Tabish Salehati, Tooba Kausar Salehati, Yamna Kulsoom, and Naeema Kulsoom.

Mehdi died in Delhi on 22 January 2025, at the age of 73.
