= Tehzeeb Hafi =

Tehzeeb Hafi (Urdu: تہذیب حافی}; born Tehzeeb-ul-Hasan on 5 December 1989) is a Pakistani Urdu poet known for his ghazals and nazms, and for the wide circulation of his verses on social media.
