= Fahmi Badayuni =

Indian poet (1952–2024)

- Born: 4 January 1952; Budaun, Uttar Pradesh, India
- Died: 20 October 2024 (aged 72)
- Occupation(s): Poet, writer

Zaman Sher Khan or Puttan Khan (4 January 1952 – 20 October 2024), better known by the pen name Fahmi Badayuni, was an Indian poet known for his contributions to Urdu literature. Fahmi's poetry often revolved around themes of love, beauty, and human emotions, expressed in an eloquent yet simple style. His ghazals are remembered for their lyrical quality and the depth of feeling they convey.

== Early life and education ==
Fahmi was born on 4 January 1952 in Pathan Tola Mohalla, Bisauli town, Budaun, Uttar Pradesh. After completing his studies, he initially worked as a Lekhpal but soon realized that the job did not suit him. In the 1980s, he turned towards poetry and began participating in mushairas (poetry recitals) in Bisauli and surrounding areas, marking the beginning of his journey as a poet.

== Literary works ==
Fahmi Badayuni authored several notable books including:

- Majmooay
- Paanchvi Simt
- Dastaken Nigaahon Ki
- Hijr Ki Doosri Dawa
- Prem
- Akulta

His poetry was characterized by his ability to express deep thoughts in few words, a skill that was also influenced by his understanding of mathematics. His couplets often reflected profound philosophical aspects and various dimensions of human experience.

== Death ==
On 20 October 2024, Fahmi died at his home in Bisauli, at the age of 72. Poet Wasim Barelvi expressed deep grief over the demise of Badayuni, stating "today a great poet has left us."
