= Naresh Kumar Shad =

Indian poet (1927–1969)

- Born: Naresh Kumar; 11 December 1927. Ahiyapur, Urmar Tanda, District Hoshiarpur, Punjab, India.
- Died: 1969; Delhi, India.
- Occupations: Journalism, Government service
- Known for: Nazms, Ghazals, Journalist, Qat'aa

Naresh Kumar Shad (1927–1969) was a ghazal, qat'aa and rubai writer.

== Biography ==
Naresh Kumar Shad was born in Ahiyapur, Urmar Tanda, District Hoshiarpur, on 11 December 1927. His father, Nauhariya Ram Dard Nakodari, was a prominent and well-known Urdu journalist and poet writer, very famous back in those days. Born to a Bhalla family of Nakodar, a small Kasba town in Jallandhar, he inherited fluent use of Urdu and Persian from his father. Naresh Kumar Shad did his high school from Govt. High School Chunian. His wife's name was Varsha Shad, and the couple had a son, Rakesh Shad. Kartik and Akash Shad are their grandchildren. He got a government job, was posted at Rawalpindi, and was later transferred to Jallandhar. He was only 22 when his first poetry collection, Dastak, was published by a small publisher in Jallandhar in August 1950. Earlier on, he used to write under the pen name of Shad Nakodari, Nakodar being his hometown, but later on, as he explained in his book named Wijdan in 1966, he chose not to use his hometown in his pen name and chose Shad as his pen name. His first book, Dastak, was very popular in Urdu shayari circles, and Shad got an instant shot at popularity with its success. By far, his only close rival from Punjab was Sahir Ludhianvi.

== Literary career ==
Naresh Kumar Shad was a disciple of Labhu Ram Josh Malsiyani (1883–1976), a disciple of Nawab Mirza Daagh Dehalvi. He wrote ghazals, which became very popular even when he was alive, but his forte was Qat'aa and Rubai. His two collections of poetry, Qashen and Kalaam e Muntakhab, were published during his lifetime. After his demise, Naresh Kumar Shad Memorial Committee published Shad Namah in 1970, that contained his poems and articles appraising his literary output. Later on, Shad ki Shayari, Shad aur Akhtar ki shayari, and Adabi latife came to light.

== Bibliography ==
- Lalkar
- Dastak
- Qashen
- Wijdan
- Shad Namah
- Shad aur uski Shayari
