= Shakeb Jalali =

Pakistani poet (1934–1966)

- Born: Syed Hassan Rizvi; 1 October 1934; Jalal, Aligarh, British India
- Died: 12 November 1966 (aged 32); Sargodha, Punjab, Pakistan
- Citizenship: Pakistan
- Occupation: Poet
- Writing career
- Pen name: Shakeb Jalali
- Period: post-independence era
- Genre: Ghazal
- Notable work: Roushani Ae Roushani (1972)

Shakeb Jalali or Shakeeb Jalali (Urdu: شکیب جلالی), born Syed Hassan Rizvi (1 October 1934 – 12 November 1966), was a Pakistani Urdu poet, considered one of the distinguished Urdu poets of the post-Independence era.

Shakeb was born on 1 October 1934 in Jalal, a small village near Aligarh. His ancestors were from a small town, Saddat, near Aligarh. He took his own life on 12 November 1966 by throwing himself before a passing train near Sargodha, Pakistan.

== Poetry and works ==
Shakib Jalali's poetry had a unique style and gave a modern tone to Urdu Ghazal. His first collection of poetry, Roushni Aye Roushni, was published posthumously in 1972. Sang-e-Meel published his complete poetical works as Kulliyat-e-Shakeb Jalali in 2004.

== Death and legacy ==
Shakib Jalali died by suicide under a train on 12 November 1966 at the age of 32 in Sargodha, Pakistan.

Jalali's death anniversary is celebrated every year, and he is remembered for his unique and innovative contributions to Urdu ghazal. His work is still included in important collections of Urdu poetry.

== See also ==
- List of Urdu Poets
