= Mohammad Alvi =

Indian poet

- Born: April 10, 1927; Ahmedabad, India
- Died: January 29, 2018 (aged 90); Ahmedabad, India
- Education: Jamia Millia Islamia
- Occupation: Poet
- Writing career
- Language: Urdu
- Genres: Gazal, Nazm
- Notable work: Chautha Aasmaan
- Notable awards: Sahitya Academy Award

Mohammad Alvi (10 April 1927 – 29 January 2018; sometimes spelled Mohammed Alvi) was an Indian poet known for writing Urdu gazals, particularly a collection of Urdu gazals titled Chautha Aasmaan (4th sky) which became a subject of dispute between the Muslims scholars when he wrote a couplet titled "send a good prophet". He was later referred to as a "kafir" through a fatwa by the Imam of Jama Masjid in 1994, and he subsequently withdrew the line from his book after he was criticised by the Islamic theology school, Ahmedabad.

The recipient of Sahitya Academy Award in 1992 for Chautha Aasmaan poetry and Ghalib Award by Ghalib Academy, he is believed to have significantly contributed to Urdu literature. His authorship includes eighty-six gazals, sixty-six nazms, some couplets and four books, including Khali Makaan, a poetic book comprising gazals.

== Biography ==
He was born on 10 Apr 1927 in Ahmedabad, Gujarat. He received his early education in his hometown. Later, he went to Delhi where he completed higher education from Jamia Millia Islamia.

=== Publications ===
#	Title	Year	Type/Credited as	Remarks
1	Khali Makaan	1963	Book	—N/a
2	Akhri Din ki Talash	1967	Book	—N/a
3	Tisri Kitaab	1978	Book	—N/a
4	Chautha Aasmaan	1992	Book	The book was awarded Sahitya Akademi Award in 1992
5	Raat Idhar Udhar Raushan	1995	Book	—N/a
