= Nushoor Wahidi =

Hafeez-ul-Rehman c. 1912 – c. 1983, known by his pen name Nushoor Wahidi (Urdu: نشور وحیدی; sometimes spelled Nushoor Wahedi or Nushoor Vahidi), was an Indian Urdu poet.

== Early life ==
Born in 1912 in the village of Sheikhpur, Ballia District, United Province (renamed as Uttar Pradesh after the Indian independence), Wahidi had seven siblings. He received his early education at home.

Wahidi had begun to compose poems from an early age and by the age of 13 had become known in his locality as a poet.

== Career ==
Wahidi was in a poetry session featuring the famous poet Jigar Moradabadi. Jigar Moradabadi had been reciting poems for some time and desired to take a break. Wahidi offered to come on stage and recite a few of his own poems while Jigar Moradabadi did so. It was in this forum that Nushoor was first recognized by the literary circles as a poet.

Nushoor published several compilations of Urdu poetry and a volume on philosophy, named the Sabah-e-hind.

== Personal life ==
Wahidi died in 1983. The Indian prime minister, Indira Gandhi, personally called his family to condole his death.

A park in the city of Kanpur, India has been named in his honor.

== Ghazal ==
پھر زُلفِ مسلسل کی شکن جاگ پڑی ہے 
پھر حُسن میں جادو کی کرن جاگ پڑی ہے 

معلوم نہیں پھول ہیں یا نقشِ کفِ پا
گُزرا ہے کوئی، راہِ چمن جاگ پڑی ہے 

اب دل کی نہیں خیر، نہ لے نام وفا کا 
پھر وہ نگہ وعدہ شکن جاگ پڑی ہے 

ساغر میں کوئی موج غنودہ نہ ملے گی 
شیشوں میں بھی صہبائے کہن جاگ پڑی ہے 

اِس دور کی تہذیب بھی اک نیند ہے گہری 
کروٹ نہیں بدلی تو تھکن جاگ پڑی ہے 

اس تیز ہوا میں جو گِرے ٹُوٹ کے کچھ پھول 
سوئی ہوئی ہر شاخِ چمن جاگ پڑی ہے 

جیسے کے تجلی ہو بہ عنوانِ حجابات 
ملبوس میں گلرنگئی تَن جاگ پڑی ہے 

محتاج نہیں باغ نسیمِ سحری کا 
اے جانِ چمن، روحِ چمن جاگ پڑی ہے 

ہے منتظر اُس دل کے دھڑکنے کا زمانہ 
جس دل میں محبت کی کرن جاگ پڑی ہے 

سب خاک نشیمن کو یونہی چُوم رہے ہیں 
یا غیرتِ اربابِ وطن جاگ پڑی ہے 

ہے قافلۂ شوق کی رفتار غنودہ 
منزل نہیں پائی تو تھکن جاگ پڑی ہے 

نشور واحدی[2]
