= Shamim Farooqui =

Indian poet

- Born: Syed Mohammad Shamim Ahmad; 25 December 1943; Bihar Sharif, Gaya
- Died: 29 August 2014 (aged 70)
- Occupation: Poet
- Known for: Urdu poetry

Shamim Farooqui (25 December 1943 – 29 August 2014) was an Urdu poet from India.

== Early life ==
He was from Bihar, India. He did his schooling from Gumla High School and did M.A. in Urdu from Ranchi University.

=== Published work ===
- Zaiqa Mere Lahoo Ka

== See also ==
- List of Indian poets
- List of Urdu language poets
