= Dilawar Figar =

Pakistani poet (1929–1998)

Dilawar Figar (Urdu: دلاور فگار)
- Born: Dilawar Hussain; 8 July 1929; Badayun, Uttar Pradesh, British India
- Died: January 25, 1998 (aged 68); Karachi, Sindh, Pakistan
- Occupation: Urdu poet
- Known for: humor and satire in his poetry
- Awards: Pride of Performance Award in 1999

Dilawar Figar (8 July 1929 – 25 January 1998) was a Pakistani humorist and poet. He was known as Shehansha-e-Zarafat (King of humor) and Akbar-e-Sani (Akbar the Second, after the late poet Akbar Allahabadi) for his satire and humour.

== Early life and career ==
Dilawar Figar was born as Dilawar Hussain on July 8, 1929 in Badaun, Uttar Pradesh, British India. He received his early education in his hometown, and later joined Agra University where he received his M.A. degree in (Urdu). He also did M.A. in (English) and M.A. in (Economics). He later became associated with the teaching profession.

He migrated to Pakistan from India in 1968 and settled in Karachi. He joined Abdullah Haroon College as a teacher, where the renowned poet Faiz Ahmed Faiz was the principal at that time. Figar taught Urdu literature there. He also worked for Karachi Development Authority as an Assistant Director-Town Planning.

== Death and legacy ==
Dilawar Figar died on 25 January 1998 in Karachi at age 68. During a literary gathering on 31 January 1993 at Karachi Arts Council, he himself once described his imaginary death and how he left for the heavens and was refused entry into paradise by the guard angels because he had arrived before his scheduled time. The guard angels asked him to come back after five years and sent him back to earth. The audience laughed it off at that time but he proved to be approximately right about his actual time of death – nearly 5 years later.

== Contribution to Urdu literature ==
Figar started writing in 1942 at the age of fourteen and soon got help of fellow writers, Maulvi Jam Nawai Badayuni, Maulana Jami Badayuni. His literary work contain Ghazals, humorous poems, and their translation in English:

- Mein Apna Vote Kis Ko Doon?- This witty poem became very popular during the 1970 General Elections in Pakistan
- Haadisay (collections of Ghazals)
- Sitam Zarifiañ (collections of humor poetry)
- Shamat-e-Aamaal (collections of humor poetry)
- Aadaab Arz (collections of humor poetry)
- Assar-e-Nau (collections of humor)
- Unglian Figar Apni (collections of humor poetry)
- Matla Arz Hai (collections of humor poetry)
- Century (collections of humor poetry)
- Khuda Jhoot Na Bulwa'ay (collections of humor poetry)
- Chiragh-e-Khandañ (collections of humor poetry)
- Aaina-e-Raghib (125 rubaiyat of Raghib Muradabadi)
- Khushbu Ka Safar (translation of selected English and American poetry)
- Khoob Tar Kahan (translation of 'Why Not the Best' – biography of President Jimmy Carter)
- Aabshar-e-Noor (poetic explanation of Sura Fatiha)
- Sila-e-Shaheed Kia Hai ? (poetic biography of recipients of Nishan-e-Haider martyrs)
- Fi Sabeel Lillah (collections of humor poetry)
- Kaha Suna Maaf Karna (collections of humor poetry)

== See also ==
- Urdu
- Progressive Writers' Movement
- List of Urdu writers
- List of Urdu poets
