= Kanwal Ziai =

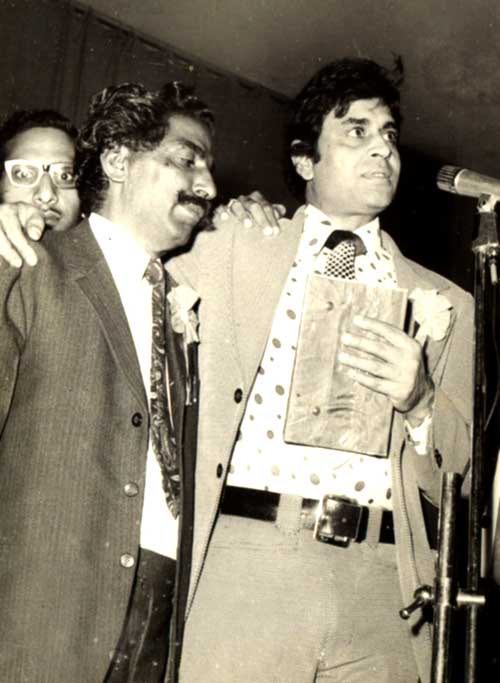
- Kanwal Ziai with his friend Rajendra Kumar at release of his book Pyase Jaam in 1973
- Born: Hardayal Singh Datta; 15 March 1927; Sialkot, Punjab, British India, (NowPakistan)
- Died: 27 October 2012 (aged 85); Dehradun, Uttarakhand, India
- Occupation: Poet
- Known for: Ghazals
- Website: Kanwal Ziai Website

Kanwal Ziai (born Hardayal Singh Datta) (15 March 1927 – 27 October 2011) was an Urdu and Hindi language poet and author from India.

== Early life ==
Ziai was born on 15 March 1927 in Kanjrur Dattan, Sialkot, (now Pakistan). He received award Doon Ratan from Nagrik Parishad. He obtained Urdu Fazil certificate. He retired from Defence Department. He was also president of the Bazm-e-Jigar. He died on 27 October 2011 in Dehradun, Uttarakhand, India.

== See also ==
- List of Indian poets
- List of Urdu language poets
- List of Urdu writers
- List of Urdu language writers

== Bibliography ==
- Pyase Jaam Urdu Poetry in Devnagri (Hindi) Language 1973
- Lafzo Ki Diwar in Urdu Language 1993
- Kagaz ka Dhua
- Dhoop ka Safar
