= Rishi Patialvi =

Rishi Patialvi (Urdu: رِشی پٹیالوی), (1917–1999), born Bam Dev Sharma, hailing from Hoshiarpur District (Punjab), was a popular Urdu poet belonging to Daagh Dehlvi’s lineage. He was a disciple of Naseem Noormahali who was a disciple of Labhu Ram Josh Malsiyani (1883-1976), a disciple of Mirza Khan Daagh Dehlvi. He died of a massive heart-attack on 26 December 1999 at Mumbai aged 82 years.

Five collections of his poems were published during the life-time of Rishi Patialvi, which are:-

- 1.Reg-e-Rawaan (1972) published by Biswin Sadi, New Delhi 184 pages
- 2.Phool Unki Mukaanon Ke (1978) published by Punjab Urdu Academy, Chandigarh 136 pages.
- 3.Roshni Kitni (1979) published by Rishi Publishing House, New Delhi 196 pages.
- 4.Chhir Gaii Jo Baat Unki (1980) –do- 152 pages
- 5.Shafaq Rang Aansoo (1981) published by Nao bahaar Saabir, Patiala 328 pages

His other works which are in Urdu prose include Riaz-e-Naseem (1978), Jaize (1966) and Partav-e-Jamhoor (1976).
