= Khalid Irfan =

American-Pakistani comic poet

Khalid Irfan خالد عرفان
- Born: Karachi, Pakistan
- Occupation: Poet
- Known for: Humorous and satirical Urdu poetry

Khalid Irfan (Urdu: خالد عرفان) is an American-Pakistani comic poet.

== Early life and career ==
Irfan was born in Karachi, Pakistan. His father, Irshad Ali, migrated to Pakistan from Badayun, India, in 1947. He received a master's degree in Urdu literature and has two sons. He resides in Queens, New York City.

Irfan has published five poetry collections. In several poems, he has described social and political issues of his native country Pakistan and his adopted country the United States. He is in charge of the literary section of Urdu Times Weekly, said to be the first and largest weekly Urdu newspaper in North America.

== See also ==
- List of Pakistani poets
- List of Urdu language poets
