= Kazim Jarwali =

Indian Urdu language poet (born 1955)

Kazim Jarwali کاظم جاروالی
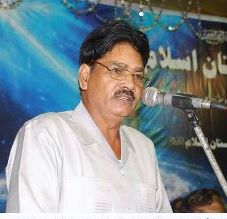
- Kazim Jarwali reciting in Mushaira
- Born: Jarwal, India
- Occupation: Poet

Kazim Jarwali (Urdu: کاظم جاروالی) (born 15 June 1955) is an Indian Urdu language poet. He is also known as "Shair-e-Fikr" and has written several collections of Urdu poetry, his notable works include Hussainistan, Kitab-e- Sang, Kooche aur Qandeelein and Karwaan-e-Gham.

== Biography ==
He settled in Lucknow and married to daughter of shia scholar of Lucknow Ayatullah Saeedul Millat Abqati, the lineage of abaqati family.

== Literary career ==
He is also known as "Shair-e-Fikr". He has written several collections of Urdu poetry and participated in several mushairas. He has received awards like U.P. Urdu Academy Award in 1994 for his literary work.

== See also ==
- List of Urdu language poets
