= Sarfraz Shahid =

Pakistani Urdu poet

- Born: 29 October 1938; Ghakhar Mandi, Gujranwala, Punjab, United India
- Died: 27 December 2021 (aged 83); Islamabad, Pakistan
- Occupations: Poet and author
- Known for: Humorous Urdu poetry
- Children: 3
- Awards: Pride of Performance Award in 2017

Sarfraz Shahid (1938 - 2021) was a Pakistani humorous Urdu poet and writer. He also served at the Pakistan Meteorological Department, Islamabad. He was honored with the Pride of Performance Award in 2017.

== Biography ==
Shahid was born on 29 October 1938, in Ghakhar Mandi, Gujranwala, Punjab, United India. He worked at the Pakistan Meteorological Department for 30 years and retired as director of the department.

As a humorous Urdu poet, Shahid participated in many Mushairas in the US, UK, Canada, Saudi Arabia, Thailand, Singapore, and Nepal. He authored more than 32 Books, including collections of humorous poetry.

He died on 27 December 2021 in Islamabad and was buried at the H-8 graveyard. He was survived by a widow and 3 sons.

== Books ==
=== Comic poetry ===
- Bila Takaluf
- Kuch To Kahiay
- Hera Phery
- Chokay
- Dish Antenna
- Gufta Shagufta
- Choukay Chakkay

=== Non-fiction ===
- Usool-e-Mousamiyat (Principals of Meteorology), published by National Language Promotion Department, Islamabad
- Istalahaat-e-Mousamiyat (Terminologies of Meteorology), published by National Language Promotion Department, Islamabad

== Awards and recognition ==
Year	Award	Category	Result	Presented by	Ref
2017	Pride of Performance Award	Arts	Won	President of Pakistan	
	Ameer Khusro Award	Poetry	Won	Amir Khusro Society London	
	Life Time Achievement Award	Poetry	Won	Punjab Council of Arts	
	Special Award for Scientific Poetry	Poetry	Won	Biotechnology Commission of Pakistan	
