= Jameela Nishat =

Indian poet

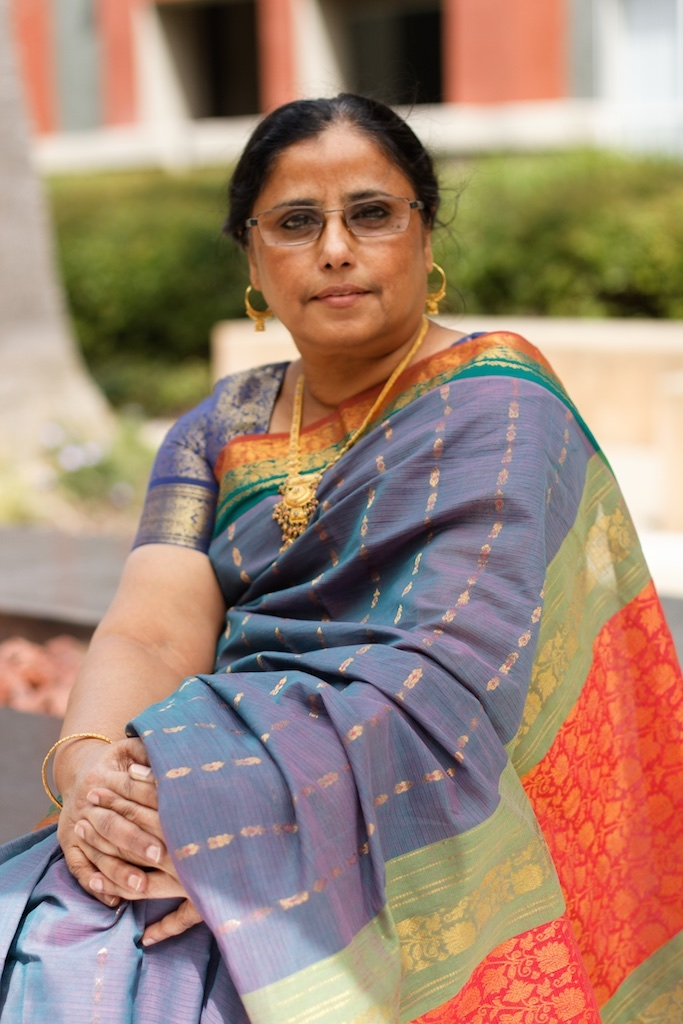
- Nishat at the Hyderabad Literary Festival
- Born: 1955 (age 70–71); Hyderabad, Telangana, India.
- Education: Master of Arts
- Occupations: Poet, Editor, Educationalist, Feminist
- Writing career
- Genres: Ghazal, Nazm,
- Subject: Literature

Jameela Nishat (born 1955) is an Urdu poet, editor, and feminist from Hyderabad, Telangana, India.

== Biography ==
Jameela Nishat was born in Hyderabad in a middle-class family. Her father, Syed Bin Mohammad, was a portrait artist. He was also a close friend of artist M F Hussain.

She wrote in Kitab Numa, a journal published by Jamia Millia University in Delhi and in other poetry magazines. Her first book, Lava, a collection of poems, was published in 2000. Hoshang Merchant translated some of her poems from Lava and the translated poems were published by Sahitya Academy in 2008. She has published three collections of poetry. Her work has also been featured in anthologies.

SPARROW published a booklet on her life and work in 1999. She is also one of the speakers at HLF - Hyderabad Literary Festival.

She was one of the feminist poets at 100 Thousand Poets for Change Conference held from 3 June to 8 June 2015 in Salerno, Italy.

In 2012, she founded the "Shaheen Collective - Shaheen's Women Resource and Welfare Association" to serve the cause of Muslim women. The organization works for the welfare of women and elimination of domestic and social violence.

== Works ==
- Butterfly Caresses (Published by Patridge India, 2015), Radio interview on the book.
- Lams Ki Sawghat (Educational Publishing House, New Delhi, 2006)
- Lamhey Ki Ankh (Published by Asmita Resource Centre for Women, Secunderabad, 2002)
- Lava (2000)
- Edited Inkeshaf, Anthology of Deccan Women Writers, Published by Asmita Resource Centre for Women, Secunderabad, 2000).

== Awards ==
- Maqdoom Award (1972)
- Devi Award by The New Indian Express (2015)
