= Rahat Indori =

Indian lyricist and poet (1950–2020)

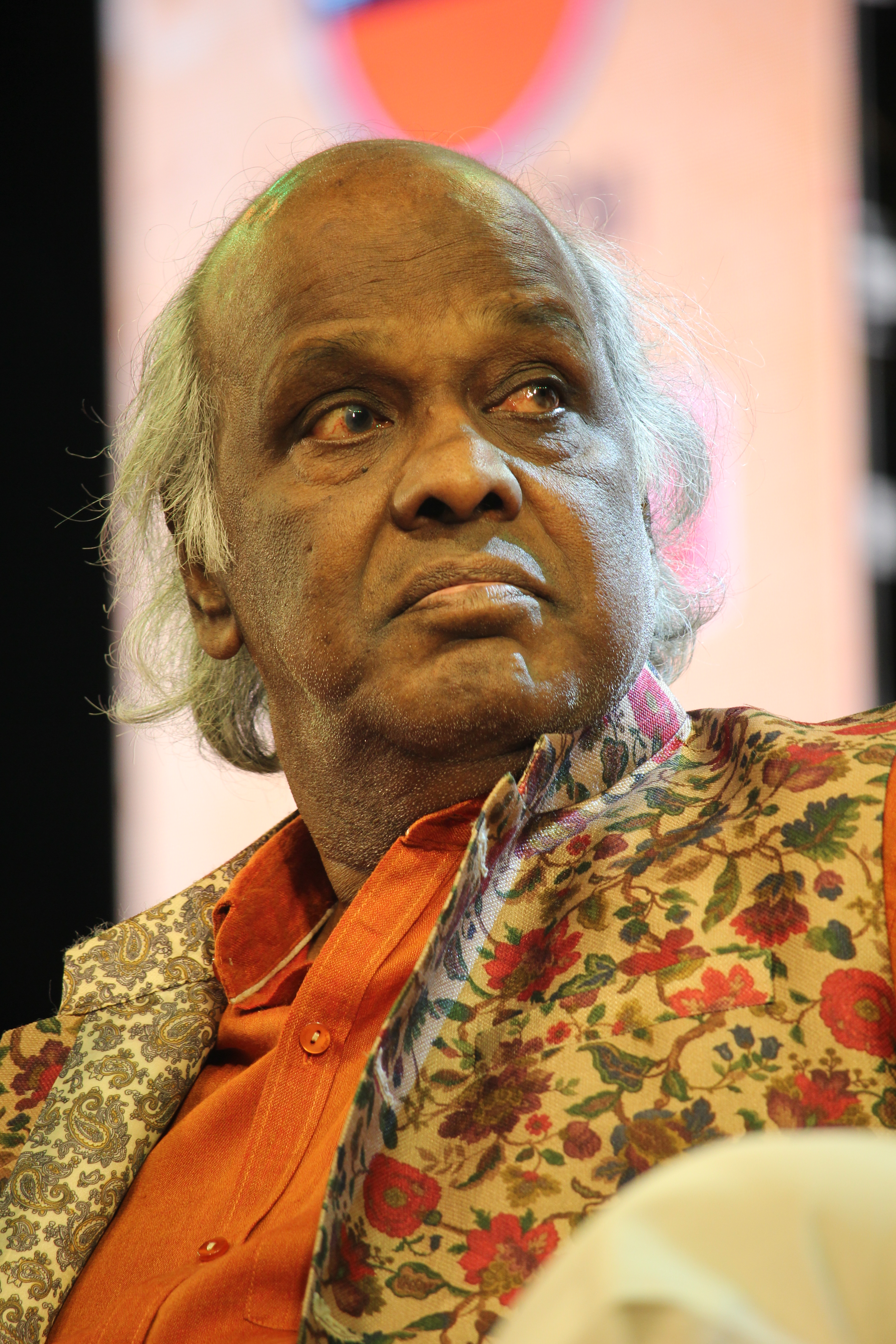
- Indori at Rajvadu, Ahmedabad, Gujrat on 22 February 2020
- Born: Rahat Quraishi; 1 January 1950; Indore, Madhya Bharat, India
- Died: 11 August 2020 (aged 70); Indore, Madhya Pradesh, India
- Citizenship: India
- Education: MA, PhD in Urdu literature
- Alma mater: Islamia Karimia College, Indore; Bhopal University, Bhopal
- Occupations: Lyricist; poet
- Spouse: Seema Rahat (m. 1977)
- Partner: Anjum Rehbar (separated)
- Children: 1
- Writing career
- Years active: 2020
- Genres: Ghazal, Nazm, Geet

Rahat Indori (born Rahat Qureshi; 1 January 1950 – 11 August 2020) was an Indian Bollywood lyricist and Urdu poet. He was also a former professor of Urdu language and a painter. Prior to this he was a pedagogist of Urdu literature at DAVV.

== Biography ==
Indori was born on 1 January 1950, in Indore to Rafatullah Qureshi (a cloth mill worker), and his wife Maqbool Un Nisa Begum. He was their fourth child. Rahat Indori did his schooling from Nutan School Indore from where he completed his Higher Secondary. He completed his graduation from Islamia Karimia College, Indore in 1973 and has passed his MA in Urdu literature from Bhopal University (known as Barkatullah University now) with a gold medal. (Bhopal, Madhya Pradesh) in 1975. Rahat was awarded a PhD in Urdu literature from the Bhoj University of Madhya Pradesh in 1985 for his thesis titled Urdu Main Mushaira.

Indori performed in Mushaira and Kavi Sammelan for 40 – 45 years. He travelled widely internationally to recite poetry. He attended poetic symposiums in almost all the districts of India and has travelled multiple times to the US, UK, Australia, Canada, Singapore, Mauritius, Saudi Arabia, UAE, Kuwait, Qatar, Bahrain, Oman, Pakistan, Bangladesh, Nepal etc.

== Media appearances ==
Indori was invited as a guest in The Kapil Sharma Show twice. First, on 1 July 2017 episode of Season 1 along with Kumar Vishwas and Shabinaji; and second time with Ashok Chakradhar on 21 July 2019 episode of Season 2. Indori was also invited in the show Wah! Wah! Kya Baat Hai! on SAB TV.

His couplet Bulati Hai Magar Jaane Ka Nahi became viral and started trending on Facebook, Twitter and Instagram during 2020 Valentines week. People started using this phrase as a meme. Another popular couplet, Kisi Ke Baap Ka Hindustan Thodi Hai, became viral on social media.

In 2016, a book on Rahat Indori 'Mere Baad' was released at the Oxford Bookstore in Connaught Place, Delhi. This book is a compilation of his Ghazals and Shayari.

On 1 January 2021, his 71st birthday, songdew.com unveiled a unique tribute titled Dr Rahat Indori - Ek Alag Pehchaan. As part of this unique tribute 9 famous artists of India and ( Indie musicians came together to compose 9 of the famous ghazals written by Dr Indori and create paintings inspired by his writing.

== Filmography ==
Year	Film	Song	Music	Singer
	Main Tera Aashiq	Mere Khayal	Parvez Akhtar	Anuradha Paudwal
	Aashiyan	Tuta Hua Dil Tere Hawaale	Parvez Akhtar	Anuradha Paudwal
	Aashiyan	Zindagi Naam Ko Humari Hai	Parvez Akhtar	Anuradha Paudwal
1993	Sir	Aaj Humne Dil Ka Har Kissa	Anu Malik	Kumar Sanu, Alka Yagnik
1993	Jaanam	Dil Jigar Ke Jaan Achchha Hai	Anu Malik	Amit Kumar
1994	Khuddar	Tumsa Koi Pyaara Koi Masoom	Anu Malik	Alka Yagnik, Kumar Sanu
1994	Khuddar	Hum apne gham ko	Anu Malik	Vinod Rathod, Sadhna Sargam
1994	Khuddar	Khat Likhna Humein Khat Likhna	Anu Malik	Alka Yagnik, Kumar Sanu
1994	Khuddar	Tum Mano Ya Na Mano	Anu Malik	Alka Yagnik, Kumar Sanu
1994	Khuddar	Raat Kya Maange Ek Sitaara	Anu Malik	Alka Yagnik
1994	Naraaz	Tere Bin Main Kuch Bhi Nahin	Anu Malik	Kumar Sanu & Udit Narayan
1995	Yaraana	Rabbi Re Ralli	Anu Malik	Udit Narayan, Kavita Krishnamurthy
1995	Yaraana	Loye Loye	Anu Malik	Kavita Krishnamurthy
1996	Ghatak	Koi jaye to le aye	Anu Malik	Alka Yagnik, Shankar Mahadevan
1996	Himalay Putra	"Ishq Hua Tujhse Janam":	Anu Malik	Alka Yagnik & Udit Narayan
1996	Himalay Putra	"Tune Kaisa Jadoo Kiya":	Anu Malik	Alka Yagnik& Udit Narayan
1997	Hameshaa	Hameshaa Hameshaa	Anu Malik	Kumar Sanu, Sadhana Sargam
1997	Hameshaa	Neela Dupatta	Anu Malik	Abhijeet, Sadhana Sargam
1997	Ishq	Dekho Dekho Jaanam Hum	Anu Malik	Alka Yagnik, Udit Narayan
1997	Ishq	Neend Churayee Meri	Anu Malik	Kumar Sanu, Alka Yagnik, Udit Narayan, Kavita Krishnamurthy
1998	Kareeb	Chori Chori Jab Nazrein Mili	Anu Malik	Kumar Sanu, Sanjeevani
2000	Mission Kashmir	Bumbro	Shankar–Ehsaan–Loy	Shankar Mahadevan, Sunidhi Chauhan, Jaspinder Narula
2000	Mission Kashmir	Dhuan Dhuan	Shankar–Ehsaan–Loy	Vinod Rathod, Anuradha Paudwal
2003	Munna Bhai M.B.B.S.	M Bole Toh (Munna Bhai MBBS)	Anu Malik	Vinod Rathod, Sanjay Dutt, Prachi and Priya Mayekar
2003	Munna Bhai M.B.B.S.	Chan Chan	Anu Malik	Vinod Rathod, Shreya Ghoshal
2003	Munna Bhai M.B.B.S.	Dekhle Aankhon Mein Aankhien Daal	Anu Malik	Sunidhi Chauhan, Anu Malik
2004	Murder	Dil Ko Hazaar Baar Roka	Anu Malik	Alisha Chinai
2004	Meenaxi	Yeh Rishta Kya Kehlata Hai	A. R. Rahman	Reena Bhardwaj
2017	Begum Jaan	Murshida	Anu Malik	Arijit Singh

== Works ==
Book	Ref.
Rut	
Do Kadam or Sahi	
Mere baad	
Dhoop Bahut Hai	
Chand Pagal Hai	
Maujood	
Naraz	

== Death ==
He tested positive for COVID-19 during the COVID-19 pandemic in India on 10 August 2020, and was admitted to Aurobindo Hospital in Indore, Madhya Pradesh. He died from cardiac arrest a day later on 11 August 2020.
