= Nusrat Zaidi =

Pakistani Urdu poet

- سید نصرت زیدی
- Born: Nusrat Zaidi; 1923; Memon, Uttar Pradesh, British India
- Died: March 2020; Pakistan
- Occupation: Poet
- Writing career
- Language: Urdu
- Years active: 19xx–2020
- Genre: Gazal
- Subject: Literature

Syed Nusrat Zaidi (1923 – March 2020) was a British Indian and later Pakistani poet who primarily wrote classical tradition poems in Urdu language. He also participated abroad in poetic concerts during his visits to Los Angeles, Iran, Canada, and Dubai.

== Biography ==
Nusrat was born in 1923 in British India, Uttar Pradesh at Memon village, and later in 1943 came to Pakistan where he lived in Lahore. He initially worked for a newspaper Partaab. After the partition of India took place, leading to the split of Indian subcontinent into two sovereign states he worked as a white-collar worker in Pakistan military accounts department at a low profile position "clerk" and continued until he retired or resigned. He was actively involved in literary events where he met Ehsan Danish and took part in different poetic symposiums with Habib Jalib. During his clerk career, he was transferred to several areas, including Peshawar and then Rawalpindi where he was introduced to Urdu poets such as Ahmad Faraz, Jamil Yusuf, Khatir Ghaznavi and Fariq Bukhari. An Urdu language magazine Humdam published one of his poems for a sovereign ruler of Swat who in return offered him PKR500 of that time.

== Personal life ==
Nusrat was born to his first mother. He had two sisters born to his second mother. He was married in 1963 to Mumtaz Fatima in Khairpur. His wife died in c. 2015. He had one daughter Najamus Sadaf Zaidi.

== Literary career ==
Nusrat started his poetry during his childhood at fifteen. He was influenced by Mustafa Zaidi and Ehsan Danish. From 1945 to 1946, he worked for Daily Pratab and used to write articles for the newspaper, and subsequently the director of information Pakistan offered him a job for writing four articles monthly at RKR25 each. After the country came under military dictatorship, he was detained for refusing to write an article against an editor. He actively wrote poetic books, including Tabsara-o-Tajziya which earned an award in Canada. His publications and books include Azarkada (1959), Kuliyat-e-Mustafa Zaidi, Hurf-e-Qudz, Intikhab-e-Kalam-e-Mustafa Zaidi (2009), Yad Kare Gi Duniya (2017), and Harf-o-Sada (2011).
