= Jigar Moradabadi =

20th century Indian Urdu poet

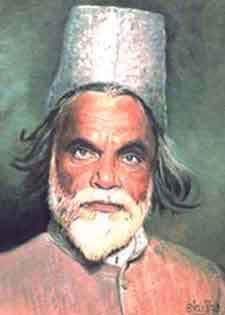
- Born: Sikander Ali; 6 April 1890; Moradabad, British India (present-day Uttar Pradesh, India)
- Died: 9 September 1960 (aged 70); Gonda, Uttar Pradesh, India
- Occupation: Poet
- Known for: Classical Urdu Poetry; Ghazal
- Notable work: Dagh-e-Jigar(1928); Shola-e-Tuur (1932); Aatish-e-Gul (1954); Diwan-e-Jigar
- Father: Syed Ali Nazar
- Awards: Sahitya Akademi Award (1958)

Ali Sikandar (6 April 1890 – 9 September 1960), known by his pen name as Jigar Moradabadi, was an Indian Urdu poet and ghazal writer. He received the Sahitya Akademi Award in 1958 for his poetry collection "Atish-e-Gul", and was the second poet (after Mohammad Iqbal) to be awarded an honorary D.Litt. by the Aligarh Muslim University.

== Biography ==
He received oriental education in Arabic, Persian and Urdu in Moradabad, and started to work as a travelling salesman.

Jigar moved to Gonda, near Lucknow, where he befriended Asghar Gondvi.

He died on 9 September 1960 in Gonda.

== Legacy ==
His Sufi poem Yeh Hai Maikada was sung by many Sufi singers like the Sabri Brothers, Aziz Mian, Munni Begum and Attaullah Khan Esakhelvi.

== Acclaim ==
Jigar Moradabadi belonged to the classical school of ghazal writing and was a mentor to Majrooh Sultanpuri, who became a prominent lyricist in the Indian film industry and penned many popular songs in Urdu.

Jigar was only the second poet in the history of Aligarh Muslim University to be awarded an honorary D.Litt., the first was Muhammad Iqbal.

Faiz Ahmad Faiz, the distinguished Urdu poet and academic, regarded Jigar Moradabadi as a master craftsman in his field.

== Jigar Fest - 2018 ==
Progressive Foundation organized three days Jigar Fest at Moradabad in 2018, to celebrate Jigar's birthday.

Day 1 - Mushayra by Rahat Indori, Wasim Barelvi etc.
Day 2 - Qawwali Night by Chand Qadri
Day 3 - Musical Night by Sheeba Alam

== See also ==
- List of Urdu-language writers
