= Brij Mohan Dattatreya Kaifi =

Indian writer

- برجموہن دتاتریہ کیفی
- Born: 13 December 1866; Delhi, British Raj
- Died: 1 October 1955 (aged 88); Ghaziabad, India
- Occupations: Writer, poet, playwright, novelist and essayist
- Writing career
- Pen name: Kaifi
- Language: Urdu

Pandit Brij Mohan Dattatreya Kaifi Dehlavi (13 December 1866 – 1 November 1955) was an Indian Urdu language writer, poet, playwright, novelist and essayist.

== Biography ==
Brij Mohan Dattatreya Kaifi was born on 13 December 1866 in Delhi. He was a student of Altaf Hussain Hali in poetry. He was also well up in Hindi, Arabic, Persian, and English. He lived in Lahore for many years, where his son was an editor of The Tribune. Kaifi proved to be a great asset for Anjuman-i Taraqqi-i Urdu after Abdul Haq. He died on 1 November 1955 in Ghaziabad.
