= Munavvar Lakhnavi =

Indian poet and translator (1897–1970)

Munawwar Lakhnavi
- Born: Bisheshwar Prasad; 8 July 1897; Lucknow, India
- Died: 25 May 1970 (aged 72); Delhi, India
- Occupation: Government Service – Railways Accounts Office
- Known for: Nazms, Ghazals, Rubais and translations

Munawwar Lakhnavi (Note: Urdu: منور لکھنوی) (8 July 1897 – 25 May 1970) was an Indian Urdu poet who gained repute as a poet and also as a translator.

== Biography ==
Munavvar was the takhallus of Bisheshwar Prasad who was born in Lucknow in 1897 in a family of Urdu, Sanskrit and Persian litterateurs. His father, Dwarkaprasad Ufuq (1864–1913) was a prolific writer of prose and poetry. He was educated in Lucknow and joined Railway Accounts office in 1913 at Lucknow. He was transferred to Lahore in 1927 and then to Delhi where he retired from service in 1957. After retirement, he decided to stay in Delhi where he purchased a house and founded a publishing house – Adarsh Kitab Ghar. He died in Delhi in the year 1970 aged 73 years.

== Literary life ==
Munavvar Lakhnavi was an Urdu Poet, and a translator, belonging to the old school. He wrote ghazals and nazmss. He gained renown as a translator with the publication in 1936 of a translation of Bhagvad Gita in Urdu verse titled- Naseem e Irfaan. In 1952 his translation of Kalidasa's Kumarasambhava and in 1956 his translation of Durga Saptshati i.e. Devi Mahatmya, both in Urdu verse, were published. He had also translated important Āyahs of Quran, select Persian sh’ers of Hafez Sherazi, and Gitanjali of Rabindra Nath Tagore. His translation of the teachings of Gautam Buddha in Urdu verse titled Dhampad ya sachi raah published by the Anjuman e Tarraqi (Hind), Aligarh in 1954 is considered a masterpiece. Earlier his two collections of rubais and nazms, Nazre Adab published in 1929 and Kainat e dil that was published in 1939 had already established him as a poet of note so much so that a selection of his poems was prominently included in the book titled Teen Shair published by Likhaani Book Depot, Amritsar, and in the April 1952 issue of Urdu Monthly "Seemab", Delhi.

An appraisal of his life and literary works titled Munavvar Lakhnavi – ek mutala’ah by Shabab Lalit was published in 1996 by Modern Publishing House, New Delhi. Yet another appraisal titled Munavvar Lakhnavi – Shakhsiyat aur Shairi by Raj Narain Raaz was published by Nusrat Publishers, Lucknow.

== Bibliography ==
Urdu Poetry:

- Nazre adab
- Kainat e dil
- Nawa e kufr
- Ada e kufr
