= Sultana Meher =

- Born: Fatima; 6 April 1938 (age 88); Bombay, British India
- Occupations: Writer, Journalist, Tazkara Nigaar, Poet
- Writing career
- Genres: fiction, poetry
- Subjects: Love, Biographical Memoir

Sultana Meher (Fatima Hashim Daulah, b. 6 April 1938) is a memoir writer (Tazkara Nigaar) from Pakistan. She is a poet, short story writer, novelist and journalist.

== Early life ==
Sultana Meher was born in Mumbai, India on 6 April 1938. She is the eldest daughter of Muhammad Hashim Daulah and Khadeja Hashim. Her father died when she was 13, forcing her to stop her education. She was fond of books and started writing stories in newspapers. She married poet and journalist Saeed Raza Saeed. After the birth of her first son Sohail Saeed she moved to Pakistan along with her family.

After the birth of her two children Sultana Meher decided to complete her education. She started high school and afterwards attended Karachi University, where she earned her Masters in Journalism in 1971. She studied while working as a journalist and looking after her family. Sultana Meher went to the US in 1991 to join her sons. There she continued her literary activities. The Urdu Writer Society of North America recognized her efforts in Urdu literature. Meher met Jawed Akhtar Choudhry and remarried in September 2002. She lives in Birmingham, United Kingdom.

== Career ==
Meher started her career with The Daily Hindustan, Bombay, then became an editor of the Ladies section in the newspaper The Daily ANJAAM, Karachi, Pakistan. She joined Daily JANG, Karachi and worked there from 1967 to 1979 as a Journalist. She published her own Monthly Magazine ‘The Roop, from 1980 to 1991.

== Publications ==
Sultana Meher has written more than 20 books and hundreds of articles.

=== Novels ===
- Dagh e Dil 1962
- Tajwar 1966
- Ik Kiran Ujalay Ki 1969
- Jab Basant Rut Aai 1972

=== Story collections ===
- Band Seepian 1967
- Dhoop aur Saiban 1980
- Dil Ki Abrooraezi

=== Poetry ===
- Harf e Mohtaber ( Majmooa e Kalam) 1996

=== Criticism, compilations and anthologies ===
- Aaj Ki Shairaat 1974
- Iqbal Daure Jadeed Ki Awaaz 1977
- Sahir Ka Fun aur Shakhsiat 1989
- Sukhanwar (Tazkara e Shura e Pakistan)1979
- Sukhanwar Vol 1: 1978,1989 & 2000
- Sukhanwar Vol 2: 1996
- Sukhanwar Vol 3: 1998
- Sukhanwar Vol 4: 2000
- Sukhanwar Vol5: 2004
- Guftanee Vol 1:( Nasar NgarooN ka Tazkara) 2000
- Guftanee Vol 2: (Nasar NagarooN ka Tazkara) 2004
