= Nazish Pratapgarhi =

- Born: Mohammad Ahmad; 12 July 1924; Pratapgarh, United Provinces, British India
- Died: 10 April 1984 (aged 59); Lucknow, Uttar Pradesh, India
- Other name: Mohmmad Ahmed
- Occupation: Poet
- Known for: Well known by his words And also written for Independence at time of 1947

Nazish Pratapgarhi was an Urdu poet from India, He was honoured with the "Meer and Ghalib" award by the President Of India .who was known for his thoughts and ability to create contact between himself and lovers of Urdu poetry. And famous for Patriotic Poetry for Nation .

He Is Awarded by "Meer And Ghalib" award by the President of India

He is promoting "GANGA JAMUNA TAHZEEB"

== Early life ==
Pratapgarhi hailed from Pratapgarh, Uttar Pradesh, India.

== Writings ==
He mainly wrote Urdu Ghazals. He was a disciple of Seemab Akbarabadi. His collection of ghazals titled Naya Saaz Naya Andaz was published by the Uttar Pradesh Urdu academy. In 1983, he received the Ghalib Award in recognition of his contribution to Urdu literature.

He faced financial difficulties throughout his life and even when he approached the film industry, he did not sell his lyrics, although he led a poor life.

== See also ==
- List of Indian poets
- List of Urdu language poets
