= Mashafi =

Indian Urdu poet (1751–1844)

Mushafi
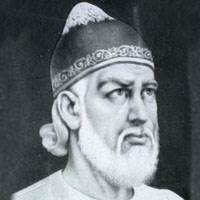
- Born: Ghulam Ali Hamdani; 1751; Amroha, Mughal Empire (present-day India)
- Died: 1844 (aged 93); Lucknow
- Occupation: Urdu poet
- Writing career
- Period: Mughal era
- Genre: Ghazal
- Subjects: Love, philosophy

Ghulam Ali Hamdani (Note: Urdu: غلام علی ہمدانی, romanized: Ghulām ʿAlī Hamdānī) (1751–1844), commonly known by the takhallus Mushafi, (Note: Urdu: مصحفی, romanized: Maṣḥafī) was an Urdu ghazal poet.

== Works ==
Before his time, the language known as Hindi, Hindavi, Dehlavi, Dakhini, Lahori or Rekhta was commonly known as the Zaban-i-Ordu, and commonly in local literature and speech, Lashkari Zaban or Lashkari. Mushafi was the first person to simply shorten the later name to Urdu. He migrated to Lucknow during the reign of Asaf-ud-Daula. According to one source, his ghazals are full of pathos.

He wrote Tazkira E Hindi in Persian language which demonstrates his skill in that tongue. He also wrote in Hindavi:

مصحفی فارسی کو طاق پہ رکھ

اب ہے اشعار ہندوی کا رواج

Mashafi farsi ko taq pe rakh

Ab hai ashaar- e-Hindavi ka rivaj

Mashafi, put Persian on the shelf

Now the Hindavi poetry is in the trend

There are ten extant collections of his poems, but it is believed that he allowed others for a fee to publish his poems under their own authorship. He excelled in lyrics but also composed odes and romances.

== See also ==
- List of Urdu poets
- Rekhta
- Ghazal
- Masud Sa'd Salman
