= Harichand Akhtar =

Indian journalist and poet

Harichand Akhtar ہری چند اختر
- Born: Harichand; 15 April 1901; Hoshiarpur, Punjab, British India
- Died: 1 February 1958 (aged 56); Delhi, India
- Occupation: Journalist
- Known for: Urdu poetry

Pandit Harichand Akhtar (15 April 1901 – 1 January 1958) ( Urdu:ہری چند اختر ) was a well-known journalist who was also a renowned Urdu Ghazal poet. He was born in Hoshiarpur, Punjab in a Brahmin family (Kaushal), on 15 April 1901. He was fluent in the use of Urdu, Persian and English languages. Having passed the Munshi Fazil Examination soon after Matriculation, he obtained M.A. (English) degree from the Punjab University, Lahore. He spent a greater part of his life in Lahore writing for Paras, Lahore, the Newspaper that was then owned and edited by Lala Karam Chand; he was also employed in the office of the Punjab Legislative Assembly. After the formation of Pakistan he moved to Delhi where he died on 1 January 1958.

Harichand Akhtar was a poet whose focus genre was ghazal. He was a conventionalist but his manner was unique for simplicity. His collection of ghazals titled Kufr o Imaan was published during his lifetime.
