= Jagan Nath Azad =

Indian Urdu poet, writer and academician (1918–2004)

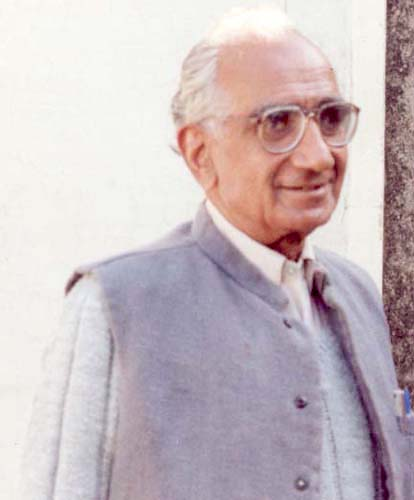
- Born: Jagan Nath Azad; 5 December 1918; Isa Khel in Mianwali District, Punjab, British India (Present-day Pakistan)
- Died: 24 July 2004 (aged 85); New Delhi, India
- Occupations: Poet; Writer; Academician
- Spouses: Shukantla (m. 1940; div. 1946); Vimmla (m. 1948)
- Children: Mukta and Permila (From first wife Shukantla); Aadarsh, Chandar Kant and Ponam (From second wife Vimmla)
- Website: http://jagannathazad.info

Jagan Nath Azad (5 December 1918 – 24 July 2004), was an Indian Urdu poet, writer and academician. He wrote over 70 books, including poetry collections, poems, biographies, and travelogues.

He was a well known author on the life, philosophy and works of Muhammad Iqbal. He served as President of the Iqbal Memorial Trust for a term of five years (1981–85).

Azad was elected vice-president of Anjuman-i Taraqqi-i Urdu (Hind) (a national body for the promotion of Urdu under the Ministry of Human Resource Development), in 1989 and President in 1993, remaining in this office till his demise.

He was at his writing desk until fifteen days before he died – of carcinoma and a brief illness – at the Rajiv Gandhi Cancer Institute and Research Centre in New Delhi, India on 24 July 2004. He was 84 and is survived by his wife and five children.

== Biography ==
Azad was born on 5 December 1920 in the small town of Isa Khel in Mianwali District, Punjab. The district became part of Pakistan after the partition of India in 1947. He inherited his love of Urdu literature from his father, Tilok Chand Mehroom – was the close companion of Syed Hashim Raza, Syed Moeenuddin Jafri-ul-Chishti, Shabeer Hassan Khan (known as Josh Malihabadi) himself a poet of renown – who introduced him to Urdu poetry via Diwan-e-Ghalib and took him to mushairas in which he participated. The first such event resulted in the young Azad meeting Hafeez Jalandhari for the first time and being presented with a copy of Hindustan Hamara, which he read, cherished and re-read over the years.

=== Education ===
After passing his matriculation examination from Raja Ram Mohan Rai High School (Mianwali) in 1933, he joined Dayanand Anglo-Vedic (DAV) College (Rawalpindi), obtained an FA degree in 1934 and moved on to Gordon College (Rawalpindi), achieving an MA degree in 1937. He returned to education after a period of employment and attained MA (Farsi) in 1944 and MoL in 1945 from University of the Punjab (Lahore). Shabnam Roomani, Syed Fakhruddin Balley Alig, Ahmad Nadeem Qasmi, Wazeer Agha and Waheed Qureshi were his closest friends and companions in Pakistan. During his visit to Pakistan, so many times he stayed at Balley House. Achieving 1st position in the college, he was awarded a set of Rabindra Nath Tagore's books.

== Career ==
=== As Journalist ===
Azad's introduction to journalism came at an early age when, during his college days, he served as Editor of the Gordonian – the College newspaper. His first formal posting was as Editor of the Urdu monthly Adabi Dunya, published in Lahore. On moving to Delhi after the partition of India, Azad secured the post of Assistant Editor of the Urdu daily, Milap.

=== As Government servant ===
In 1948, Azad joined the Government of India's Ministry of Labour as Editor of Employment News. A few months later, he applied for, and secured one of the three posts of Assistant Editor (Urdu) with the Ministry of Information and Broadcasting's Publications Division. He was promoted to Information Officer (Urdu) in 1955. Subsequently, he served as IO (U) in the Ministry of Food and Agriculture; the Ministry of Tourism Shipping and Transport, and the Ministry of Works and Housing with a brief return to the Ministry of I and B (1964–65) and as the first Public Relations Officer in the Ministry of Home Affairs for the newly created Border Security Force. On promotion to Deputy Principal Information Officer, he joined the Government of India's Press Information Bureau and served in both the New Delhi and Srinagar offices.

He remained in Srinagar on promotion to Director of Public Relations in 1973 and retired from the PIB and the Government Service in 1977.

=== As academic ===
On retirement from the Government Service in 1977, Azad accepted University of Jammu's offer of Headship of the Department of Urdu and the post of Professor at the University in Jammu. This posting provided him the atmosphere and the opportunity to spread his literary and academic wings. It is here that he produced the translation of Allama Iqbal's Javed Nama and undertook the massive task of writing Allama's biography (Roodad-e-Iqbal) in five volumes. Roodad-e-Iqbal, Volume I was compiled and published by Amin Banjara, a well-known writer, critic, research scholar and a close associate of Azad in 2005 and released by Begum Vimla Azad. Roodad-e-Iqbal, Volume II (646 pages), completed shortly before his death, is also compiled by Amin Banjara in book form and ready for publication. Amin Banjara is also working on Azad's Interviews and his letters. Unfortunately, research material and manuscripts of volumes III – V of Roodad-e-Iqbal were destroyed in the flood of 1988. Azad found it impossible to reconstruct the lost manuscripts. The University honoured him with the award of Deanship of the Faculty of Oriental Learning in 1980 and Emeritus Fellowship in 1984. It also facilitated his literary work with the provision of accommodation and staff till his demise.

The DLit degrees awarded by the Universities of Jammu and Kashmir to him and the 10+ books and numerous research articles written about him are testimony to Azad's impact on the literary circles of both India and Pakistan.

== Reviews and tributes ==
Tara Charan Rastogi, the noted Iqbal scholar, says:

"In the context of his writings on Iqbal and connected topics, Azad stands out as a critic with encyclopedic erudition; he is Iqbal Academy incarnate; and, he is the first man who ventured to rehabilitate Iqbal and Urdu Literature in post-partition India."

Azad's book "Iqbal: Mind and Art" received glowing reviews and was accorded an effusive welcome in the world of academia. Azad Gulati, himself a professor and an award-winning Urdu poet, echoed these sentiments when he reviewed the book in the April 1985 issue of the Iqbal Review published by the Iqbal Academy in Lahore, Pakistan. Two short extracts from his review epitomise the plaudits showered on Jagan Nath Azad whenever Allama Iqbal is discussed in academic or literary circles:

"Prof. Jagan Nath Azad, who has earned for himself an authoritative niche in Iqbaliat, encompasses in this book the quartet of poetry, politics, philosophy and religion that forms the matrix of Iqbal’s creative genius."

"The appendices include stray notes on Iqbal, Prof. Azad’s letters to newspapers and journals about controversial facets of Iqbal’s evaluation, his reviews of books about Iqbal and his preface to Anand Narain Mulla's translation of Iqbal's "Lala-i-Tur". Prefaced by Dr. Mohammad Maruf's balanced and perceptive analysis of Prof. Azad's views and copiously studded with illustrative extracts from Iqbal's works and their meticulous translations, this valuable compendium on Iqbaliat provides smooth, racy reading."

The writer and critic Ashfaque Naqvi summed up Azad's monumental contribution to the study of Iqbal in his article A word about Jagan Nath Azad which appeared in Pakistan's leading English language daily newspaper Dawn on 27 June 2004, four weeks before Azad died. Naqvi wrote:

"The books authored by Jagan Nath Azad include some on literary criticism while about eleven, both in English and Urdu, are on Iqbal. Soon after partition, Iqbal was almost banned in India. It was only through the efforts of Jagan Nath Azad that Iqbal is as highly respected there today as Amir Khusrow, Meeraji or Ghalib. Even in Pakistan, it was Jagan Nath Azad's whisper into the ears of Gen Zia ul Haq that led to the establishment of the Iqbal Chair in the Punjab University."

== Travelogues ==
Whilst there was no tradition among established Urdu writers to publish travelogues, Azad was the first to write several detailed and absorbing accounts of his travels, in his own distinctive style, which caught the eye of Urdu lovers in general and Urdu-reading seasoned travellers in particular.

Azad was in the USSR, at a time when very few independent travellers found their way there. Upon his return home, he published "Pushkin Ke Des Mein" (In the Land of Pushkin ). Likewise, an extended trip to the USA resulted in "Columbus Ke Des Mein" (In the Land of Columbus). His other travelogues cover Canada, Europe, Britain, Pakistan and India.

Since Azad died, no Urdu writer of note has produced so many and such varied travelogues. However, the Indian National Council for Promotion of Urdu recognises the importance of such publications (safarnama) and now supports research in this field, to encourage writers aspiring to follow in the footsteps of Azad.

== Building bridges ==
India and Pakistan: The single event that affected Azad more than any other was the partition of India. Before the partition, he worked as personal assistant to the Secretary, Communal Harmony Movement (Lahore) for a time and, when Sir Sikander Hayaat Khan (Unionist Muslim League) published a newsletter, Azad (a Hindu) travelled around Punjab spreading the word of the League. After the partition he always wished Pakistan well and firmly believed that "political divisions cannot divide the Indian poets from their love of Pakistan, nor the Pakistani poets from their love for India".

Azad was a passionate advocate of close friendship and bonding between the people of India and Pakistan.

Kashmir: During his 10-year tenure of Srinagar (Kashmir) as representative of the Government of India, Azad forged and cemented strong links with every shade of opinion in Kashmir ranging from Mirwaiz Molvi Mohammad Umar Farooq (Kashmiri religious and political leader) to Sheikh Mohammad Abdullah (Prime Minister of Kashmir). Kashmiris recognised Azad as an unbiased intellectual who was imbibed only with the spirit of humanity, not as ‘an agent of the Government’.

It is not a co-incidence that Kashmir witnessed a golden era of peace and progress in the 1970s and 80s – the time of Azad’s efforts in building bridges in the State.

He received the National Unity Award 2001–02 from Himotkarsh, Sahitya, Sabskriti aivam Jan Kalayan Parishad of Kashmir.

== Awards and honours ==
During his life Azad was the honoured recipient of numerous awards for his contribution to Urdu literature and work on Allama Iqbal. Both the Governments of India and Pakistan (central and regional) presented him with trophies and citations. The Government of Pakistan awarded him the President of Pakistan's Gold Medal for his services to Urdu literature, and the Government of India presented him with the Award for Services in the Cause of Strengthening Indo-Soviet Cultural Relations. Azad received the Minar-e-Pakistan from the Chief Minister of West Punjab (Pakistan) and Shiromani Sahityakar and Robe of Honour from the Government of East Punjab (India).

Local, national, and international literary organisations including the Ghalib Institute, Ghalib Memorial Society, All India Meer Academy, Iqbal International Congress, Iqbal Memorial Trust, The Urdu Society of Canada, The Houston (Texas) Literary Society, The World Urdu Conference, various universities (including the University of Peking (China) bestowed him with honours. He was presented with awards for his literary works, invited to preside over their functions, launch their publications, and present awards to winners of their awards.

Most famous writer, poet and Journalist Syed Fakhruddin Balley was Founder Chief_Editor and Syed Zafar Moeen Balley as Editor of "Aawaz E Jarras Lahore" (literary magazine) Mr S.F.Balley Alig published "Jagan Nath Aazad Number" of "Aawaz E Jarras Lahore" and Gosha E Jagan Nath Azad in "Aawaz E Jarras Lahore" Unikarians International (UAE Chapter) organised Jashn-e-Azad in Abu Dhabi in 1993 and Halqa-e-Fun-o-Adab (USA) convened Jashn-e-Azad in 1998. The Jammu and Kashmir Urdu Forum recognised him as “Abroo-e-Adab” in 1997.

== See also ==
- Urdu poetry
- Qaumi Tarana
- Indian poetry
