= Aasi Ghazipuri =

Indian poet

Shah Muhammad Abdul Aleem Aasi Ghazipuri
- آسی غازی پوری
- Born: Abdul Aleem; 21 December 1834; Sikandarpur, Ballia district, United Provinces (now Uttar Pradesh)
- Died: 24 January 1917 (aged 82); Ghazipur, United Provinces

Shah Muhammad Abdul Aleem Aasi (21 December 1834 – 24 January 1917) better known as Aasi Ghazipuri was an Indian Sufi mystic and Poet of Urdu-language. He was a contemporary of Altaf Hussain Hali, Hafeez Jalandhari and Zafar Ali Khan. He was the teacher of Fani Ghazipuri, a known poet of Urdu-language and was one of poet who was praised by Firaq Gorakhpuri and Majnun Gorakhpuri.

== Early life and education ==
Muhammad Abdul Aleem Aasi was born on 21 December 1834 at Sikandarpur, Ballia district, United Provinces (now Uttar Pradesh) into a well-educated family. He was a student of Nasikh school.

He received his early education under the tutelage of his maternal grandfather and then he went to Jaunpur and studied under Maulana Abdul Haleem Firangi Mahali.

== Works ==
- Ghazipuri, Aasi (1983). Abdali, Dr. Taiyab (ed.). Intikhab-e-Kalam-e-Aasi Ghazipuri (in Urdu) (1st ed.). Lucknow: Uttar Pradesh Urdu Academy.

== Death ==
He died on 24 January 1917 at Ghazipur, United Provinces.
