= Josh Malsiyani =

Indian Urdu poet (1883–1976)

Portait of Labhu Ram Josh Malsiyani

Labhu Ram (1883-1976), better known by his pen name Josh Malsiyani, was an Indian Urdu poet who much acclaimed during his time.

== Biography ==
He was born in a poor family in the Aquilpur locality of Malsian, a small town near Jalandhar which town was the domain of Bedi family till Sir Kalim Singh Bedi’s migration to Rawalpindi in the 19th century. Josh’s father, who mostly lived in Peshawar, was an illiterate small-trader. After being trained as a teacher in Lahore Josh started teaching Urdu and Persian in a school in Jalandhar but in 1913 settled permanently in Nakodar where he spent the rest of his life as a school-teacher and guiding budding Urdu poets.

He had himself started writing Urdu poems when he was eight years old and later on became a disciple of Mirza Khan Daagh Dehlvi. Ratan Pandoravi, Sahir Hoshiarpuri and Naresh Kumar Shad were his pupils. He is known for his book - Sharh- e – Diwaan – Ghalib, which is a scholarly commentary on Ghalib’s Urdu poetry.

Malik Ram’s assessment of Josh Malsiyani’s poetry and contribution finds place amongst fifty-two poets whose lives and works have been discussed in his monumental work - Tazkirah e muasireen, Vol.4. Josh Malsiyani was a recipient of Padma Shri Award. His son Arsh Malsiani was also an Urdu poet.
