= Rajinder Manchanda Bani =

Indian poet

- Born: Multan
- Died: 11 October 1981 (aged 49); Delhi
- Occupation: School-teacher
- Known for: Poetry
- Notable work: Harf e Moetbar, Hisab e Rang, Shafaq e Shajjar

Rajinder Manchanda Bani (1932–1981) was an Indian poet. He was born at Multan in 1932. His family migrated to Delhi in 1947 where he died in 1981. He was a Master of Arts in Economics from Punjab University, and a school- teacher. Harf e Moetbar (1972), Hisab e Rang (1976) & Shafaq e Shajjar are his three collections of poems. He was a poet of neo-classical ghazal who did not use conventional imagery and was original in style; he was an effective user of Hindi diction. He was a physically weak person who did not maintain good health throughout his life-time but possessed a sturdy mind; he lived for 49 years.
