= Natiq Gulaothi =

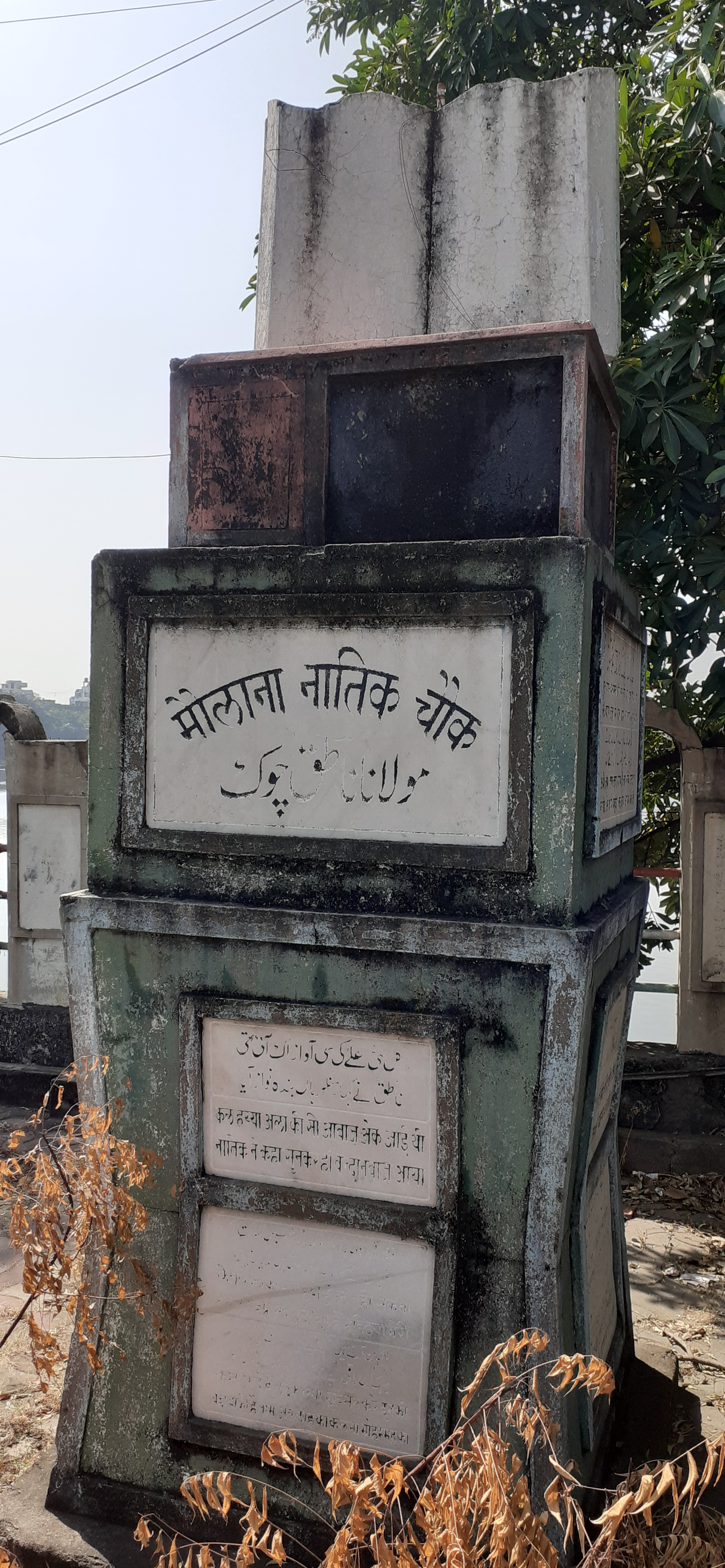
Memorial of Maulana Natia Gulaothi at Nagpur

Maulana Syed Abul Hasan Natiq (Urdu: ناطق گلاؤٹھوی; 11 November 1886 – 27 May 1969) was an Urdu poet and disciple of Daagh Dehlvi. Besides being a poet, he also participated in the Indian freedom movement and was also elected as a member of the provincial assembly of the Central Provinces in 1926. He was a member of Nagpur municipality for more than two decades.

His family, originally from Gulaothi in the United Provinces, moved to Nagpur district in the aftermath of the mutiny of 1857. He was born on 11 November 1886, at Kamptee. In his childhood, he was sent to Gulaothi where he had his early education.

He died on 27 May 1969. He was buried at Mominpura graveyard in Nagpur.
