= Sahir Lakhnavi =

Pakistani poet (1931–2019)

- Syed Qaim Mehdi Naqvi a.k.a. Sahir Lakhnavi
- Born: Syed Qaim Mehdi Naqvi; 6 September 1931; Karachi, Pakistan
- Died: 25 November 2019 (aged 88); Karachi, Pakistan
- Resting place: Wadi-e-Hussain
- Education: MA, LL.B.
- Alma mater: Government Dayal Singh College
- Occupation: Poet
- Partner: Nawab Syed Akhtar Hussain Masood Lakhnavi
- Children: 5
- Relatives: Fazil Lakhnavi (grandfather)
- Writing career
- Pen name: Sahir Lakhnavi
- Language: Urdu, Persian
- Genres: Marsiya; Qasida; Gazal; Nazm
- Subjects: Linguistics; Prosody; Seerat; History; Theology; Tafsir

Sahir Lakhnavi (born Syed Qaim Mehdi Naqvi; 6 September 1931 – 25 November 2019) was a Pakistani classical Urdu poet and the 20th century's last marsiya writer of Pakistan. He wrote gazals, nazms, qataat-i-tareekh, particularly marsiya and qasida throughout his literary career. He wrote twenty books on multiple subjects, including linguistics, poetry, prosody, seerat, history, theology and tafseer. He also appears to have written to the Persian literature, but his primary contribution appears in Urdu.

He was born as Syed Qaim Mehdi Naqvi on 6 September 1931 in Karachi, India. He was the grandson of Fazil Lakhnavi, an Islamic scholar and son of Nawab Syed Akhtar Hussain Masood Lakhnavi who belonged to Ghufran Ma’ab family. He did his matriculation in 1937 from his hometown, and later attended a government college in Ludhiana for higher education. However, he was suspended from the college due to his uncertain irresponsibility, and he subsequently attended Government Dayal Singh College, Lahore where he was again suspended due to his alleged involvement in biological basis of love. He then obtained Master of Arts and Bachelor of Laws in Karachi. He had four daughters and one son.

== Career ==
Sahir wrote prose and poetry in Urdu language, however he is primarily recognised for writing marsiya and qasida besides gazals and nazms. He published most of his work during his aging-associated disease. His research work on mersia titled Marsiya Per Aitrazat Ka Tanqidi Jaiza is recognised one of the prominent publications which covers the history of mersia.

=== Publications ===
Key
†	Notes denote a short description of the work where available.

#	Title	Year	Type/Credited as	Notes	Ref.
1	Sahifa Madhas	—N/a	Qasida		
2	Aayat-e-Dard	—N/a	Marsiya		
3	Ehsaas-e-Gham	—N/a	Marsiya		
4	Qutub Shah Se Sahir Tak	—N/a	Marsiya		
5	Faqa Wa Dhamsheer	—N/a	Marsiya		
6	Shaksi Marsia	—N/a	Marsiya		
7	Yakeen-e-Qamil	—N/a	Book	A book covering religious issues and its related topics	
8	Imani Sha Parey	—N/a	Book	A book comprising religious articles or texts	
9	Laho Rang Sehra	—N/a	Book	It comprises lamentations and traditions	
10	Aayeena Shamas Nama	—N/a	Book		
11	Baaten Humari Reh Gayi	—N/a	Book		
12	Bare Sageer Mein Ehtijaaj Ka Aagaz	—N/a	Book		
13	Critical Review and Objections on Marsia	—N/a	Book	A research book covering history of marsiya	
14	Mata-e-Gham	—N/a	Book	a collection of mersias	

== Death ==
He died on 25 November 2019 in Karachi, Pakistan after a chronic medical complication. He is buried in Wadi-e-Hussain cemetery.
