= Qalandar Bakhsh Jurat =

Indian poet

Qalandar Shah Bakhsh jurat
- Born: Yahya Khan; Delhi
- Died: Lucknow
- Known for: Poetry
- Notable work: Kulliyaat e Jurat

Qalandar Bakhsh Jurat was an Indian poet of the Lucknow school. His real name was Yahya Aman. He was born in about 1748 in Delhi but spent his childhood in Faizabad and later migrated to Lucknow. He was the disciple of Mirza Jafar Ali Hasrat and a close friend of Insha Allah Khan 'Insha'. He is known for depicting romantic encounters with the beloved in lurid details. Jurat lost his eyesight in the prime of youth. He was fond of Poetry since his childhood. He was expert in Music and Astrology.

He was not a highly educated person, but he was sharp-witted and imaginative and was a regular at the court of Sulieman Shikoh. He was a fluent writer of ghazals. He died in Lucknow in 1809. A collection of his ghazals – Kuliyaat e Jurat, was last published in 1968 by Majlis Taraqii e Adab, Lahore.

A sher from his ghazal:

اب گزارا نہیں اس شوخ کے در پر اپنا

جس کے گھر کو یہ سمجھتے تھے کہ ہے گھر اپنا

== Books published after his death ==
Works published posthumously:

- Muntakhab Deewan-e-Jurat – Gudasta-e-Musarrat in 1868: Publisher: Matba Nizami, Kanpur
- Kulyat-e-Jurat Volume 001 in 1968: Editor: Iqtida Hassan. Publisher: Majlis-e-Taraqqi-e-Adab, Lahore.
- Kulyate-e-Jurat in 1971: Editor: Noorul Hassan Naqvi. Publisher: Matba Muslim University Aligarh.
- Intikhab Kalam-e-Jura'at in 1980: Editor: M. Habeeb Khan. Publisher: Jamal Printing Press, Delhi.

== Poetry collection ==
Jurat's 78 Ghazals and 122 Shers are available on Rekhta.org.:

== Ghazal sung by artist ==
His Ghazal "Aye dil hum hove paband e gham e yar ke tu" was sung by Ustad Amanat Ali Khan.
