= Qat'aa =

Style of poetry

Qat'aa is a style of poetry and part of the elegiac genre of soaz dedicated to Husayn ibn Ali.

== See also ==
- Na'at
