= Asghar Gondvi =

Indian poet

- Born: Asghar Husain; 1884; Gorakhpur, North-Western Provinces, British India
- Died: 1936 (aged 51–52) Allahabad, United Provinces, British India
- Genres: Ghazal
- Occupation: Poet

Asghar Husain Asghar (1884–1936) popularly known by his pen name Asghar Gondvi, was an Urdu poet born in 1884 in Gorakhpur, British India.

Gondvi's father Munshi Tafazzal Hussain lived in the district of Gorakhpur but permanently shifted to Gonda for his livelihood, continuing to work as "law officer". His primary education was done at home. He then did not get any formal education. He spent time at an English medium school and left in the seminary. He was naturally interested in knowledge and literature. Thus, in pursuit of personal efforts and studies, he had achieved very well-earned knowledge. Asghar Gondvi's study had created a great light inside him, under which he started writing poetry and meeting poets, but officially he began to show his poetry to Munshi Jalilullah Wajd Bulgarami to correct his poetry. Even he used to show his poetry to Munshi Amirullah for correction and improvement from him. However, when balance and fluidity was created in his poetry, he stopped the studentship from them. In the same period, he had also joined an Urdu magazine "Hindustani", and he was associated with this magazine as the editor for many years.

== Poetry ==
His collection of poetry "Kulliyaat Asghar Gondvi" is available at archives.

His selected poems were compiled and published his anthology the spiritual and mystic in nature by Abdul Aziz Sahir in the name "Intekhab e Kalam Asghar Gondvi" in the year 2016.

== Death ==
He died due to paralysis in 1936 at Allahabad.
