= Aftab Iqbal Shamim =

Pakistani academic (1933–2024)

- Born: 16 February 1936; Jhelum, British India
- Died: 26 July 2024 (aged 88)
- Occupations: Professor of English/Urdu literature Poet
- Known for: Urdu language poetry
- Awards: Pride of Performance Award by the President of Pakistan in 2006

Aftab Iqbal Shamim (Urdu: آفتاب اقبال شمیم; (16 February 1933 – July 26, 2024) was an Urdu language poet and educator from Pakistan.

== Career ==
Aftab Iqbal was born in Jhelum, Pakistan in 1933. He served as a professor of English literature and language for 33 years at Government Gordon College, Rawalpindi. He also taught Urdu language and literature to Chinese students at Beijing University for 12 years. His Chinese students have served in various high positions such as ambassadors, cultural secretaries, counsellors and high government officials in China and Pakistan.

He started writing Urdu poetry at a very early stage of his life. His poetry has been published in reputed literary magazines like Adabi Dunya and Funoon.

Shamim died on 26 July 2024, at the age of 88.

== Awards and recognition ==
- Pride of Performance Award by the President of Pakistan in 2006.

== Selected collections of poems ==
- Farda Nizhad
- Zaid Se Mukalma (1982)
- Gum Samandar
- Mein Nazm Likhta Houn
