= Anjum Rehbar =

Indian poet

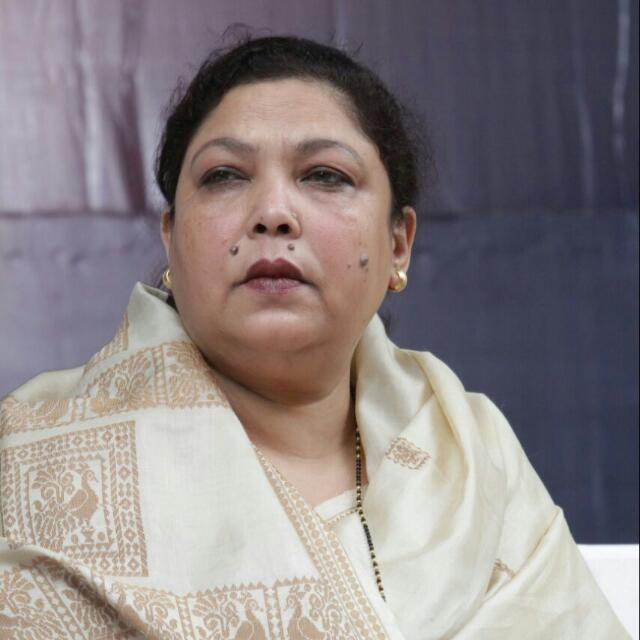
- Born: 17 September 1962 (age 64); Guna, Madhya Pradesh, India
- Citizenship: Indian
- Education: MA Urdu
- Occupations: Urdu poet, lyricist
- Children: Sameer Rahat
- Writing career
- Genres: Ghazal, Geet
- Notable awards: Indira Gandhi Award, Chitransh Firaq Gorakhpuri Award, Sahitya Bharti Award
- Website: anjumrehbar.com

Anjum Rehbar (born 17 September 1962) is an Indian poet writing in Urdu and Hindi.

== Biography ==
Anjum Rehbar was born in Guna district Madhya Pradesh. She completed her post-graduate studies in Urdu Literature.

Rehbar began participating in Mushairas and Kavi sammelans in 1977, and has recited for several national television channels including ABP News, SAB TV, Sony Pal, ETV Network, and DD Urdu. In recent years, she has appeared on Wah! Wah! Kya Baat Hai! on SAB TV. She also appeared at the Kapil sharma show at the Holi special 2019.

== Awards ==
In recognition of her contributions to Hindi literature, Rehbar has received awards including:

- Indira Gandhi Award 1986
- Ram-Rikh Manhar Award
- Sahitya Bharti Award
- Hindi Sahitya Sammelan Award
- Akhil Bhartiya Kavivar Vidyapeeth Award
- Dainik Bhaskar Award
- Chitransh Fiqar Gorakhpuri Award
- Guna ka Gaurav Award

== Books ==
- Malmal Kacche Rangon Ki - 2018
