= Khwaja Mir Dard =

Urdu poet (1720–1785)

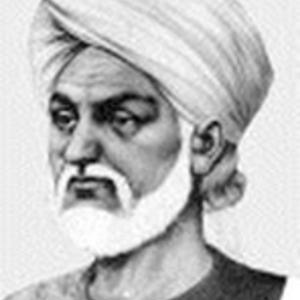
- Khwaja Mir Dard
- Born: نورالناصر خواجہ میر محمدی; 1720; Delhi, Mughal Empire
- Died: 1785 (64-65)
- Occupation: poet
- Writing career
- Language: Urdu
- Genres: nafsi, lafzi
- Notable works: Chahaar Risaala, Ilm-ul Kitaab

Khwaja Mir Dard (1720–1785) was a poet from Delhi, known for his contribution to Urdu poetry.

== Poetry ==
Dard's couplet on this illusory life, from 'Ilm-ul-Kitab':

دوستو، دیکها تماشا یاں کا بس
تُم رہو خوش ہم تو اپنے گھر چلے ۔

— Dard
Translation:

My friends, we have seen enough of this play.
We are going home, you can stay.
