= Arzoo Lakhnavi =

Pakistani poet, lyricist

Allamah Arzoo Lakhnavi
- Born: Syed Anwar Hussain; February 16, 1873; North-Western Provinces, British India
- Died: April 17, 1951 (aged 78); Karachi, Pakistan
- Parent: Mir Zakir Hussain 'Yas' (father)
- Relatives: Mir Yusuf Hussain 'Qayas' (brother)
- Writing career
- Pen name: Arzoo Lakhnavi
- Language: Urdu
- Genres: Gazal; Marsiya; Qasida; Mathnawi; Rubaʿi; Naʽat; Chronogram

Arzoo Lakhnavi (born Syed Anwar Hussain; 16 February 1873 – 17 Apr 1951 (Note: some sources indicate that he died on 16 April 1991, while some indicate 16 April 1951. However, most of the sources, including Rekhata indicates that he died on 17 April 1951)), also known by the honorary title Allamah Arzoo Lakhnavi, was a Pakistani Urdu poet and lyricist. He wrote almost in every genre of Urdu poetry such as marsiya, qasida, mathnawi, rubaʿi, naʽat, chronogram inscriptions and particularly gazals and lyrics throughout his life, also writing radio plays and scripts for several uncertain Urdu films.

He was born to a poet Mir Zakir Hussain 'Yas' as Syed Anwar Hussain around 16 February 1873 in North-Western Provinces, British India (in modern-day Lucknow, India). He was the elder brother of an Urdu poet, Mir Yusuf Hussain 'Qayas'.

== Biography ==
He was associated with poetry during his school days. He was taught by Jalal Lakhnavi, an Urdu poet. He received his initially schooling at his home and later went to Lucknow where he studied Persian and Arabic languages. He wrote his first marsiya at an apparent age of twelve. In 1942, he went to Bombay where he established his association with Hindi film industry. Following the partition, he later migrated to Pakistan where he remained associated with the Radio Pakistan in Karachi. He wrote poetry in various forms, however he earned his recognition with ghazals. His authorship includes seven diwans such as Fughan-e-Arzoo, Jahan-e-Arzoo and Nishan-e-Arzoo consisting of 25,000 ghazals. He earned the title "Allamah" primarily for ghazal writings. Most of his work, particularly ghazals revolves around romance. He wrote lyrics for Hindi films such as Karoon Kya Aas, Dushman, Street Singer among others. He also wrote a book titled Sureeli Bansuri in Urdu.

He died on 17 April 1951 in Karachi, Pakistan.
