= Wasim Barelvi =

Indian poet (born 1940)

Waseem Barelvi
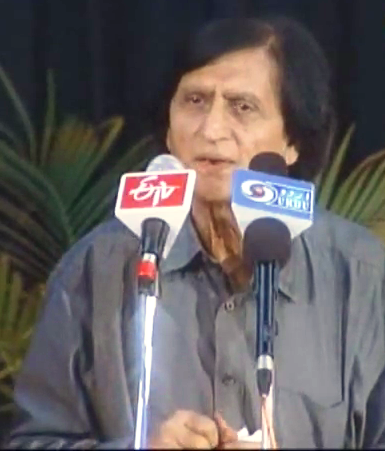
- Born: Zahid Hussain; 8 February 1940 (age 86); Bareilly, United Provinces, British India
- Occupation: Poet
- Writing career
- Years active: 1965 - Present
- Genres: Urdu poetry, Hindi poetry, Shayari

Zahid Hussain (born 18 February 1940), better known by the pen name Wasim Barelvi, is an Indian Urdu-language poet. He was born in Bareilly, Uttar Pradesh. His ghazals, many sung by Jagjit Singh, are very popular. He has been awarded with the "Firaq Gorakhpuri International Award", the Kalidas gold medal (by the Haryana government, in recognition for his services in the field of Urdu and Hindi poetry); the Begum Akhtar Kala Dharmi award; and the Naseem-e-Urdu award. Barelvi is Vice-Chairman of the National Council for Promotion of Urdu Language (NCPUL).

He has also performed at Culrav 2012 (the cultural event of NIT Allahabad). He is also Member of Legislative Council of Uttar Pradesh since 2016.

== Selected works ==
- Tabassum-e-Gham (Urdu) (1966)
- Aansu Mere Daman Tera (Hindi) (1990)
- Mizaj (Urdu) (1990)
- Aankh Aansu Hui (Urdu) (2000)
- Mera kya (Hindi) (2000)
- Aankhon Aankhon Rahe (Urdu) (2007)
- Mera kya (Urdu) (2007)
- Mausam Andar Bahar Ke (Urdu) (2007)
- Charagh (Devnagri) (2016)
- Pyar Ke Do Naam (Hindi Movie) (2024)
- Mai Usko Aansuo Se Likh Rha Hu (Urdu Poetry) (2025)
