= Nazm =

Urdu poetry genre

Nazm (Urdu: نَظْم, romanized: naẓm, lit. 'order, arrangement, sequence') is a major part of Urdu, Punjabi and Sindhi poetry that is normally written in rhymed verse and also in modern prose-style poems. Nazm is a significant genre of Urdu, Punjabi and Sindhi poetry; the other one is known as ghazal.

Nazm is significantly written by controlling one’s thoughts and feelings, which are constructively discussed as well as developed and finally, concluded, according to the poetic laws. The title of the nazm itself holds the central theme as a whole. While writing nazm, it is not important to follow any rules as it depends on the writer. A nazm can be long or short and there are no restrictions on size or rhyme scheme. All the verses written in a nazm are interlinked.

== Forms of nazm ==
The following are the different forms of nazm:

- Doha (دوہا)
- Geet (گیت)
- Hamd (حمد)
- Hijv (ہجو)
- Kafi (کافی)
- Madah (مدح)
- Manqabat (منقبت)
- Marsiya (مرثیہ)
- Masnavi (مثنوی)
- Munajat (مناجات)
- Musaddas (مسدس)
- Mukhammas (مخمس)
- Naʽat (نعت)
- Noha (نوحہ)
- Qasida (قصیدہ)
- Qat'ã (قطعہ)
- Qawwali (قوالی)
- Rubai (رباعی) (also called rubayyat or rubaiyat) (رباعیات)
- Salaam (سلام)
- Sehra (سہرا)
- Shehr a'ashob (شہر آشوب)
- Soz (سوز)
- Wasokht (وسوخت)
- Tarana (ترانہ)

== Urdu nazm poets ==
Notable nazm poets include:

- Nazeer Akbarabadi
- Majeed Amjad
- Syed Waheed Ashraf
- Kaifi Azmi
- Faiz Ahmad Faiz
- Ahmed Faraz
- Zia Fatehabadi
- Firaq Gorakhpuri
- Gulzar
- Altaf Hussain Hali
- Sir Allama Dr. Muhammad Iqbal
- Molana Inamur Rahman Inam Thanvi
- Ali Sardar Jafri
- Hafeez Jalandhri
- Sahir Ludhianvi
- Josh Malihabadi
- Moeen Nizami
- Ahmed Nadeem Qasmi
- Noon Meem Rashid
- Ismail Merathi
- Naqi Naqvi (Pakistan)
