= List of Urdu authors =

Urdu_example

This is a list of notable Urdu-language writers.

Bilal

- Akbar Allahabadi
- Altaf Fatima
- Maikash Akbarabadi
- Akhtar Sheerani
- Ada Jafri
- Aizaz Ahmad Azar
- Jamiluddin Aali
- Ghulam Abbas
- Khwaja Ahmad Abbas
- Mirza Adeeb
- Chaudhry Afzal Haq
- Wazir Agha
- Anwaar Ahmad
- Aziz Ahmad
- Ali Akbar Natiq
- Malikzada Manzoor Ahmad
- Ashfaq Ahmed
- Faruqi Nisar Ahmed
- Ahmad Nadeem Qasmi
- Saeed Ahmad Akhtar
- Waheed Akhtar
- Zamin Ali
- Amjad Islam Amjad
- Majeed Amjad
- Rasheed Amjad
- Mir Amman
- Rais Amrohvi
- Satyapal Anand
- Sahar Ansari
- Syed Amin Ashraf
- Syed Waheed Ashraf
- Hasan Askari
- Abul Hasan Ali Hasani Nadwi
- Abul Kalam Azad
- Idris Azad
- Jagan Nath Azad
- Muhammad Husain Azad
- Abdul Hameed
- Ayub Sabir
- Amjad Parvez

== B ==
- Bekal Utsahi
- Obaidullah Baig
- Fatima Surayya Bajia
- Ahmad Bashir
- Rajinder Singh Bedi
- Begum Akhtar Riazuddin
- Abdaal Bela
- Patras Bokhari
- Baba Mohammad Yahya Khan

== C ==
- Mohinder Pratap Chand
- Krishan Chander
- Harcharan Chawla
- Ismat Chughtai
- Kausar Chandpuri

== D ==
- Ehsan Danish
- Khwaja Mir Dard
- Deputy Nazir Ahmad Dehlvi
- Abdul Qavi Desnavi
- Attash Durrani

== E ==
- Jaun Elia

== F ==
- Faiz Ahmed Faiz
- Farhat Ishtiaq
- Ahmed Faraz
- Bushra Farrukh
- Aslam Farrukhi
- Shamsur Rahman Faruqi
- Mehr Lal Soni Zia Fatehabadi
- Farman Fatehpuri
- Niaz Fatehpuri
- Kanwal Feroze
- Bhupendra Nath Kaushik "Fikr"
- Maulana Fuzail Ahmad Nasiri “Ambar”

== G ==
- Altaf Gauhar
- Mirza Ghalib
- Firaq Gorakhpuri
- Majnoon Gorakhpuri
- Tahir Aslam Gora

== H ==
- Altaf Hussain Hali
- Muhammad Hamidullah
- Maulvi Abdul Haq
- Shan-ul-Haq Haqqee
- Muzaffar Hasan
- Zahida Hina
- Panchakshari Hiremath
- Ashfaq Hussain
- Intizar Hussain
- Rafiq Hussain
- Qurratulain Hyder
- Hashim Nadeem
- Hasrat Mohani

== I ==
- Muhammad Ilyas
- Ibn-e-Insha
- Ibrahim Jalees
- Muhammad Iqbal
- Ibn-e-Safi
- Ikram Chughtai
- Ishtiaq Ahmad

== J ==
- Jigar Moradabadi
- Jaun Elia
- Ali Sardar Jafri
- Habib Jalib
- Jameel Jalibi
- Khalid Jawed

== K ==
- Mazhar Kaleem
- Abul Khair Kashfi
- Agha Shorish Kashmiri
- Nasir Kazmi
- Khalique Ibrahim Khalique
- Karamat Ali Karamat
- Ghulam Mustafa Khan
- Muhammad Khan
- Maulana Wahiduddin Khan
- Syed Ahmed Khan
- Zafar Ali Khan
- Dushyant Kumar
- Kanhaiya Lal Kapoor

== L ==
- Maqbool Ahmed Lari
- Muzaffar Ahmad Lari
- Nurul Ain Lari

== M ==
- Maghfoor Ahmad Ajazi
- Maulana Ghulam Rasool Mehr
- Mohammad Ali Jauhar
- Muhammad Fazal Azim Taha
- Mubarak Ali
- Josh Malihabadi
- Arsh Malsiani
- Saadat Hasan Manto
- Anwar Maqsood
- Hajra Masroor
- Khadija Mastoor
- Abul Ala Maududi
- Mohsin Mighiana
- Mir Taqi Mir
- Janbaz Mirza
- Momin Khan Momin
- Mumtaz Mufti
- Mohsinul Mulk
- Makhdoom Mohiuddin
- Mohiuddin Qadri Zore
- Majaz

== N ==
- Naseem Hijazi
- Tahir Naqvi
- Gopi Chand Narang
- Mir Gul Khan Nasir
- Zehra Nigah
- Shibli Nomani
- Asif Noorani
- Naeem Baig
- Najeeba Arif
- Ghulam-us-Saqlain Naqvi
- Moeen Nizami
- Mohiuddin Nawab

== P ==
- Munshi Premchand
- Patras Bokhari
- Munir Niazi

== Q ==
- Ghulam Muhammad Qasir
- Ahmad Nadeem Qasmi
- Attaul Haq Qasmi
- Bano Qudsia
- Haider Qureshi
- Qudratullah Shahab

== R ==
- Ahfaz ur Rahman
- Razia Butt
- Bushra Rahman
- Hakim Syed Zillur Rahman
- Shakeelur Rahman
- Shafiq ur Rahman
- Samina Raja
- Malik Ram
- Noon Meem Rashid
- Fahmida Riaz
- Abbas Rizvi
- Khurshid Rizvi
- Mirza Muhammad Hadi Ruswa
- Rauf Parekh
- Qamar Siddiqui
- Rashid-un-Nisa

== S ==
- Syed Sajjad Haider Yaldram
- Saeed Ahmad Akbarabadi
- Syed Azhar Shah Qaiser
- Shaukat Thanvi
- Sulaiman Nadvi
- Imdad Sabri
- Agha Sadiq
- Ibne Safi
- Ghazi Salahuddin
- Akhtar Raza Saleemi
- Mirza Sauda
- Qasim Mahmood
- Mahmood Shaam
- Qudratullah Shahab
- Saif Ahmad
- Abdul Halim Sharar
- Qateel Shifai
- Abul Lais Siddiqui
- Rasheed Ahmad Siddiqi
- Shaukat Siddiqui
- Parveen Shakir
- Sayyid Ahmedullah Qadri

== T ==
- Umrao Tariq

== U ==
- Umera Ahmad

== W ==
- Wahab Ashrafi
- Muzaffar Warsi
- Raees Warsi
- Raza Naqvi Wahi
- Wasif Ali Wasif

== Y ==
- Mushtaq Ahmad Yusufi

== Z ==
- Zafar Ali Khan
- Razia Sajjad Zaheer
- Sajjad Zaheer
- Anwer Zahidi
- Ali Jawad Zaidi
- Mustafa Zaidi
- Ibrahim Zauq
- Kanwal Ziai

== See also ==
- Urdu-language literature
- List of Urdu-language poets
- List of Pakistani writers
- List of Pakistani poets
- List of Hindi-language authors
- List of Urdu language novelists
