= List of Urdu humorists =

This is the list of those literary Humorist who did the works in Urdu language in the forma of both Prose and Poetry. Most of the writer comes from Pakistan and India.

== List ==
- Akbar Allahabadi
- Ratan Nath Dhar Sarshar
- Mirza Farhatullah Baig
- Rasheed Ahmad Siddiqui
- Azeem baig chughtai
- Zafar Ali Khan
- Josh Malihabadi
- Maulana Ghulam Rasool Mehr
- Patras Bokhari
- M. D. Taseer
- Chiragh Hasan Hasrat
- Imtiaz Ali Taj
- Kanhaiya Lal Kapoor
- Krishan Chander
- Saadat Hasan Manto
- Shafiq-ur-Rahman
- Shaukat Thanvi
- Mushtaq Ahmad Yusufi
- Colonel Muhammad Khan
- Ibn-e-Insha
- Fikr Taunsvi
- Ibrahim Jalees
- Khalid Akhtar
- Mujtaba Hussain
- Muhammad Munawar Mirza
- Muhammad Rustam Kayani
- Zamir Jafri
- Ghulam Jilani Khan
- Ata ul Haq Qasmi
- Haji Laq Laq
- Raja Mehdi Ali Khan
- Anwar Masood
