= List of Pakistani writers =

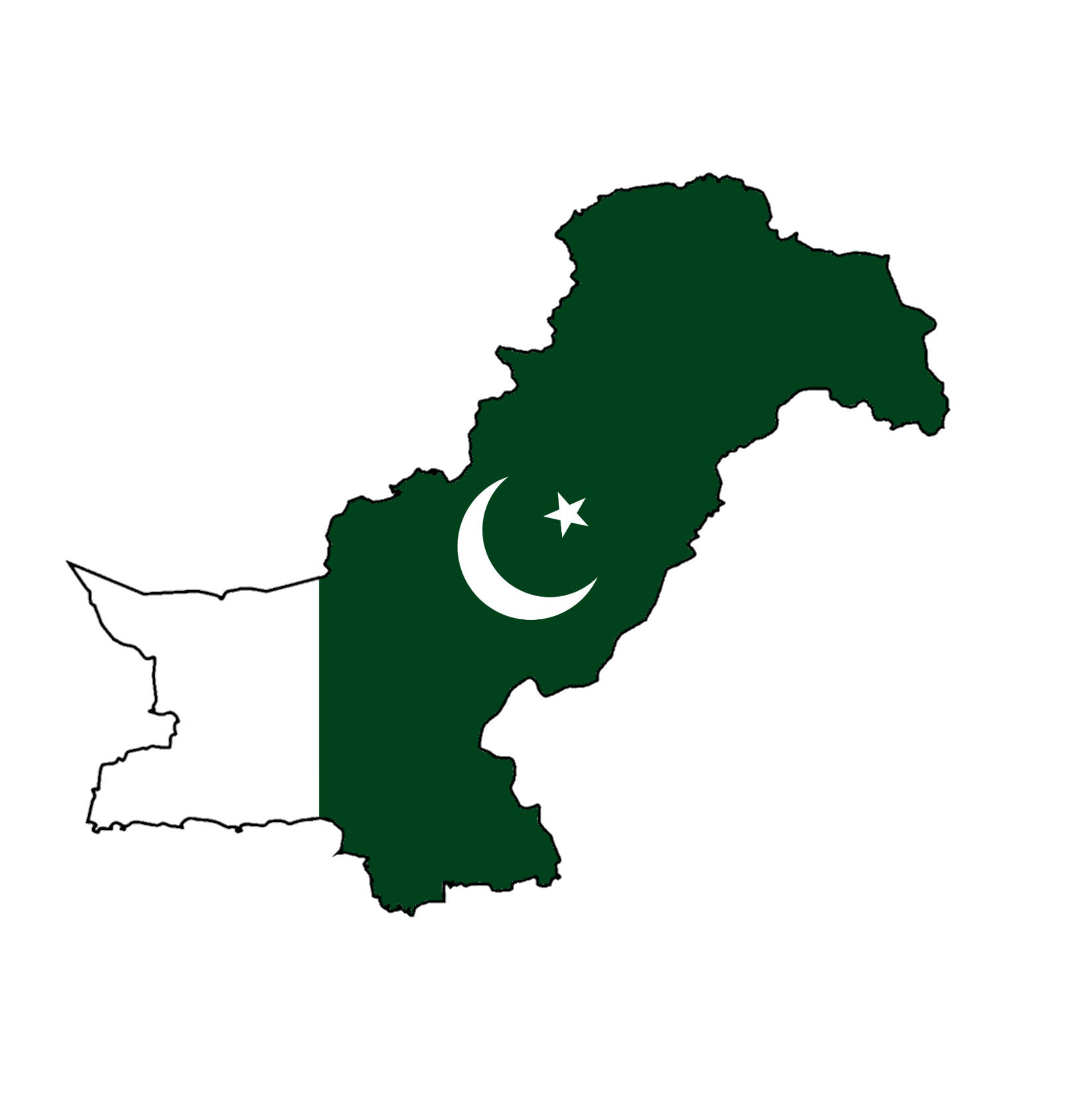
Pakistan

This is a list of Pakistani writers of fiction and nonfiction who are native to, or born in Pakistan, writing in any language.

== A ==
- Abdul Hameed
- Abdul Jabbar Junejo
- Abdul Qadir Junejo
- Adam Nayyar
- Afzal Tauseef
- Ahfaz ur Rahman
- Agha Shorish Kashmiri
- Ahmad Faraz
- Ahmad Mallah, Haji
- Ahmad Nadeem Qasimi
- Akhtar Raza Saleemi
- Alamgir Hashmi
- Ali Akbar Natiq
- Altaf Fatima
- Ali Moeen
- Altaf Gauhar
- Amar Jaleel
- Amjad Islam Amjad
- Amjad Parvez
- Annie Ali Khan
- Anwar Maqsood
- Anwaar Ahmad
- Anwer Zahidi
- Ashfaq Ahmed
- Arshad Sharif
- Ata ul Haq Qasmi
- Attash Durrani
- Ayub Sabir
- Ather Shah Khan Jaidi
- Abdur Rauf Urooj

== B ==
- Badam Natawan
- Bano Qudsia
- Bapsi Sidhwa
- Begum Akhtar Riazuddin
- Bina Shah
- Bushra Rahman

== C ==
- Chaudhry Afzal Haq
- Colonel Muhammad Khan

== D ==
- Daniyal Mueenuddin
- Daud Kamal

== F ==
- Faiz Ahmad Faiz
- Farhat Ishtiaq
- Farooq Qaiser
- Fasih Bari Khan
- Fatima Bhutto
- Fatima Surayya Bajia
- Fatima Bhutto
- Fawzia Afzal-Khan
- Farman Fatehpuri

== G ==
- Ghulam Hassan Lobsang
- Ghulam Muhammad Girami, Maulana
- Ghulam Muhammad Qasir

== H ==
- Hajra Masroor
- Hakim Ahmad Shuja
- Hakim Said
- Hamza Shinwari
- Harris Khalique
- Haider Qureshi
- Hassan Nisar

== I ==
- Ibn-e-Safi
- Ibn-e-Insha
- Ibrahim Jalees
- Idris Azad
- Iftikhar Arif
- Ihsan Danish
- Ilyas Sitapuri
- Imdad Hussaini
- Imtiaz Ali Taj
- Intizar Hussain
- Ishtiaq Ahmad
- Ismail Ahmedani
- Israr Ahmed

== J ==
- Janbaz Mirza
- Jazib Qureshi
- Javed Ahmad Ghamidi
- Jawayd Anwar

== K ==
- Kaleemullah Lashari
- Khadija Mastoor
- Kamila Shamsie
- Kishwar Naheed
- Khalil-ur-Rehman_Qamar
- Khan Roshan Khan

== M ==
- Mahmood Shaam
- Masood Ashraf Raja
- Mazhar ul Islam
- Mirza Adeeb
- Mirza Ibrahim
- Muhammad Fazal Azim Taha
- Mohammad Hanif
- Mohiuddin Nawab
- Muhammad Asad
- Muhammad Siddique Memon, Khan Bahadur
- Muhammad Siddique Musafir
- Taqi Usmani
- Mohsin Bhopali
- Mohsin Hamid
- Muhammad Asim Butt
- Muhammad Munawwar Mirza
- Muhammad Tahir-ul-Qadri
- Muhammad Umar Memon
- Mumtaz Mufti
- Muneeza Shamsie
- Musharraf Ali Farooqi
- Mustansar Hussain Tarar
- Mushtaq Ahmed Yousfi
- M. Athar Tahir
- Muniba Mazari
- Munir Niazi

== N ==
- Nabi Bux Khan Baloch
- Najeeba Arif
- Naseem Hijazi
- Naseem Thebo
- Nasir Kazmi
- Noorul Huda Shah

== O ==
- Allamah Kaukab Noorani Okarvi
- Osman Khalid Butt

== P ==
- Patras Bokhari
- Partawi Shah

== Q ==
- Qudrat Ullah Shahab
- Qurat-ul-Ain Haider

== R ==
- Raees Warsi
- Rahim Gul
- Rasheed Ahmed Siddique
- Rashid Sabir

== S ==
- Saadat Hasan Manto
- Saeed Ahmad Akhtar
- Saeed Rashid
- Sarfraz Manzoor
- Shahbaz Malik
- Shahid Nadeem
- Shaikh Ayaz
- Shaukat Siddiqui
- Shaukat Thanvi
- Shafiq-ur-Rehman
- Sumaira Zareen

== T ==
- Tahir Alauddin
- Tahir Naqvi
- Tehmina Durrani
- Tarique Ashraf
- Tariq Ali

== U ==
- Usman Peerzada

== W ==
- Wasif Ali Wasif
- Wazir Agha

== Y ==
- Yusuf Hussain Abadi

== Z ==
- Zaib-un-nissa Hamidullah
- Zeenat Abdullah Channa
- Zulfikar Ghose
- Zafar Mairaj
- Zia Ur Rehman

== See also ==
- List of Pakistani poets
- List of Pakistani women writers
- List of Urdu-language poets
