= Mahnaz Rahman =

Pakistani journalist, Women's Rights Activist (1949)

Mahnaz Rahman مہناز رحمان
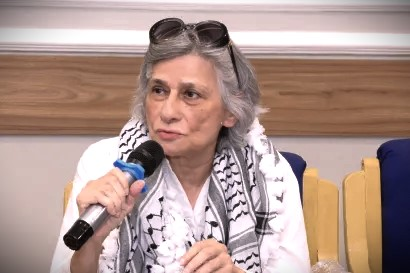
- Born: Mahnaz Rahman; 16 June 1949 (age 76); Karachi, Pakistan
- Known for: Writing, Women's Rights Activism

Mahnaz Rahman (Urdu: مہناز رحمان ) (born 16 June 1949) is a Pakistani journalist, writer, and women's rights activist. A former socialist leader in the National Students Federation (NSF), she received China's "Friendship Award" for her "outstanding contributions to the country's economic and social progress".

== Personal life ==
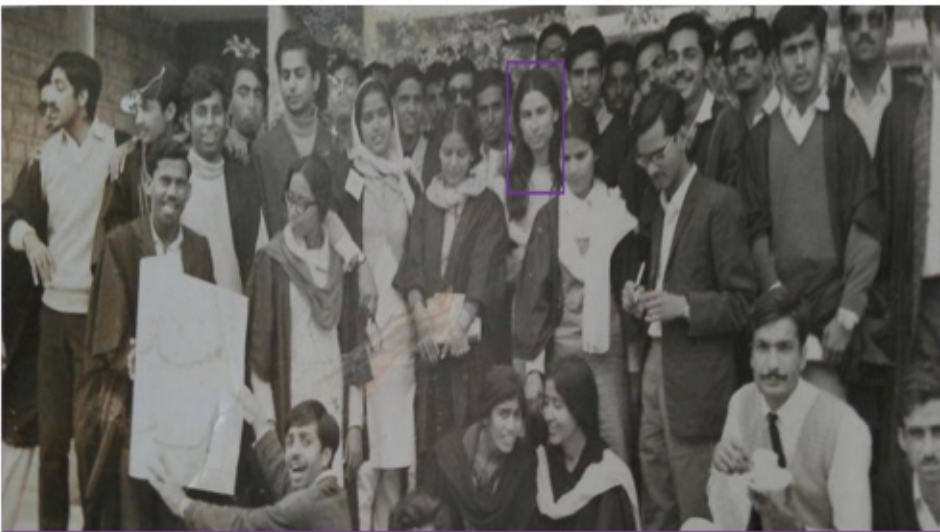
Fellow University students and friends celebrating Mahnaz’s victory on becoming Vice President of Economics Society, University of Karachi

Mahnaz Rahman, born in Karachi in 1949, studied at Karachi University, where she joined the National Students Federation (NSF). She became the first female vice president of the Economics Society in the largest department at the University at the time, after winning an election on the NSF platform.

== Journalistic career ==
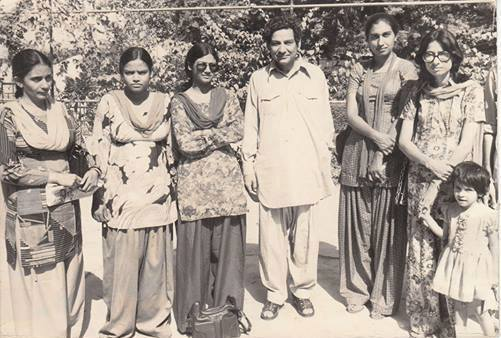
Mahnaz and other journalists with legendary journalist and trade union leader Minhaj Barna

After graduation, Rahman joined Daily Musawat Karachi, working in the magazine section with editor Ahfazur Rahman, whom she later married. Together, they actively participated in the movement against Zia-ul-Haq's dictatorship. Following Musawat's closure, she worked at Weekly Mehvar and later at Daily Amn.

== In China ==
In 1985, Rahman moved to China with her family due to her husband's blacklisting, staying there until 1993. During this time, she wrote two regular columns, "Letters from China" for Daily Jang and "Letters from Beijing" for Weekly Akhbar-e-Jahan. She also translated several works of Chinese literature into Urdu. In 1991, the Chinese government honoured her with the Friendship Award (China) for her "outstanding contributions to the country's economic and social progress."

== Advocacy in Pakistan ==
After returning to Pakistan, Rahman joined various NGOs and later served nearly 20 years at the Aurat Foundation, including as Resident Director Sindh. During her tenure, the organization advocated for and contributed to implementing several laws and safeguards for women. She is also an active member of the Human Rights Commission of Pakistan (HRCP).

=== Activism ===
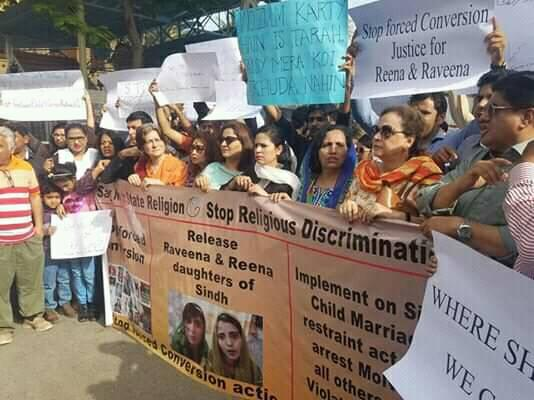

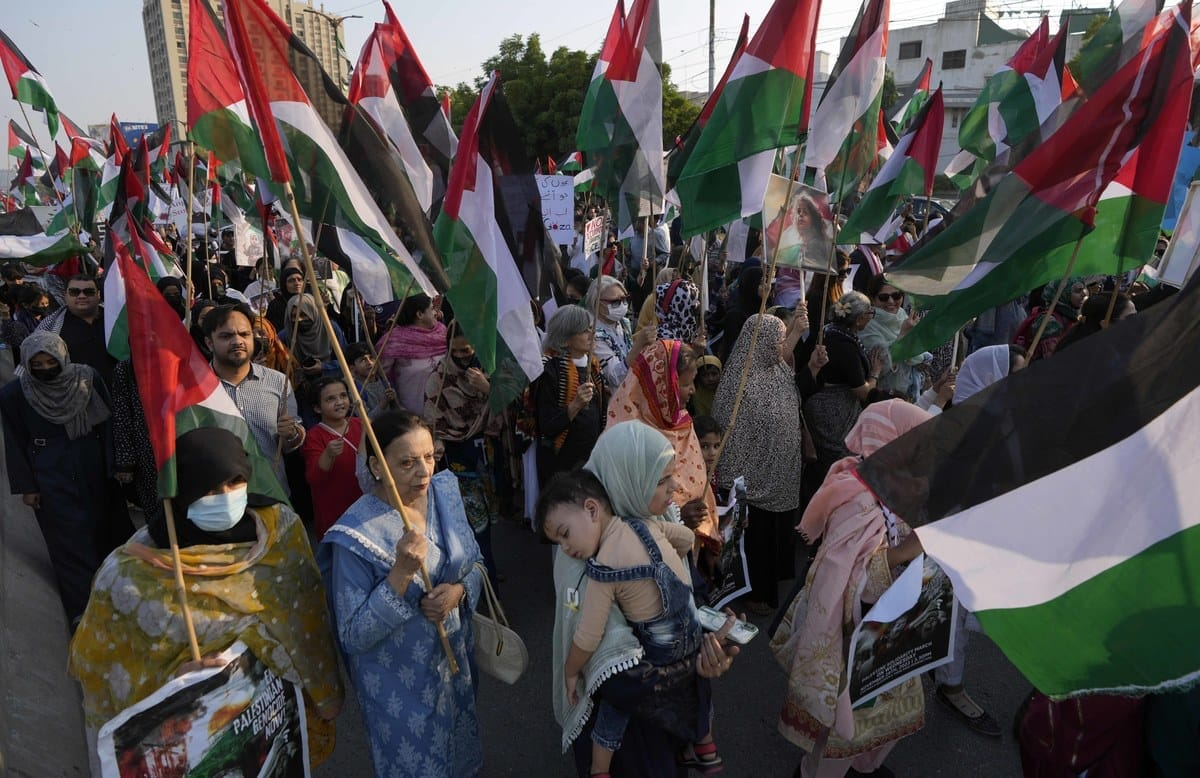

- Activism for Freedom of Speech including provincial rights
- Activism for women's rights in particular pro-women legislation
- Journalists trade union activities including taking part in freedom of press movements

=== In newspapers as ===
- Foreign Expert, China Pictorial, Beijing 1990-1993
- Assistant Editor Daily Amn, 1982-1985
- Assistant Editor, Weekly Mehvar 1979-1982
- Sub Editor Daily Musawaat, 1973-77

== See also ==
- List of Pakistani journalists
- List of Pakistani writers
- List of Urdu writers
