= Kewal Dheer =

Indian writer and author

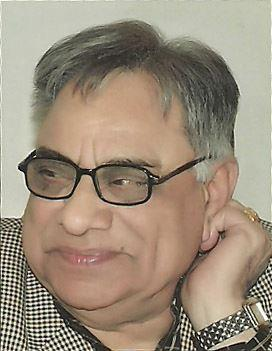
- Born: 5 October 1938 (age 87); Gaggo, Punjab, British India (modern Pakistan)
- Occupations: Writer, retired govt. officer
- Writing career
- Genres: Fiction, psychology
- Notable works: Badchalan, Yadon-Ke-Khandar, Apna Daman Apni Aag, Bikhari-Hui-Zindagi, Dharti-Ro-Padi, Sanjh Ki Parchhaiyan, Manto Mera Dost, Yadon Ki Dastak

Kewal Dheer (born 5 October 1938) is an Indian writer and author.

== Early life ==
Dheer was born on 5 October 1938 in Gaggo, a village in Montgomery District (now in District Vehari, Pakistan). He is the eldest son of social reformer Hans Raj. Dheer attended school in Phagwara and his writing was published in local magazines. As a student he was the state office bearer for Milap Bal Sangh. Dheer received a medical degree from Patna, Bihar in 1960 and began his career as Medical Officer after completing work with the Health Department of the Government of Punjab.

== Career ==
Dheer's book of short stories, "Dharti-Ro-Pari," was published in 1957. He has published ten volumes of short-stories and five novels, as well as travelogues on Pakistan, US, UK, Canada and several countries of Europe. In the 1970s Dheer founded Adeeb International and Sahir Cultural Academy. Dheer has written books on literature, psychology, human behaviour, medicine that have published in Urdu, Hindi, English, and Punjabi. He has also written television, theatre and film including Vachan, Sheeshe-Ki-Diwar,' and Gumrah. Dheer has worked as an editor for Swatantrata Weekly (1958–1960), The Signature (2000), Qamar Monthly (1967), Kitab Numa (July 2004) and Adeeb (2010).

=== Awards ===
1. 1958– Bihar Pragatisheel Sahitya Parishad State Award on Hindi short story collection "Dharti-Ro-Pari".
2. 1963– Bhasha Vibhag, Govt. of Punjab State Award on Technical Literature.
3. 1981– Indo-Pak Urdu Fiction Award instituted by "Biswin Sadi", New Delhi.
4. 1981– AOHW Asian Award for Human Welfare through literature.
5. 1983– Bhasha Vibhag, Govt. of Punjab State Award on Urdu short story collection "Bikhri Hui Zindgi".
6. 1983– U.P. Urdu Academy, Govt. of Uttar Pradesh State Award on Urdu short story collection "Bikhri Hui Zindgi".
7. 1985– U.P. Urdu Academy, Govt. of Uttar Pradesh State Award on Urdu short story collection "Apna Daman Apni Aag".
8. 1986– Punjab Hindi Sahitya Parishad Literary Award on overall contribution to Hindi literature.
9. 1986– Bihar Urdu Academy, Govt. of Bihar State Award on Urdu story Collection "Bikhri Hui Zindgi".
10. 1987– Prof. Mohan Singh Memorial Award on Punjabi short story collection "Lahu Da Rang".
11. 1987– "Honour of Peace" Award by International University of Peace, Canada on English short story collection "Bonds of Love".
12. 1988– "National Integration Award" by Hindi-Urdu Sangam, U.P.
13. 1989– "Munshi Prem Chand Fiction Award" by Ghalib Cultural Academy, Karnataka.
14. 1997– "Literary Personality of the Year Award" by Progressive Writers Association, UK
15. 1997– "Shiromani Urdu Sahityakar Award", the highest literary award of the Govt. of Punjab.
16. 2000– "European Urdu Writers Society London's "Prem Chand International Fiction Award".
17. 2000– "Bhasha Vibhag, Govt. of Punjab State Award on Urdu short story collection "Kahaniyan".
18. 2000– UK Hindi Samiti, London's gold medal, for contribution to Hindi literature.
19. 2000– Award of Excellence by Indo-Canadian Times, Vancouver Canada.
20. 2001– Millenium Award by Ghalib Cultural Academy, Karnataka.
21. 2003– Qartas – e – Aizaz Literary Award by "Chaharsoo" (Pakistan).
22. 2007– Indo – Pak Friendship Award, Pakistan.
23. 2008– Sahitya Shree Samman by Rashtriya Sahitya Parishad, New Delhi.
24. 2011– Pride of Urdu Award, Pakistan.
25. 2011– National Honour by House of Commons, Canada for promotion of universal brotherhood and

       Global Peace Through Literature.

1. 2011– State Honour by Legislative Assembly of Ontario, Canada.
2. 2012– Sultan Baho Award-2012 Pakistan.
3. 2012– Urdu Hindi Sahitya Committee Award, Lucknow.
4. 2013– Ambassador for Peace Award by SAARC Organisation for Sufism, Islamabad, Pakistan
5. 2013– Sat Paul Mittal Award of Appreciation to Service of Society through Literature by Nehru

       Sidhant Kender Trust, Ludhiana, India.The Award carries Rs. One Lac.

1. 2015- Lifetime Achievement award by The Asian Literary Foundation Inc. USA. The Award carrie

       a sum of US$5000 and a Citation.

1. 2016- National Award by Ministry of HRD, Govt. of India on Hindi Book "Dastak Yadon Ki". The

       Award carries Rs. One Lac and a Citation.                                                                                                        

1. 2019- U.P.Urdu Academy Best Book award on Urdu book "Safar Jaari Hai"

=== Publications ===
Latest Publications:SAFAR JARI HAE (Interviews and Memoirs in Urdu) Published in 2017 by Arshia Publications, New Delhi (ISBN 978-93-86872-24-1)and LOVE STORIES FROM INDIA (Short stories in Urdu)Published in 2016 by Sangemeel Publications, Lahore, Pakistan ISBN 969-35-2943-X , 13: 978-969-35-2943-2 1. The Last Waltz (2015) Short Stories in English. Published by Authors Press, New Delhi ISBN 978-93-5207-164-7 2. Dastak Yadon Ki (2014) Memoirs in Hindi. Published by Akshardham Prakashan, Kaithal (Haryana) ISBN 978-93-82341-89-5 3. Ham Dono (2014) Short Story Collection in Hindi. Published by Star Publications Ltd., New Delhi ISBN 978-81-7650-601-4

4. Manto Mera Dost (2014) Revised nd Enlarged 2nd edition. Published by Educational Publishing House, Delhi ISBN 978-93-5073-256-4 5. Manto: Adab -Aurat Aur Jins (year 2013) Published by Educational Publishing House, Delhi ISBN 978-93-5073-164-2

6. Badchalan (Urdu) (Year 2007) Published by Educational Publishing House, Delhi ISBN 81-8223-310-0 7. Yadon-Ke-Khandar (Urdu) (Year 2008) Published by Safeena-e-Adab, Lahore 8. Kahaniyan (Urdu) (Year 1999) Published by Adeeb International (Sahir Cultural Academy) Ludhiana ISBN 81-85738-65-3 9. Apna Daman Apni Aag (Urdu) (Year 1985) Published by Shan-e-Hind Publishers, New Delhi. 10. Bikhari-Hui-Zindagi (Urdu) (Year 1983) Published by Shama Book Depot, New Delhi. 11.Bonds of Love (English) (Year 1987) Published by Central Publishers, Ludhiana. 12.Dharti-Ro-Padi (Hindi) (Year 1958) Published by Parbhati Prakashan, Patna. 13.Lahu-Ka-Rang (Hindi) (Year 1989) Published by Central Publishers, Ludhiana. 14.Katha Yatra (Punjabi) (Year 2004) Published by Adeeb International (Sahir Cultural Academy), Ludhiana 15.Lahu-Da-Rang (Punjabi) (Year 1986) Published by Central Publishers, Ludhiana.

=== Novels ===
15. Sanjh Ki Parchhaiyan (Hindi) (Year 1967)Published by Mansarovar Publications, Allahabad (Regd. No. 6125/57) 16. Itni Si Baat (Hindi) (Year 1968) Published by Mansarovar Publications Allahabad (Regd. No. 6125/57) 17. Raakh Ki Parten (Hindi) (Year 1969) Published by Mansarovar Prakashan, Allahabad (Regd. No. 6125/57) 18. Sheeshe-Ki-Deewar (Hindi) (Year 1970) Published by Hindi Milap, Jalandhar

=== Travelouges ===
19. Khushboo-Ka-Safar (Urdu) (Year 1988) Travelouge on Pakistan, Published by Modern Publishing House, Delhi. 20. Gori-Ke-Desh Me (Urdu) (Year 1996) Travelouge on North America and Europe. Published by Hind Samachar, Jalandhar. 21. Mehak Da Safar (Punjabi) (Year 1989) Travelouge on Pakistan. Published by Jagbani, Jalandhar. 22. Khushboo-Ka-Safar (Hindi) (Year 1987) Published by Punjab Kesari, Jalandhar.

=== Memoirs ===
1. Manto Mera Dost (Hindi) (Year 1961) Published by Jyoti Books, Patna.
2. Manto Mera Dost (Urdu) (Year 1962) Published by Mashwara Book Depot, Delhi.
3. Nehru Ne Kaha (Hindi) (Year 1964) Published by Hind Pocket Books, Delhi.
4. Jawahar Lal Nehru (Urdu) (Year 1964) Published by Manshwara Book Depot, Delhi.
5. Rashtranayak Shastri (Hindi) (Year 1966) Published by Eagle Pocket Books, Ghaziabad.
6. Yudh Ke Morche Par (Hindi) (Year 1966) Published by Hind Pocket Books, Delhi.
7. Yadon Ki Dastak (Urdu) (Year 2012) Published by Aalmi Urdu Trust, Delhi.
8. Safar Jaari Hai (Urdu) (Year 2017) Published by Arshia Publications, Delhi. ISBN 978-93-86872-24-1.
9. Mai Lahore Hoon (Hindi) (Year 2019) Published by Unistar Publications, Chandigarh. ISBN 978-93-83296-59-0.

Books on Health, Family Welfare and Sex Education Dr. Kewal Dheer has written more than three dozen educational books on the subjects of Health, Family Welfare and Sex Education in Hindi, Urdu and Punjabi languages. These books have been published by Manoj Publications, Delhi/ Start Publications, Delhi/ Anand Paperbacks, Delhi/ N.D. Sehgal & Sons Publishers, Delhi/ Shama Book Depot, Delhi and many others. Languages Department Govt. of Punjab and A.O.H.W. awarded books on Family Planning.

=== Translations ===
1. Nadi Kinare (Year 2012) (Urdu to Hindi). Novel by Abdaal bela, Translated by Dr. Kewal Dheer, published by Sang-e-meel Publications, Lahore, Pakistan. ISBN 978-969-35-2568-7
2. Tum (Year 2012) (Urdu to Hindi). Novel by Abdaal Bela, Translated by Dr. Kewal Dheer, published by Sangemeel Publications, Lahore, Pakistan. ISBN 978-969-35-2569-4
3. Shah Saien (Year 2012) (Urdu to Hindi). Novel by Abdaal bela, Translated by Dr. Kewal Dheer, published by Sang-e-meel Publications, Lahore, Pakistan. ISBN 978-969-35-2566-3
4. Urmila (Year 2012) (Urdu to Hindi). Novel by Abdaal bela, Translated by Dr. Kewal Dheer, published by Sang-e-meel Publications, Lahore, Pakistan.
5. Lal Qila (Urdu to Hindi). Novel by Abdaal bela, Translated by Dr. Kewal Dheer, published by Sang-e-meel Publications, Lahore, Pakistan. ISBN 978-969-35-2567-0
6. Batwara (Urdu to Hindi). Novel by Abdaal bela, Translated by Dr. Kewal Dheer, published by Sangemeel Publications, Lahore, Pakistan.
7. Darwaza Khulta Hai (Urdu to Hindi). Novel by Abdaal bela, Translated by Dr. Kewal Dheer, published by Sang-e-meel Publications, Lahore, Pakistan.
8. Note : 'Darwaza Khulta Hai' is a novel of 1800 pages, written in Urdu by Abdaal bela and translated into Hindi by Dr. Kewal Dheer. This is a historical document of fiction on cultural history of un-divided India and dedicated to relations Friendship. It has been published by premier publishing house Sang-e-meel Publications, Lahore and created history by becoming the first ever publisher/printer of a Hindi book in Pakistan.

=== Television and Radio ===
1. T.V. Serial 'Vachan' (13 Episodes) produced by Doordarshan, Jalandhar (Year 1984).
2. T.V. serial 'Sheeshe-Ki-Deewar' (13 Episodes) produced by Doordarshan, Jalandhar (Year 1985)
3. T.V. play 'Gumrah' produced by Doordarshan Jalandhar (Year 1984)
4. T.V. Film, 'Indira Priyadarshani' on assassination of Mrs. Indira Gandhi produced by Doordarshan Jalandhar (Year 1984).
5. T.V. Film 'Boond Boond Sagar' on cultural history of Punjab produced by Doordarshan Jalandhar (Year 1985).
6. Literary T.V. programme 'Karwan' and more than fifty other plays/ features/ interviews were scripted/ anchored for Doordarshan.
7. More than two hundred Radio Programmes (Short Stories/ plays/ talks/ interviews) have been written/ broadcast by all India Radio/ Akashvani since year 1965.

== See also ==
- List of Indian writers
