= Harcharan =

Harcharan may refer to

- Harcharan Chawla, Urdu Writer
- Hercharn Singh, First Sikh in Pakistan Army
- Harcharan Singh Brar, Former Punjab chief Minister
- Harcharan Singh Longowal, Sikh and Akali Leader
- Harcharan Singh Balli, Indian Politician
- Harcharan Singh (field hockey), an Indian field hockey player
- Harcharanjit Singh Rapal a British-Indian bhangra musician
