= Akhtar Raza Saleemi =

Akhtar Raza Saleemi اختر رضا سلیمی
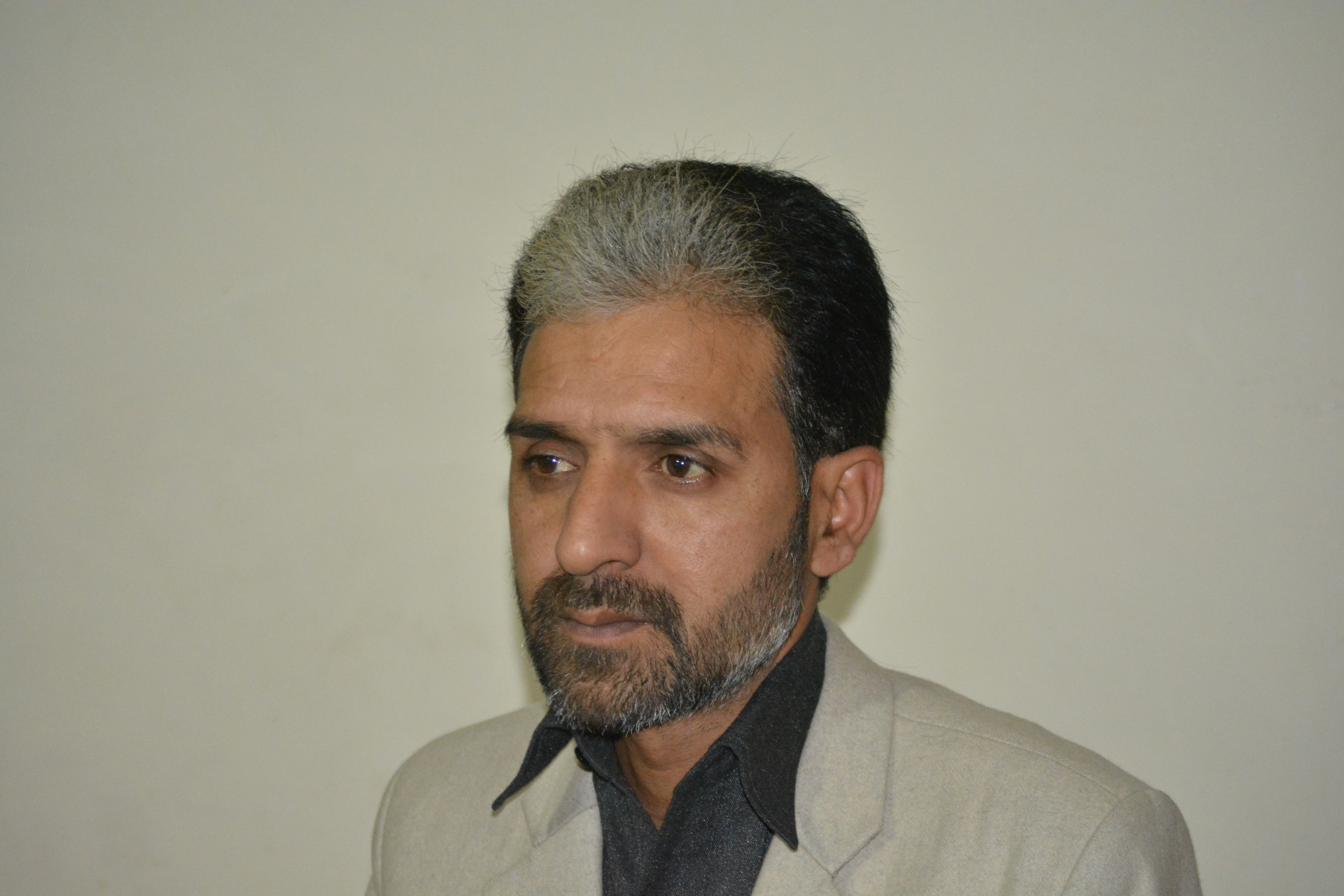
- Born: Muhammad Pervaiz Akhtar; 16 June 1974 (age 52); Kekot, Haripur, Khyber Pakhtunkhwa, Pakistan
- Citizenship: Pakistan
- Education: Allama Iqbal Open University (BA), Sargodha University (MA)
- Occupations: Poet, Novelist, Editor
- Children: 3
- Influenced by: Carl Jung, Gabriel García Márquez

Akhtar Raza Saleemi (Urdu: اختر رضا سلیمی) is a Pakistani Urdu, Hindko, and Potohari poet, novelist, writer, critic and editor. His birth name is Muhammad Pervaiz Akhtar (Urdu: محمد پرویز اختر). He is a recognized poet of both ghazal and nazm. He has published several poetry books and has been appreciated for his work by critics. He stayed in the genre of poetry till 2008 and then started experimenting with the style of novel writing. His fiction work often combines magical realism and historical fiction with a special focus on his life in his hometown. The topics of death and dreams are predominant in his novels.

His first novel, Jaagein Hain Khawab Mein (Urdu: جاگے ہیں خواب میں, Englis: "Awake in a dream") had 1001 paintings by Wasi Haider as its cover page.

His second novel Jandar (Urdu: جندر), published in 2017, received the UBL Literary Award for Fiction (2019). The novel has been translated into Brahui and Pashto.

== Biography ==
Akhtar Raza Saleemi was born on 16 June 1974, at Kekot, a village of Haripur district, Khyber Pakhtunkhwa, Pakistan. His father, Sardar Sher Zaman, is a part-time businessman.

He received his early education from his native village. When he was in fifth grade due to the strict behavior and the subsequent punishment of the teacher, he left his education. Afterwards was sent to Karachi, where his elder brother, Sardar Muhammad Saleem lived and owned a hotel. He resumed his education and in 1991 received his matriculation certificate with 2nd position.

Then he moved again to Rawalpindi, from where he cleared his FA examination in 1995.

Then he moved to Islamabad and is now settled there. He graduated from Allama Iqbal Open University in the Fall 2003. He also did his Masters in Urdu from University of Sargodha in 2011.

=== Personal life ===
He is married to his distant relative's daughter on 24 April 2004. They have two sons - Ayaan Raza Saleemi and Hannan Raza Saleemi - and one daughter, Midhat Raza Saleemi. They live in Islamabad.

== Literary career ==
Saleemi started his literary career in 1991 with a story written for children edition of Daily Jang. In this span he wrote some stories, critical and non-critical essays, however, at the behest of Ahmad Hussain Mujahid, he started doing poetry in the genre of ghazal. He has published two books on Urdu ghazals namely: Ikhtara (Urdu: اختراع) (2003), Iratafa (Urdu: ارتفاع) (2008) and one full collection of ghazals Khushbu Mere Sath Chal Pari Hai (Urdu: خوشبو مرے ساتھ چل پڑی ہے ) (2009). Critics have appreciated Saleemi's poetry in the following words: "Saleemi has chosen a difficult genre of the ghazal. It goes without saying that it is very hard to compose effective couplets. He prefers thought to the word". Another critic wrote, "Saleemi portrays a unique blend of reality and dreams expressed with exacerbated sensibility, fine sharpness of his perception, clarity, and splendour of his language." To fully express himself, Saleemi found Ghazal insufficient, therefore, he forsook it in 2008 and started experimenting with another and more relaxed form of poetry, nazm. He has published a collection of his nazms as Khaab Dan (Urdu: خواب دان) (2013).

Afterwards, he started writing novels too, which he says is his favorite genre because it has no restrictions. He has two novels to his name so far: Jaagein Hain Khaab Mein (Urdu: جاگے ہیں خواب میں ) (2015) and Jandar (Urdu: جندر) (2017). On writing novels, Saleemi says:

In all of my works, I like novel-writing the most. When I write novels, it gives me a different kind of intoxication which I have never felt when I am writing something else. This intoxication is very gloomy.

=== Professional career ===
Meanwhile, he joined the Pakistan Academy of Letters (Islamabad) in 2006 and has been working as an Urdu editor since 2013 of Quarterly Magazine Adbiyat and Adbiyat-e-Itfal, also being the pioneer of the latter. In addition to this, he acts as a coordinating editor of six magazines issued by the Pakistan Academy of Letters: Adbiyat-e-Sindh (Sindhi), Adbiyat-e-Balochistan (Baloch), Adbiyat-e-KhyberPakhtunkhwa (Pashto, Hindko), Adbiyat-e-Punjab (Punjabi, Siraiki, Potohari) and Pakistani Literature (English).

=== Critical Appreciation ===
On his first novel (Jaagein Hain Khaab Mein) Mustansar Hussain Tarar says: "This novel is a wonderous jump vis-a-vis novel-writing ... It is the dream of Urdu novel-writing that we have seeing for some time now, and now, when it is materialized, we should stand up and welcome it."

On his second novel (Jandar), Iftikhar Arif says: Every masterpiece intoxicate its readers and this novel has done just that. Muhammad Hameed Shahid says: "Jandar is very favorite novel; it is one of its kind. In this novel, life is revealed in all its veiled meanings."

In addition to the critics reviews, there are many Master's and PhD thesis done on Saleemi's works.

== Awards ==
- Quaid e Aazam literary gold medal for 2009
- Professor Muhammad Shafi Sabir Award (2015) for prose by Abasin Arts Council.
- Allah Bakhsh Yousfi Award (2018) for Prose by Abasin Arts Council.
- UBL Literary Award for Fiction (2019).

== Bibliography ==
- Ikhtara 2003 اختراع
- Irtafa 2008 ارتفاع
- Khushbu marey saath chal pari hay...2009خوشبو مِرے ساتھ چل پڑی ہے)
- Khaawab Daan 2013 (خواب دان) ( Urdu poetry)
- Har paasey parchaanwaan maahra(ہر پاسے پرچھاواں مھاڑا) ( Potohaari poetry)
- Jaage Hain Khawab Mein(جاگے ہیں خواب میں) (2015)
- Jandar (جندر) 2017
- Lawakh 2023

=== Edited works ===
Following are Saleemi's edited works:

- 2011 ki Behtareen Shayari (2012) Pakistan Academy of Letters
- Ek Mulk Ek Kahani (2015) National Book Foundation
- ECO Ke Rukn Mumalik ki Muntakhib Kahaniyan (2017) Takhleeqat
- Ao Bacho! Suno Kahani Vol. 1 & 2 (2020) National Book Foundation

== See also ==
- List of Pakistani poets
- List of Urdu language poets
- List of Pakistani writers
- List of Urdu language writers
