= Nurul Ain Lari =

Urdu poet, writer, critic and editor

Professor Nurul Ain Lari
- Born: Nurul Ain Lari; 1 July 1932; Lar, Deoria Uttar Pradesh, India
- Died: 17 March 2011 (aged 78); Gorakhpur, India
- Occupations: Poet, writer, educationist
- Writing career
- Pen name: Ahmar Lari
- Language: Urdu

Nurul Ain Lari (1 July 1932 – 13 March 2011), also known by his pen name Ahmar Lari, was a writer, poet and educationist of Urdu literature. He was a former head of the Department of Urdu, Gorakhpur University, India.

== Early life and career ==
He was born on 1 July 1932 in Lar, Uttar Pradesh. He wrote numerous books, articles and poetry in Urdu. He had written his thesis on Maulana Hasrat Mohani and was conferred Ph D Degree by Gorakhpur University. His scholarly work on Hasrat Mohani related to Urdu poetry and criticism yielded a book: Hasrat Mohani: Hayat Aur Karname in 1973. This piece of work on Mohani seemed important because it has found a place in others' work as reported elsewhere. Among others he won an award by the Uttar Pradesh Urdu Academy in 2002.

== Death ==
Ahmar Lari died on 17 March 2011 in his hometown Gorakhpur.

== See also ==
- List of people from Gorakhpur
- List of Urdu poets
- List of Urdu authors
