= Harcharan Chawla =

Urdu writer

- Born: Harcharan Dass Chawla; 4 November 1926; Mianwali, Punjab, British India (now Pakistan)
- Died: 5 November 2001 (aged 75); Oslo, Norway
- Occupation: Novelist
- Writing career
- Language: Urdu, Hindi, Punjabi, Norwegian
- Genres: Fictional prose, short story
- Notable work: Anguish of a Horse
- Literary movement: Post-Colonial

Harcharan Dass Chawla (Urdu: ہرچَرَن داس چاولہ, November 4, 1926 – November 5, 2001) was an Urdu writer.

Born to a Punjabi Hindu family in Mianwali (now Pakistan), he moved to Delhi, India as a refugee as a result of the 1947 partition of India. The event served as the backdrop for his first novel Darinday, and would leave a lasting impression throughout his career, with migration and cultural identity dominant themes of his work.

After graduating from the Panjab University in Chandigarh in 1956 and working for Indian Railways, in 1971 Chawla moved to Frankfurt, Germany then Oslo, Norway in 1974 where he would eventually settle. His shift to Europe would bring new dimension to his writing, addressing issues of loss of culture and identity faced by South Asians migrating to different parts of the world.

In Oslo, Chawla helped creating a literary bridge between the Indian subcontinent and Norway by translating Norwegian stories into Urdu and Hindi and South Asian work into Norwegian. Completing the work of his wife Purnima Chawla who died in the midst of the process, he translated Knut Hamsun's novel Victoria. En kjærlighedshistorie into Hindi and Urdu and Indian Foreteller, a compilation of stories by Indian writers into Norwegian. He was also the Urdu, Hindi and Punjabi consultant for Deichmanske Bibliotek, Oslo.

== Works ==
- Darinday, 1968 (Urdu)
- Aks Aiyene Ke, 1974 (Urdu, short stories)
- The Broken Horizon, 1974 (English, short stories)
- Ret, Samundar aur Jhag, 1980 (Urdu, short stories)
- Chiragh Ke Zakhm, 1980 (Urdu)
- Akhri Kadam se Pehle, 1983 (Hindi, short stories)
- Aate Jaate Mausmon Ka Sach Afsaney, 1984 (Urdu)
- Pani di Aurat, 1985 (Punjabi)
- Norway Ke Behtreen Afsaney, 1989 (Urdu, short stories, translated)
- Anguish of a Horse and other stories, 1990 (English, short stories)
- Dil, Dimagh aur Duniya, 1992 (Urdu, short stories)
- India Foreteller, 1992 (Norwegian, translated)
- Sach Jaise Sapne, 1992 (Urdu, short stories)
- Tumko Dekha, 1992 (Urdu, short stories)
- Bhatke Hue Log, 1993 (Urdu, Hindi)
- Dhoop Ek Chadar, 1993 (Hindi, Urdu, novel)
- Darya aur Kinaare, 1995 (Urdu, short stories)
- Dhai Akkhar, 1996 (Urdu)
- Garebaan Jhut Bolta Hai: Afsaney aur Afsance, 1996 (Urdu)
- Victoria, 1996 (Urdu, Hindi, translated, with Purnima Chawla)
- Album Yadon Ki, 2001 (Urdu, Hindi)
- Yaadein, 2001 (Hindi)
- Bhatke Hue Log, 1984, 2003 (Hindi)
- Fan or Shakhsiyat, 2003 (Urdu)
- Adrift, 2003 (English)

== Short Story Contributions ==
- Back to Ganges, in Roses in Snow - Poems and Lyrics of Immigrants in Norway, Sweden and Denmark edited by Khalid Salimi, 1988
- Between the Lines, in Contemporary Urdu Short Stories: An Anthology, selected and translated by Jai Ratan, 1991

== Honours and awards ==
- Rajinder Singh Bedi Award
- Uttar Pradesh Urdu Academy Award - 1976, 1981, 1991
- Zalaten Klas Bulgaria International Short Story Competition
- All India Meer Academy Award - 1981

== See also ==
List of Urdu language writers
