= Syed Ehtesham Zamir =

Pakistani general

Head of the internal wing of the Inter-Services Intelligence
- In office 11 September 2001 – 2002

Personal details
- Born: 1951 Chak Abdul Khaliq, Jhelum District, Punjab, Pakistan
- Died: 2015 (aged 63–64) Rawalpindi, Punjab, Pakistan
- Parent: Zamir Jafri (father)

Military service
- Branch/service: Pakistan Army
- Rank: Major general

Syed Ehtesham Zamir (1951–2015) was a Pakistani general who headed the internal wing of the Inter-Services Intelligence (ISI), including its political section, during the period preceding the 2002 Pakistani general election. In interviews in 2008, he said that the ISI had carried out what he called "political management" before the 2002 election in support of pro-Pervez Musharraf politicians and stated that such actions had been taken on Musharraf's directives.

== Early life and education ==
Zamir was born at Chak Abdul Khaliq in Jhelum. He was the son of the Urdu humorous poet Zamir Jafri. He studied at the Military College Jhelum and Gordon College.

== Career ==
Zamir took over the ISI's internal wing on 11 September 2001. The wing included the political desk, and he later said that the immediate task given to him was to ensure the victory of the PML-Q in the 2002 Pakistani general election.

In interviews in February 2008, Zamir acknowledged that the ISI had engaged in "political management" before the 2002 polls, including persuading "like-minded politicians" to support Musharraf. He said that such pre-election manipulation was not "purely constitutional" and also called for the closure of the ISI's political cell.

== Philanthropy ==
After retiring from the army, Zamir became associated with the Syed Zamir Jafri Foundation, which was established to preserve and promote his father's literary work and to undertake welfare activities.
