= Patras Kay Mazameen =

1927 collection of short stories by Patras Bokhari

- Author: Patras Bokhari
- Original title: پطرس کے مضامین
- Language: Urdu
- Genre: Essays
- Publication date: 1927
- Publication place: British India
- Media type: Print (paperback)

Patras Kay Mazameen is a collection of short stories by Patras Bokhari published in 1927. The book contains eleven humorous essays and is considered a milestone in the humour of Urdu literature.

== Synopsis ==
The eleven essays are a combination of humour and literary criticism in the style of social commentary. It is especially known for its humor which starts rights at the beginning of the book. Patras is known for writing informally. His essays create humor in simple daily life situations.

The books contains the following essays:

Original title	English translation
Hostel Mein Parhna (ہاسٹل میں پڑھنا)	Reading in hostel
Saveray Jo Kal Aankh Meri Khuli (سویرے جو کل آنکھ میری کھلی)	Yesterday Morning, as my eyes opened
Kuttay (کُتے)	Dogs
Urdu Ki Aakhri Kitab (اردو کی آخری کتاب)	The last book of Urdu
Mein Aik Miyan Hun (میں ایک میاں ہوں)	I am a husband
Murredpur Ka Pir	Pir of Mureedpur
Anjaam Bakhair (انجام بخیر)	Good luck
Cinema Ka Ishq (سنیما کا عشق)	Love for cinema
Mabel Aur Mein (میبل اور میں)	Mabel and I
Marhoom Ki Yaad Mein (مرحوم کی یاد میں)	In the memory of deceased
Lahore Ka Jugrafiya (لاہور کا جغرافیہ)	Geography of Lahore

== Background ==
The book contains eleven essays that were written in the early 1930s with others written in the 1920s during the author's stay at Government College, Lahore.
