= Malikzada Manzoor Ahmad =

Urdu poet, writer, critic and editor

Professor Malikzada Manzoor Ahmad
- Born: Malikzada Manzuur Ahmad; 17 October 1929; Uttar Pradesh, India
- Died: 22 April 2016 (aged 86); Lucknow, India
- Occupations: Poet, composer, compere, educationist, humorist
- Writing career
- Pen name: Manzoor
- Language: Urdu

Malikzada Manzoor Ahmad (born Malikzada Manzur Ahmad; 17 October 1929 – 22 April 2016) in Ambedkar Nagar (then in Faizabad district), Uttar Pradesh. He adopted the pen‑name "Manzoor". He was a celebrated Urdu poet, esteemed educator, and master compere of literary gatherings. Across his six‑decade career, he contributed significantly to Urdu literature through teaching, writing, editing, and hosting mushairas—garnering broad acclaim and inspiring generations in India and abroad.

Primarily known for compering mushairas in India and abroad and contributing to Urdu literature, he also compered the DCM mushaira, India–Pakistan poetry conference from 1952 to 2016. He also compered the India–Pakistan mushaira in Ambala and in the Red Fort.

== Biography ==
He was born as Malikzada Manzuur Ahmad in Ambedkar Nagar, Uttar Pradesh. He wrote novels, poetry and prose such as College Girl (1954 novel), Urdu Ka Mas’laa (1957 monograph), Shahr-e-Sukhan (1961 poetry), and Raqs-e-Sharar (2004 autobiography).

Early on, he showed literary aptitude, eventually earning postgraduate degrees in Urdu, History and English, followed by PhDs from Gorakhpur University.During his life many people have researched on him and earned MPhil and PHds degrees from Nagpur University, Jammu University and Gorakhpur University. Even today the research work continues, in several universities.

He also wrote numerous uncertain books such as autobiography and poetry, however his work was focused on research by scholarly topics related to Urdu poetry. He was awarded three PhD degrees by Jammu University, Nagpur University and Gorakhpur University. He was later awarded an MPhil degree by an uncertain university.

He served at various universities such as lecturer of history in Mahrajganj, Azamgarh, lecturer of English in Azamgarh and lecturer of Urdu in Gorakhpur University. He retired as professor of Urdu from Lucknow University.

He served as a president of Urdu Academy, Uttar Pradesh, chairman of government of Uttar Pradesh's Fakhruddin Ali Ahmad Memorial Committee, member executive council for the National Council for Promotion of Urdu Language besides serving as the member of Prasar Bharati and member executive council for Lucknow University among others.

He was the recipient of eighty uncertain awards in recognition of his contribution to Urdu literature.

== Academic and professional career ==
- Began as lecturer in history at Maharajganj, then lecturer in English in Azamgarh, followed by lecturer in Urdu at Gorakhpur University. Ultimately, he retired as lprofessor of Urdu at Lucknow University in 1989 after around 30 years of service.
- Was head of Urdu Department at Lucknow University and also served on university executive bodies, including the executive council of Lucknow University.

== Literary contributions and works ==
- Authored over a dozen influential works in prose and poetry, including:
  - College Girl (novel, 1954), Urdu Ka Mas’laa (1957 monograph), Shahr‑e‑Sukhan (poetry, 1961), Abul Kalam Azad: Fikr-o-Fan (1964), Shahr‑e‑Sitam (poetry), Raqs‑e‑Sharar (autobiography, 2004), and Intikhaab Ghazaliyaat Nazeer Akbarabadi (anthology).
- Wrote prefaces for over 200 books, contributing as an editor and critic across diverse publications.

== Mushaira compering and oratory ==
- Nicknamed the "King of Mushaira’s Nazmāt (compering)", he presided over many literary sessions from 1949 to 2016, not only in India but globally—in countries like the US, Canada, UAE, Oman, Qatar, Saudi Arabia, Bahrain, Iran, Nepal, and Pakistan.
- Hosted the renowned DCM Mushaira consistently from 1952 until 2016 (a span of 64 years), the India–Pakistan Mushaira at Ambala, and events at Delhi’s Red Fort (Lal Qila).
- His elegance and spontaneous wit earned admiration from celebrities such as Dilip Kumar, former Prime Ministers like Indira Gandhi and IK Gujral, and leaders in Pakistan and the international Urdu‑literary world.

== Institutional roles and honors ==
- Served as president of Uttar Pradesh Urdu Academy, president of Fakhruddin Ali Ahmad Memorial Committee, member of National Council for Promotion of Urdu Language, member of Prasar Bharati, and executive member of Lucknow University.
- Edited the monthly Urdu literary journal Imkaan, and led the All India Urdu Rabita Committee.

== Awards and recognition ==
- Honored with over 80 national and international awards—his age in years nearly matched the number of awards he received LUCKNOW.
- Major accolades include:
  - Uttar Pradesh Urdu Academy Awards (for lifetime contribution and for language promotion)
  - Madhya Pradesh Urdu Academy Award
  - Imtiaz‑e‑Meer and Iftikhar‑e‑Meer from the All India Meer Academy
  - Honors from Khuda Bakhsh Library (Patna), Maekash Akbarabadi Award, Harivansh Rai Bachchan Award, Sufi Jamal Akhtar Award, Firaq Samman, Momin Khan Momin Ghazal Award, Faqr‑e‑Urdu Award, and Sahitya Saraswat title.

== Legacy and death ==
- Widely regarded as the benchmark for literary compering, his life and works have become subjects of academic research, including multiple PhD and MPhil theses.
- He died on 22 April 2016 in Lucknow at age 86, leaving behind a rich legacy and large family, including six daughters and two sons, both of whom (Malikzada Javed and Parvez Malikzada) continue his tradition of compering and literary engagement
