= Nisar Ahmed Faruqi =

Indian Sufi Scholar

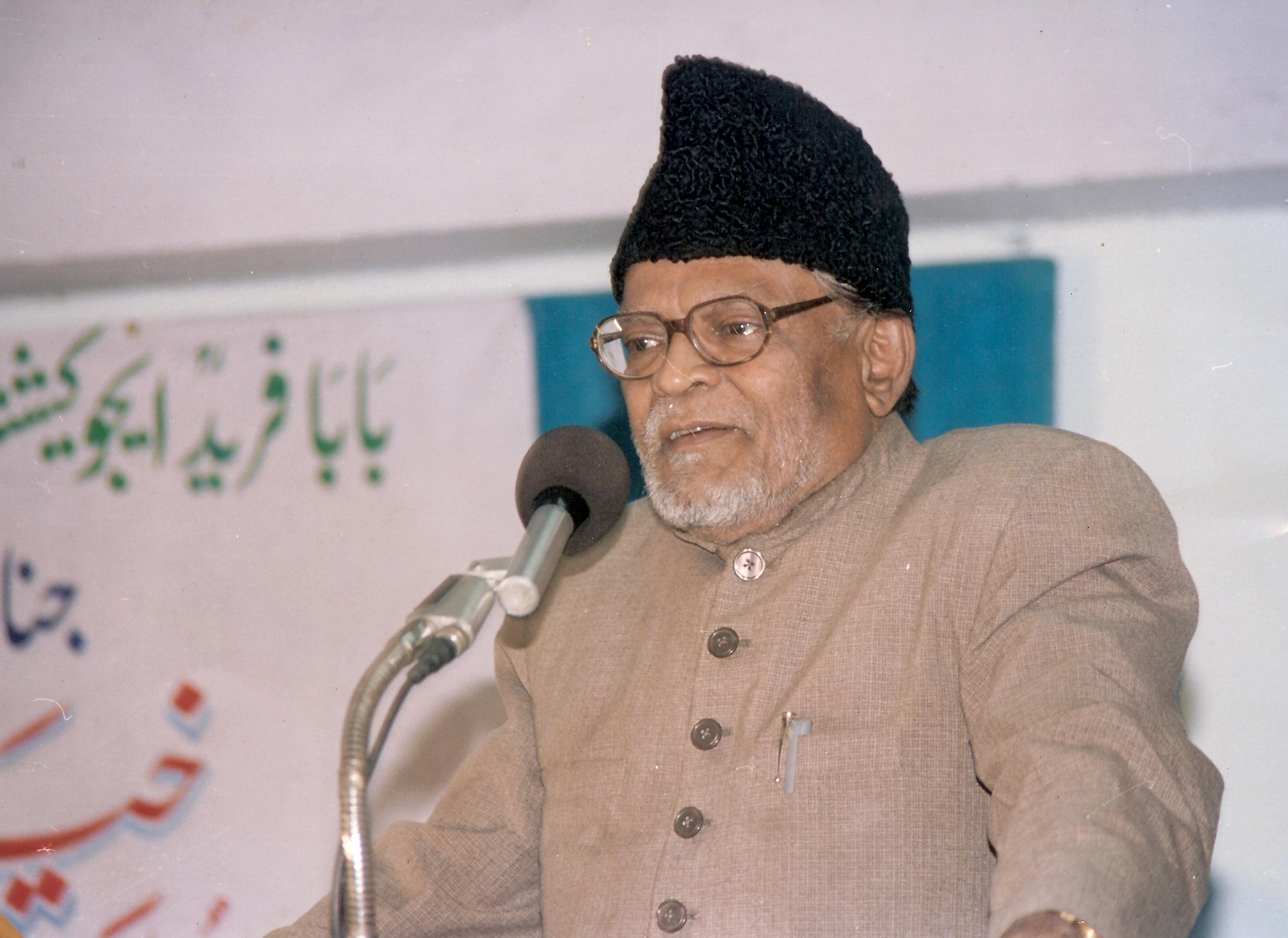
- Professor Nisar Ahmed Faruqi (1934–2004)
- Born: 29 June 1934; Amroha, United Provinces, British India
- Died: 28 November 2004 (aged 70); New Delhi, India
- Occupations: Former Professor and Head, Department of Arabic, University of Delhi
- Spouse: Razia Faruqi
- Writing career
- Language: Arabic, Persian, Urdu, English and Hindi
- Notable works: [Early Muslim Historiography, The Qur’an, The Hadith & The Sirah As The Sources of Islamic History New York 1997] [Mir Ki Aap Beeti 1957, Qiwam Ul Aqa’id 1994] and [Talash e Meer, [Talash e Ghalib, [Dirasat, [Deed O Daryaft, many more

Nisar Ahmed Faruqi (29 June 1934 – 28 November 2004) was an Indian scholar and authority on Sufism in South Asia, with over 50 works and 700 articles to his credit.

== Early life ==
Professor Nisar Ahmed Faruqi was born at Amroha in Uttar Pradesh, the son of Tasleem Ahmed Faruqi and Maimoona Khatoon. He was the eldest of three siblings. His family traces its lineage to the second caliph of Islam, Umar, through 41 links and to Baba Farid through 22 links.

== Education ==
He received his early education in Oriental languages and Islamic studies at home from his maternal grandfather and uncle. He later moved to Hyderabad and came back to Delhi after some months, then studied Urdu at Jamia Urdu, Aligarh. Later, he did his Masters in Arabic and a PhD on early Muslim historiography at the University of Delhi.

He then joined the university as a reader in modern Arabic and later became the Head of Department of Arabic. He retired from service in 2002. Faruqi received many awards during his lifetime and was acclaimed for his unique and deep knowledge of Arabic, Persian, Urdu, Hindi, English and Punjabi.

He received the President's Certificate of Honour from the late President of India Zail Singh in 1983.

== Employment ==
He was a lecturer at the University of Delhi 1964—1966 And then a lecturer in Arabic at Delhi College 1966—1977. He was a reader in Modern Arabic at University of Delhi 1977—1985 and became Professor and Head of Arabic Department, University of Delhi, 1985—2001.

== Achievements and awards ==
- Alami Farogh-e-Urdu Adab Award 2004, Doha (Qatar)
- Delhi Urdu Academy Award for Research (1982)
- Maulana Abul Kalam Azad Award by Uttar Pradesh Urdu Academy (1995)
- Qazi Abdul Wudood Award for Research by Bihar Urdu Academy
- Nuqoosh Award for Research (1987) Pakistan
- Maikash Akbarabadi Award, Agra
- Iftikhar-e-Mir Award, Mir Academy, Lucknow

== Family ==
Nisar Ahmed Faruqi had four children: two sons, Najmul Hadi and Nazrul Hadi, and two daughters Shumaysa and Basima. Nisar Ahmed Faruqi died on 28 November 2004 after a brief illness at the All India Institute of Medical Sciences, New Delhi. He is buried at his ancestral graveyard at Amroha Uttar Pradesh (India). His wife died on 6 June 2008 in Dehradun, Uttar Pradesh (India).

== Social work ==
Professor Nisar Ahmed Faruqi established two Urdu calligraphy training centers for boys and girls at Amroha sponsored by the National Council for Promotion of Urdu Language, followed by a computer training center and a graphic design training center.
