= Ayub Sabir =

Pakistani writer (born 1940)

Muhammad Ayub Sabir محمّد ایوب صابر
- Born: 2 January 1940; Haripur, Pakistan
- Died: 17 November 2022 (aged 82)
- Occupations: Writer, scholar, professor
- Known for: Research work in literature

Muhammad Ayub Sabir (Urdu: محمّد ایوب صابر) was a Pakistani writer and academic better known as a scholar of Muhammad Iqbal. He was awarded the Sitara-i-Imtiaz, Iqbal award and Pride of Performance by the Government of Pakistan for his literary works.

He died on 17 November 2022 in Islamabad.

== Early life and education ==
Sabir was born on 2 January 1940 in Haripur, NWFP, British India (now Khyber Pakhtunkhwa, Pakistan). He received his Master of Arts degree in Urdu language from Peshawar University, Peshawar, Pakistan. He obtained an M.Phil. degree in Iqbal studies from Allama Iqbal Open University, Islamabad and a PhD in Urdu language from Punjab University, Lahore.

He had three children, Faiza Khan, a daughter, and two sons, Fahd Ayub and Faiq Ayub. His wife Shirin Ayub is a painting artist.

He lived in Abbottabad and later in Islamabad.

== Academic career ==
Sabir researched on Iqbal studies, Urdu language and Islamic philosophy. He had thirty-two years (1963 to 1995) including sixteen years of teaching of post-graduate level at Government Post Graduate College Abbottabad and Allama Iqbal Open University, Islamabad, Pakistan. He served as the head of the department of Iqbal Studies at Allama Iqbal Open University, Islamabad from 2006 to 2008 and as chairman of the Department of Urdu at Government Post Graduate College Abbottabad from 1981 to 1986. He traveled to the United Kingdom for the study and research on Iqbal. He attended and been invited to many conferences in India.

== Books ==
His published books include:

=== Iqbal studies ===
- Iqbal Ki Shakhsiyat Par Etrazāt Ka Jaiza (Critique of Objections to Iqbal's Personality) – 2003

A rebuttal of critical claims against Allama Iqbal’s personality and ideas, based on scholarly review.

- Iqbal Dushmani: Ek Mutālā (Hostility Towards Iqbal: A Study) – 1993 (rev. ed. 2022)

Analyzes ideological and political opposition to Allama Iqbal, detailing the motives and arguments of his critics.

- Allāmah Iqbal Ka Tasawwur‑e‑Ijtihād (Allama Iqbal’s Concept of Ijtihad) – 2008

Discusses Iqbal’s approach to Islamic jurisprudence and renewal through independent reasoning (ijtihad).

- Mū’atrizeen‑e‑Iqbal (The Critics of Iqbal) – 2004

A critical study of intellectual opposition to Iqbal, engaging with contemporary and historical critiques.

- Iqbal Ka Urdu Kalām (Iqbal’s Urdu Works) – 2008

Explores Iqbal’s contributions to Urdu poetry and prose, highlighting his linguistic and thematic mastery.

=== Language and sociolinguistic studies ===
- Āzād Kashmir Mein Nifāz‑e‑Urdu (Implementation of Urdu in Azad Kashmir) – 1984

A sociolinguistic study of Urdu’s institutional role in the Azad Kashmir's education and administration.

- Pakistan Mein Urdu Ke Taraqqiyātī Idāre (Institutions Promoting Urdu in Pakistan) – 1985

Documents the evolution and function of Urdu-promoting institutions in Pakistan.

=== Literary surveys of the Hazara region ===
- Adabistān‑e‑Hazāra (The Literary Culture of Hazara) – 1989

A regional survey of Hazara’s literary heritage, with focus on Urdu and Pashto literary trends.

- Abbottābād Ke Ghazal‑go Shuarā (Ghazal Poets of Abbottabad) – 2000

An anthology edited by Sabir compiling Urdu ghazals of regional poets from Abbottabad.

=== Editorial and historical works ===
- Intikhāb‑i‑Khatūt‑e‑G̲h̲ālib (Selected Letters of Ghalib) – c.1998

Annotated selection of letters written by Ghalib, edited and introduced by Ayub Sabir.

- Urdu Ki Ibtidā Ke Bāre Mein Muḥaqqiqīn Ke Nazariyāt (Scholarly Theories on the Origins of Urdu) – c.2000

A historiographical analysis of scholarly views on the development and early history of Urdu.

== See also ==
- List of Pakistani writers
- List of Urdu language writers
