= Ahfazur Rahman =

Pakistani journalist (1942–2020)

Ahfaz-ur-Rahman احفاظُ الرّحمٰن
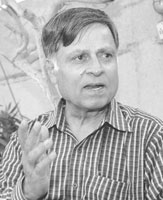
- Born: Ahfaz-ur-Rahman; 4 April 1942; Jabalpur, British India
- Died: 12 April 2020 (aged 78); Karachi, Pakistan
- Occupation: Journalist

Ahfaz-ur-Rahman (Urdu: احفاظُ الرّحمٰن ) (born 4 April 1942 – 12 April 2020), was a Pakistani journalist, writer and poet. He strived for the freedom of the press and for the rights of journalists under military dictatorships and even civilian governments.

Rahman was the author of many books including some on the journalist movement against the military dictatorship of Zia-ul-Haq in Pakistan, collections of articles on international dissidents, and collections of poetry. He also translated several books into Urdu. He died on 12 April 2020 in Karachi, Pakistan.

== Personal life ==
=== Background ===
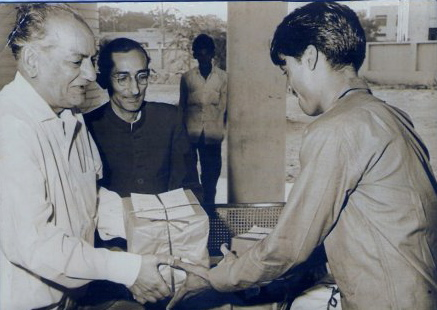
Rahman receiving the first prize from Faiz Ahmad Faiz in an Indo-Pak Youth Essay Writing Competition on Faiz

Rahman was born in Jabalpur, British India in 1942. Upon the partition of India, he along with his family migrated to Pakistan in 1947. During his secondary education, he won prizes for his writings. He was inspired by Sahir Ludhyanvi, Krishan Chander and other stalwarts of the Progressive Writers' Movement since his early years. He became a student leader of the left-wing student organization, National Students Federation (NSF) and took part in 1962 and 1964 student uprisings against General Ayub Khan's regime. In 1969, he went to work in the Foreign Languages Press in Beijing, China, during the Cultural Revolution.

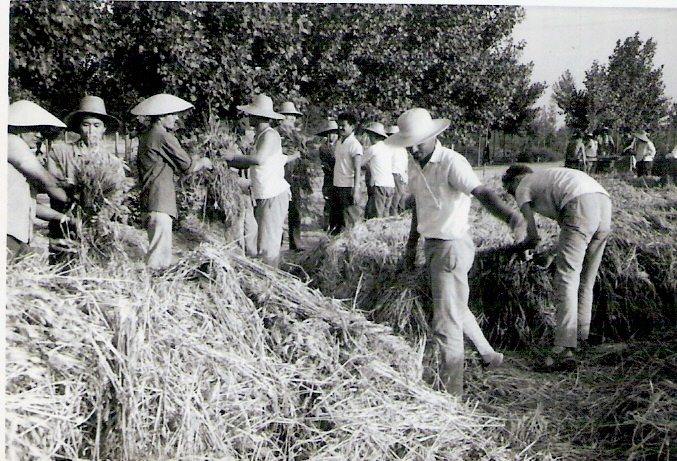
Rahman working alongside Chinese farmers in rural China, during the Cultural Revolution

=== Activism ===
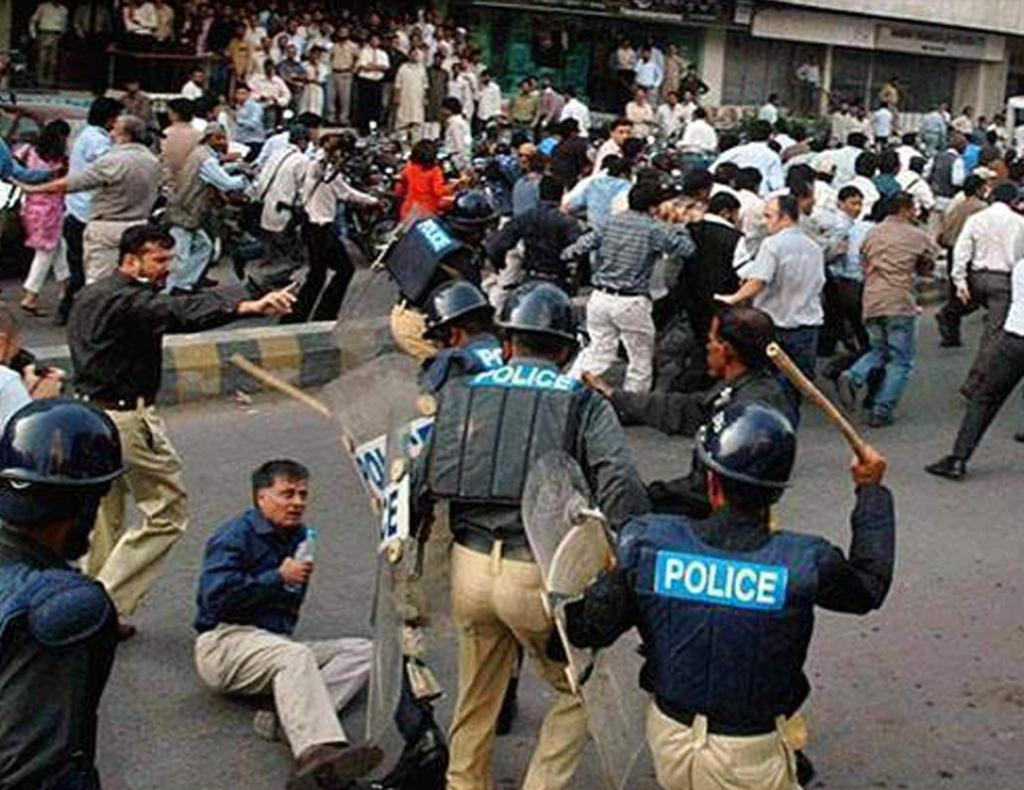
Rahman on the ground during protests against the Musharraf regime's decision to ban media channels in 2007

Rahman began his activism upon returning to Pakistan from China at the end of 1972. During the General Zia ul Haq's dictatorial regime, he organized the movement for the freedom of the press. He was one of the three journalists who went underground to continue the movement, and eventually also went to prison. The movement had started in 1977, when the Daily Musawaat in Karachi, a newspaper with Pakistan Peoples Party (PPP) leanings, was banned by General Zia's government.

In December 1977, journalists from all over the country came to Karachi to court arrest in batches. Rahman was the first journalist to be arrested in the first batch. From 30 April 1978 to 30 May 1978, more than 120 journalists who came from various cities to court arrest in Lahore were arrested and sent to different jails of the Punjab province. Rahman was again among the first to be arrested and sent to Camp Jail, Lahore. Later he was taken out of jail and barred from entering the Punjab province for six months.

In July 1978 journalists from all corners came to Karachi for courting arrest and were sent to different jails of the Sindh province. In the meantime, Rahman went underground to organize batches consisting of journalists, workers, peasants and student volunteers for court arrest.

After the movement ended, Rahman was blacklisted by all major newspapers and magazines. As a result, he faced economic difficulties due to a long period of unemployment. Finally in 1985, he found employment in the Foreign Language Press in Beijing China, for which he had worked sixteen years earlier.

== Journalistic career ==
After returning to Pakistan in 1993, with the Zia era over, Rahman joined Daily Jang, the largest selling Urdu newspaper in Pakistan, as the magazine editor. In 2002, he was elected unopposed President of the Pakistan Federal Union of Journalists (PFUJ), which is the sole representative body of Pakistani journalists.

As the president of the PFUJ he protested against the newspaper and media house owners for not giving the workers their due rights and for not implementing the Wage Board Award as had been directed by the Government. He was terminated from services for his outspoken activism. After yet another period of unemployment, Rahman found a job in the Urdu newspaper Daily Express. He also wrote a weekly column that appeared on Sundays in Daily Express, titled "Black and White" (Syaah o Safaid). In November 2007, Rahman was among the first journalists to be arrested during the protests against the Musharraf government's decision to ban several media channels. Rahman worked to "revitalize" the Karachi Press Club and "condemned the opportunist elements that were bent upon de-politicizing the vibrant club".

In February 2008, in what was a first in the history of Pakistani literature, four of his newly published books were launched at Arts Council Karachi on the same day in a well-attended ceremony that attracted people, including poets, writers, journalists, trade unionists and activists.

At the sixth International Urdu Conference that took place at the Karachi Arts Council in November 2013, a new collection of Rahman's poetry, titled Zinda Hai Zindagi ("Life, it is alive!") was launched. Leading poet and feminist Fehmida Riaz spoke on the occasion and said, "His poetry is an engaging account of our collective yearnings for what this nation has yet to achieve." Zahida Hina and Shamim Hanfi also spoke on the occasion, about Rahman's literary works. Senior writer and Man Booker International Prize nominee for 2013, Intizar Hussain in his review of the collection, opined that through his poetry Rahman is "searching for hope amid despair".

In 2015, Rahman wrote and compiled a book about the historic press freedom movement against the Zia-ul-Haq dictatorship. The book launching event was attended by the intellectual "creme de la creme" of Karachi. The book chronicles the movement for the freedom of the press by journalists in 1977-78 when journalists were incarcerated and flogged for their struggle for freedom of the press and unhindered information by then-president General Zia ul Haq and his coterie. Writing in Dawn's "Books and Authors", noted journalist Muhammad Ali Siddiqi, said that "the book is an important addition to the meagre literature available on the fourth estate in Pakistan".

=== In newspapers as ===
- Group Magazine Editor, Express 2005–2018
- Executive Editor Daily Amn, 2004–2005
- Group Magazine Editor, Daily Jang 1993–2003

=== Professional trade unionism ===
- Member Executive Council National Students Federation (NSF), Pakistan

== Memorial Award ==
In 2022 the Rahman family in collaboration with the Ahfaz ur Rahman Award Organizing Committee and the Karachi Arts Council, created the Ahfaz ur Rahman Award for Courage and Freedom of Expression. The list of jury members comprises distinguished intellectuals and activists, who will decide on the awardees each year.

In 2022, the lifetime achievement award was presented to Mr. Amar Jaleel, the writer and journalist for his writings in Sindhi, Urdu and English. The contemporary award was presented to the journalist Ms. Asma Shirazi who has garnered a positive reputation for her reporting and analysis.

== Selected bibliography ==
Poetry

- Zinda Hai Zindagi, a collection of poems

Journalism

- Jang Jari Rahegi, a collection or newspaper articles broadly on anti-imperialist and anti-war themes, including profile pieces on John Lennon, Bob Dylan, Justice Kiyani etc.

Historical

- Sab Say Bari Jang: A book about 1977-78 movement for Press Freedom.

Original Urdu Work

- 30 short stories in literary magazines

== See also ==
- List of Pakistani journalists
- List of Pakistani poets
- List of Pakistani writers
- List of Urdu poets
- List of Urdu writers
