= Tarique Ashraf =

Pakistani writer & publisher (1940–1992)

Tarique Ashraf (July 5, 1940 – April 14, 1992) was a Pakistani writer and publisher. He was the owner of Suhni Printing Press and editor-in-chief of Suhni Literary Magazine. His was the author of Urdu novels Meero Dharial and Jail Diary. Ashraf introduced Sindhi short story writer Amar Jaleel by publishing his stories. Ashraf published Suhni's special edition called Amar Jaleel Number to promote his work.

== Early life ==
Ashraf was born on July 5, 1940, in Hyderabad, Sindh, Pakistan. His birth name was Syed Ashraf Ali Shah. His father was Syed Lutuf Ali Shah and his mother was Bano Bibi. He attended school at Hyderabad and received a Master of Arts degree from University of Sindh.

== Career ==
His first story "Dari" (The Window) was published in the literary magazine Badal in 1960. His other early stories were published in Mehran, Rooh Rihan, and other Sindhi-language magazines. In 1960, Tarique Ashraf and his friend Ghulam Nabi Mughal founded a publishing house named "Idara-e-Adab-e-Nau" (Institute of Modern Literature), which published his own and other writers' literary works. The publishing house was later renamed as "Suhni Publications". At that time, only a few Sindhi language magazines were being published. He launched Suhni Magazine in 1966, which flourished under his editorship. Suhni Magazine introduced new writers, and published special editions featuring authors such as Amar Jaleel, Naseem Kharal and Shaikh Ayaz. Tarique was a revolutionary writer and wrote boldly against One Unit in Pakistan, the policies of Zulfiqar Ali Bhutto and General Zia-ul-Haq. He was jailed in 1975 for 22 months and again in 1983 for three months. While in jail he continued to write and publish.

== Books ==
His books include:

- Soonhan, Pathar and Piyar (Sindhi: سونهن، پٿر ۽ پيار), short stories (1964)
- Khiranda Khatanhar, (Sindhi: کڙندا کٽڻهار), short stories, (1968)
- Zindageea Jo Tanha Musafir (Sindhi: زندگيءَ جو تنها مسافر), short stories (1978)
- Darid Ja Deenhan, Dard Joon Ratiyoon (Sindhi: درد جا ڏينهن، درد جون راتيون), short stories (1982)
- Band Akhiun Men, Kujh Yadoon Kujh Sapna (Sindhi: بند اکين ۾ ڪجه يادون ڪجه سپنا ) (1992)
- Baweeha Mahina Jail Men (Sindhi: ٻاويھ مهينا جيل ۾) (Two Parts), Jail Diary
- Jail Gharium Jin San (Sindhi: جيل گهاريم جن سين)
- Adh Mulaqat (Sindhi: اڌ ملاقات)
- Meeru Dhareil (Sindhi: ميرو ڌاڙيل), Novel
- Akhiri Kitab (Sindhi: آخري ڪتاب), Collection of short stories of various authors.

== Death ==
Tarique Ashraf died on 14 April 1992 in Karachi.
