= Rashid Sabir =

Pakistani writer (1945-2012)

- رشيد صابر
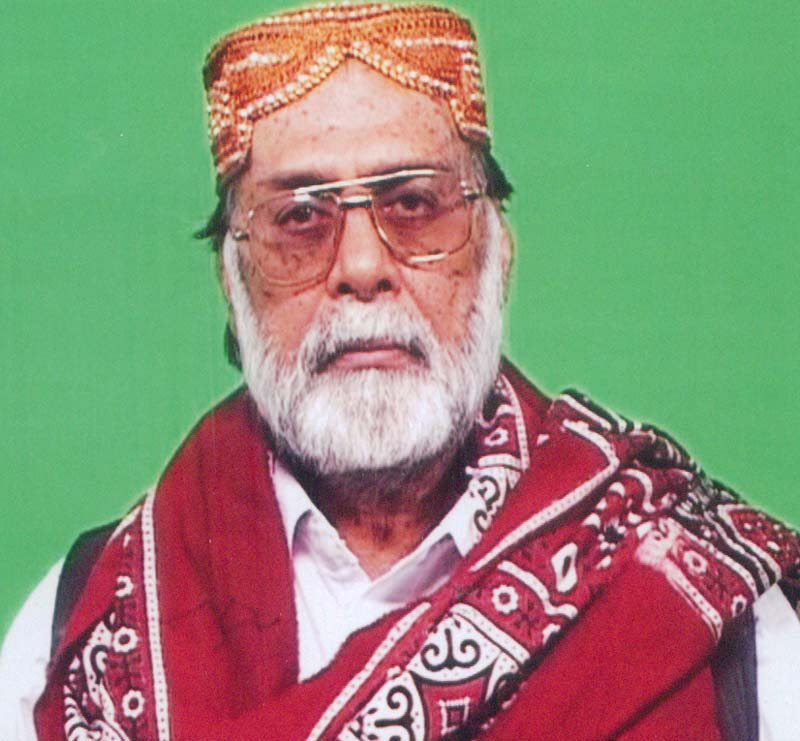
- Born: Abdul Rasheed; 10 January 1945; Jati, Sujawal District, Sindh, Pakistan
- Died: 7 December 2012 (aged 67); Karachi, Pakistan
- Education: Bachelor of Arts (BA) degree from the University of Sindh, Jamshoro, Pakistan
- Alma mater: University of Sindh
- Occupations: Poet, dramatist, teacher
- Writing career
- Notable works: 300 Dramas, Dialogues of 12 Films, Acting
- Notable awards: Writers Award by Radio Pakistan (2001 & 2002)

Rashid Sabir (Sindhi: رشيد صابر) (10 January 1945 – 7 December 2012) was a Pakistani teacher, film actor, TV, radio and stage artist. He wrote 300 dramas for Radio Pakistan and dialogues for 12 Sindhi language films. He also acted in a number of TV serials and plays.

== Childhood and career ==
Rashid Sabir was born Abdul Rasheed on 10 January 1945 to Abdullah Mendhro at village Manko (Sindhi: مڻڪو), Jati Taluka, District Thatta (now District Sujawal) Sindh, Pakistan. He passed the Moulvi Fazil examination and got B.A. degree from University of Sindh, Jamshoro. He started his career as a teacher at Noor Muhammad High School Hyderabad and retired in 1986.

== Contributions ==
Rashid Sabir began his literary activities by writing short stories. His first story was published in famous Sindhi language literary magazine Badal in 1962. Then he translated stories of the renowned writer Amar Jaleel in Urdu. He wrote his first Radio play "Manzil" which was recorded and produced by Syed Manzoor Naqvi from Radio Pakistan Hyderabad. Overall, he wrote about 300 plays both in Sindhi and Urdu for Radio Pakistan Hyderabad. He hosted a religious program on Radio Pakistan Hyderabad for about five years.

He was a famous dialogue writer. In this capacity, he wrote dialogues for 12 Sindhi Pakistani films including "Phul Macchi", "Toofan", "Ghatoo Ghar Na Aaya", "Tay Qaidi", "Ho Jamalo", "Barsat" and "Aakhiri Goli".

As an actor, he was introduced on Pakistan Television (PTV) Centre Karachi in 1975. His first PTV play as an actor was "Oondahia Men Laat" produced by Bedal Masroor. He also acted in "Marvi", "Kanhin Kanhin Manhooa Manjh" and other Sindhi and Urdu dramas and serials. He also acted in various serials of private channels of Pakistan. He acted in one Urdu film "Saharay" in which he played a role of a school teacher. As a writer, he wrote more than 35 plays and serials for Pakistan Television.

He was a great educationist, an expert in Arabic, and a poet. He authored the following books:

- Tareekh-e-Islam (History of Islam)
- Jadeed Arabi Grammar (Modern Arabic Grammar)

In poetry, his pen name was "Sabir". This pen name for him was suggested by the renowned writer and scholar Moulana Ghulam Muhammad Girami.

In recognition of his contributions, he received "Writers Award" in 2001 and 2002 from Radio Pakistan Hyderabad.

== Death ==
Rashid Sabir died on 7 December 2012 in Karachi. He left behind a widow, three sons and five daughters.
