= Ghulam Hassan Lobsang =

Ghulam Hassan Lobsang is recognized for his contribution to promoting Balti language and Balti culture in Baltistan, a region in the north of Pakistan. He was a government servant (now retired) in the Accounts Department but more active in the literary sphere of the region and is influential in promoting the region's local culture, tradition and language. Lobsang has primarily written reference texts and fictional material based on Baltistan's local traditions and culture. He is also known as "Keser Hassan".

== Work ==
The Bon Philosophy (1997) is recognized as Lobsang's major text. The book outlines religious and cultural changes in Baltistan over the past centuries and explores the impact of local belief systems on the lives of the region's inhabitants in the post-Islamic era.

Lobsang also authored Balti Language Grammar. This text was initially released in Urdu and Persian languages; however, it was subsequently translated into English and released under the title of Balti English Grammar by Bern University, Switzerland in 1995. This text is used as a key reference tool by students studying Balti language at Bern University.

== Publication ==
- Mimang Rgiastit (series)

1. *Lobsang 2. *Losar 3. *Kessar 4. *Yul Ann 5. *Sang

- Aot (A balti translation of quotations of great thinkers.)

== See also ==
- List of Pakistani writers
- Skardu District
- Geography of Gilgit–Baltistan
