= Rasheed Amjad =

Urdu writer, critic and scholar

- Born: 5 March 1940; Srinagar, Jammu and Kashmir, British India
- Died: 3 March 2021 (aged 80)
- Citizenship: Pakistani
- Occupations: Author of Urdu literature and short stories

Rasheed Amjad (Urdu: ڈاکٹر رشید امجد) was an Urdu fiction writer, critic and scholar. He was born on 5 March 1940 in Srinagar, and migrated to Pakistan after independence, He later lived in Rawalpindi, Pakistan.

He has received awards from Pakistan and India. He was also an editor of literary Urdu research magazines Daryaft and Takhilqui adab. His autobiography Aashiqi sabr talab was published in 2015.

== Books ==
Short stories

- Tamanna Betaab, Harf Academy, Rawalpindi, 2001–2003
- Kaghaz Ki Faseel, Dastawez Matbooat, Lahore, 1993
- Bezaar Adam Kay Baitay, Dastawez Publishers, Rawalpindi, 1974
- Rait Per Grift, Nadeem Publications, Rawalpindi, 1978
- Sehpehr Ki Khizan, Dastawez Publishers, Rawalpindi, 1980
- Pat Jhar Main Khudkalami, Asbaat Publications, Rawalpindi, 1984
- Bhagay Hay Biaban Mujhsay, Maqbool Academy, Lahore, 1988
- Dasht-e-Nazar Say Aagay, Maqbool Academy, Lahore, 1991
- Aks-e-Bay Khayal, Dastawez Matbooat, Lahore, 1993
- Dasht-e-Khwab, Maqbool Academy, Lahore, 1993
- Gumshuda Awaz Ki Dastak, Feroze Sons, Lahore, 1996
- Sat Rangay Prinday Kay Taaqub Main, Harf Academy, Rawalpindi, 2002
- Aik Aam Admi Ka Khwab, Harf Academy, Rawalpindi, 2006
- Aam Admi Kay Khwab, Poorab Academy, Islamabad, 2007

Research, criticism and editing

- Naya Adab, Tameer-e-Millat Publishers, Mandi Bahauddin, 1969
- Rawayyay Aur Shanakhtain, Maqbool Academy, Lahore, 1988
- Yaft-o-Daryaft, Maqbool Academy, Lahore, 1989
- Shairi Ki Siyasi-o-Fikri Riwayat, Dastawez Matbooat, Lahore, 1993
- Meerajee – Shakhsiat Aur Fan, Maghrabi Pakistan Academy, 1995
- Pakistani Adab Kay Memar (Meerajee), Pakistan Academy of Letters, Islamabad, 2006
- Pakistani Adab (6 Volume), F.G. Sir Syed College, Rawalpindi, 1980–1984
- Iqbal Fikr-o-Fan, Nadeem Publications, Rawalpindi, 1984
- Taleem Ki Nazriati Asas, Nadeem Publications, Rawalpindi, 1984
- Mirza Adeeb – Shakhsiat-o-Fan, Maqbool Academy, Lahore, 1991
- Pakistani Adab (Prose) 1990, Pakistan Academy of Letters, Islamabad, 1991
- Pakistani Adab (Prose & Fiction) 1991, Pakistan Academy of Letters, Islamabad, 1992
- Pakistani Adab (Prose & Fiction) 1994, Pakistan Academy of Letters, Islamabad, 1995
- Muzahmati Adab Urdu (1977–1985), Pakistan Academy of Letters, Islamabad
- Muzahmati Adab Urdu (1998–2008), Pakistan Academy of Letters, Islamabad, 2009
- Pakistani Adab (Afsana), (1947–2008), Pakistan Academy of Letters, Islamabad, 2009
- Pakistani Adab (Poetry), (1947–2008), Pakistan Academy of Letters, Islamabad, 2009
- Pakistani Adab (Rawaye aur Rujhanat) Poorab Academy, Islamabad, 2009
- Aashiqi sabr talab (Autobiography) "Saanjh Publications", Lahore, 2015 ISBN 978-969-593-145-5

== Journals edited ==
- Dastawez, Dastawez Publications, Rawalpindi
- Iqra, Federal Govt. Educational Directorate, GHQ, Rawalpindi
- Daryaft, National University of Modern Languages, Islamabad
- Takhliqi Adab, National University of Modern Languages, Islamabad

== Death ==
He died on 3 March 2021.
