= Qamar Siddiqui =

Pakistani poet

Qamar Siddiqui was one of Pakistan's most prominent twentieth century poets. Born in a highly educated and prominent family, he was a fourth child of Sir Abdul Qadir and Ahmedi Baigum.

Qamar Siddiqui was born as Sheikh Abdul Nazir Siddiqui.

== Sources ==
- (in Arabic)
