= Abasin Arts Council =

Art gallery and exhibition centre

Coordinates: 34.01251°N 71.56400°E

Abasin Arts Council (Pashto: د اباسین هنري شورا ) is an art gallery and exhibition centre in Peshawar, Pakistan. Council is located behind the Peshawar Museum.

== History ==
Abasin Arts Society was established in October 1955 by the Commissioner of Peshawar Division, Musarat Husain Zuberi. It was registered under the Societies Registration Act, 1880. In 1967 its name was changed to Abasin Arts Council. Council's present building was constructed later behind the Peshawar Museum.
