= Muhammad Khan (colonel) =

Pakistani army colonel and writer (1910–1999)

Colonel Muhammad Khan
- کرنل محمد خان
- Born: 1910; Chakwal, Punjab, British India (now Punjab, Pakistan)
- Died: 23 October 1999 (aged 88–89); Chakwal, Punjab, Pakistan
- Alma mater: Islamia College, Lahore
- Military career
- Allegiance: British India (1930–1947); Pakistan (1947–1972)
- Branch: (British Raj) British Indian Army; Pakistan Army
- Service years: 1930–1972
- Rank: Colonel
- Nickname: Colonel M. Khan
- Units: Indian Army Corps of Signals, Pakistan Army Education Corps
- Conflicts: Second World War; Indonesian National Revolution; Indo-Pakistani War of 1947; Indo-Pakistani War of 1965; Indo-Pakistani War of 1971
- Other work: Novelist and humorist

Muhammad Khan (1910 – 23 October 1999) was a Pakistani author and army officer. He also served in the British Indian Army during the British Raj and was a veteran of World War II. While serving in Pakistan Army, he wrote his first book Bajung Aamad (Urdu: بجنگ آمد) which was a humorous autobiography. This book became extremely popular and one of the most famous books in Urdu literature. The success of his first book earned him critically acclaimed prominence among Urdu humorists and he is considered one of the most influential authors of this genre, along with Mushtaq Ahmad Yusufi, Zamir Jafri, and Shafiq-ur-Rahman.

He is mostly known as Colonel Muhammad Khan to distinguish him from other bearers of this common name, despite his efforts to be recognised by his birth name. Later editions of his books show his name as just Muhammad Khan.

== Biography ==
He was born as Muhammad Khan in the village of Balkasar which is a part of the city of Chakwal. He studied in Islamia College, Lahore and when World War II broke out, he joined the British Indian Army. He served in Iraq, Egypt, Palestine and in the Western Desert during the Second World War, where he valorously fought against the Germans.

He rose to fame when he surprised the literary circles through his book Bajung Aamad. It was an autobiographical account of his life as a soldier in World War II. In 1974, he went on a tour of the UK and later published his account of the UK tour in Basalamat Ravi. Later he published another book, Bazam Arayan, a collection of semi autobiographical short stories.

== Books ==
- Bajang Aamad
- Basalamat Ravi
- Bazam Araiyan
- Badesi Mazah
- Tasneefat-e-Kernal Muhammad Khan
