= Bushra Rahman =

Pakistani politician (1944–2022)

Member of the National Assembly of Pakistan
- In office 2008–2013
- Constituency: Reserved seat for women
- In office 2002–2007
- Constituency: Reserved seat for women

Member of the Provincial Assembly of the Punjab
- In office 1988–1990
- Constituency: Reserved seat for women
- In office 1985–1988
- Constituency: Reserved seat for women

Bushra Rahman (Urdu: بشریٰ رحمٰن) (29 August 1944 – 7 February 2022) was a Pakistani author, novelist and politician who served as member of the National Assembly of Pakistan from 2002 to 2013. She remained a member of the Provincial Assembly of the Punjab from 1985 to 1990.

== Early life and education ==
Born in the British Raj and moved to Pakistan, Rahman earned the degrees of Bachelor of Education and Master of Arts.

She was a writer by profession.

== Awards and recognition ==
- Sitara-i-Imtiaz (Star of Excellence) award by the Government of Pakistan for her achievements in the literature field.

== Political career ==
Rahman was elected to the Provincial Assembly of the Punjab on a reserved seat for women in the 1985 Pakistani general election.

She was re-elected to the Provincial Assembly of the Punjab on a reserved seat for women in the 1988 Pakistani general election.

She was elected to the National Assembly of Pakistan as a candidate of Pakistan Muslim League (Q) on a seat reserved for women from Punjab in the 2002 Pakistani general election.

She was re-elected to the National Assembly of Pakistan as a candidate of Pakistan Muslim League (Q) on a seat reserved for women from Punjab in the 2008 Pakistani general election.

== Personal life and death ==
Rahman died on 7 February 2022, at the age of 77.

== Novels ==
- Allah Mian Ji
- Bahisht
- Barah e Raast
- But Shikan
- Chaand Say Na Khelo
- Chara Gar
- Chup
- Ek Aawara Ki Khatir
- Khubsurat
- Kis Morr Par Milay Ho
- Laazawal
- Lala Sehrai
- Lagan
- Pyaasi
- Sharmeely
- Tere Sung Dar Ki Talaash Thi
- Tuk Tuk Deedam Tokyo

== See also ==
- List of Pakistani writers
