= Tahir Naqvi =

Pakistani writer

Tahir Naqvi طاہر نقوی
- Born: Tahir Riza Naqvi; 1942 (age 83–84); British India
- Occupation: Writer
- Known for: Urdu short story and tv play writings.

Tahir Naqvi (Urdu: طاہر نقوی), born Tahir Riza Naqvi (Urdu: طاہر رضا نقوی), is a Pakistani writer. He has been writing short stories since 1972. Several of his short stories have been translated into English and some regional languages. He has been praised by several writers for his short stories.

== Biography ==
Naqvi was born in Dehradun, British India. His parents belonged to Bijnor which was a rich province of India for arts and literature. His parents migrated to Pakistan in 1947 and settled in Karachi.

He completed his MA degree in history in 1970 and Urdu Literature degree in 1972 from University of Karachi. He began writing stories from his school age which used to publish in daily papers and children magazines. His first "afsana" (short story) was published in " Afkar " a literary magazine in 1970. Thereafter, his afsanas have been published in other literary Urdu magazines in the US, London and Germany. His several afsanas have been translated into English, Sindhi, Balochi, Gormokhi, Hindi, Tamil and Saraiki language.

Naqvi was given literary awards for his 2 books "Band Labon Ki Chheekh" and "Dair Kabhi Nahein Hoti". He also published a literary magazine Rujhan. He is also a playwright, and his plays have been broadcast by Radio Pakistan. He has contributed a daily column in different newspaper of Karachi and many articles on various subjects in Daily Jang Karachi and other leading papers.

His various short stories were appreciated by the critics of fiction and the readers.

=== Awards ===
- Aadam Ji Adabi Inam, Karachi (Aadam Ji Literary Award, Karachi).
- Aasar-o-Afkaar Academy, Karachi.

== Bibliography ==
- Band labon ki cheekh- 1982(بند لبوں کی چیخ )
- Habs k baad pehly barish- 1989( حبس کے بعد پہلی بارش )
- Shaam ka parinda- 1998(شام کا پرندہ )
- Dair kabhi nahein hoti- 2005( دیر کبھی نہیں ہوتی )
- Kawwon Ki Basti Mein Aik Aadmi- 2011 ( کوّوں کی بستی میں ایک آدمی )

Short stories

- Aankhon se gira khaab (آنکھوں سے گرا خواب)
- Afsana nigar ki apnay kirdar se aakhri mulaqaat( افسانہ نگار کی اپنے کردار سے آخری ملاقات)
- Ubaal ( اُبال)
- Ajnabi ( اجنبی)
- Mas'ala ( مسئلہ )
- Aazmaesh ( آزمائیش )
- Shor ( شور )
- Bay Ghar (بے گھر)

== See also ==
- List of Pakistani writers
