= Fikr Taunsvi =

Fikr Taunsvi real name Ram Lal Bhatia (7 October 1918 – 12 September 1987) was an Urdu poet, born in a village of Taunsa Sharif, now part of Pakistan. He was famous for his satires and was a Hindu by religion. He wrote twenty books in Urdu and eight in Hindi.

== Personal life ==
His father, Dhanpat Rai, was a shopkeeper in the Baloch tribal area of Taunsa Sharif. His village was Mangrotha which is about 04 km from Taunsa Sharif. Taunsvi married Shrimati Kailashwati, in 1944. He has three children Rani, Phool Kumar and Suman.

He studied up to higher secondary school at Taunsa Sharif and received higher education from Lahore. He migrated to Delhi after the partition of India. His favorite city was Lahore which according to him was attached to his soul. The decision of partition dejected him a lot.

He died on 12 September 1987.

== His works ==
He wrote many books, and the daily column Pyaz ke Chhilke in Urdu Milap for about 27 years. His journal written during the partition of India, Chhata Darya (published in Lahore in 1948), has been translated into English by Dr Maaz Bin Bilal as The Sixth River: A Journal from the Partition of India (published by Speaking Tiger Press in 2019).

In the late 80s there was a TV show on Doordarshan on called Fikr Ne Kaha starring Tiku Talsania.

== Recognition ==
He was awarded with Soviet Land Nehru award.
