= Mohsin Mighiana =

Pakistani physician, writer, columnist and humorist

Mohsin Maghiana (Urdu: محسن مگھیانہ; born 1956) is a Pakistani physician, writer, columnist and humorist. He is mostly recognized by his literary and humorous works.

He took his medical degree from Faisalabad Medical University in 1981. Since then he has worked in many different medical institutes and hospitals around Punjab. He has unsuccessfully tried to pass Foreign Medical Graduate Examination in Medical Sciences in United States. He took his master's degree in surgery in 1988 after a few unsuccessful attempts.

== Bibliography ==
- Making of a Chief Surgeon
