= Zamir Jafri =

Pakistani poet (1916–1999)

Syed Zamir Jafri
- Born: Zamir Hussain; January 1, 1916; Jhelum, British India
- Died: 12 May 1999 (aged 83); Bay Shore, New York (Buried in Pakistan)
- Education: Islamia College, Lahore
- Occupation: poet
- Spouse: Jahanara Jafri
- Children: Syed Imtanan Zamir and Syed Ehtesham Zamir
- Writing career
- Genre: Humorous poetry
- Notable awards: Pride of Performance award by the President of Pakistan in 1984; Presidential Iqbal Award for his Urdu poetry in 2001; Tamgha-e-Quaid-e-Azam (Medal of the Great Leader) in 1967

Syed Zamir Jafri (1 January 1916 – 12 May 1999) was a Pakistani poet, humorist, columnist, and a former military person, known for his contribution to Urdu humorous poetry.

He was also a noted Pakistani civil servant and an officer in the Pakistan Armed Forces.

== Early life ==
He was born in Chak Abdul Khaliq, Jhelum, British India (now in Punjab, Pakistan). He was the father of professional cricketer Syed Imtanan Zamir and General Syed Ehtesham Zamir, who served as the head of the Inter-Services Intelligence (ISI)'s political cell.

== Career ==
Jafri was assigned to the Far East during his service in the Pakistan Army Education Corps, where he also took part in the Indo-Pakistani War of 1947–1948 and 1965. He retired from the army with the rank of major in 1965.

Following his retirement, he became the first director of Public Relations at the Capital Development Authority (CDA), the organization responsible for planning and developing Islamabad, Pakistan's newly designated capital. During his tenure of over fifteen years, he played a central role in the naming of the city's roads, residential sectors, and commercial areas.

Subsequently, Jafri held several government and advisory positions, including deputy director-general of the Pakistan National Centre in the Ministry of Information, advisor to the chief commissioner for Afghan Refugees, and chief editor at the Pakistan Academy of Letters.

== Poetry ==
Jafri gained popularity for his satirical and humorous verse, as well as his columns in newspapers and periodicals. Over the course of his career, he authored 78 books of poetry and prose, including Aag Ik Tarah, Sar Goshian, Meray Pyar ki Zameen, Musadas Badhali, Nishan-e-Manzil, Bhanwar aur Badban, Ras Mela, Zameeriat, Zameer Zaviye, Mafi-ul-Zameer, Pehchan Ka Lamha, and Zameer Hazir Zameer Ghaib, written in Urdu, Punjabi, and English representing various literary expression.

Jafri's works are noted for blending humor with social commentary, making him one of the leading figures in modern Urdu humorous literature.

== Awards and recognition ==
- Pride of Performance award by the President of Pakistan in 1984.
- Presidential Iqbal Award awarded to Syed Zamir Jafri for his Urdu poetry in 2001.
- Tamgha-e-Quaid-e-Azam (Medal of the Great Leader) by the Government of Pakistan in 1967

== Death ==
Syed Zamir Jafri died on 12 May 1999, in Bay Shore, New York, and was laid to rest in his hometown of Jhelum, Pakistan.

Among others, Pakistan's noted Urdu scholars Ahmad Nadeem Qasmi and Ashfaq Ahmed condoled his loss upon his death.

== See also ==
- Zamir Jaffri Cricket Stadium
