= Muhammad Siddique Memon =

Pakistani educationist, writer (1890–1958)

Khan Bahadur Muhammad Siddique Memon خانبهادر محمد صديق ميمڻ
- Born: 30 March 1890; Hyderabad, Bombay Presidency, British India
- Died: 20 November 1958 (aged 68); Hyderabad, Sindh, Pakistan
- Education: Aligarh Muslim University
- Occupations: Writer, teacher
- Writing career
- Notable works: Founder of Madersatul Banat Girls School; Author of more than 15 books
- Notable awards: Khan Sahib, Khan Bahadur

Khan Bahadur Muhammad Siddique Memon (Sindhi: خانبهادر محمد صديق ميمڻ; March 30, 1890 – November 20, 1958) was a Sindhi educationist, writer and social leader of Hyderabad, Sindh. He established "Madrasatul Banat" the first school for Sindhi Muslim girls in Hyderabad. The founder of Sindhi Muslim Literary Society and Sindhi Muslim Printing Press, Memon authored more than 15 books, including some textbooks. He served as the principal of Training College for Men, Hyderabad from 1940 to 1947. He was bestowed the title of Khan Sahib and Khan Bahadur by the Viceroy of British India.

== Childhood and education ==
Muhammad Siddique Memon was born in Hyderabad, Sindh on 30 March 1890 to Muhammad Yousuf Memon. He received his early education from Hyderabad and graduated from Aligarh Muslim University.

== Contributions ==
Muhammad Siddique Memon founded Sindhi Muslim Literary Society in Hyderabad in January 1931. He served as Secretary and then President of this society. The purpose of this society was to promote Sindhi literature and organize literary activities. To achieve these objectives, he founded Sindhi Muslim Printing Press to publish literary books. He published a number of books from this press. From the platform of this society, he established the first Sindhi school for Muslim girls of Hyderabad, named Madrasatul Banat (Sindhi: مدرسته البنات). This is one of the most popular girls schools of Hyderabad. This school was opened on 1 April 1940. The foundation stone of the school was laid by Makhdoom Ghulam Hyder Siddiqui on 25 August 1940 and the chief guest was G.M. Syed, the then Education Minister of Sindh. In 1953, Muslim Girls Arts and Science College was also established with his efforts.

He authored more than 15 books including the following:

- Tin Deenhan Ji Badshahi ya Hareea ji Hukumat (The kingdom of three days or the Peasant Government), 1932. (Sindhi: ٽن ڏينھن جي بادشاھي يا ھاريءَ جي حڪومت)
- Adabi Tuhifo (A Literary Gift), 1932. (Sindhi: ادبي تحفو)
- Sindhi Ji Adabi Tareekh (History of Sindhi Literature) – two volumes,، 1937 & 1938. (Sindhi: سنڌ جي ادبي تاريخ)
- Islami Nizam-e-Taileem (Islamic System of Education),1940. (Sindhi: اسلامي نظام تعليم)
- Sachai aeen Himat (Truth and Harmony), 1943. (Sindhi: سچائي ۽ ھمت)
- Khilafat-e- Rashdiya, 1944. (Sindhi: خلافت راشديہ)
- Angi Hisab (A textbook of Mathematics), 1947. (Sindhi: انگي حساب)
- Beglar Namu (Translation from Persian), 1947. (Sindhi: بيگلار نامو)
- Pakistan Ji Tareekh (History of Pakistan). (Sindhi: پاڪستان جي تاريخ)
- Sindh Ji Tareekh (History of Sindh). (Sindhi: سنڌ جي تاريخ)
- Taileemi Nafsiyat (Educational Psychology). (Sindhi: تعليمي نفسيات)
- Mazmoon Naveesi (Essay Writing). (Sindhi: مضمون نويسي)
- Kamil Rahanma (The Perfect Leader), 1949. (Sindhi: ڪامل رھنما)
- Deewan-e-Sangi, 1951
- England Ji Tareekh (History of England), 1951. (Sindhi: انگلينڊ جي تاريخ)
- Risalo Shah Abdul Latif Bhitai, 1951. (Sindhi: رسالو شاھ عبداللطيف ڀٽائي)
- Geometry (Sindhi: جاميٽري)

He was a famous teacher and expert of elementary Mathematics and Geometry. His books "Angi Hisab" (Mathematics) and "Geometry" were part of school curriculum for many years. He served as Principal of Training College for Men Hyderabad from 1940 to 1947.

He was nominated as a member of Central Advisory Board for Sindhi Literature by Sindh Government in 1941.

== Awards ==
In recognition of his services for promotion of education and social work, he was bestowed upon with the title of "Khan Sahib" and then "Khan Bahadur" (1946) by the Viceroy of British India.

== Death ==
He died on 20 November 1958 in Hyderabad, Sindh, Pakistan.
