= Abdal Bela =

Pakistani Urdu-language novelist and military physician (1956–2024)

- Born: 14 December 1956; Sialkot, Punjab, Pakistan
- Died: December 22, 2024 (aged 68); Islamabad, Pakistan
- Occupations: Novelist, short story writer, physician, military officer
- Writing career
- Language: Urdu
- Period: 1979–2024
- Genres: Fiction, novel, Sufi literature, travel writing, short story
- Notable works: Darwaza Khulta Hai (2006); Aaqa (2015)

Abdal Bela (14 December 1956 – 22 December 2024) was a Pakistani Urdu-language novelist and short story writer, and a retired colonel of the Pakistan Army. He is known primarily for the novel Darwaza Khulta Hai and the biographical work Aaqa, both published by Sang-e-Meel Publications in Lahore.

== Early life and education ==
Bela was born on 14 December 1956 in Sialkot, Punjab, Pakistan. His father, Chaudhry Fazal Din, was among the families who migrated from Ludhiana in British India and settled in Lahore following the Partition of India in 1947. Bela completed his schooling and college education in Lahore, studying at Government College Lahore before graduating with an MBBS degree from Punjab Medical College in Faisalabad. In 1997, he obtained an MSc in Hospital Administration from Quaid-i-Azam University, Islamabad.

== Military career ==
Following his medical qualification, Bela was commissioned as a captain in the Pakistan Army Medical Corps. During his service he also held postings in the Saudi Arabian army and the Pakistan Navy. He retired from the Pakistan Army in 2007 at the rank of colonel, having served in his final posting as Deputy Director of the Inter-Services Public Relations (ISPR).

== Literary career ==
Bela began publishing fiction in 1979, with his debut work Anhoniyan appearing that year. Over the following decades he published across multiple genres, including the novel, short story, travel writing, and Sufi literature, with a recurring interest in Pakistani history and Islamic biography.

Bela was identified as a figure within the Lahore literary scene in a 2001.

=== Notable works ===
Darwaza Khulta Hai (دروازہ کھلتا ہے; lit. The Door Opens) is an Urdu novel, published by Sang-e-Meel Publications in 2006 (ISBN 978-969-35-1812-2).

Aaqa (آقاﷺ; Seerat-e-Pak) is a Urdu-language biography of the Prophet Muhammad, published by Sang-e-Meel Publications in 2015 (ISBN 978-969-35-2825-1).
