= Kanhaiya Lal Kapoor =

Urdu satirist (27June 1910 – 5 May 1980)

Kanhaiyalal Kapoor
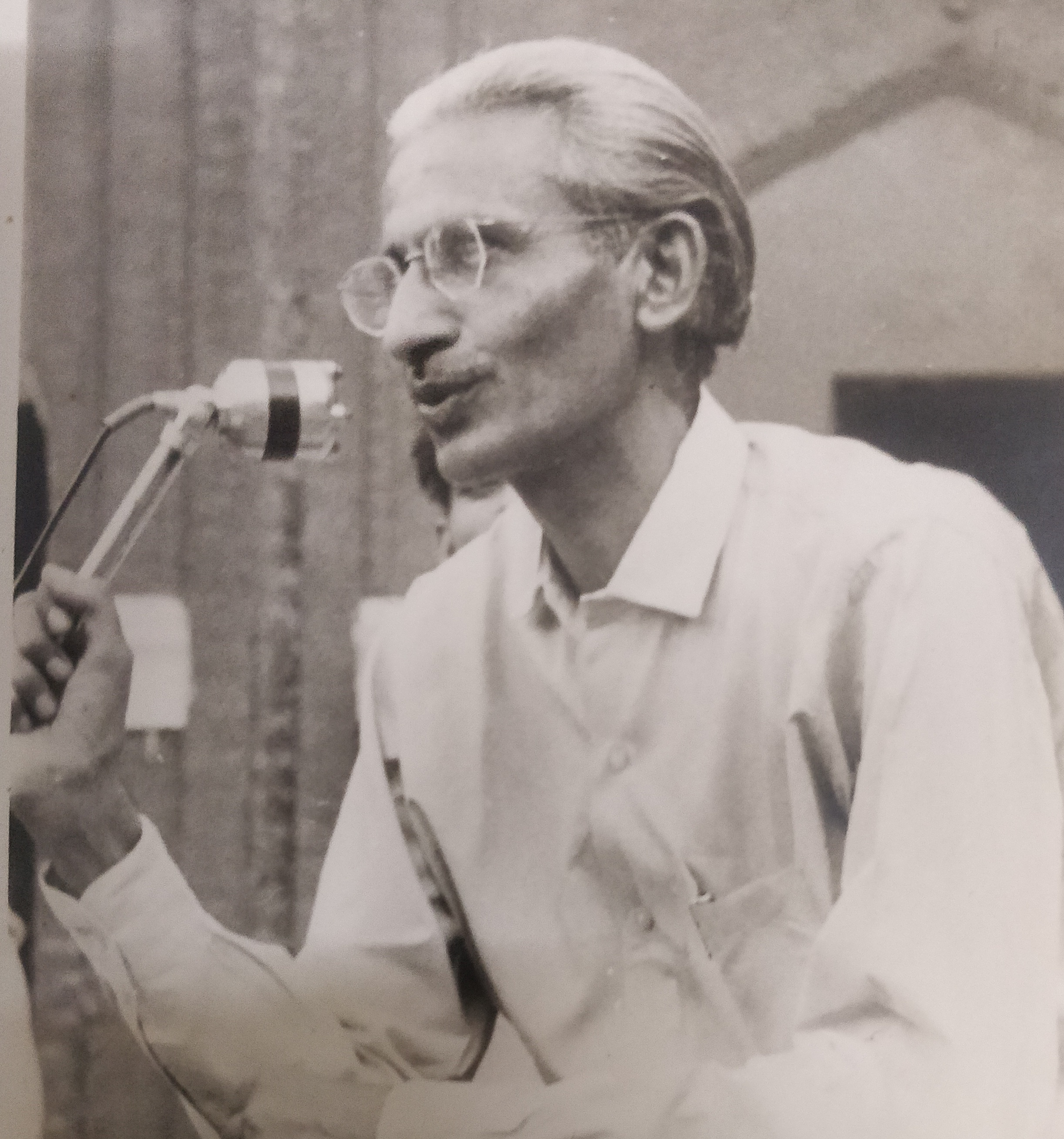
- Urdu, Punjabi Humor and Satarist
- Born: 27 June 1910; Lyallpur, Punjab, British India
- Died: 5 May 1980 (aged 69); Poona Maharashtra
- Occupations: Writer, lecturer, Principal
- Spouse: Pushpavati Kapoor
- Children: 7

Kanhaiyalal Kapoor (June 27, 1910 – 5 May 1980), also known as K.L Kapur, was an Urdu satirist known for his sharp wit, ironical style and derisive parodies. He was renowned for his unique writing style and as a result he was awarded the Ghalib award in the year 1974 by then President of India Dr. Fakhruddin Ali Ahmed for his contributions to Urdu literature.

== Biography ==
=== Early life ===
Kapoor was born in undivided India in Lyallpur (now Faisalabad), part of Pakistan. He finished his primary education in a local school where he was given a chance to learn the Persian language. He completed his metric from Kamalia government school in 1928. He completed his Bachelor of Arts from DAV college Lahore. There he was found to be excellent in English and Sanskrit and he chose English for his Master of Arts, which he completed in the year 1934. He married Srimati Pushpavati in the year 1931, during his M.A.

=== Expanded description ===
During his admission in Master of Arts he was interviewed by Patras Bokhari, one of the foremost humorists of Urdu and on seeing him he said "Are you normally this tall or you have made special arrangement for this interview?" since he was 6.5 feet tall.

Patras Bokhari was impressed by Kapoor's wit and humor and encouraged him to write in Urdu. Kapoor was strongly affected by Krishan Chander's writing, and was ecstatic knowing that they happen to share same hostel. Influenced by all these remarkably renowned literary scholars, Kapoor started writing Urdu satires. In fact his first parody was on Krishan Chanders Yarkan, which was appreciated by Krishan Chander but Kapoor never published it.

Before partition he worked as a lecturer in D.A.V college Lahore from 1934 to 1947. After partition, he left Lahore, migrated to Ferozpur and then to Moga in Punjab where he was appointed as lecturer in 1947 and retired as a principal of DM College in Moga. He served as a principal from 1964 to 1973. He was also a founding member and principal of AD College in Dharamkot(Moga) from 1973 to 1975 before he moved to Jalhandhar in 1978 and then Poona from 1979 to 1980. He continued his writings in the form of Urdu satire and writing columns in Punjab Kesari and Hind Samachar.

Some of his notable parodies include 'Ghalib Jadeed Shoara Ki Ek Majlis Mein' (‘Ghalib in an Assembly of Modern Poets’) and his Saleem ki bhagavat (Satire on romance between Anarkali and Prince Saleem.)

Some of his other works in Urdu include: Sango-o-Kisht (1942), Chang-o-rubab (1944), Sheesha-o-teesha (1946), Nae-Shugoofay (1988), Bal-o-par (1954), Gard-eKarwan (1960), and Gustakhiyan (1965). A collection of his Urdu books can be found on Rekhta. His notable comedy Hindi books include Hasya-chalisa (1966) and Commorade Sheikh Chilli (1968).

Some of his Punjabi books include Dekh kabira roya (1973), Bhul-Chuk (1967), Moge Di Muskaan and Til-Phul(1964).

=== Death and afterward ===
K.L Kapoor died in Poona, Maharashtra India following a cardiac arrest on 5 May 1980. His teachings are still included in many universities' curricula (e.g. Master of Arts in Urdu Mumbai University and Delhi University) Many of his works are also being revisited at this time.

== Awards and accolades ==
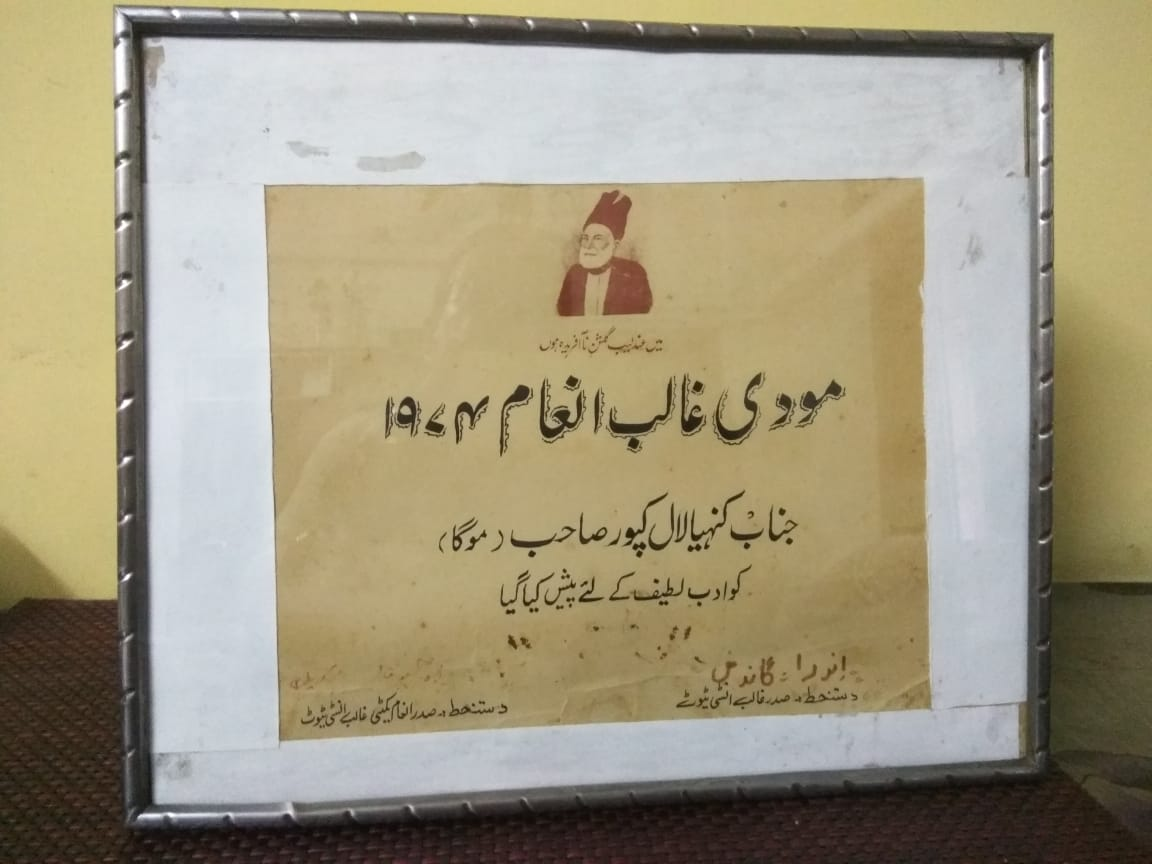
Ghalib Award Certificate presented to K.L. Kapoor by Dr Fakhruddin Ahmed then President of India.

- Honored by Ghalib Award in the year 1974 (Refer Certificate below).
- Bhasha Vibhaag (Govt of Punjab) has also an award dedicated in his name, known as kanhaiya lal Kapoor in honour of him. This is an award for Urdu books written and published in Punjab.
- K.L Kapoor park in Moga honour of him in year 1982.

== Biographies and Books on K.L Kapoor ==
- Kanhayya-lal-kapoor-Hayat-O-Khidmat by Dr Nazim Nihal
- Kapoor Nama by Dr Haroon Usmani.
- Urdu-tanz-o-mizah-ka-krishn-kanhaya:kanhaya-lal-kapoor by Dr Haroon Usmani
- kanhayya lal kapoor hayat aur karname by S. J. Sadiq

Burj bano
