= Patras Bokhari =

Pakistani diplomat (1898–1958)

HI Patras Bokhari

Permanent Representative of Pakistan to the United Nations
- In office 1951–1954

Presidency of the United Nations Security Council
- In office 1 April 1952 – 30 April 1952

Presidency of the United Nations Security Council
- In office 1 March 1953 – 31 March 1953

Personal details
- Born: Pir Syed Ahmed Shah Bokhari; 25 October 1898 Peshawar, NWFP, British India (now in Khyber Pakhtunkhwa, Pakistan)
- Died: 5 December 1958 (aged 60) New York City, United States
- Citizenship: Pakistan
- Spouse: Zubaida Wanchoo (m. 1923)
- Children: 3
- Education: Government College University, Lahore; Emmanuel College, Cambridge
- Occupation: Diplomat writer professor broadcaster
- Awards: Hilal-e-Imtiaz (Crescent of Excellence) Award (posthumously awarded in 2004) by the President of Pakistan

Pir Syed Ahmed Shah Bokhari (Urdu: پیر سید احمد شاہ پطرس بخاری), commonly known as Patras Bokhari (25 October 1898 – 5 December 1958), was a Pakistani writer, humorist, broadcaster and diplomat who served as a Permanent Representative of Pakistan to the United Nations.

== Life ==
Patras was born as Syed Ahmed Shah Bokhari on 1 October 1898 in Peshawar, North-West Frontier Province of British India, to a Kashmiri father, who had migrated from Baramula, northern Kashmir in the 19th century and a Hindkowan mother. His Syed ancestors had migrated to Kashmir from Bukhara, Uzbekistan. His native language was Hindko .

Shah studied at Edwardes Mission School in Peshawar and moved to Lahore, where he studied English literature at the Government College. Shah moved to the United Kingdom where he received his Tripos from the Emmanuel College, Cambridge. He returned to Lahore where he taught English at Government College in 1927. He became a prominent part of the Muslim intelligentsia in South Asia. Shah moved to eventually become Director General of All India Radio in Delhi and then Principal of Government College. He was appointed as the country's envoy to the UN in New York City from 1951 to 1954, followed by the Under-Secretary-General of the United Nations for Information until 1958.

After completing his Master of Arts degree in English, he was appointed as a lecturer at the same institution. In 1922, he took his MA in English after just one year's study and stood first, after which he was appointed lecturer. This was his creative period. His bilingual excellence is owed to his intensive translation of great books and plays from English into Urdu. He was tall and blue-eyed, had a razor-sharp mind, an equally sharp tongue, and a keenness to move forward in life. Patras' s brother Zulfiqar Ali Bukhari was a noted broadcaster in Pakistan.

Bokhari left his position at Government College, Lahore, before moving to England from India in 1925 to complete a Tripos in English at Emmanuel College, Cambridge. Many years later, the Bokhari English Prize was established there in his honor. In 1927, he returned to Government College, Lahore, and, as a professor remained there until 1939.

Before the independence of Pakistan in 1947, he was the Director general of All India Radio. Being a professor of English Literature, he also served as the Principal of Government College, Lahore, from 1947 to 1950. The Urdu poets Faiz Ahmed Faiz, Noon Meem Rashid and Kanhaiyalal Kapoor were among his students.

He was a member of Prime Minister Liaquat Ali Khan's delegation during his visit to the United States in 1950. He drafted the prime minister's speeches and public pronouncements. These have been published in a volume entitled Heart of Asia. It was his close association with Liaquat Ali Khan, that culminated in his posting as Pakistan's permanent representative at the United Nations (1951-1954). From 1954 to 1958, he served as the Undersecretary of the UN, Head of Information.

In New York, Bokhari lived in a small house on a small street along the East River. He used four languages at home: the local dialect, Persian, Urdu and Pashto.

== Background to Pen Name Patras ==
Ahmed Shah Bokhari first started using a pen name Peter, in respect of his teacher, Peter Watkins, when he wrote in English. In his Urdu writings, he used the pen name Patras.

According to Khaled Ahmed, The House of Patras which appeared in The Friday Times, Lahore, on 13 May 1999, Patras is a Persian adaptation of an Arabic rendering of 'Peter'.

An extract from Bokhari's brother's autobiography about the origin of ASB's pen name is:

"My brother's full name was Pir Syed Ahmed Shah Bokhari. Our headmaster (in Peshawar) Mr. Watkins addressed him by his first name ‘Pir’ but pronounced it as ‘Pierre’, as if it were a French word. Pierre in French stands for Peter, which is Patras in Greek.... As a result of this similarity, my brother took up ‘Patras’ as his pen name".

== Contributions ==
His collection of essays, Patras Kay Mazameen (پطرس کے مضامین) published in 1927, is said to be an asset in Urdu humor, writing. It is undoubtedly one of the finest works in Urdu humor, and despite the fact that it was written in the first half of twentieth century, it seems to be truly applicable even today. He lived in a times of personalities like Allama Iqbal and interacted with him on several occasions, and engaged him in philosophical debates. One of his debates with Iqbal led to the creation of one of his poems in his book Zarb-e-Kaleem.

Ahmed Shah Bokhari was well– read in Greek philosophy. He wrote an article titled Ancient Greek Rulers and Their Thinking, which was published in March 1919 in the Kehkashan Lahore. He was only 21 at the time.

His work at the UN was truly amazing during many years of his service to this body, which was in its infancy while Patras worked there. One of his major contributions was fighting the case for UNICEF during meetings that were convened to discuss its closure because, apparently it had fulfilled its designated task. Patras argued successfully that UNICEF's need in developing countries is much greater than its role in European countries after the second world war. His arguments persuaded even Eleanor Roosevelt to change the stance of her country,the United States.

His contributions to the UN as a leading diplomat were summed up by Ralph J. Bunche (UN Secretary–General and Nobel Peace Laureate) in these words:

"Ahmed Bokhari was, in fact, a leader and a philosopher, a savant, indeed, even though not old in years, a sort of elder statesman. His true field of influence was the entire complex of the United Nations family.... He was acutely conscious of the aspirations of people throughout the world for peace, for better standards of life, for freedom and dignity, but no one was more soundly aware than he of the difficulties and obstacles to be overcome in bringing about a broad advance of humankind along these avenues."

Bokhari's great work was done at the UN. He said that apart from being as great an internationalist as Dag Hammarskjöld, he was the first advocate of liberation movements in colonized countries across Africa and the Middle East. That credit has been denied him by his countrymen, as they have denied it to Sir Zafralla Khan, though for different reasons.

== Death and legacy ==
In 1923, he married Zubaida Wanchoo, a Punjabi-speaking Kashmiri lady and the daughter of a superintendent of police. They had three children: two sons Mansoor and Haroon, and a daughter, Roshan Ara. Roshan Ara died as a child. Patras Bokhari died on December 5, 1958, after a heart attack, still serving as a diplomat, and is buried in Valhalla Cemetery, New York.

A major Pakistani English–language newspaper, The Friday Times, comments about him: "In addition, he inspired great devotion and love in his friends, companions, and students."

== Awards and recognition ==
- He was appointed a Companion of the Order of the Indian Empire (CIE) in the 1944 Birthday Honours list.
- In October 1998, to mark his birth centenary, the Pakistan Post Office issued a commemorative postage stamp in his honor under the series, "Pioneers of Pakistan".
- On 14 August 2003 President of Pakistan, General Pervez Musharraf, announced the conferment of Hilal-e-Imtiaz, the country's second highest civilian award, posthumously on Bokhari. This award was formally conferred on 23 March 2004.
- Dr. Anwar Dil, a well known Pakistan writer based in the US published a book on Patras Bokhari in 1998 called "On This Earth Together" in 1998, after 20 years of painstaking research in the US and Pakistan.

=== Named after him ===
- Pakistan Academy of Letters named their The Patras Bukhari Award after him, first launched in 1981, given every year to the best prose book published in English by a Pakistani writer.
- The Government of Tunisia, named a road after him in Tunis, in recognition for his contribution towards the freedom of Tunisia from French Colonial Rule in 1956. There is also a road named after him in Islamabad, Pakistan.
- Government College University, Lahore, Pakistan named their auditorium "Bokhari Auditorium" to honour him.
- Government College University, Lahore , named its 4th Edition Of Model United Nations as “Patras Bukhari Government College Model United Nations” in honour to the contributions in Diplomacy and Representing Pakistan at United Nations.

Diplomatic posts
Preceded by Post established	Pakistan Ambassador to the United Nations; 1951– 1954	Succeeded by Prince Aly Khan
