= Shafiq-ur-Rahman (humorist) =

Pakistani humorist, physician and writer (1920-2000)

Shafiq-ur-Rahman شفیق الرحمن
- Born: Shafiq-ur-Rahman; 9 November 1920; Rohtak, Punjab, British India (now Haryana, India)
- Died: 19 March 2000 (aged 79); Rawalpindi, Punjab, Pakistan
- Occupations: humorist, Physician
- Awards: Hilal-i-Imtiaz (Crescent of Excellence) Award by the President of Pakistan in 2001

Shafiq-ur-Rahman (Urdu: شفیق الرحمن) (9 November 1920 – 19 March 2000) was a Pakistani humorist and short-story writer of Urdu language.

A medical doctor by profession, Rahman served in Pakistan Army and received the Hilal-e-Imtiaz for his military and civilian services. He has been appreciated by the writers and critics of Urdu literature.

== Biography ==
Rahman was born on 9 November 1920 in a Rajput family in Kalanaur, Rohtak district, British India. He received his education in Bahawalpur. He completed his MBBS from King Edward Medical College, Lahore in 1942, and post-graduation in tropical medicine and public health from Edinburgh, in 1952. Rahman began writing humorous stories during his school days. His stories were published in a literary monthly magazine Khayyam. His first book Kirneyn was completed before he joined the medical college and was published in 1938, while he was still a medical student.

Rahman joined the Indian Army Medical Corps and served at different war fronts during the Second World War. After the independence of Pakistan in 1947, he joined the Pakistan Army and eventually rose to the rank of general. By then, most of his important works like Shagufay, Lehrein, Parvaaz, and Hamaqatein, had been published. Later in 1954, another collection of his humorist essays Mazeed Hamaqatein was published. He also served as chairman of the Academy of Letters of Pakistan from 1980 to 1985. He continued to write till his death.

Rahman had three sons, Attique, Khalique and Ameen. He died on 19 March 2000 in Rawalpindi, Pakistan.

== Style and themes ==
Rahman's work added a new dimension to humour in Urdu literature. He created a world that was very real with all its joys, pains and anguish. It was an affirmation of life and of human values: empathy, compassion and respect. Even the seemingly frivolous and trivial situations had hidden meanings that probed deep into the human psyche. His language was simple, spontaneous and expressive. His unforgettable characters include Razia, Shaitaan, Hukoomat Aapa, Maqsood Ghora, Buddy, Judge Sahab, Nannha and many other girls including Sarwat, Kishwer, Sa'da, Azra Aapa, Nasreen, Akhtar, Ainak etc.

== Awards and recognition ==
He was awarded the Hilal-e-Imtiaz (Crescent of Excellence) Award by the President of Pakistan for his military and civilian services after his death on 23 March 2001.

== Views ==
In 2015, the Dawn Newspaper included Rehman's book Parvaaz in its list of "The 100 best Urdu books".

Rahman has highly been praised by Urdu writers, like:

"Though Shafeeq's humour is not shy of practical jokes, he uses it sparingly and his playfulness stops just in time to save the humour from becoming tragedy, which sometimes is the case with Chughtai. Secondly, Shafeeq is the master of parody".

"Then he often philosophises about joys and sorrows, sweeping the young readers with the bouts of optimism and pessimism, giving semi-philosophical, semi-romantic explanations to the queries that haunt the youth. In addition, his many essays are nothing but a collection of jokes and the essay itself is only the thread that binds them together. His characters, novel and funny, such as Rufi or Shaitaan, Maqsood Ghora, Hukoomat Aapa and Buddy, make reading joyful".

=== An excerpt ===
Owais Mughal talks of Shafiq-ur-Rahman, the humorist. He recalls:

"Following 'azad' poem is by one of my favorite writers, Shafiq-ur-Rehman and it comes from his book Lehrein. The poem is actually a satire on modern day poets who write 'azad' Urdu poem by using all the 'azadi' they can get. The poem describes a situation of fighting cats in a garden. I hope it brings a smile to you just like it has been bringing smiles to me for the past 20 years".

Here is an approximate translation of the poem:

Cats are fighting
Oh Cats
Caaaa…
…tsss
May be cats are fighting in garden now
There is the haze of dusk
It is time to rest
to work
to
get rewarded

And cats are fighting
May be they are 4 in number
or may be 3
But this little doubt has made house in my heart
that the cats are 5 in number
and definitely they cannot be 6
and the night is glowing in moonlight
and the moon is shining bright
and the moonlight is ubiquitous
and this moonlight will only last for a little while
and then there is a pitch dark night ahead

What was I saying?
Aah, it just slipped out of my mind
What happened to my memory?
Only God can fix it
Oh Yes, I just remembered!
the cats are fighting
Cats are probably finghting in the garden now!

== Bibliography ==
- Kirnein (Rays of Light) 1942
- Shagofey 1943
- Lehrein (Waves) 1944
- Madd-o-jazar (Ebb and Flow) 1946
- Parwaaz (Flight) 1945
- Himaqatain 1947
- Mazeed Himaqatain 1948
- Pachtaway (Regrets) 1948
- Turup Chaal 1948
- دجلہ Dajla (a travelogue) 1980
- Insaani Tamasha (an Urdu translation of The Human Comedy)
- Dareechay 1989
- Jaini
- Muskurahatein (smiles)
