= Amar Jaleel =

Sindhi fiction writer (born 1936)

Amar Jaleel PP
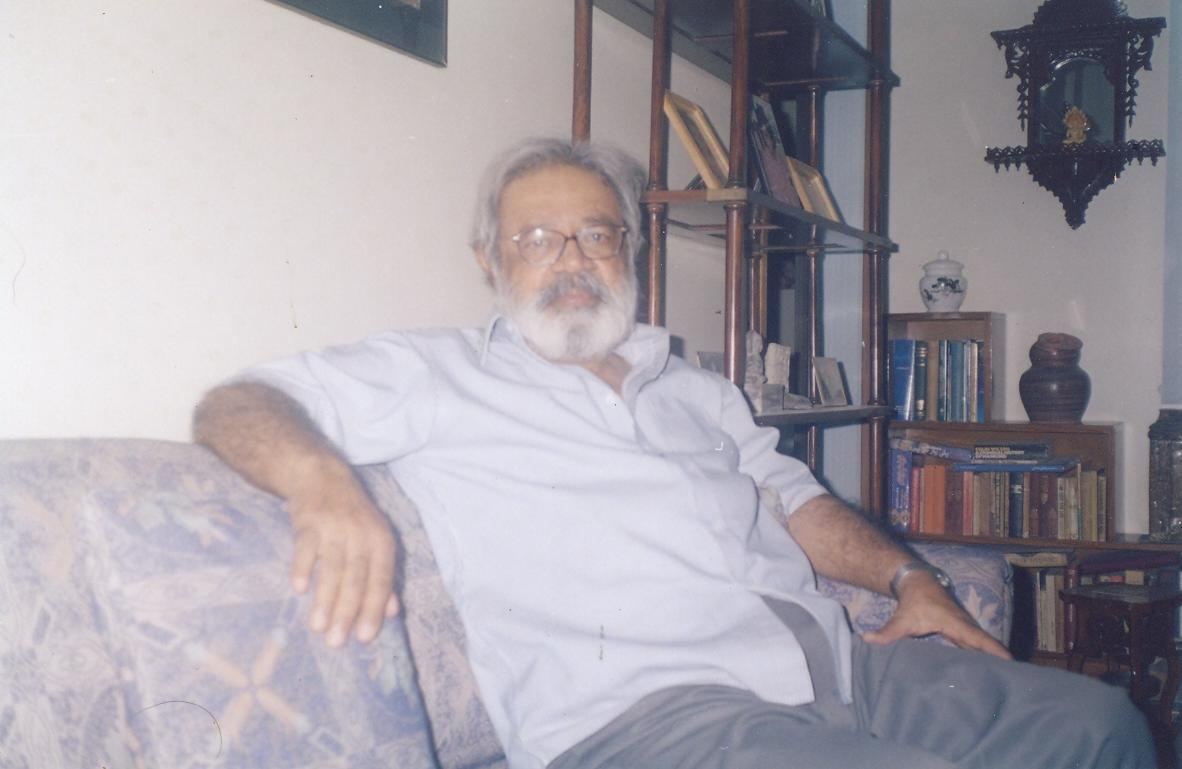
- Born: November 8, 1936 (age 89)
- Occupations: Writer, Fictional
- Writing career
- Genre: Fiction
- Subjects: Literature, philosophy, socialism
- Notable awards: Pride of Performance

Kazi Abdul Jaleel (Sindhi: قاضي عبدالجليل; born 1936 in Rohri), popularly known as Amar Jaleel, is a Sindhi fiction writer and columnist whose columns appear in various Sindhi, Urdu and English-language dailies of Pakistan. He has authored 20 books, and received awards including the Pride of Performance, the highest literary award in Pakistan, and Akhal Bharat Sindhi Sahat Sabha National Award (India).

== Early life ==
Jaleel started writing stories when he was 10 years old. He played cricket for his NJV School and also featured briefly in first class cricket as a wicketkeeper-batsman.

== Professional career ==
Amar Jaleel started his career at Radio Pakistan, Karachi before being transferred to Islamabad, where he worked in different positions at radio and educational institutions. Now retired, Jaleel currently resides in Karachi, Sindh, where he spends his leisure time writing articles for various Pakistan newspapers, and is known as a popular columnist for Dawn and The Nation currently working with a private regional Sindhi TV channel as anchor program class room.

== Thinking ==
As a left-wing political analyst he has repeatedly returned to one theme: why partition was wrong. Amar Jaleel is a prominent polemicist against the All-India Muslim League.

== Criticism ==
In 2017, during Sindh Literature Festival, Jaleel read a story خدا گم ٿي ويو (Khuda gum thee wayo, The God disappeared). Video of the session went viral on social media in March 2021. The video irked religious fundamentalists and they took his views as blasphemy of God. Jaleel was threatened to death by religious extremists. His opponents used Twitter and other social media networks to get him arrested and hanged publicly. While his supporters showed solidarity with him.

== Books ==
He has written hundreds of short stories in Sindhi; he has also written one novel in Sindhi titled Naith Gongey Ghalahyo نيٺ گونگي ڳالهايو ("Thus Dumb Spoke"). Some of Amar Jaleel's best known books are:

- Indra اندرا
- Sindhu Muhinje Saah Mein سنڌو منهنجي ساھ ۾
- Dil Jee Duniya دل جي دنيا
- Jadanh Maa'n Na Hoondus جڏهن مان نه هوندس
- Tareekh Jo Kafan تاريخ جو ڪفن
- Munhinjo Dus Aasman Khan Puchho منهنجو ڏس آسمان کان پڇو
- Tiyoon Wujood ٽيون وجود
- Rani Kot jo Khazano رني ڪوٽ جو خزانو
- Jeejal Mohanje Mao جيجل منهنجي ماءُ
- Chandd Wisaami Wayo. چنڊ وسامي ويو
- Adab Aen Siyasat ادب ۽ سياست
- Sarad Laash Jo Safar سرد لاش جو سفر
- Lahndar Sijj Je Laaam لهندڙ سج جي لام
- Sindh Naamo سنڌ نامو
- Sindhu Baqa Ain Maan Fana Ahyan سندو بقا ۽ مان فنا آهيان.
- Aatam katha
- He Sindh muhnji ta naahy
- Fida Hussain Phdine, Dhani Bakhash Dhane Aen Phndan Ja Kaalum. فدا حسين ڦودني، ڌڻي بخش ڌني ۽ ڦندڻ جا ڪالم

امر جليل جا تقريباََ ڪتاب هن لنڪ تان سافٽ ۾ ڊائونلوڊ ڪري سگهجن ٿا.

== Dramas ==
Mitti Jaa Marhoon

== Articles and essays ==
- To Define Sufism
- A Professor with a Fake Degree
- Wither Sufism
- Enigmatic History in a Nutshell
- Betrayed
- Antithesis of Sufism
- From Nowhere to Everywhere
- The Evil Within Uus

== Awards and recognition ==
Year	Award	Result	category	Ref.
	Pride of Performance Award	Won	Arts	
2017	Kamal-e-Fun Award	Won	Arts	

== See also ==
- Sindhi literature
