= Uttar Pradesh Urdu Academy =

Urdu Academy

Urdu Academy, Uttar Pradesh Uttar Pradesh Urdu Academy
- اردو اکادمی، اتر پردیش اتر پردیش اردو اکادمی
- The logo of Academy
- Formation: 1972
- Type: Literary
- Legal status: Registered Society
- Purpose: Literary and Cultural
- Headquarters: Lucknow, Uttar Pradesh
- Location: Lucknow, Uttar Pradesh
- Official language: Urdu
- Chairman: Chaudhary Kaiful Wara
- Secretary: Shaukat Ali
- Key people: Nawaz Deobandi
- Main organ: Academy, Library, Auditorium, Publications
- Parent organization: Ministry of Minorities Affairs UP
- Affiliations: Government of Uttar Pradesh
- Website: Official Website
- Remarks: To serve the Urdu language in Uttar Pradesh.

Uttar Pradesh Urdu Akademi, also known as Uttar Pradesh Urdu Academy or Urdu Academy, Uttar Pradesh (Urdu: اردو اکادمی، اتر پردیش), is an academy and registered society formed in the interest of developing the Urdu language and preserving the Urdu tradition and culture. It was established in January 1972. It is under control of the Ministry of Minority Affairs.

== History ==
The then-Uttar Pradesh government established this academy under registration of Societies Act with a motto of establishing an Urdu institution to look after the development of the Urdu language, literature, and cultural heritage. The office of the academy is situated in Lucknow city.
