= Pride of Performance Awards (2000–2009) =

Pride of Performance (Urdu: تمغۂ حسنِ کارکردگی) is a civil award given by the Government of Pakistan to Pakistani citizens in recognition of distinguished merit in the fields of literature, arts, sports, medicine, or science.

== 2000 ==
- Saeed Anwar (sports - cricketer)
- Bhawani Shankar Chowdhry (education)
- Hameed ul Haq (tennis - sports)
- Shareef Kunjahi (Punjabi-language writer)
- Amjad Parvez (Pakistani music critic and singer)
- Shamsher-ul-Hyderi (Pakistani Sindhi and Urdu journalist, TV anchorperson, poet and writer)
- Jaun Elia (Pakistani poet and linguist)

== 2001 ==
- Ather Shah Khan Jaidi (arts, literature, writer, poet, director, actor)
- Mahar Muhammad Iqbal Marath
- Kamaluddin Ahmed (nuclear physicist)
- Kajjan Begum (classical music singer, mother of singer Mehnaz Begum)

== 2002 ==
Awards were given on 23 March 2002.

- Himayat Ali Shair (poet and film songs lyricist)
- Jilani Kamran
- Ali Haider Joshi
- Ghaos Bakhsh Sabir
- Afzaal Ahmed
- Anwar Muzaffar
- Jan Nisar
- Rashid Ahmad
- Shafiqullah
- Aasim Fasih Khan
- Abdul Qadeer Malik
- Abdul Majeed
- Maj Imran Basit
- Ghulam Mustafa
- Mohsin Agha
- Mohammad Naeem
- Mushtaq Ahmed
- Khalid Aftab
- Deena M. Mistri
- Asghari Maqsood
- Sabz Ali
- Syed Moosa Hasany
- Shoaib Ahmad
- Shagufta Khaliq
- Sabira Begum
- Aisha Mohyuddin
- Asif Satar s/o late Abdus Sattar
- Umar Sardar
- Mohammad Ajmal Khan (sciences, botany)
- Mohammad Aslam Malik
- Mohammad Akram
- Mohammad Imran
- Mohammad Farooque
- Akhtar Viqar Azim
- Askari Mian Irani
- Shoaib Mansoor (film and TV producer/director)
- Shaukat Mahmood (Maxim)
- Farooq Zamir Ghory
- Kanwal Naseer
- Mohammad Jamil (late TV actor professionally known as Jamil Fakhri)
- Nazia Hasan (arts, singing)

== 2003 ==
On 14 August 2002, the following list of recipients was announced. It consists of 32 individuals. The award were received by the winners on 23 March 2003.

Name	Field	Specialization	Country	Province
Akhtar Hussain Jafari (Late)	Literature		Pakistan	
Ada Jafri	Literature		Pakistan	Sindh
Syed Imdad Hussaini	Literature		Pakistan	Sindh
Syed Zahoor Shah Hashmi (late)	Literature		Pakistan	Sindh
Shahbaz Malik	Literature		Pakistan	Punjab
Mohammad Nawaz Tair	Literature		Pakistan	
Muhammad Ali Siddiqui	Literature	Newspaper columnist	Pakistan	Sindh
Khalid Shamim	Science	Engineering	Pakistan	
Brigadier Khalid Latif	Science	Engineering	Pakistan	
Rana Abdul Qayyum	Science	Engineering	Pakistan	
Brig Imran Rehman	Science	Engineering	Pakistan	
Mohammad Khan Chaudhry	Science	Engineering	Pakistan	
Mohammad Riaz Khan	Science	Engineering	Pakistan	
Nadeem Ehsan	Science	Engineering	Pakistan	
Maqsood Ali	Science	Mining	Pakistan	
Malik Abdul Qadir	Science	Farming	Pakistan	
Barkat Ali Chaudhry	Science	Health	Pakistan	
Bashir Ahmad	Science	Physics	Pakistan	
Syed Shabbir Hussain	Science	Physics	Pakistan	
Sher Hassan	Science	Agricultural research	Pakistan	
Ghulam Ali Qureshi	Science	Biochemistry	Pakistan	
Mohammad Arif Niaz	Science	Physics	Pakistan	
Mohammad Khurshid	Science	Health	Pakistan	
Iftikhar Ahmed	Art	Cricket commentary	Pakistan	
Syed Afzal Hussain	Art	Sound recording	Pakistan	
Syed Munawar Saeed	Art	Actor	Pakistan	
Abdul Aziz Baloch	Art	Folk music	Pakistan	
Ghulam Mustafa	Art	Painting	Pakistan	
Majeed Khan	Art	Sarangi playing	Pakistan	
Muneeza Hashmi, daughter of renowned poet Faiz Ahmad Faiz	Art	PTV producer	Pakistan	
Haider Ali	Sports	Boxing	Pakistan	
Rozi Ali	Sports	Mountaineering	Pakistan	
Mohammad Irfan Islam	Sports	Weight-lifting	Pakistan	

== 2004 ==
On 14 August 2003, the following list of recipients was announced. It consists of 37 individuals. The award was received by the winners on 23 March 2004.

Name	Field	Specialization	Country	Province
Yousuf Khan	Art	Acting	Pakistan	Punjab
Mahtab Rashdi	Art	TV hosting/social work	Pakistan	Sindh
Chishty Bin Subh-o-Mujahid	Art	Cricket commentary	Pakistan	Sindh
Navid Shahzad	Art	Drama artist/writer	Pakistan	Punjab
Salahuddin	Art	Drama artist	Pakistan	Khyber Pakhtunkhwa
S. M. Naqi	Art	Hockey commentary	Pakistan	Sindh
Haji Atta Muhammad	Art	Lacquer art	Pakistan	Punjab
Moin Niazi (late)	Art	Music	Pakistan	Azad Jammu and Kashmir
Shahida Parveen (late)	Art	Classical music	Pakistan	Punjab
Tina Sani	Art	Music	Pakistan	Sindh
Niaz Ahmed	Art	Music composing for TV programs	Pakistan	Sindh
Samiur Rahman	Art	Photography	Pakistan	Punjab
Najma Najam	Art	Education	Pakistan	Punjab
Khalid Hussain Hashmi	Science	Engineering	Pakistan	Punjab
Syed Nayyar Ali	Science	Engineering	Pakistan	Punjab
Tariq Rahman	Arts	Education	Pakistan	Punjab
Ziaul Hasan Siddiqui	Science	Engineering	Pakistan	Punjab
Zia Aftab	Science	Electronics engineering	Pakistan	Punjab
Sohail Mazhar	Science	Mechanical engineering	Pakistan	Punjab
Abdul Aziz Mazhar	Science	Metallurgy engineering	Pakistan	Punjab
Iftikhar-us-Salam	Science	Metallurgy engineering	Pakistan	Punjab
Agha Khalid Saleem	Arts	Literature	Pakistan	Sindh
Bashir Ahmad Baloch	Arts	Literature	Pakistan	Balochistan
Dawar Khan Daud	Arts	Literature	Pakistan	Khyber Pakhtunkhwa
Farkhanda Lodhi	Arts	Literature	Pakistan	Punjab
Laeeq Ahmed Babree (late)	Arts	Literature	Pakistan	Punjab
Muhammad Usman Diplai	Arts	Literature	Pakistan	Sindh
Syed Shaukat Ali Shah	Arts	Literary Art	Pakistan	Punjab
Syed Sibit-ul-Hasnain	Science	Medicine	Pakistan	Punjab
Muhammad Javed Iqbal	Science	Medicine (cardiology)	Pakistan	Punjab
Muhammad Iqbal	Science		Pakistan	Punjab
Tariq Pervez	Science		Pakistan	Punjab
Asif Iqbal	Science	Mathematics	Pakistan	Khyber Pakhtunkhwa
Aslam Hayat	Science	Physics	Pakistan	Punjab
Muhammad Ashraf Tai	Sports	Martial arts	Pakistan	Sindh
Zakir Hussain Syed	Sports	Administration & management	Pakistan	Punjab
Mehrullah	Sports	Boxing	Pakistan	Sindh

== 2005 ==
On 14 August 2004, the following list of recipients was announced. The awards were received by the winners on 23 March 2005.

Name	Field	Specialization	Country	Province
Muhammad Mansha Yaad	Arts	Fiction writer and novelist	Punjab	Pakistan
Aisam-ul-Haq Qureshi	Sports	Tennis player	Punjab	Pakistan
Arif Lohar	Arts	folk music	Punjab	Pakistan
Shabnam Shakeel	Arts	Urdu Literature	Punjab	Pakistan
Rais Khan	Arts	Sitar player	Sindh	Pakistan
Abdul Rauf Rufi	Arts	Naat Khawn	Punjab	Pakistan

- Zafar-uz-Zaman (Chemistry)
- Rizwan Hussain (Chemistry)
- M. Salahuddin (Science)
- Khawaja Moiz-ud-Din (Engineering)
- Pervez Ahmed (Engineering)
- Rehan Bashir (Mechanical Engineering)
- Tariq Jawaid (Mechanical Engineering)
- Salim-ud-Din Zahir (Aerospace Engineering)
- M. Sadiq Kalim (Education)
- Saeed Khan Rangeela (Actor)
- Ayub Khoso (TV actor)
- Tarannum Naz (Singer)
- Khawaja Najmul Hassan (PTV producer)
- Tariq Rahman (Literature)
- Fahmida Hussain (Literarture)
- Sohail Abbas (Hockey player)

== 2006 ==
On 14 August 2005, the following list of recipients was announced. The award was formally received by the winners on 23 March 2006.

Name	Field	Specialization	Country	Province/territory
Abdul Rehman Brahvi	Literature	Writer	Pakistan	Balochistan
Hayatullah Khan Durrani	Mountaineering / caving adventure	Mountaineer, cave explorer, environmentalist	Pakistan	Balochistan
Khalida Hussain	Literature	Writer	Pakistan	Islamabad
Arfa Karim	Arts	Computer science	Punjab	Pakistan
Shafqat Tanvir Mirza	Literature	Writer	Pakistan	Punjab
Tassawar Khanum	Arts	Film and TV Singer	Pakistan	Punjab
Nayyara Noor	Arts	Film and TV Singer	Pakistan	Punjab
Ustad Badar uz Zaman	Arts	Classical music vocalist	Pakistan	Punjab
Ustad Qamar uz Zaman	Arts	Classical music vocalist	Pakistan	Punjab
Zehra Nigah	Arts	writer	Pakistan	Sindh
Asghar Nadeem Syed	Arts	TV playwright and professor	Pakistan	Punjab
Amir Adnan	Business	Fashion designer	Pakistan	Sindh
Ghazi Sial	Literature	Pashto Poet	Pakistan	Khyber Pakhtunkhwa
Masood Akhtar	Arts	Actor	Pakistan	Punjab
Aftab Iqbal Shamim	Education	Professor	Pakistan	Punjab

== 2007 ==
On 14 August 2006, the following list of recipients was announced. The award was received by the winners on 24 March 2007.

Name	Field	Specialization	Country
Riaz Mahmood	Arts	Broadcasting	Pakistan
Shaan	Arts	Acting	Pakistan
Asad Amanat Ali Khan	Arts	Singing (classical music and ghazal singing)	Pakistan
Hamid Ali Khan	Arts	Singing (classical music and ghazal singing)	Pakistan
Naheed Akhtar	Arts	Singing	Pakistan
Ustaad Bashir Khan	Arts	Music (tabla player)	Pakistan
Faakhir Mehmood	Arts	Singing	Pakistan
Munnu Bhai	Arts	Journalism	Pakistan
Mohsin Shirazi	Acting		Pakistan
Fehmida Firdous	Public Services		Pakistan
Mehwish Nadir Baloch	Nursing		Pakistan
Mubarak Ali Khan	Arts	Singing classical music	Pakistan

== 2008 ==
On 14 August 2007, the following list of recipients was announced. It consists of 39 individuals. The award was received by the winners on 23 March 2008.

Name	Field	Specialization	Country	Province
Jamaluddin Ahmed	Science	Engineering	Pakistan	
Liaquat Ali Khan	Science	Nuclear engineering	Pakistan	
Ghulam Mohyuddin	Science	Experimental physics	Pakistan	
Sohail Ahmed	Science	Engineering	Pakistan	
Syed Zia Hasnain	Science	Nuclear engineering	Pakistan	
Ziafat Hussain	Science		Pakistan	
Muhammad Shahzad	Science	Engineering	Pakistan	
S Tauqeerul Islam	Science	Engineering	Pakistan	
Muhammad Arshad	Science		Pakistan	
Farhan Saif	Science		Pakistan	
Dr. Syed Abdul Mujeeb	Science	Medicine	Pakistan	Sindh
Muhammad Saeed Khokhar	Science	Medicine	Pakistan	
Syeda Anese Fatima Majid Khan	Education		Pakistan	
Allah Bukhsh	Art	Khussa making (shoe-making)	Pakistan	
Munni Begum	Art	Singing	Pakistan	
Akhtar Munir	Art	Wood carving	Pakistan	
Gopal Das	Art	Tie & dye	Pakistan	Sindh
Haji Mehr Ali	Art	Qawwali	Pakistan	
Haji Sher Ali	Art	Qawwali	Pakistan	
Nahid Raza	Art	Visual arts	Pakistan	Sindh
Gulbahar Bano	Arts	Singing	Pakistan	Sindh
Mujahid Hussain	Arts	Composer - TV programs musician	Pakistan	
Rasheed Malik	Arts	Music	Pakistan	
Sultana Siddiqui	Arts	TV producer/media professional	Pakistan	Sindh
Abdul Karim Balouch	Arts	TV producer/drama writer	Pakistan	Sindh
Abdul Qadir Junejo	Arts	Drama acting	Pakistan	Sindh
M. Hanif Raza	Arts	Photography	Pakistan	
Nasreen Askari	Arts	Art & culture	Pakistan	
Shafqat Amanat Ali Khan	Arts	Classical music vocalist	Pakistan	Punjab
Mansoor Rahi	Arts	Painting	Pakistan	Punjab
Ustad Mubarak Ali Khan	Arts	Classical singing	Pakistan	Punjab
Noorul Huda Shah	Literature	Playwright	Pakistan	Sindh
Saleem Akhtar	Literature		Pakistan	
Tanveer Abbasi	Literature	Poetry	Pakistan	Sindh
Muhammad Taha Khan	Literature	Poet	Pakistan	
Lt-Cdr Zahid Rauf	Sport	Yachting	Pakistan	
Nida Waseem	Sport	Tennis	Pakistan	Sindh
Zubair Ahmed Hundal	Sport	Kabaddi	Pakistan	
Shahid Rehman	Sport	Jockey	Pakistan	
Tari Khan	Arts	Tabla playing	Pakistan	Punjab

== 2009 ==
On 14 August 2008, the following list of recipients was announced. It consists of 58 individuals. The award was received by the winners on 23 March 2009.

Name	Field	Specialization	Country	Province
Shafqat Farooq	Science	Agriculture/biotechnology	Pakistan	Punjab
Javed Iqbal Akhter	Science	Physics	Pakistan	Punjab
Syed Muhammad Hassan Zaidi	Science	Information technology	Pakistan	Punjab
Muhammad Mazhar	Science	Chemistry	Pakistan	Punjab
Muhammad Aslam Noor	Science	Mathematics	Pakistan	Punjab
Obaidullah Baig	Arts	PTV personality (Kasauti - 1967)	Pakistan	Sindh
Muhammad Riaz	Science	Chemical engineering	Pakistan	Punjab
Muhammad Daud Shah	Science	Communication engineering	Pakistan	Punjab
Qammar Mehboob	Science	Chemical engineering	Pakistan	Punjab
Faiq Mazhar	Science	Geology	Pakistan	Punjab
Muhammad Rashid Mansoor	Science	Mechanical engineering	Pakistan	Punjab
Muhammad Naeem Sheikh	Science	Mechanical engineering	Pakistan	Punjab
Shahid Iqbal	Science	Civil engineering	Pakistan	Punjab
Tafseer Ahmad	Science	Electronics engineering	Pakistan	Punjab
Haider Ali Bhatti	Science	Aerospace engineering	Pakistan	Punjab
Tariq Ahmad	Science	Mechanical engineering	Pakistan	Punjab
Noorullah	Science	Ballistics	Pakistan	Punjab
Arshad Ali	Education	Professor	Pakistan	Punjab
Muhammad Younus Khan	Art	Cameraman	Pakistan	Punjab
Emanuel Philip	Art	Photography	Pakistan	Punjab
Rehana Siddiqui	Art	Acting	Pakistan	Punjab
Shabbir Hussain	Art	Tabla playing	Pakistan	Punjab
Manzoor Hussain	Art	Music composer	Pakistan	Punjab
Shafqat Ali Khan	Art	Classical music	Pakistan	Punjab
Parveen Nazar	Art	Singing	Pakistan	Punjab
Javaid Tufail Niazi (son of folk singer Tufail Niazi)	Art	Folk singing	Pakistan	Punjab
Babar Ali Niazi (son of folk singer Tufail Niazi)	Art	Folk singing	Pakistan	Punjab
Hajra Mansoor	Art	Painting	Pakistan	Punjab
Muhammad Izhar-ul-Haq	Literature		Pakistan	Punjab
Abbas Ather	Literature		Pakistan	Punjab
Anwaar Ahmad	Literature		Pakistan	Punjab
Shaukat Hamid Kiani	Health	Management and administration	Pakistan	Punjab
Safdar Ali Kiyani (late)	Education	Professor	Pakistan	Punjab
Ali Moeen Nawazish	Education	Computer expert	Pakistan	Punjab
Muhammad Iqbal Bhanger	Science	Chemistry	Pakistan	Sindh
Behroze Sabzwari	Arts	Actor	Pakistan	Sindh
Khalifa Muhammad Irshad Beg	Arts	Woodwork	Pakistan	Sindh
Naseem Sultan	Arts	Embroidery	Pakistan	Sindh
Ghous Bux Brohi	Arts	Bansri player/Alghoza player	Pakistan	Sindh
Sahib Dino Mallah	Arts	Khes making	Pakistan	Sindh
Satish Chandra Anand	Arts	Film producer	Pakistan	Sindh
Ruheena Malik	Arts	Calligraphy	Pakistan	Sindh
Aslam Farrukhi	Literature	Writer	Pakistan	Sindh
Ahmed Shah	Literature	Poet	Pakistan	Sindh
Muhammad Faizan	Sports	Mountaineering	Pakistan	Sindh
Saqib Ali	Science	Chemistry	Pakistan	Khyber Pakhtunkhwa
Muhammad Qasim Naseem	Literature	Journalism/writer	Pakistan	Khyber Pakhtunkhwa
Abdul Wahid Yousafi	Literature	Journalism	Pakistan	Khyber Pakhtunkhwa
Umar Nasir	Literature	Radio drama writer	Pakistan	Khyber Pakhtunkhwa
Abdur Rasheed Naz	Art	Acting	Pakistan	Khyber Pakhtunkhwa
Badar Munir	Art	Acting	Pakistan	Khyber Pakhtunkhwa
Muhammad Gul	Art	Swati shari weaving	Pakistan	Khyber Pakhtunkhwa
Mehnaz Hyat	Art	Balochi handicrafts	Pakistan	Balochistan
Abdul Qadir	Art	Acting	Pakistan	Balochistan
Muneer Ahmed Badini	Literature		Pakistan	Balochistan
Abdus Samad Chisti Mujahid	Literature	Journalism	Pakistan	Balochistan
Umer Khan Achakzai	Sports	Karate	Pakistan	Balochistan
Asada Yutaka		Services to Pakistan	Japan	
