= List of Urdu short story writers =

This is the list of those writers who wrote short stories in Urdu Language.

List of Urdu Short Story Writers
Author	Life	Location	Notable Short Stories
Syed Sajjad Haider Yaldram	1880-1943	Lucknow	Izdawaj-e-Mohabbat
Saadat Hasan Manto	1912-1955	Lahore	Thanda Gosht, Toba Tek Singh
Premchand	1880-1936	Benares	Shatranj ki Bazi, Idgah, Kafan
Ahmed Nadeem Qasmi	1916-2006	Lahore	Kapaas Ka Phool, Alhamdulillah
Krishan Chander	1914-1977	Bombay	Poore Chand Ki Raat
Khwaja Ahmad Abbas	1914-1987	Bombay	Meri Maut
Mumtaz Mufti	1905-1995	Islamabad	Samay Ka Bandhan, Chup
Intizar Hussain	1925-2016	Lahore	Shehr-e-Afsos, Aakhri Aadmi
Naiyer Masud	1936-2017	Lucknow	Sheesha Ghat, Murasila
Mustansar Hussain Tarar	b. 1939	Lahore	Siyah Aankh Mein Tasweer
Enver Sajjad	1935-2019	Lahore	Gaaye
Upendranath Ashk	1910-1996	Allahabad	Mohabbat, Amn Ka Taalib
Abdullah Hussain	1931-2015	Lahore	
Mirza Adeeb	1914-1999	Lahore	Maan, Woh Kaun Thi
Muhammad Mansha Yaad	1937-2011	Islamabad	Waqt Samandar
Mohammad Hameed Shahid	b. 1957	Islamabad	Janm Jahannam
Ghulam-us-Saqlain Naqvi	1922-2002	Lahore	Band Gali
Muhammad Asim Butt	b. 9 December 1966	Lahore	Ishtihaar Aadami اشتہار آدمی اور دوسری کہانیاں
Ismat Chughtai	1915-1991	Bombay	Lihaaf, Chauthi Ka Jora
Niaz Fatehpuri	1884-1966	Karachi	Dars-e-Mohabbat
Ashfaq Ahmed	1925-2004	Lahore	Punjab Ka Dupatta
Gulzar	b. 1934	Bombay	Saanjh, Addha
Majnun Gorakhpuri	1904-1988	Aligarh	Tum Mere Ho
Akhtar Husain	1912-1992	Karachi	Jism Ki Pukaar
Ali Sardar Jafri	1913-2000	Bombay	Lakshmi
Syed Muhammad Ashraf	b.1957	Aligarh	Daar Se Bichde, Aadmi
Salam Bin Razzaq	1941–present	Bombay	Nadi
Bano Qudsia	1928-2017	Lahore	Tauba-shikan
Qurratulain Hyder	1927-2007	Lucknow	Awaara Gard
Hajra Masroor	1930-2012	Karachi	Faasla
Zahida Hina	b. 1946	Karachi	
Khadija Mastoor	1927-1982	Lahore	Bochaar, Khel
Rashid Jahan	1905-1952	Aligarh	Dilli Ki Sair
Altaf Fatima	1927-2018	Lahore	Dard-e-La-Dawa, Neon Signs
Rajinder Singh Bedi	1915-1984	Bombay	Laajwanti
Khalida Hussain	1937-2019	Islamabad	Sawari
Ghulam Abbas	1909-1982	Karachi	Anandi, Katba
Sajjad Zaheer	1899-1973	Lucknow	Garmiyon ki Ek Raat, Dulari
Qasim Mahmood	1928-2010	Lahore	Qasim Kee Mendi, Maut ke khusb
Ahmed Ali	1910-1994	Delhi	Badal Nahin Aate
Asad Muhammad Khan	b. 1932	Karachi	Baasude Ki Maryam
Jamila Hashmi	1929-1988	Lahore	Murda Sar Ki Hikaayat
