= Jawayd Anwar =

Pakistani poet and writer (1959–2011)

- Anwar in c. 2005–2007
- Born: 18 April 1959; Lahore, Punjab, Pakistan
- Died: 25 November 2011 (aged 52); Lahore, Punjab, Pakistan
- Education: Punjab Medical College; Oriental College
- Occupations: Poet; doctor; psychiatrist
- Children: 4
- Writing career
- Language: Urdu
- Period: 1991–2011
- Genres: Nazms; ghazals
- Notable work: Shahr Mayn Sham
- Movement: Halqa-e Arbab-e Zauq

Jawayd Anwar (Note: Urdu: جاوید انور) (18 April 1959 – 25 November 2011) was a Pakistani poet and writer. He is widely recognized as a significant writer in modern Urdu poetry, particularly for his nazms (thematic poems). He authored four volumes of poetry, including a posthumous collection published in 2016 titled Barzakh Kay Phul.

== Early life and education ==
Jawayd Anwar was born on 18 April 1959 in the Sant Nagar suburb of Lahore, Punjab, Pakistan. The eldest member of a Bhatti family that emigrated from eastern Punjab of British India, he spent most of his childhood in Shahinabad, Sargodha. His father, Anwar Ali Bhatti, belonged to the city of Amritsar and worked as a civil servant in the Punjab Irrigation Department whereas Jawayd's mother, Nasir Akhtar, was a native of Jalandhar. His grandfather, Chaudhary Zahuruddin Bhatti, was a local zamindar who had migrated to Pakistan in the wake of the partition of India in 1947.

Anwar attended Government Primary School in southern Sargodha and later enrolled at the Punjab Medical College in Faisalabad and also studied at the Oriental College in Lahore. After completing his MBBS, Anwar served at the Lahore General Hospital and later at the Allama Iqbal Medical College. Anwar was also a qualified psychiatrist.

== Poetic career ==
During his time in Sargodha, Anwar had become associates with several poetic figures such as the likes of Khurshid Rizvi, Ghulam-us-Saqlain Naqvi and Wazir Agha. It was here from where Anwar became fond of Urdu poetry and actively began writing poems in his teenage. In an interview in the 1980s, Anwar said that he may have begun writing poetry when he was in grade nine or ten.

Iftikhar Arif (left), Mohammad Hameed Shahid (centre) and Jawayd Anwar (right) in Islamabad on 21 November 2011; four days before Anwar's death

While on a short return to Pakistan, Anwar spent a few days at a mushaira with poets in Islamabad and died of a sudden heart attack in Lahore on 25 November 2011. One of his last poems Agr Apnay Betay Ko Tum Nay Usama Kaha ("if you named your son Usama") became a topic of discussion for its style among intellectuals and was considered innovative in modern Urdu literature. Members of the Urdu literary community expressed condolences at his demise and his funeral prayers were held at the EME Mosque. Days following his demise, Urdu literary critic Mansoor Afaq dedicated a short poem to Anwar titled Nazm Marr Gai Hai ("poem has died").

== Legacy and reception ==
Anwar is counted among the contemporary Urdu poets who contributed to modern nazms. In 2007, The Herald deemed Anwar as one of the poets "with extensive nazms". Some of Anwar's couplets were initially published in the Mahe Nao and Funoon literary magazine. Academic Afsar Sajid described the book as a "concise but expressive flap". Some of Anwar's unreleased poems were posthumously published by his associates in 2016 under the title Barzakh Kay Phul ("flowers of the barrier"). Renowned author Mustansar Hussain Tarar described the book as between dukh aur sukh (sadness and happiness).

In November 2013, on the occasion of his second death anniversary, members of the Halqa-e Arbab-e Zauq held a gathering in memory of Anwar at the iconic Pak Tea House in Lahore. In November 2021, Iftikhar Arif presided a conference of the Pakistan Academy of Letters (PAL) in remembrance of Anwar.

== Books ==
At the age of 32, Anwar's first book Shahr Mayn Sham ("evening in the city") was published in 1991. Anwar's other works include Bheriay Soay Nahin ("the wolves didn't sleep") and Ashkon Mayn Dhanak ("sinking in tears"). His most popular poem "Ham Kay Hiro Nahin" ("we are not the heroes"), written in Ashkon Mayn Dhanak, has been the subject of poetic discourse. Anwar also co-authored the book Qahqaqa Insan Nay Ijad Kiya ("humans invented laughter") along with fellow writers Masood Qamar and Hussain Abid.

Year	Title	Urdu title	English translation
1991	Shahr Mayn Sham	شہر میں شام	"Evening in the city"
1994	Ashkon Mayn Dhanak	اشکوں میں دھنک	"Rainbow in tears"
2009	Bheriay Soay Nahin	بھیڑیے سوئے نہیں	"The wolves did not sleep"
2011	Qahqaha Insan Nay Ijad Kiya	قہقہہ انسان نے ایجاد کیا	"Humans invented laughter"
2016	Barzakh Kay Phul	برزخ کے پھول	"Flowers of barzakh"
