= Mukhtar Siddiqui =

Pakistani poet (1919–1972)

- مختار صدیقی
- Born: Mukhtar ul Haque Siddiqui; 1 March 1919; Sialkot, Punjab, British India
- Died: 18 September 1972 (aged 53); Lahore, Pakistan
- Resting place: Lahore
- Other name: Mukhtarul-Haque Siddiqui
- Education: Government Gordon College
- Alma mater: University of the Punjab
- Occupations: Poet; Writer; Playwright; Novelist; Broadcaster
- Years active: 1929–1972
- Spouse: Zakia Begum
- Children: 3

Mukhtar-ul-Haque Siddiqui (Urdu: مختار صدیقی) (1 March 1919 – 18 September 1972) was a Pakistani Urdu poet, writer, playwright, broadcaster and translator. He was known for his work with the influential literary circle, Halqa-e-Arbab-e-Zauq.

== Early life and education ==
He born into a religious family in Sialkot, later he moved with his family to Gujranwala. He received his early education at home before completing his matriculation from Government High School in Gujranwala in 1934. He then attended Islamia College in Lahore, where he earned his Bachelor of Arts degree in 1938 and edited the Urdu section of the college magazine.

He was a prominent figure in the "Halqa-e-Arbab-e-Zauq", a progressive Urdu literary movement. His poetry was guided by his mentor, Seemab Akbarabadi. After the partition of India in 1947, Siddiqui moved to Pakistan. He began his career with Radio Pakistan before becoming a scriptwriter for Pakistan Television.

In 1956, he pursued a master's degree in Urdu at Gordon College in Rawalpindi, earning first-class honors and a gold medal from the University of the Punjab. His thesis was on the poet Mohsin Kakorvi. In his essay "Kacha-Chitha", he described a pivotal moment where his artistic self, "Mukhtar Siddiqui," took precedence over his given name, "Mukhtar-ul Haque Siddiqui".

== Career ==
Siddiqui was a prominent and influential member of the "Halqa-e-Arbab-e-Zauq", a literary circle known for fostering innovative trends in Urdu poetry. He served as its secretary in 1947, where his introductory remarks before each session offered new insights into literature. His work is characterised by a modern sensibility and a keen awareness of contemporary political, social, and international affairs.

He was noted for his distinctive linguistic expression and thoughtful philosophical approach. After the 1947 Partition, he contributed to an anthology of poems selected from literary journals, alongside Zaheer Kashmiri and Qayyum Nazar. The collection featured his poem "Bazyafta".

Mukhtar's professional career included positions at Radio Pakistan, where he worked as a clerk and was later promoted to program assistant. He was later promoted to program assistant at the radio station before leaving to become a script editor for PTV. In Rawalpindi, he shared a two-story house with his friend, the journalist Afzal Parvez. He eventually left radio to become a script editor for Pakistan Television (PTV). In addition to his poetry, he wrote dramas for both radio and television, showcasing his versatile writing skills.

== Personal life ==
Mukhtar married Zakia Begum the daughter of Faiz Rasul a friend of his father and had three children.

== Death ==
Mukhtar Siddiqui died on 19 September 1972, in Lahore, Pakistan. Mukhtar's death occurred soon after a painful meeting at PTV, where he was reportedly snubbed. He is buried in a grave in Ichhra neighbourhood, Lahore, Pakistan.

== Published works ==
His notable published poetry collections include:

- Manzil-e-Shab
- Sah-Harfi
- Aasaar

Beyond poetry, Siddiqui also produced translations and wrote dramas.

== Tribute ==
After his death, a tribute session was held in his memory. It was attended by notable figures in literature, including Yusuf Kamran, Mirza Adeeb, Zaheer Kashmiri, A. Hameed, Sajjad Haider, Ashfaq Ahmed, Ejaz Batalvi, Qayyum Nazar, Ahmad Nadeem Qasmi, Ayub Roomani, and Abdul Shakoor Bedil.

== Awards and recognition ==
- Presidential Iqbal Award by the President of Pakistan in 1987.
