= Kamal Ahmed Rizvi =

Pakistani actor and playwright

- Born: 1 May 1930; Gaya, Bihar, British India
- Died: 17 December 2015 (aged 85); Karachi, Sindh, Pakistan
- Occupations: TV actor, playwright
- Known for: Set a new trend in TV situation comedy dramas in Pakistan
- Spouses: Nuzhat; Aamna; Ishrat Jehan
- Children: 1
- Awards: Pride of Performance Award by the President of Pakistan in 1989

Syed Kamal Ahmed Rizvi (1 May 1930 – 17 December 2015) was a Pakistani television actor and playwright. He was born in Bihar, British India and died in Karachi, Pakistan. Rizvi wrote and starred in the comedy series Alif Noon (1981-82 TV season), and won a Pride of Performance Award in 1989. Considered a founding father of theatre in Pakistan, he was also a director, translator, editor and a painter.

== Early life ==
Kamal Ahmed Rizvi and his family had migrated to Karachi, Pakistan from Bihar, British India after 1947. During his early days in Karachi, he lived in an apartment in Arambagh area, before moving to Lahore to meet his idol, the renowned short story writer Saadat Hasan Manto with whom he spent a lot of precious time in Lahore in the early 1950s, and was influenced by him. Rizvi was generally impressed by the Progressive Writers' Movement members that he associated with in Lahore and Karachi. In Karachi, Saddar's Café George became his version of Pak Tea House (Lahore's famous hangout centre for leftist writers and intellectuals). Rizvi used to spend many hours here talking with renowned writers like Ibrahim Jalees and Shaukat Siddiqui.

== Career ==
At first, he tried his hand at editing some popular digests such as Tehzeeb and Shama. He also tried his luck with cinema but then decided not to pursue it and instead chose to be associated with Radio Pakistan.

Kamal Ahmed Rizvi got a chance for his first acting stint when renowned Pakistani actor Zia Mohyeddin staged Shakespeare's play 'Julius Caesar' for BBC Urdu Service. This led him to take up numerous theatre ventures and subsequently, television. Rizvi was invited to come to TV by one of the pioneers of Pakistan television Aslam Azhar. Here, he met the Hardy (actor Nanha) to his Laurel (Laurel played by Kamal Ahmed Rizvi himself in their future TV shows). This stand-up comedy duo ruled Pakistan Television for many years in the 1980s with their popular TV comedy series.

During his early days at Pakistan Television, Kamal Rizvi had also done a series of interviews with the common people of Lahore which included a 'paan-seller' and a 'waiter' of a coffeehouse.

== Death and legacy ==
Kamal Ahmed Rizvi, the man behind one of the most celebrated sitcoms of the country Alif Noon died of a heart attack after a prolonged illness in Karachi on 17 December 2015 at the age of 85. Before this, Kamal had survived a serious heart attack in 1993. He is survived by his only one son from his first wife, Nuzhat. This son has been living in the US for a long time. His marriage with the second wife Aamna lasted only for a short time because she wanted to go back and settle in India and he wanted to stay in Pakistan. His third wife was Ishrat Jehan who was with him until his death on 17 December 2015.

Kamal Ahmed Rizvi was known to stay away from undue publicity and always kept a modest profile despite being a successful celebrity. He was considered to be one of the trendsetters of situation comedy TV dramas in Pakistan in the early 1980s. His work was widely acclaimed for exposing corruption in the society through comedy and satire.

== Books ==
Kamal Ahmed Rizvi was also an accomplished writer and satirist, and some of his plays, scripts, and memoirs have been published in book form. Notable books include:

- Alif Noon: Mukammal Scripts – A collection of scripts from his iconic television series Alif Noon, originally broadcast from the 1960s to the 1980s.
- Kamal Ahmed Rizvi: Safarnama – Memoir-style essays reflecting on his career in theatre, television, and cultural commentary.
- Mazah Nigari aur Alif Noon – A critical appreciation and commentary on his satirical work, often paired with selected writings and interviews.
- Chand Mazahiya Mazameen – A compilation of humorous essays originally published in Urdu literary magazines.

Several of his columns and essays were also published in newspapers and later anthologized into booklets.
