= Khalida Hussain =

Pakistani novelist (1937–2019)

- Born: Khalida Asghar; 18 July 1937; Lahore, Punjab Province, British Raj
- Died: 11 January 2019 (aged 81); Islamabad, Pakistan
- Education: Lahore College for Women University; Oriental College, Lahore; University of the Punjab
- Occupations: Fiction writer, novelist and critic
- Writing career
- Language: Urdu
- Years active: 1956 – 2017
- Notable work: Kaghazi Ghat
- Notable awards: Pride of Performance (2006)

Khalida Hussain (Urdu: خالدہ حسین; 18 July 1937 – 11 January 2019) was an Urdu fiction writer and novelist from Pakistan. She introduced a new trend in Urdu fiction writing, she mostly wrote stories on real life and was regarded as the best fiction writer in Pakistan after Intizar Hussain. Khalida's novel Kaghazi Ghat (Paper Wharf) was her last novel in Urdu Literature.

== Early life and education ==
Born as Khalida Asghar in Lahore on 18 July 1937, her father, A. G. Asghar was vice chancellor of University of Engineering and Technology, Lahore. Khalida completed her BA from the Lahore College for Women University. Later she received a master's degree from University of the Punjab, Lahore. She got her Masters in Literature from the University of the Punjab. She shifted to Islamabad after her marriage, then Karachi and returned to Islamabad.

== Career ==
Khalida Hussain chose teaching as her career besides being a writer. She started short story writing in 1956. Many compilations of her short stories have been published, which include Pehchaan (1982), Darwaza (1984), Masroof Aurat, Hain Khaab Main Hunooz and Mein Yahan Hun. She also authored a novel Kaghazi Ghat.

== Awards and recognition ==
- Pride of Performance Award by the President of Pakistan in 2006 for her services in Urdu Literature.

== Death ==
She died on 11 January 2019 at the age of 81 in Islamabad, Pakistan. In her old age, she was getting weak with some chronic illnesses.

== Works ==
=== Short stories ===
- Pehchaan (1981)
- Darwaza (1982)
- Masroof Aurat (1989)
- Hain Khaab Main Hunooz (1995)
- Mein Yahan Hun (2005)
- Majmua Khalida Hussain (2008)
- Jeenay Ki Pabandi (2017)

=== Novels ===
- Kaghazi Ghat (2005)

=== Other ===
- Pakistani Adab 1992 (1993)
- Adbiyat, Khawateen Ka Aalmi Adam (2002)
