= Qayyum Nazar =

Pakistani poet (1914–1989)

- Born: Khwaja Abdul Qayoom Batt; March 7, 1914; Lahore, British Raj, India
- Died: June 23, 1989 (aged 75); Lahore, Pakistan
- Occupations: Poet, Professor
- Known for: Qalb-O-Nazar kay Silsilay (Qayyum Nazar's book)
- Awards: Presidential Iqbal Award by the President of Pakistan in 1986

Qayyum Nazar (7 March 1914 – 23 June 1989) was a prominent Urdu language poet from Pakistan. Along with fellow Urdu poets Meeraji and Noon Meem Rashid, Nazar was a member of the Pakistani literary circle, Halqa-e Arbab-e Zauq.

== Early life and career ==
Qayyum Nazar was born in Lahore in British Raj, India. He worked as a professor at the Government College, Lahore. He wrote many books of Urdu poetry, specializing in classical forms of poetry. His first published ghazal was printed in 1933. He represented the new wave of Urdu ghazals and was impressed by many classic Urdu poets, especially two other masters of the ghazal, Mir Taqi Mir, an 18th-century poet considered the founder of Urdu poetry, and Fani Badayuni, an earlier 20th-century Urdu poet.

He poetic work included Urdu ghazals, na`ats, and verses composed in Punjabi. His kulliyat, a compilation of Urdu poetry, was published in 1987 and is called "Qalb-O-Nazar kay Silsilay". Nazar lived his entire life in Lahore, but traveled frequently, and his poetry reflects his life, his appreciation of the natural world, and his travels.

== Awards and recognition ==
- Presidential Iqbal Award by the President of Pakistan in 1986.
