= Mohammad Hameed Shahid =

Pakistani novelist (born 1957)

Hameed Shahid
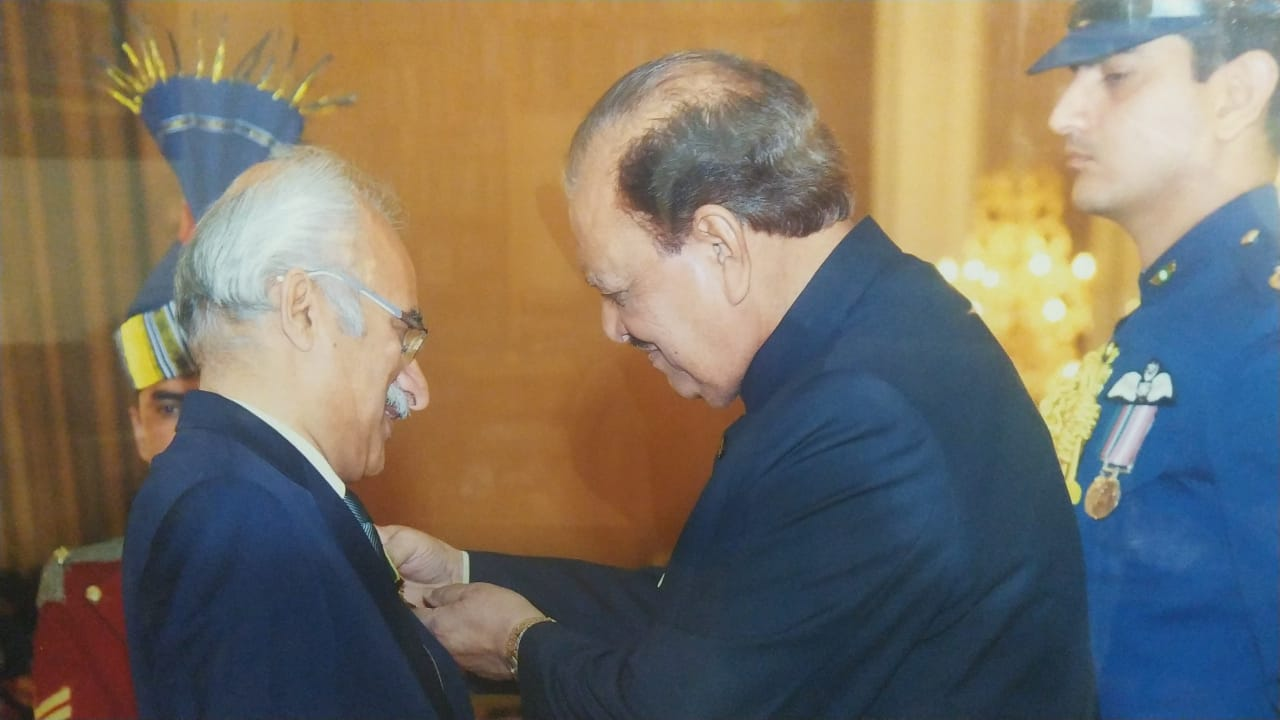
- Shahid receiving Tamgha-e-Imtiaz from President Mamnoon Hussain
- Born: 23 March 1957 (age 69); Pindigheb, Pakistan
- Education: University of Punjab
- Occupations: Fiction writer; writer
- Spouse: Yasmin Hameed
- Children: 5
- Writing career
- Language: Urdu
- Notable awards: Tamgha-i-Imtiaz
- Website: hameedshahid.com

Mohammad Hameed Shahid (Note: Urdu: محمد حمید شاہد) (born 1957) is a Pakistani short story writer, novelist and literary critic. He is well known for his Urdu fiction writings. He was awarded the Tamgha-e-Imtiaz in 2016, one of the highest literary honours given by the Government of Pakistan.

== Early life and education ==
Hameed Shahid was born on 1957 in Pindigheb town of the Attock district in Punjab. His father Ghulam Muhammad was prominent social worker and political figure of the area.

After his initial education, Shahid attended the University of Agriculture, Faisalabad from 1974, where he obtained an honors degree in agriculture, horticulture. Next, he attended the University of the Punjab to study law but left before completing his studies in 1983 to return to Pindigheb as his father was seriously ill and later on died.

== Banking career ==
Mohammad Hameed Shahid (center) with fellow writers Iftikhar Arif (left) and Jawayd Anwar (right) in November 2011

After the death of his father, Shahid decided to join the Agricultural Development Bank of Pakistan in 1983.

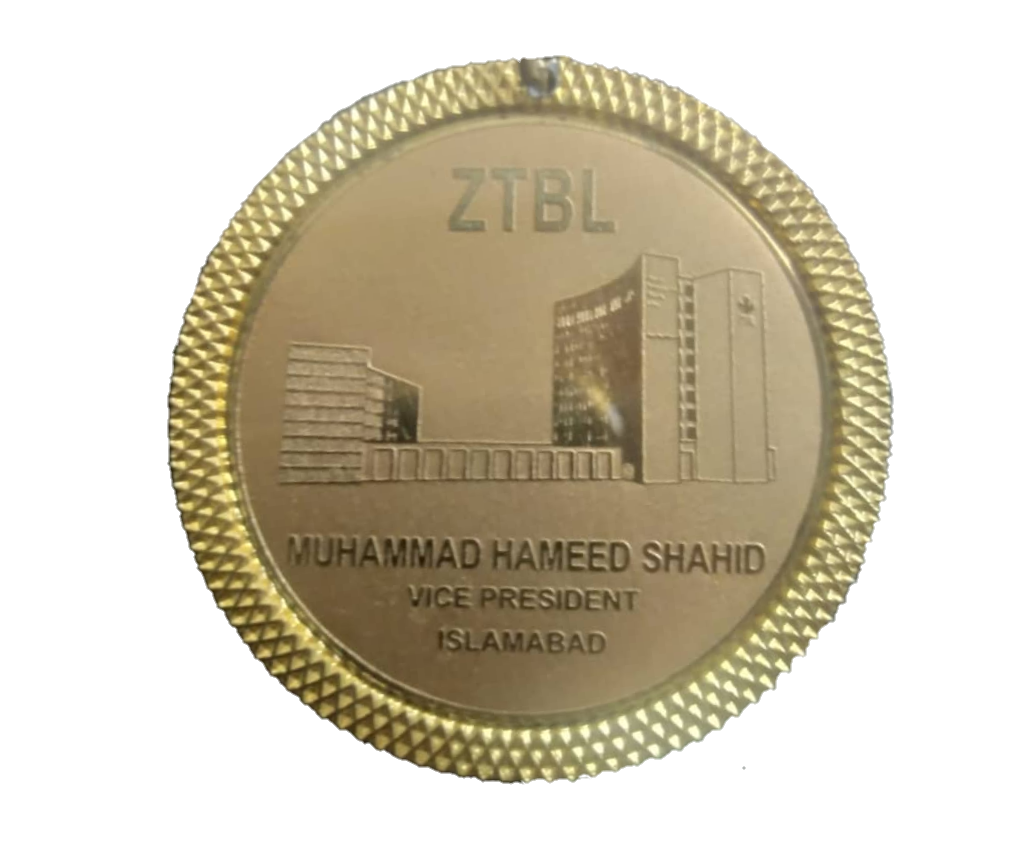
Award by ZTBL

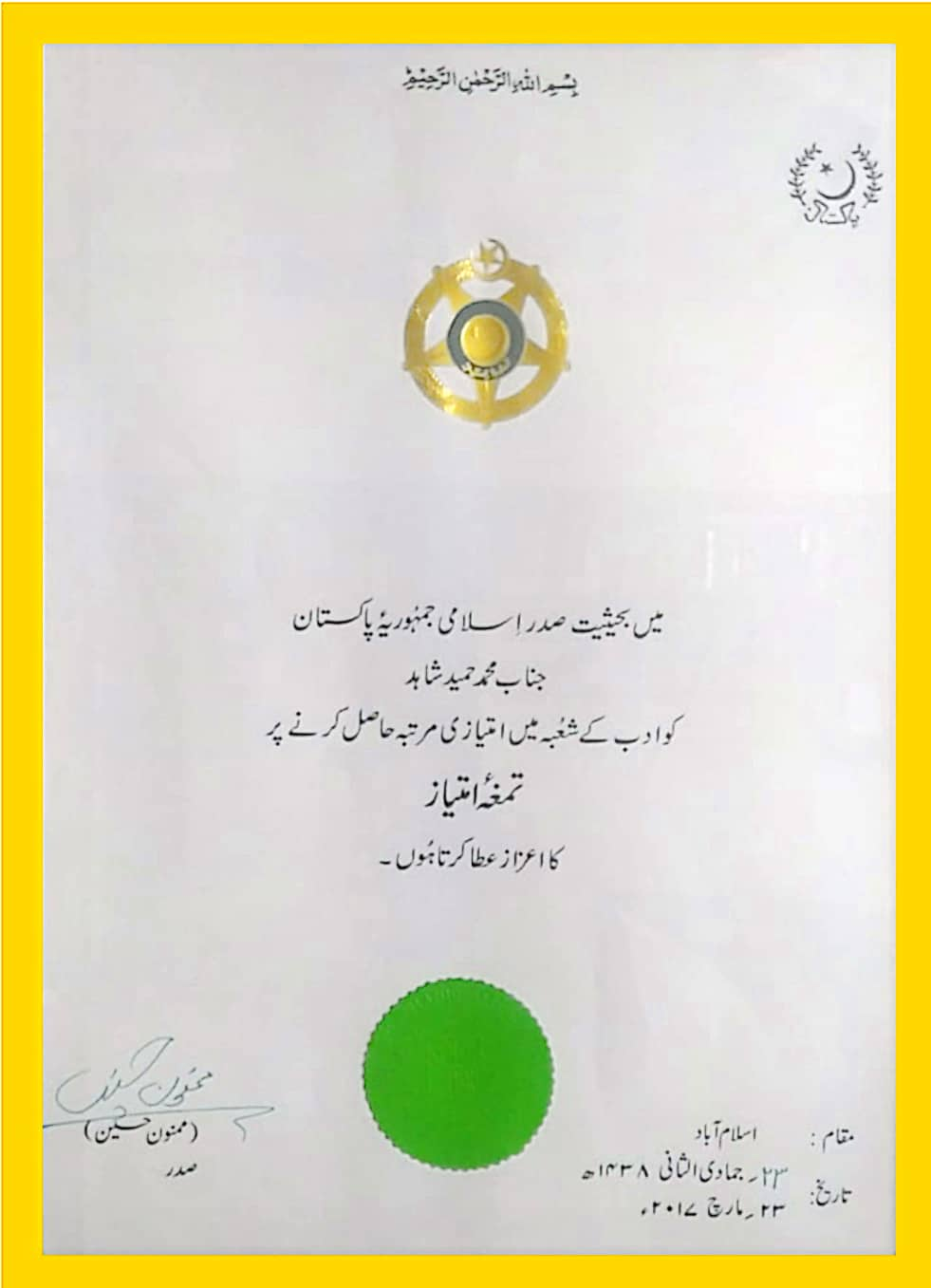
Tamgha-e-Imtiaz

He obtained a banking diploma and also followed a number of courses on banking. He worked as Mobile Credit Officer, Operation Officer, Manager of different bank branches, Zonal Operation Officer, Head Recovery Policy and retired in 2016 while he was Vice President at Head Office Islamabad.

== Literary works ==
Shahid's first writing was published in 1973 when he was a student of Metric. As a university student, Shahid was editor-in-chief of the university literary magazine Kisht-e-Nau and it was in 1988 that he began writing fiction. His first book was published in 1983. His first collection of short stories, entitled Band Ankhoon se Paray was published in 1994, followed by Jannum Jahunam in 1998, Margzaar in 2004, Aadmi and Saans lene main dard hota ha. His novel Mitti Adam Khati Hae was published in 2007.

Shahid has been an associate of several renowned figures such as Iftikhar Arif, Jawayd Anwar, Naseer Ahmed Nasir and others.

In addition, Shahid has authored books of literary criticism such as Adbi Tanaziaat, Ashfaq Ahmad: Shakheiat o funn, Urdu Afsana: Soorat-o-Mana and Urdu Fiction; Naye Mubahis. Shahid also translates international literary writing into Urdu and has written plays for television and columns for print media. Several of his stories have been translated into other languages.

== Books ==
Shahid has published more than 25 books, including Urdu novels, short stories, anthologies and many others.

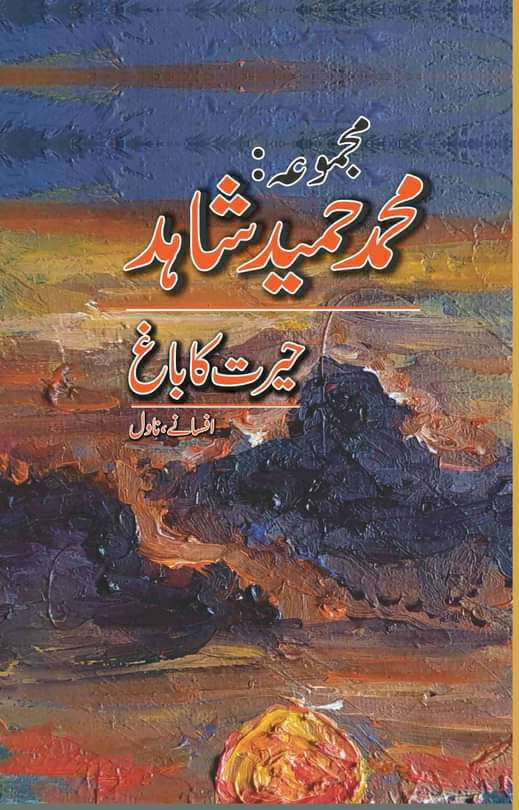
Majmooa Mohammed Hameed Shahid Hairat Ka Bagh collective works of fiction

=== Short story collections ===
- Band Aankhon se Pery (بند آنکھوں سے پرے) 1994
- Janam Jahanam 1998 (جنم جہنم)
- Marg Zaar 2004 (مرگ زار)
- Aadmi 2013 (آدمی)
- Saans lene main dard hota ha 2019 (سانس لینے میں درد ہوتا ہے)

=== Urdu novel ===
- Mitti Aadam Khati Hai (مٹی آدم کھاتی ہے)
- Jang main Mohabbat Ki Tasveer Nahein Banti (جنگ میں محبت کی تصویر نہیں بنتی) 2019 includes in “Saans lene main dard hota ha”

=== Literary criticism ===
- Ashfaq Ahmed: Shakhsiat-o-Fuun (اشفاق احمد شخصیت و فن) 1998
- Aadbi Tanaziaat (ادبی تنازعات) (2000)
- Urdu Afsana: Surat o Mana (اردو افسانہ:صورت و معنیٰ) 2006
- Fateh M. Malik: Shakhsiat-o-Fuun (فتح محمد ملک: شخصیت و فن) 2008
- Kahani aor Llosa sy Muamla (2011(کہانی اور یوسا سے معاملہ
- Rashid, Meeraji, Faiz: Nayab Hein Hum (راشد میراجی،فیض:نایاب ہیں ہم)2015
- Urdu Fiction: Naye Muhabis (اردو فکشن : نئے مباحث)2015
- Manto:Aaj bhi Zinda Ha(منٹو:آج بھی زندہ ہے)2020
- Afsana Kese Likhen (افسانہ کیسے لکھیں)2020
- Hustuju Guftugu (جستجو گفتگو) 2020

=== Other books ===
- Paiker-re-Jamil (Serat un Nabi PBUH) پیکر جمیل(1983)
- Lamhon Ka Lams (Nasmain) لمحوں کا لمس(1995)
- Alif Se Atkhailiyan (Tanziay)الف سے اٹکھیلیاں (1995)

=== Anthologies ===
- Pakistani Aadab (Intekhab 2002) پاکستانی ادب 2003
- SAARC Mumalik: Muntakhib Takhliki Aadab (2004)
- 8th Oct: Tehreer k Aainay Main (2006)
- Majmooa Shams ur Rehman Farooqi (مجموعہ شمس الرحمن فاروقی)2021

== Awards and nominations ==
Shahid has won a total of eight awards.

Year	Award	Result
1995	Syeda Zaheer-un-Nisa Taalimi Award	Won
1997	NCC Golden Jubilee Award	Won
1988	Markaz Award	Won
2000	Nishan-e-Ezaz by Halqa Arbab-e-Zauq	Won
2006	Bakhsh Aadbi Award	Won
2007	Azmat-e-Fan Award	Won
2015	5th UBL Literary Excellence Award	Nominated
2016	6th Literary Excellence Award	Won
2016	Tamgha-e-Imtiaz	Won
