= Upendranath Ashk =

Indian novelist, short story writer and playwright (1910-1996)

- Born: 14 December 1910; Jalandhar, Punjab, British India
- Died: 19 January 1996 (aged 85); Allahabad, Uttar Pradesh, India
- Occupations: novelist, short story writer and playwright
- Children: Neelabh Ashk
- Awards: Sangeet Natak Akademi Award (1965), Soviet Land Nehru Award (1972), Iqbal Award (1996)

Upendranath Sharma "Ashk", (14 December 1910 – 19 January 1996) was an Indian novelist, short story writer and playwright. He was born in Jalandhar, Punjab. In 1933 he wrote his second short story collection in Urdu called Aurat Ki Fitrat, the foreword of which was written by Munshi Premchand. Ashk began his literary career writing in Urdu but he switched to Hindi on the advice of Munshi Premchand. He joined All India Radio in 1941 where Krishan Chander, Patras Bokhari and Saadat Hasan Manto were among his colleagues. He settled in Allahabad in the late 1940s. He was the first Hindi dramatist to receive the Sangeet Natak Akademi Award for playwriting in 1965.

== Biography ==
=== Early life ===
Upendranath Ashk was born Upendranath Sharma to a Saraswat Brahmin family in Jalandhar, Panjab. Ashk began composing Panjabi couplets at the age of 11, and began writing in Urdu in 1926, under the tutelage of the Jalandhari poet Mohammad Ali "Azar". His first Urdu poem was published in the Sunday supplement of the popular Lahore-based Urdu daily Milap. In 1930, while still in college, he published his first collection of short stories, titled Nau Ratan. It was during this phase that he adopted the nom de plume 'Ashk' ('teardrop' in Urdu) in keeping with the Urdu tradition of taking a takhallus. The takhallus was chosen in honour of a childhood friend, whose death left a lasting impression on him. After graduating from college in 1931, Ashk taught at his alma mater for a few months before leaving for Lahore with the poet-journalist Mela Ram "Wafa". For the next three years he worked for Lala Lajpat Rai's newspaper Vande Mataram as a reporter, and then worked his way up as a translator and then assistant editor for the Daily Veer Bharat and the weekly Bhoochal. During this time he continued to publish poems and short stories in local journals. He also married his first wife, Sheela Devi, in 1932. In 1932, on the advice of the celebrated Hindi author Premchand with whom he maintained a correspondence, Ashk switched to writing in Hindi, painstakingly writing each story in Urdu first and then translating it into Hindi. His second collection of short stories, Aurat ki Fitrat, was published in Hindi in 1933, with an introduction by Premchand. In 1934, financial and other problems in his family made Ashk decide that he must adopt a more secure career path. He resolved to study for a law degree and become a sub-judge (magistrate). But just as he completed his degree, his wife, Sheela Devi, died from tuberculosis. In a state of profound grief, Ashk abandoned his plan to enter the legal profession and resolved to become a full-time independent author. At this juncture he also resolved to write realistically about suffering and poverty. In 1936, he published the short story "Ḍāchī" which was considered a milestone in progressive realism in Hindi-Urdu fiction.

His son, Neelabh Ashk, was also a poet and translator.

=== Work for All India Radio ===
In 1941, after living for two years at the commune Preetnagar near Amritsar, where he edited the Hindi-Urdu journal Preet Lari, Ashk was hired at All India Radio (AIR) as a playwright and Hindi adviser.

Other writers associated with AIR at that time included Sa'adat Hasan Manto, Khwaja Ahmad Abbas, Meeraji, Noon Meem Rashid, Krishan Chander and Rajinder Singh Bedi. Also living in Delhi at the time were Hindi authors Agyeya, Shivdan Singh Chauhan, Jainendra Kumar, Banarsi Das Chaturvedi, Vishnu Prabhakar and Girija Kumar Mathur. During this period, Ashk began work on his semi-autobiographical novel Girtī Dīvārẽ ('Falling Walls'). In 1941, Ashk separated from his second wife with whom he had had a short-lived marriage, and married Kaushalya Devi.

=== Work for Filmistan ===
In 1944, Ashk moved to Bombay to write dialogue and screenplays for the production company Filmistan. At Filmistan, Ashk worked closely with Shashdhar Mukherji and the director Nitin Bose. He wrote dialogues, stories and songs and even acted in two films: Mazdoor, directed by Nitin Bose, and Aath Din, directed by Ashok Kumar. While in Bombay, Ashk became involved with IPTA and wrote one of his most noted plays, Tūfān se Pahale, which was produced for the stage by Balraj Sahni. The play, which was critical of communalism, was later banned by the British government. In 1946, Ashk contracted Tuberculosis and in early 1947, he was moved the Bel Air Sanatorium in Panchgani. Ashk remained in the sanatorium for two years, during which time Girtī Dīvārẽ was first published, in 1947, and he also composed his well-known poem "Barghad kī Beṭī".

=== Move to Allahabad ===
In 1948, Ashk and Hindi poet Nirala each received Rs. 5000 from the government of Uttar Pradesh to support them through illness. This enabled Ashk to move to Allahabad, where he lived until his death in 1996.

== Selected works ==
His books include:

=== Novels ===
- Sitārõ Ke Khel (ستاروں کے کھیل, सितारों के खेल), 1937
- Girtī Dīvārẽ (گرتی دیواریں, गिरती दीवारें), 1947
- Garam Rākh (گرم راکھ, गर्म राख), 1952
- Baṛī-Baṛī Ānkhẽ (بڑی بڑی آنکھیں, बड़ी बड़ी आँखें), 1954
- Śahar Mẽ Ghūmtā Āīnā (شہر میں گھومتا آئینہ, शहर में घूमता आईना), 1963

=== Short story collections ===
- Judāī Kī Shām Ke Gīt (جدائی کی شام کے گیت, जुदाई की शाम के गीत), 1933
- Kāle Sāhab (کالے صاحب, काले साहब), 1950
- Sukhi Dali

=== Plays ===
- Jay Parājay (جے پراجے, जय पराजय), 1937
- Swarg Kī Jhalak (سورگ کی جھلک, स्वर्ग की झलक), 1938
- Lakṣmī Kā Swāgat (لکشمی کا سواگت, लक्ष्मी का स्वागत),1941–43
- Qaid (قید, क़ैद), 1943–45
- Uṛān (اڑان, उड़ान), 1943–45
- Alag-Alag Rāste (الگ الگ راستے, अलग अलग रास्ते), 1944–53
- Chaṭhā Beṭā (چھٹا بیٹا, छठा बेटा), 1948
- Anjo Dīdī (انجو دیدی, अंजो दीदी), 1953–54

=== Collections of poems ===
- Dīp Jalegā (دیپ جلے گا, दीप जलेगा), 1950
- Chāndnī Rāt Aur Ajgar (چاندنی رات اور اجگر, चांदनी रात और अजगर), 1952

=== Memoirs ===
- Manṭo Merā Dushman (منٹو میرا دشمں, मंटो मेरा दुश्मन), 1956
- Chehre Anek (چہرے انیک, चेहेरे अनेक), 1985
