= Shahbaz Malik =

Pakistani writer (born 1937)

Shahbaz Malik شہباز ملک
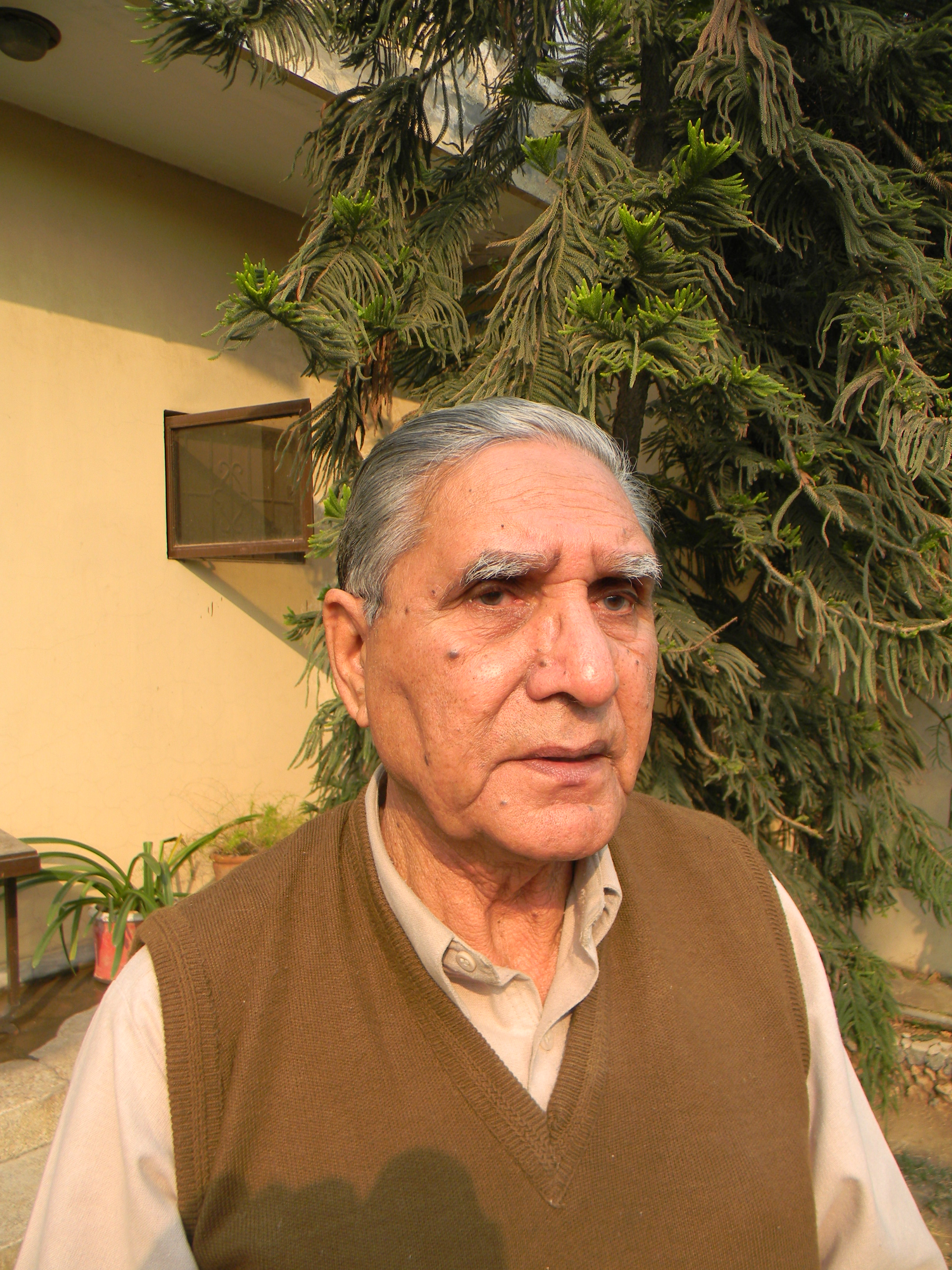
- Born: 3 April 1937 (age 89); Lahore, Punjab, British India
- Died: 11 November 2024; Lahore, Punjab, Pakistan
- Education: University of the Punjab
- Awards: Pride of Performance in 2003 Sitara-i-Imtiaz in 2016
- Scientific career
- Fields: Literature, bibliography, broadcasting
- Workplaces: University of the Punjab

Shahbaz Malik SI PP (Punjabi, Urdu: شہباز ملک; 3 April 1937 – 11 November 2024) was a Pakistani writer, Radio Pakistan broadcaster, Oriental College, Lahore professor, bibliographer and research scholar. He has written 40 books on literature and the Punjabi-language. The government of Pakistan awarded him the Pride of Performance award in 2003 and the Sitara-i-Imtiaz in 2016.

== Early life and education ==
Shahbaz Malik (3 April 1937 – 11 November 2024) was born in Lahore, Punjab. He obtained a master's degree in Punjabi from the University of the Punjab in 1972 and earned a PhD in Punjabi from the same university in 1982.

== Radio Pakistan ==
Malik served as a Punjabi-language broadcaster at Radio Pakistan, Lahore, from 1967 to 1972. During this period, he participated in Punjabi-language radio programming and literary broadcasts.

== Academic career ==
Malik was associated with the University of the Punjab for much of his professional career. He joined the Department of Punjabi as a lecturer in 1975 and subsequently served as assistant professor, associate professor and professor. He later served as chairman of the Department of Punjabi and was subsequently appointed Professor Emeritus.

Following his retirement, he remained active in education and was reported to be teaching Punjabi to probationers of District Management Group at the Civil Services Academy

== Research and literary work ==
Malik devoted several decades to the promotion and study of Punjabi language and literature. In addition to authoring more than forty books, he wrote critical essays, research papers, short stories and poetry. His academic work focused on Punjabi literary history, bibliographical studies and the documentation of Punjabi literature. He was noted for compiling an extensive bibliography of Punjabi books printed in the Persian script, which reportedly documented around 18,000 titles. Following his retirement, he continued to supervise doctoral students and remained active in Punjabi literary scholarship.

== Selected bibliography ==
Selected published works of Shahbaz Malik include:

- Padhray Rah (Punjabi: پدھرے راہ) (1961)
- Ajo Kee Kahani (Punjabi: اجوکی کہانی) (1962)
- Chaanan (Punjabi: چانن) (1962)
- Sokhay Painday (Punjabi: سوکھے پینڈے) (1962)
- Raahey Rah (Punjabi: راہےراہ) (1963)
- So Sianay Iko Mat (Punjabi: سو سیانے اکو مت) (1967)
- Paki Roti (Punjabi: پکی روٹی) (1973)
- Jang Nama Makbul tay Punjabi Marsiya (Punjabi: جنگ نامہ مقبل تے پنجابی مرثیہ) (1974)
- Monh Aayi Gal (Punjabi: منہ آئی گل) (1976)
- Punjabi Lisaniyat (Punjabi: پنجابی لسانیات) (1977)
- Punjabi Kahawatan (Punjabi: پنجابی کہاوتاں) (1977)
- Saaday Akhaan (Punjabi: ساڈے اکھان) (1978)
- Nataray (Punjabi: نتارے) (1979)
- Adabi Mehkan (Punjabi: ادبی مہکاں) (1980)
- Azadi day Mujahid Likhaari (Punjabi: آزادی دے مجاہد لکھاری) (1981)
- Tanqeedi Vichaar (Punjabi: تنقیدی وچار) (1981)
- Chonawan Punjabi Adab (Punjabi: چونواں پنجابی ادب) (1981)
- Raaqab Qasoori dian Natan (Punjabi: راقب قصوری دیاں نعتاں) (1982)
- Jang Nama Pir Muhammad Qasbi (Punjabi: جنگ نامہ پیرمحمد کاسبی) (1982)
- Pakistani Punjabi Adab (Punjabi: پاکستانی پنجابی ادب) (1983)
- Tehreek-e-Pakistan aur Punjabi Adab (Punjabi: تحریک پاکستان اور پنجابی ادب) (1983)
- Molvi Ahmed Yaar, Fiker tay Fun (Punjabi: مولوی احمد یار، فکر تے فن) (1984)
- Gawair (Punjabi: گویڑ) (1985)
- Sassi Punnu, Hafiz Barhurdar (Musalmani) (Punjabi: سسی پنوں، حافظ برخوردار (مسلمانی)) (1987)
- Sassi Punnu, Hafiz Barhurdar (Ranjha) (Punjabi: سسی پنوں، حافظ برخوردار (رانجھا)) (1988)
- Nawain Warkay (Punjabi: نویں ورقے) (1988)
- Punjabi Adabi Jayezay (Punjabi: پنجابی ادبی جائزے) (1989)
- Punjabi Kitabiyaat, Vol. 1 (Punjabi: پنجابی کتابیات، جلد ۱) (1991)
- Vichaar (Punjabi: وچار) (1992)
- Punjabi Adab tay Manzil-e-Pakistan (Punjabi: پنجابی ادب تے منزل پاکستان) (1995)
- Mairian Bharat Phairian (Punjabi: میریاں بھارت پھیریاں) (1996)
- Punjabi Kahawatan (Punjabi: پنجابی کہاوتاں) (2004)
- Siany Kehnday Nay, Vol. 1 (Punjabi: سیانے کہندے نیں، جلد ۱) (2006)
- Roop Rang, Khoj Tey Parakh (Punjabi: روپ رنگ (کھوج تے پرکھ)) (2009)
- Punjabi Kitabiyaat, Vol. 2 (Punjabi: پنجابی کتابیات، جلد ۲) (2015)
- Olaylan (Punjabi: الیلاں) (2017)
- Rawailan (Punjabi: رویلاں) (2017)

== Honours and awards ==
In recognition of his contributions to literature and scholarship, Malik received the Pride of Performance in 2003 and the Sitara-i-Imtiaz in 2016.
