= Oriental College, Lahore =

School in Lahore, Pakistan

Oriental College
- Type: Oriental studies
- Established: 1870
- Principal: Aurel Stein (1888-1899)
- Head: Pundit Navin Chandra Rai (Vice Principal, 1861)
- Location: Lahore
- Campus: Urban

The Oriental College is an institution of oriental studies in Lahore. It is affiliated with the University of the Punjab, Lahore. It is located next to Government College University, Lahore.

It was founded by Adi Brahmo Samaj preacher Pundit Navin Chandra Rai in 1876. He served as its vice principal from 1861. Aurel Stein, the noted Hungarian-British archaeologist, was principal from 1888 to 1899.

== Notable alumni ==
- Anwar Masood (born 1935), poet and educationist
- Faiz Ahmed Faiz (1911–1984), poet and revolutionary
- Shahbaz Malik (1937–2024), writer, bibliographer and research scholar
- Jawayd Anwar (1959–2011), poet and writer
- Khurshid Rizvi (born 1940), poet
- Muhammad Iqbal (1877–1938), philosopher and poet
- Mohan Rakesh (1925-1972), playwright
- Naeem Bokhari (born 1948), lawyer
- Rafiuddin Hashmi (1940–2024), researcher and writer
- Saeed Ahmad Akbarabadi (1908–1985), Islamic scholar
- Shamsul Huda Panchbagi (1897–1988), Islamic scholar and politician.
- Syed Ali Shah Geelani (1929–2021), Kashmiri separatist leader
