= Isabella McNair =

Isabella Taylor McNair (1887- 2 May 1985) was a British educationalist, advocate of women's rights and former principal of Kinnaird College for Women in Lahore.

== Biography ==
She was born in Kilmarnock, Scotland. She graduated with an MA in English from the University of Edinburgh. In 1917 she moved to British India to take up a teacher's post at Women's Christian College in Madras.

In 1928 she was appointed Principal of Kinnaird College for Women in Lahore, Punjab. She was known as a gentle woman, noted for her deliberate manner and soft voice, even when disciplining her students. She promoted religious tolerance, allowing Muslim girls who transferred to Kinnaird in the 1930s to fast during Ramadan. As Principal, McNair advocated ideas of female intellectual equality, and expected alumnae to be active in public life as well as home life, and to "face intelligently the ballot box as well as the kitchen". Under her stewardship, Kinnaird College became one of the most prestigious colleges in British India.

Nair received the prized Kaisar-i-Hind Medal in 1948, in the last honours list of British India. She retired in 1950 and returned to Scotland. In 1958 she was made a Fellow for Life by University of the Punjab. She died in Edinburgh in 1985.
