= Rubina Saigol =

Pakistani feminist scholar (died 2021)

Rubina Saigol (died 27 August 2021) was a Pakistani feminist scholar, educationalist and women's rights activist.

She authored and edited several books and papers in English and Urdu. Her scholarly work explored the themes of gender, education, nationalism, the state, ethnicity, religious radicalism, terrorism, feminism and human rights. She was a senior member of Women Action Forum and co founder of Ajoka Theatre Group.

== Education ==
Saigol held a PhD in education from University of Rochester and her MA in Development Psychology from Columbia University. Her early education was from Kinnaird College for Women University.

== Books and publications ==
Saigol authored various books on the themes of gender, nationalism, identity. Her book ‘The Pakistan Project: A Feminist Perspective on Nation & Identity’, examines ‘the unstable genealogy of this idea of Pakistan from Sir Syed Ahmed Khan and M.A. Jinnah to Zia ul-Haq, through a gendered lens thus exposing its many, often contradictory, premises and assumptions.’

Her scholarly work has appeared in various national and international research journals. Dr. Saigol's publications span diverse themes, ranging from feminism, to gender within educational discourse, to nationalism and counter terrorism. Her work has also been quoted extensively in both scholarly and journalistic publications. Her publications on gender and feminism in Pakistan is recommended as mandatory reading for multiple undergraduate and graduate courses by the Higher Education Commission (HEC) in Pakistan.

== Feminist struggle ==
Dr. Saigol was one of the pioneering members of the Women's Action Forum. She was also on the advisory board of Simrogh, a Pakistan-based non-profit focused on women's rights. Her scholarly work explored various elements of gender identity, politics and struggle in Pakistan. She authored various research and journalistic pieces that attempted to document the history and direction of women rights’ movement in Pakistan. She was a regular contributor to many national journalistic publications including known national news outlets, Herald and The News on Sunday among others. Her journalistic pieces in these publications are almost exclusively focused on themes related to Pakistani women.

She was also a member of the advisory board of Simrogh, a Pakistan-based non profit focused on women's rights.

== Personal life ==
Saigol died from COVID-19 in 2021 at the age of 66.
