= Nida Jay =

Pakistani novelist (born 1985)

- Born: Lahore, Pakistan 2 September 1989
- Occupations: Novelist, educationist
- Writing career
- Language: English language
- Genres: Drama, Self-improvement, Psychology
- Notable work: Heart of Eternity

Nida Jay is a Pakistani novelist who writes in the English language. She is the recipient of numerous international awards, amongst them the Dunnen First Novel Prize. The debut novel Heart of Eternity published by Mirador is a work in the area of philosophical and religious literature. Jay is a Fellow of the Royal Society of Literature and is also a member of the Stanford University group of literary scholars

Jay was born and raised in a Kashmiri family in Lahore. She has an MA in Creative Writing and Literature from Kinnaird College, and an MFA from the MFA Program for Poets & Writers at the University of Reading, where she was influenced by Rumi and Dante. In 2010, she moved to the United Arab Emirates and currently lives in Dubai with her husband and two children. Jay frequently travels to the United Kingdom and Lahore where her family resides.

== Writing career ==
In 2013, Jay published her debut novel Heart of Eternity through Mirador Press in the United Kingdom which found success after its release. Heart of Eternity was shortlisted for the Guardian First Book Award in the Religion and Philosophy category.

Jay described her writing style in an interview with Alan Jacob: "I don't care about philosophies or trends. I don't care about vocabulary. What is important to me is whether the narrative is good or not. My protagonists are experiencing what I experience as I write, which is also what the readers experience as they read. In the nineteenth and early twentieth centuries, writers offered the real thing; that was their task. In War and Peace, Tolstoy describes the battleground so closely that the readers believe it’s the real thing. But that is not my aim. I'm not pretending it’s the real thing. We are living in a fake world; we are fighting a fake war, the existing social order is a swindle and its cherished beliefs are mostly delusions. But we still manage to find reality in all of these."

Jay has appeared on numerous newspapers, podcasts and TV shows including BBC Radio, Voice of America, Webbweaver books, Guardian, New York Times, The Ellen DeGeneres Show, and Khaleej Times. In 2015, she was included in the Granta list of 20 best young British writers.

== Social media ==
Her online community has also grown in recent years. The author has thousands of followers on her Facebook main page and on Twitter. She also has private accounts on Instagram, Pinterest, and Tumblr among others, as well as an Author Blog where she posts frequent updates.
