= Gul Bukhari =

British-Pakistani journalist and columnist

- Born: 19 January 1966 (age 60); Rawalpindi, Pakistan
- Education: Kinnaird College; LUMS
- Spouse: Ali Nadir

Gul Bukhari is a British-Pakistani journalist and columnist. She has been residing in UK since December 2018.

In June 2018, she was abducted for few hours by unknown personnel from Lahore's cantonment area, which has heavy army presence and security checks controlled by the military. A colleague of her alleged that uniformed men were present at her abduction.

== Early life and education ==
Bukhari was born to a military family in 1966. Her father, Major General Rehmat Ali Shah Bukhari, was a Pakistan Army general and was decorated in 1971 for Battle of Bahawalnagar.

Bukhari is a graduate of Kinnaird College for Women and Lahore University of Management Sciences.
