= Parveen Nazar =

Pakistani singer (1950–2011)

Parveen Nazar پروین نظر
- Born: Parveen Begum; 5 June 1950; Ranipur, Sindh, Pakistan
- Died: 19 September 2011 (aged 61) Bahawalpur, Pakistan
- Genres: Kafi
- Occupations: Singer; Folk singer; Classical singer
- Years active: 1970 – 2011
- Spouse: Ustad Nazar Hussain Khan (husband)
- Award: Pride of Performance Award by the President of Pakistan (2009)

Parveen Nazar (Urdu: پروین نظر; 5 June 1950 - 19 September 2011) was a Pakistani folk singer specializing in the Sufi devotional genre of kafi. She was known as The Queen of Kaifi. She was primarily associated with Radio Pakistan and was honored for her contributions to folk music.

She was a respected figure, particularly within the Saraiki cultural belt, and was known for her vocal technique and dedication to classical and spiritual music. Her performances were preserved by the National Institute of Folk and Traditional Heritage, Lok Virsa.

== Early life and training ==
She was born in Ranipur, Sindh, Pakistan. Parveen and her parents then moved to the town of Khanqah Sharif, a suburb of Bahawalpur, in Punjab. She developed an early interest in classical music and received formal training from Ustad Fateh Ali Khan Hyderabadi of the Gwalior Gharana. She came from a background where music and traditional culture were significant. Her practice and dedication to the art form garnered local recognition, with audiences appreciating her powerful voice and distinct style.

Parveen Nazar established herself primarily through live performances across Pakistan. She was a noted performer at various national and regional cultural festivals. The mother of actresses Anjuman and Gori went to a Nazar's performance at a musical event. She liked Nazar's singing and introduced her to a Radio Station director and then the director called her to Radio Pakistan and she sang a folk song there. Then she became a prominent singer at Radio Pakistan.

== Career ==
Nazar began her professional singing career at Radio Pakistan, starting at its stations in Bahawalpur and Multan in 1984. She was renowned for her expressive renditions of kafi, a solo genre based on Sufi poetry. Her repertoire drew from the works of revered Sufi poets, including Khwaja Ghulam Farid, Shah Abdul Latif Bhittai, Bedil Sindhi, Bulleh Shah, and Shah Hussain. In addition to kafi, she performed ghazals and traditional matrimonial songs for Radio Pakistan.

Her dedication and style earned her admiration within the Seraiki community and a strong reputation for classical singing across the country. Her songs, ghazals, and mystical poetry are preserved in the archives of various Radio Pakistan stations and have also been broadcast on Pakistan Television Corporation.

A significant portion of Parveen Nazar's recognition comes from her association with Lok Virsa in Islamabad. She performed full-length concerts and appeared at numerous festivals organized by the institute, which aims to preserve and promote Pakistani folk heritage. These performances were instrumental in bringing her music to a wider audience. She is particularly celebrated for her powerful delivery and ability to connect with the audience during live events. The National Institute of Folk and Traditional Heritage, Lok Virsa, recorded and preserved several of her performances.

== Awards and recognition ==
In March 2009, she was honoured with Pride of Performance Award by the Government of Pakistan for her contributions to music.

The Bahawalpur Arts Council honored Nazar at a ceremony at Rashidiya Hall, where she was "crowned" and presented with prizes by fans and socio-cultural organizations. At another ceremony in Quetta, a former Federal Minister for Water and Power presented her with a gold medal.

== Personal life and death ==
Much of Nazar's kafi work was composed by her husband, the musician Ustad Nazar Hussain Khan. He was a student of classical musician Ustad Umeed Ali Khan and served him in Hyderabad for a decade.

She died in 2011 at Bahawalpur, Pakistan.

== Discography ==
- Kadan Walso Sohna Sanwla
- Nakhat Hain Na Gull Hain
- Dillri Luti Ten Yaar Sajan
- Sohne Yaar Baajo Meri Naeen Sar Si
- Mahi Yaar Di Gharoli
- Mill Mahiwala O Mill Mahiwal
- Sawan Megh Malhran

== Awards and recognition ==
Year	Award	Category	Result	Title	Ref.
2009	Pride of Performance	Award by the President of Pakistan	Won	Arts	
