= Obaidullah Baig =

Pakistani writer (1936–2012)

Obaidullah Baig عبيدالله بيگ
- Born: 1 October 1936; Rampur, British India (now India)
- Died: 22 June 2012 (aged 75); Karachi, Sindh Pakistan
- Occupations: Writer, novelist, columnist, media expert
- Awards: Pride of Performance Award in 2009

Obaidullah Baig (1 October 1936 – 22 June 2012) (Urdu: عبيدالله بيگ) was a scholar, Urdu writer/novelist, columnist, media expert and documentary filmmaker from Karachi, Sindh, Pakistan.

== Personal life ==
Born in Rampur, British India in 1936, Baig migrated to Karachi with his family in the early 1950s following the independence of Pakistan in 1947, and settled in Karachi, Pakistan. Baig had no formal education beyond his intermediate college. He was married to Pakistan Television's announcer and show host, Salma Baig.

== Career ==
Aslam Azhar, Pakistani television's pioneering personality, helped Baig and introduced him to the TV viewing public in Pakistan. Though he is best known for the intellectually stimulating Kasauti (1967), a question-answer quiz TV show in which he teamed up with Iftikhar Arif in the 1970s and then with Ghazi Salahuddin in the 1990s. Kasauti was simply a TV show of 20 questions where 20 questions were allowed to be asked by Obaidullah Baig and his other TV co-panelists from the show host, Quresh Pur, to solve the quiz of the day and come up with the right answer to identify the object or a person. Quizzes on the show were on the subjects of history, current affairs and literature. A major newspaper of Pakistan calls Baig "Pakistan's Google personified" because his show aired at a time when the search engine was not yet born.

In his 48-year-long career, Baig made over 300 documentary films, studying the flora, fauna, and history of Pakistan as well as of Central Asia. His films on wildlife, Lakes of Sindh, Wildlife in Sindh, Game Warden and Life in Stone won major acclaim, as did the TV series Sailani Ke Saath, which ran on Pakistani television in the 1970s for nearly three years.

Obaidullah Baig championed nature and environmental causes. He served as Director National and Regional Languages Cell at the International Union for Conservation of Nature and Natural Resources for six years, where he established Jareeda, Pakistan's first Urdu language magazine focusing on environmental issues.

Prior to this career in television and production, Baig worked as associate editor, ASHUJA Magazine, translator/announcer, external services, Radio Pakistan, as an assistant editor, Daily HURRIYAT (newspaper), and director copywriting, ASIATIC Advertising.

== Awards and recognition ==
- Obaidullah Baig received Pride of Performance Award in 2009 by the President of Pakistan for his services to the Pakistani media.
- Lifetime Achievement Award by Pakistan Television Corporation.

== Death and legacy ==
Obaidullah Baig died on 22 June 2012 in Karachi at age 75.

After Baig's death, paying a tribute to him, Iftikhar Arif, a noted poet and scholar himself, said that Baig played a key role in his life. He added that he considered Baig like an elder brother, friend and a source of inspiration.

In its tribute after Baig's death, another major Pakistani newspaper called him a man with winning humility, undisputed finesse, precise speech and an amiable smile. Many people in Pakistan used to call him 'a living encyclopedia'.
