= Hima Raza =

- Born: 1975; Lahore
- Died: 2003 (aged 27–28); London
- Alma mater: Kinnaird College for Women; University of New South Wales; University of Sussex
- Occupation: Writer, poet
- Employer: Lahore Grammar School; Lahore University of Management Sciences

Hima Fathima Raza (1975–2003) was a Pakistani poet.

== Biography ==
Hima Raza was born in 1975 in Lahore, the daughter of lawyer Raza Kazim and educator Naseem Kazim. She was named for her paternal grandmother, Hima Akhlaque Hussain, an educator and author.

Raza studied at the Kinnaird College for Women in Lahore, the University of New South Wales in Sydney, and the University of Sussex in England. She graduated with an MPhil from the latter and her thesis was entitled A Mohajir's Eye-View: The Politics of Migrant Identity in Salman Rushdie's Diasporic Fiction. She taught at Lahore Grammar School and the Lahore University of Management Sciences.

Raza published two books of poetry, Memory Stains (2001) and Left Hand Speak (2002). Her verse has often been described as experimental. Muneeza Shamsie writes that Raza's work "revealed a rare talent and forged new directions in Pakistani-English poetry during her short lifetime." In Left Hand Speak, she published bilingual poetry in English and Urdu, using both Arabic and Roman scripts.

Raza died in 2003 following a hit and run accident in Hyde Park.

== Bibliography ==
- Memory Stains: A Collection of Short Verse. London: Minerva Press, 2001.
- Left Hand Speak: A Collection of Verse. Islamabad: Alhamra, 2002.
- Raza, Hima (2003). "Unravelling Sharam : Narrativisation as a political act in Salman Rushdie's shame". Wasafiri. 18 (39): 55–61. doi:10.1080/02690050308589850. ISSN 0269-0055.
