= Nasreen Askari =

Author and curator

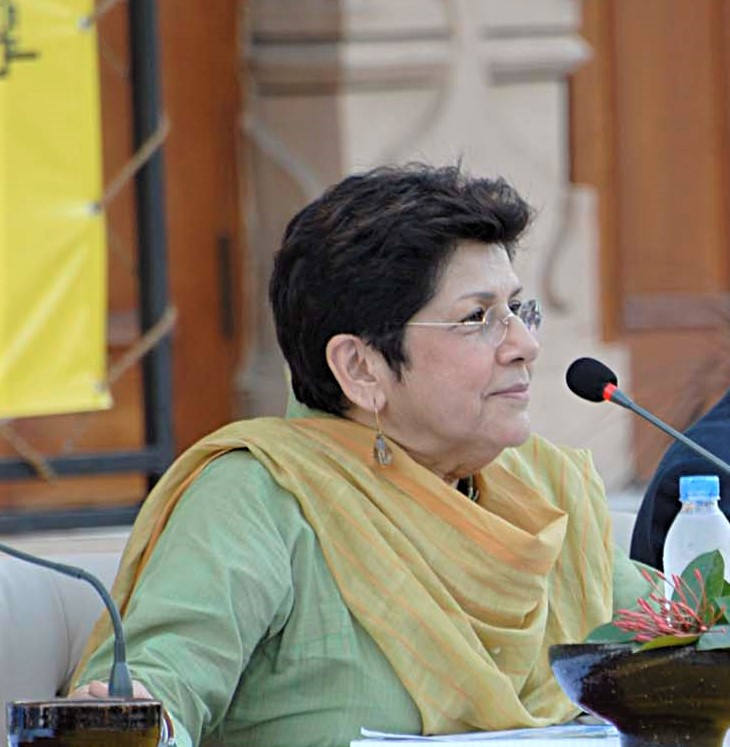
Photograph of the Director of Mohatta Palace Museum, Karachi

Nasreen Askari is an author, curator, director and co-founder of the Mohatta Palace Museum in Karachi. Nasreen Askari has curated over 25 exhibitions at the Mohatta, now widely regarded as one of the leading museums in South Asia. In addition, she has co-curated exhibitions at the Victoria & Albert Museum in London, the National Museum of Scotland in Edinburgh and the Paisley Museum in Glasgow. She received the President of Pakistan’s Pride of Performance Award in 2008 for her services to the arts and culture of Pakistan.

== Personal life ==
=== Early life ===
Nasreen Askari was born in Karachi in 1950, the youngest of six siblings, to parents who had migrated from India in 1946. She was educated at the Karachi Grammar School which she joined at the age of five and graduated as Head of School in 1968. She studied dental surgery at the Sind University, Jamshoro and graduated in 1973 with honours. After a year at the Jinnah Post Graduate Medical Hospital, Karachi as a junior surgeon, she left for London for post graduate qualifications in 1975.

In London, she met Hasan Askari, and they were married in Karachi in October 1976.

=== 1977-1997 ===
As her husband was an investment banker, Nasreen's career was affected by his travels. The couple left for Hong Kong in late 1980 (where she re-qualified as a dentist). In 1985, when her husband was transferred to Tokyo and she was expected to re-qualify again as a dentist, she gave up the profession and enrolled at Sophia University, Tokyo to study Asian Art and Civilisation. During this time, Iman, her son and Sehr, her daughter, were born. While in Tokyo, she added Japanese to her repertoire of languages which include Urdu, Gujarati and French in addition to English.

== Career ==
=== Colours of the Indus ===
Nasreen's interest in textiles was first kindled while a student in Jamshoro, Sindh where she began her collection. By 1997, she had a formidable personal collection of textiles from all over Pakistan with a focus on Sindh. In 1997, on the occasion of the fiftieth anniversary of the founding of Pakistan, she was asked to co-curate the first ever exhibition on Pakistani costume and textiles in the United Kingdom. The exhibition opened at the Victoria & Albert Museum, London to critical acclaim in October 1997. Initially scheduled to run for three months, it was extended by popular demand to seven months and subsequently travelled to the National Museum of Scotland, Edinburgh. The accompanying publication had two re-prints, was an Arts Book Club selection and is still in print, as the seminal work on the textiles of the country.

The most significant aspect of this exhibition and the accompanying publication was, that for the first time, it identified textiles from the regions comprising Pakistan as being distinct from neighboring areas. It went further by arguing that Pakistan was the crucible where the textile traditions of Central Asia and South Asia melded to influence each other. Before this, the textiles of Pakistan were subsumed into a generic 'Indian' category. This distinctiveness is now widely accepted.

=== Mohatta Palace Museum ===
In 1998, Nasreen Askari was invited by the Trustees of the Mohatta Palace to return to Karachi to establish the Mohatta Palace Museum. She continues as the Director of the Museum. Its first exhibition, Treasures of the Talpurs, opened on September 15, 1999 and since then, the Museum has held approximately twenty five exhibitions.

Her latest book, The Flowering Desert, has been well received by critics and was chosen as one of the twelve books of the year in 2020 by the Crafts Council of the U.K. It was also longlisted for an annual Book Award in 2019 by the Textile Society of America.

== Publications (either as author, co-author or editor) ==
- Colours of the Indus: Costumes and Textiles of Pakistan (London, 1997)
- Uncut Cloth (London, 1999)
- Treasures of the Talpurs (Karachi, 1999)
- Gandhara: The Art of Divinity (Karachi, 2000)
- Jamil Naqsh: A Retrospective (Karachi, 2003)
- Textiles from India: The Global Trade (Calcutta, 2003; article)
- Tale of the Tile: The Ceramic Traditions of Pakistan (Karachi, 2011; reprinted 2019)
- Thar (Karachi, 2017)
- The Flowering Desert: Textiles from Sindh (London, 2019)
- Berg Encyclopedia of World Dress and Fashion (Berg Publisher, Oxford and New York, 2010) article in volume 4 on Pakistan.
- Bloomsbury Encyclopedia of Worlds Textiles (Bloomsbury, London to be published 2023) article on Pakistan volume on Embellishment.

An important aspect of Nasreen Askari's books is that several of them are now accepted as the standard reference work on traditional Pakistani textiles. Her publications are now regularly used by all three international auction houses to authenticate items on sale. In this respect, Nasreen Askari has tried to establish a tradition of rigorous scholarship for publications from Pakistan.

== Awards ==
- Shah Abdul Latif Bhitai Medal, 2005
- Pride of Performance Award by the President of Pakistan, 2008

== See also ==
- Mohatta Palace Museum
- Pride of Performance
