= Kinnaird College for Women =

University in Lahore, Pakistan

- دانشگاه خواتین کنیئرڈ
- Motto: "Light to guide us, courage to support us and love to unite us"
- Type: Public (autonomous)
- Established: 1913
- Principal: Dr. Iram Anjum
- Location: Lahore, Punjab, Pakistan
- Campus: Urban
- Mascot: KCite
- Website: kinnaird.edu.pk

The Kinnaird College for Women (KCW) is a university located in Lahore, Pakistan. It is a women's liberal arts university.

Kinnaird was established in 1913 by the Zenana Bible and Medical Mission. In 1919, Presbyterian Mission Church and the Church Mission Society joined a consortium to fund and operate the college. In 1926, it moved to its current campus on the Jail Road, where it grew over the years. By 1939, the college had grown into a 81,000-square-metre (20-acre) campus.

The college is named after Lady Mary Jane Kinnaird, co-founder of YWCA and a great philanthropist of her time. The now university was established at the start of the 20th century when it was housed near Kinnaird High School. In 2002, college was given the status of government degree awarding institution and its administration was handed over to Association of Kinnaird College. Its board of governors run its administration.

== History ==
Kinnaird College was founded in 1913 by the Zenana and Bible Medical Mission when they started college classes at Kinnaird Christian Girls' High School in Lahore. The founders wished to give Punjabi Christian women the opportunity to gain professional qualifications as teachers. The first principal was Joan MacDonald.

From 1913 to 1922, the college was the only women's liberal arts college in the Punjab. In its initial years, college life was designed for the predominately Christian student body and on graduation many students found employment in the mission school network. The popularity of missionary schools among non-Christian families, with their emphasis on English language teaching and the chance to study with British and American teachers, led to a demand for the type of graduate teachers produced by the college.

In 1928, Isabella McNair became principal of the college. McNair believed that women's education should be intellectually equal to men's and alumnae encouraged to be active in public life. During the 1930s, admission standards, teacher/pupil ratios, extracurruclar activities and a fee schedule set Kinnaird apart as the region's most prestigious women's college. The demographics had also shifted with a majority of pupils now coming from middle to upper class Hindu families, where an English education from a leading women's college was regarded as an important step in arranging a good marriage.

After Partition in 1947, the University of the Punjab Senate decided to replace English with Urdu as the medium of instruction and examination for higher education. Despite this change, Kinnaird continued to offer women higher education in newly created Pakistan and added science courses, typing, nursing and social work to its curriculum. Partition however significantly altered the student body, with Muslims, a minority at Kinnaird before 1947, now becoming a large majority.

In 1972, the Pakistani government nationalised all private schools and colleges, including Kinnaird. In 2002, the Government of Punjab chartered Kinnaird as a degree-awarding institution. A board of governors was set up to run its administration.

== Degrees and courses ==
Kinnaird launched its honors program in 2003, the four year bachelors followed by a dissertation. An honors degree is available in the following subjects:

- Biochemistry
- Botany
- English Literature
- English Language and Linguistics
- Environmental Science
- Statistics
- Food and Nutrition
- Psychology
- Physics
- French
- Political Science
- Law
- Media Studies
- International Relations
- Urdu
- Business Administration
- Zoology
- Geography
- Economics
- Mathematics
- Computer Science
- Biotechnology

One and two year master's degrees are available in the following:

- English Literature
- Environmental Science
- International Relations
- English Literature
- English Language Teaching
- Business Administration
- Media Studies

M.Phil. degree offered in:

- Computer Science
- Statistics
- Environmental Science
- English Literature
- International Relations
- English Language Teaching

== Radio Kinnaird 97.6 FM ==
Radio Kinnaird 97.6 FM is a campus radio of Kinnaird College for Women University. The test transmission of this radio channel was started in June 2010.

== Principals ==
- 1913-1928: Joan McDonald
- 1928-1950: Isabella McNair
- 1950-1969: Mangat Rai
- 1972-2004: Mira Phailbus
- 2004-2005: Ira Hasan
- 2005-2009: Mira Phailbus
- 2009-2010: Bernadette Louise Dean
- 2010-2024: Rukhsana David
- 2024–present: Dr. Iram Anjum

== Notable alumni ==
- Fawzia Afzal-Khan, professor
- Zubeida Agha, artist
- Vaneeza Ahmad, model, actress
- Sheherezade Alam, ceramist
- Gurbinder Kaur Brar, politician
- Sana Bucha, journalist and TV anchor
- Gul Bukhari, journalist
- Bushra Anjum Butt, politician
- Madeeha Gauhar, actress
- Maha Raja, lawyer, politician
- Muneeza Hashmi, actress
- Farzana Hassan, author and activist
- Shamim Hilaly, actress
- Tasneem Zehra Husain, theoretical physicist
- Nasira Iqbal, judge
- Zeb Jaffar, politician
- Asma Jahangir, lawyer and activist
- Kanza Javed, author
- Nida Jay, author, educationist
- Kamini Kaushal, actress
- Juggan Kazim, actress, TV presenter
- Sara Raza Khan, singer
- Hadiqa Kiani, singer
- Sabeen Mahmud, human rights activist
- Jugnu Mohsin, journalist
- Savera Nadeem, actress
- Afia Nathaniel, writer, director, producer
- Musarrat Nazir, musician, actress
- Bano Qudsia, author
- Zainab Qayyum, model, actress, TV presenter
- Hima Raza, poet
- Huma Anwar, Translator and Editor
- Begum Akhtar Riazuddin, activist, author
- Irtiza Rubab, actress
- Shunila Ruth, politician
- Ayesha Sana, actress, host
- Rubina Saigol, activist, educationalist
- Shabnam Shakeel, poet
- Ayesha Siddiqa, political scientist
- Bapsi Sidhwa, author
- Sara Suleri, author, professor
- Tahira Syed, ghazal singer
- Kashmala Tariq, politician
- Shahzadi Umerzadi Tiwana, politician
- Naseem Zehra, journalist, anchor
