= Neelabh Ashk =

Indian Hindi language poet, journalist, and translator (1945-2016)

Neelabh Ashk (16 August 1945 – 23 July 2016) was an Indian Hindi language poet, journalist, and translator. He published various poetry collections. He is best known for translating the works of notable authors like Arundhati Roy, Salman Rushdie, William Shakespeare, Bertolt Brecht, and Mikhail Lermontov.

== Personal life ==
Neelabh was born in Mumbai on 16 August 1945. His father was Hindi writer Upendranath Ashk. He graduated in Commerce and completed his master's degree from Department of Hindi, Allahabad University. Both the times he scored first positions in his batch of 60s. In 1980, he started working with BBC London's foreign broadcasting department of Hindi as a producer for four years. His published 24 poems on his experiences in London in the London Diary Series. He returned to India in 1984 and continued working as a poet and writer, translator. He also handled work of their publishing house which was named after him as "Neelabh Prakashan".

Ashk married two times. He separated from his first wife, after she died, he married second time girl named Bhumika Dwivedi Ashk, another writer, artist and social worker . He left his parental home of Allahabad and moved to Delhi. Ashk died at his Delhi residence on the morning of 23 July 2016 after a long illness at the age of 70. His funeral took place the same afternoon at Nigam Bodh Ghat. Various authors and writer's associations expressed grief on his death. On his death, contemporary Hindi poet Manglesh Dabral said that he lived an "unfulfilled life" and praised his "deep knowledge" of the English, Hindi, Urdu, and Punjabi languages. Vishwanath Prasad Tiwari, chairperson of Sahitya Akademi called him "a revolutionary poet".

== Works ==
Ashk translated Arundhati Roy's Booker Prize winning novel The God Of Small Things to Hindi as Mamuli Cheezon Ka Devta. He also translated Salman Rushdie's The Enchantress of Florence, as well as various works of William Shakespeare and German playwright Bertolt Brecht. His translation of A Hero of Our Time, originally written by Russian author Mikhail Lermontov, was published as Hamare Yog Ka Ek Nayak, and Shakespeare's King Lear was published as Pagla Raja. Brecht's popular play Mother Courage and Her Children was rendered into Hindi as Himmat Mai. Ashk also translated poems of Indian poets Jeevanand Das and Sukanta Bhattacharya and foreign poets Nâzım Hikmet, Ernesto Cardenal, Pablo Neruda, Nicanor Parra, and Ezra Pound.

Ashk authored a popular book called Hindi Sahitya Ka Maukhik Itihaas published by Mahatma Gandhi Antarrashtriya Hindi Vishwavidyalaya. He also maintained a blog "Neelabh ka Morcha". He edited the periodicals Natrang and Rang-Prasang, the later being published by the National School of Drama. He also wrote scripts for television, radios, and plays.

His first poetry collection, Sansmarnarambha, was published in the 1970s and was well received. His Hindi poetry collections are:

- Jungle Khamosh Hai
- Uttaradhikaar
- Shok Ka Sukh
- Shabdo Se Naata Atoot Hai
- Ishvar Ka Moksh
- Apne Aap Se Lambi Baatcheet
- Cheezein Upasthit Hain
- Khatra Agle Mod Ke Uss Taraf Hain
