= Ruheena Malik =

Pakistani calligrapher

- Born: Ruheena Malik; Karachi, Pakistan
- Other name: Rubeena Malik
- Education: Convent of Jesus and Mary, Karachi
- Occupations: Calligrapher, Painter
- Years active: 1996–present
- Children: 3
- Honours: Pride of Performance (2009)

Ruheena Malik is a Pakistani calligrapher and artist known for her distinctive style that merges traditional Islamic calligraphy with modern art movements like Cubism. Her work often features Quranic verses and is created on a variety of media, including carved wood, canvas, and antiques. She was awarded the Pride of Performance by the Government of Pakistan for her contributions to the arts.

== Early life and education ==
Ruheena Malik was born in Karachi to a Pakistani father and a half-Danish mother. She received her early education in Karachi at the Convent of Jesus and Mary before moving to London, where she earned a bachelor's degree in textiles.

== Career ==
After her marriage, Malik took a long break from art. She re-engaged with her artistic passion by exploring calligraphy while living in Copenhagen with her mother, after her children had started boarding school. She formally returned to the Pakistani art scene in 1996. Malik formerly co-owned the restaurant Copper-Kettle in Karachi, where she held her first exhibition of calligraphic work, featuring 40 pieces on paper and ink. She later established her own art gallery in Pakistan.

Her calligraphy has been presented to prominent figures, including Saudi King Abdullah bin Abdul Aziz al Saud and UAE President Khalifa bin Zayed Al Nahyan.

Ruheena's solo exhibitions include "Kalaam" at Mohatta Palace in 1999 and a 2005 show at the Alliance Francaise. In March 2013, she held an exhibition at the Quaid-e-Azam House. She has also participated in group exhibitions with other Pakistani artists and shown her work internationally, including in Paris.

In 2021, she was invited by owners of the clothing store Niazis to display her artwork there.

In recognition of her artistic contributions, Malik was awarded the Pride of Performance by the Pakistani government in 2009.

== Personal life ==
She is married and has three children.

== Awards and recognition ==
Year	Award	Category	Result	Title	Ref.
2009	Pride of Performance	Award by the President of Pakistan	Won	Arts	

== Style ==
Malik's art is deeply spiritual and inspired by the Quran. Her unique style is a fusion of traditional Arabic script with Cubist elements, creating a three-dimensional effect in her carvings. She works with several traditional scripts, including Kufic, Thulth, Naskhi, and Nastaliq. Her materials are diverse, ranging from carved wood and canvas to repurposed antiques like old doors, wooden panels, and tiles from historic havelis (mansions) across Sindh. Her works are presented in vertical, horizontal, and circular formats.
