= Shabnam Shakeel =

Award winning Pakistan Writer

- Born: 12 March 1942; Lahore, Pakistan
- Died: 2 March 2013 (aged 70); Karachi
- Occupations: Academician, poet

Shabnam Shakeel (Urdu: شبنم شکیل ALA-LC: S̱ẖabnam S̱ẖakīl IPA: [ʃəbnəm ʃəkiːl]; 12 March 1942 – 2 March 2013) was a Pakistani poet, writer, and academician. Shabnam spent her early life in Lahore, Pakistan, and received a master's degree in Urdu literature. During her career, she worked as a lecturer at several colleges in Pakistan. Her first book Tanqeedi Mazameen, was published in 1965. She won numerous awards, honours and titles for her contributions to Urdu literature including the prestigious Presidential Pride of Performance award in 2005.

== Biography ==
Shabnam was born on 12 March 1942 in Lahore, Pakistan. Her father Syed Abid Ali Abid was a poet and academician and thus she was given the opportunity to grow up in a literary environment and was exposed to notable people such as Ghulam Mustafa Tabassum and Faiz Ahmad Faiz. She was a student at Kinnaird College and graduated from Islamia College, both in Lahore. She received a Master of Arts degree in Urdu literature from Oriental College, Lahore.

After finishing her studies, she joined Queen's Mary College, Lahore as a professor of Urdu language and literature. For the next 30 years, she worked as a teacher at different colleges in Pakistan such as Lahore College for Women University, Government Girls College, Quetta, and Federal Government College F-7/2 in Islamabad.

In 1967, she married Syed Shakeel Ahmad who was a civil servant. The couple had two sons, Waqar Hasnain Ahmad and Jehanzeb Ahmad, and one daughter Malahat Awan.

Shabnam died on 2 March 2013 in Karachi. Her Namaz-e-Janaza was offered in F-11 Graveyard in Islamabad on March 3.

Prime Minister Raja Pervaiz Ashraf gave his condolences to the family in a message expressing his grief over her death.

== Literary works ==
Her first book, Tanqeedi Mazameen was published in 1965. Some of her other published poetry collections were Shabzaad (1987), Izteraab (1994), Taqreeb Kuch Tau (2003) and Musafat Raigan Thi (2008).

=== Bibliography ===
- Tanqeedi Mazameen, 1965, Classic Publishers, Lahore
- Shabzad (Poetic Collection), 1987, Maavra Publishers Lahore
- Iztaraab (Poetic Collection), 1994, Sangemeel Publishers, Lahore
- Taqreeb Kuch Tau (Critics/penpictures of personalities), 2003, Sangemeel Publishers, Lahore
- Na Qafas Na Ashiana (Short Stories), 2004, Sangemeel Publishers, Lahore
- Musafat Raigan The (Poetic Collection), Sangemeel Publishers, Lahore
- Khawateen ki Shaaeeri (1947 to 2002) aur Muasharay par iskay asarat (sponsored by M/O Women Development)
- Hasrat Mohani Ka Taghazzul (in press)

== Awards ==
The following is a list of awards bestowed upon Shabnam during her literary career:

- President's Pride of Performance Award, 2005
- Awards of Recognition – Hamdard Foundation, 1994
- Bolan Award (Shabzad – Poetic Collection), 1988
- Govt. of Baluchistan's Award for Country's Prominent Women
- Shabnam Shakeel ki Shakhsiat aur Shaairy (Research Paper) by Mubashira Nasreen, Urdu Department, N.U.M.L. (2000)
- Various awards by prominent social and literary organizations of Pakistan
- Life Member, Pakistan Academy of Letters
- Member PTV Censor Board Channel 3
- Member scholarships committee, Pakistan Academy of Letters
- Member Punjab Public Library Board, Lahore
- Member Jury (Award) Radio Pakistan, PTVC Perveen Shakir Trust & Academy of Letters Hijra Awards
- Bhaha-ud-Din Zakriya University Multan's research paper: Shabnam Shakeel ki shakhsiat aur funn (M.Phil.)
- Lahore University of Management Sciences has included her poetry in its management sciences BSc honors course.
