= Meeraji =

Urdu writer (1912–1949)

Miraji
- Born: Mohammad Sanaullah Dar; 25 May 1912; Punjab, British India
- Died: 3 November 1949 (aged 37); Bombay, India
- Occupation: Urdu poet
- Writing career
- Pen name: Miraji
- Genres: Ghazal, Nazm, Free verse
- Literary movement: Progressive Writers Association

Mohammad Sanaullah Dar (25 May 1912 – 3 November 1949), better known as Miraji was an Indian Urdu poet. He lived the life of a bohemian, working only intermittently.

== Early life ==
Born into a Kashmiri family of Gujranwala and named Mohammed Sanaullah Dar, he passed his childhood days in Kucha Sardar Shah, Mozang, Lahore. His father, Munshi Mohammad Mahtabuddin, was a railway engineer, so his family had to often move from one place to another. He lived in Kathiawar, Bostan (Baluchistan), Sanghar and Jacobabad.

Miraji began composing poetry, under the pseudonym of Sasri, when he was at school. It was from his later encounter with a Bengali girl, Mira Sen, who was a daughter of an accounts officer serving in Lahore, that he fell deeply in love. This left a permanent trace in his life that he adopted his pen name on her name. Though brought up in affluent surroundings, Miraji left his home and family and chose to lead the life of a homeless wanderer, mostly staying with his friends and making a living by selling his songs. Julien Columeau, a French novelist who also writes in Urdu and Hindi has authored a very unusual but engaging short novel on the life of Miraji.

== Literary life ==
Miraji was associated with Adabi Duniya (Lahore), and later worked for All India Radio, Delhi. He wrote literary columns for the monthly Saqi (Delhi) and for a short period helped editing Khayal (Bombay). After Partition, he settled permanently in Bombay.

From his teenage days, Miraji felt attracted towards Hindu mythology. He often used Hindi vocabulary in his poetry, prose and letters. He acknowledged his debt to the Sanskrit poet Amaru and the French poet Baudelaire. He also translated certain works of the Sanskrit poet, Damodar Gupta and of the Persian poet, Omar Khayyam.

Miraji is considered to be one of the pioneers of symbolism in Urdu poetry, and especially introducing Free Verse. Along with N. M. Rashid, he was a leading poet of the group Halqa-e Arbab-e Zauq, which broke away from the classic convention of radeef and qafia, explored the rich resources of blank verse and Free Verse, rejected the confines of the socially "acceptable" and "respectable" themes, rejected the stranglehold of Persianised diction, and explored with sensitivity and skill, the hitherto forbidden territories of sexual and psychological states. He also wrote illuminating criticism of poetry and yearned to alter the expression of his age.

== Works ==
Miraji's literary output was immense but he published very little of his poetry during his lifetime. However, Khalid Hasan, in his article "Meera Sen's forgotten lover," records that during Miraji's lifetime four collections of Miraji's works were published by Shahid Ahmed Dehlavi, and one by Maktaba-e-Urdu, Lahore. His complete works Kulliyat-e-Miraji appeared only in 1988 edited by Dr. Jameel Jalibi.Dr Jameel Jalibi again edited the Kulliyat and published in 1994 from Lahore with all his remaining works. Another collection titled Baqiyat-e-Miraji was edited by Sheema Majeed in 1990. A book titled "Iss Nazm Mein" containing Essays of Miraji was published during his lifetime.

List of works:

1. "Geet he Geet" (songs)
2. "Miraji ke Geet" (Poems)
3. "Miraji ki Nazmen"(Poems)
4. "Teen Rang" (Poems)
5. "Iss Nazm Mein" (Literary criticism)
6. "Kulliyat-e-Miraji" (Poems) compiled by Altaf Gauhar and published by Dr. Jameel Jalibi, Urdu Markaz U.K.
7. "Baqiyat-e-Miraji" (Poems) edited by Sheema Majeed and published by Pakistan Books and Literary Sounds, Lahore.
8. "Intikhab-e-kalaam"
9. "Pratinidhi Shairy"
10. "Seh Aatishah (poems)
11. "Mashriq o Maghrib ke Naghmay
12. "Paband Nazmen (poems)
13. "Miraji ki Nazmen," edited by Anees Nagi (poems)
14. "Nigar Khana" (translation)
15. "Khemay ke aas paas" (translations)
16. "Nagri nagri phira musafir ghar ka rasta bhool gaya," sung By Ghulam Ali

== Personality ==
Miraji adopted a deliberately outlandish style in his dress, sporting long hair, a dagger-like mustache, oversize earrings, colorful headgear, an amulet and a string of beads around his neck. Mehr Lal Soni Zia Fatehabadi, his poet friend and former class fellow, recalled that the only time Miraji trimmed his long hair was when he joined All India Radio, New Delhi.

== Death ==
Akhtar ul Iman, his poet friend, who was himself influenced by Miraji and Noon Meem Rashid, and with whom Miraji spent the last days of his life in Poona and Bombay, reported that his excessive drinking, cigarette-smoking, and sexual dissipation had drained away his strength and damaged his liver. Then, there came the additional agony of his psychic ailment, for which he had to be admitted to hospital where he was given electric shocks to cure him of his insanity—a treatment which he dreaded. The end came at 4 p.m. on 3 November 1949, in King Edward Memorial Hospital in Bombay.

== Works on Miraji ==
- "Miraji" a monograph on the Urdu poet written by Shafey Kidwai.
- "Miraji : Shakhsiyat aur Funn" - Doctoral dissertation of Dr. Rashid Amjad.
- "Miraji aur Amli Tanqeed" published by Mah-e-Nau, Lahore in May, 1979. A study of Miraji's methods of literary criticism.
- "A dense tranquillity, a harsh solitude: the ‘un-natural’ modernism of Miraji" by Judhajit Sarkar, Journal of South Asian History and Culture, Vol. 15, Issue 3 (2024). https://www.tandfonline.com/doi/pdf/10.1080/19472498.2024.2371246.

== See also ==
- Shabnam Shakeel
