= Iftikhar Arif =

Pakistani poet and litterateur (born 1944)

Iftikhar Arif NI HI SI PP
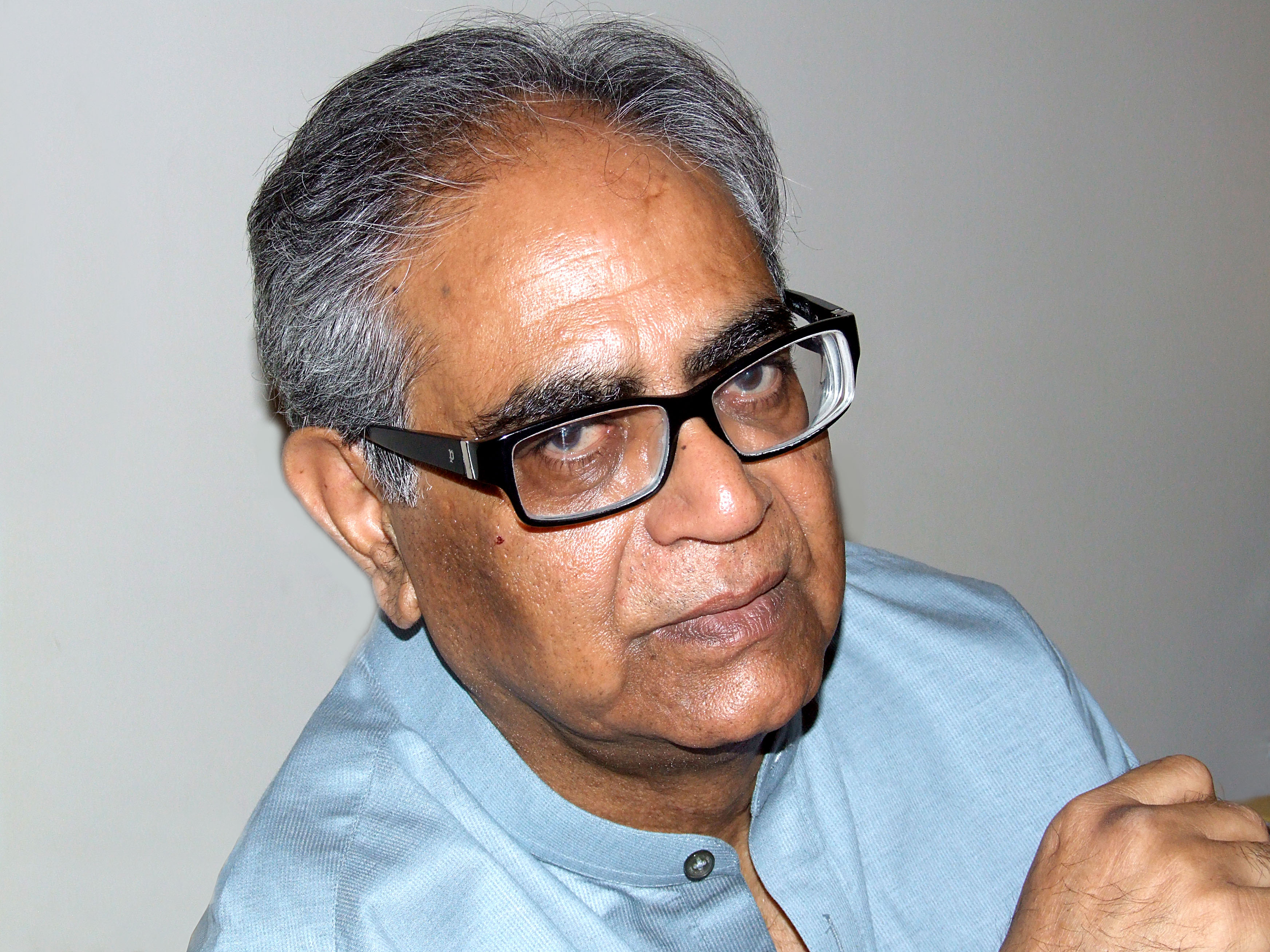
- Born: Iftikhar Hussain Arif; 21 March 1944 (age 82); Lucknow, United Provinces, British India
- Education: University of Lucknow, New York University
- Occupation: Urdu poet
- Writing career
- Notable works: Mehr-i-Doneem, Harf-i-Baryab, Jahan-e-Maloom, Kitab-i-Dil-o-Dunya
- Notable awards: Faiz International Award (1988); Waseeqa-e-Etraaf (1994); Baba-e-Urdu Award (1995); Naqoosh Award (1994); Pride of Performance (1990); Sitara-e-Imtiaz (1999); Hilal-e-Imtiaz (2005); Nishan-e-Imtiaz (2023)

Iftikhar Hussain Arif (Note: Urdu: افتخار حسین عارف) (born 21 March 1944) is a Pakistani poet and litterateur of Urdu. His main theme is romantic Urdu poetry. He is a former chairman of the Pakistan Academy of Letters (PAL) and the National Language Authority.

Arif is widely considered one of the leading contemporary Urdu poets, and has received the Nishan-e-Imtiaz, Hilal-e-Imtiaz, Sitara-e-Imtiaz, and Presidential Pride of Performance awards, the highest literary awards given by the Government of Pakistan.

== Early life and career ==
Iftikhar Arif (left) with fellow writers Hameed Shahid (center) and Jawayd Anwar (right) in November 2011

Iftikhar Hussain Arif was born on 21 March 1944. He enrolled at the University of Lucknow, where he studied English, Urdu and Sanskrit and got his MA degree in 1965, then studied journalism at New York University. In the same year, Arif then migrated to Karachi, Pakistan, where he worked as a newscaster for Radio Pakistan. He later joined the Pakistan Television Corporation (Karachi Center) where he teamed up with Obaidullah Baig for the PTV program Kasauti.

He spent the next thirteen years in England, until 1990, working for the BCCI and the Urdu Markaz in London.

== Achievements ==
Arif has published three poetry collections: Mehr-i-Doneem (1984), Harf-i-Baryab (1994) and Jahan-e-Maloom.

Oxford University Press has published an anthology of his translated poetry, Written in the Season of Fear, with an introduction by Harris Khalique, a poet who writes in English, Urdu and Punjabi.

== Awards ==
- Nishan-i-Imtiaz (Order of Excellence) Award by the President of Pakistan (2023)
- Hilal-i-Imtiaz (Crescent of Excellence) Award by the President of Pakistan (2005)
- Sitara-e-Imtiaz (Star of Excellence) Award by the President of Pakistan (1999)
- Pride of Performance (literature) by the President of Pakistan (1990)
- Faiz International Award for Poetry from the Aalami Urdu Conference

== Bibliography ==
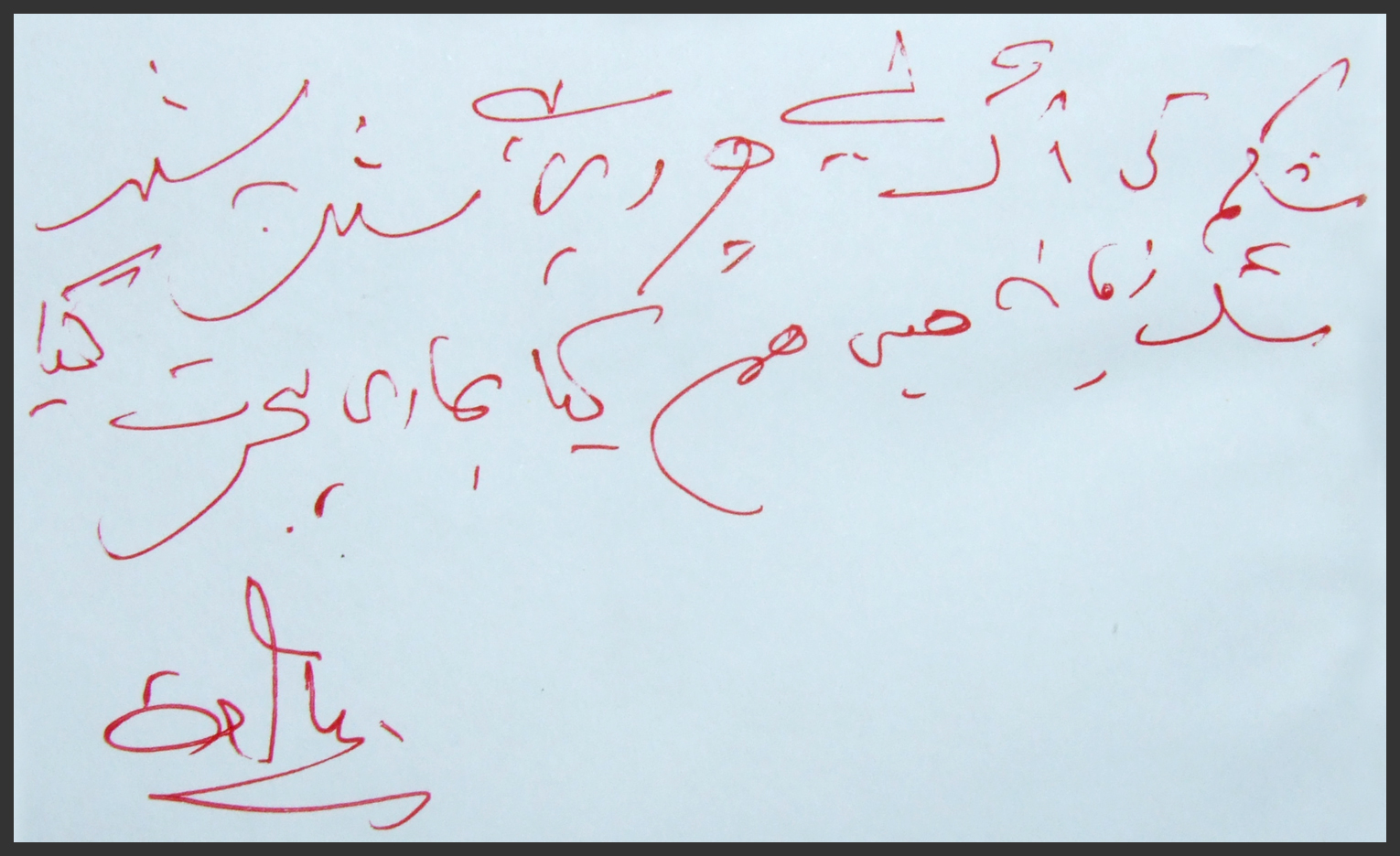
- A couplet by Iftikhar Arif
  Mehr-i-Doneem (1984)
- Harf-i-Baryab (1994)
- Jahan-e-Maloom (2005)
- Shehr-e-Ilm ke derwazay per (2006)
- Written in the Season of Fear (English translation)
- The Twelfth Man (translation of Barhwan Khilari by Brenda Walker, 1989)
- Kitab-e-Dil-o-Dunya (2009)
- Modern Poetry of Pakistan (2011)
