= Ghulam-us-Saqlain Naqvi =

Ghulam-Us-Saqlain Naqvi (Punjabi, Urdu: غلام الثقلین نقوی), (March 12, 1922 - April 6, 2002) was a Pakistani Urdu novelist and travel writer. was a Pakistani Urdu writer, best known for his short stories. His work often portrayed rural life.

== Early life ==
He belonged to a Syed family in Chowki Handan, Nowshera in Rajouri district, Jammu. He was born to Syed Amir Ali Shah, who was a teacher. He had 6 more siblings that included 2 sisters and 4 brothers. He married at a young age and completed his study after his marriage. He had 4 sons and 1 daughter. His best friend and critic during his writing period was his younger brother Sajjad Hussain Naqvi, who was also a writer and critic.

== Education ==
He wrote his first short story "Afsana" at the age of 10. He did his Intermediate from Murray College, Sialkot. He did his master's degree in Urdu literature from Punjab University. He retired as assistant professor from Government College University, Lahore (Then Govt College Lahore) in 1983.

== Works ==
His novel Mera Gaun (میرا گاؤں) was translated into Chinese. He started writing Urdu short essays at the age of 10. He also wrote many articles and columns in DAILY NAWA E WAQT. His work has also been dramatized on PTV.

His books on short stories(افسانہ) include:

- Band Gali
- Shafaq k Saaye
- Naghma Aur Aag
- Lamhe Ki Deewar
- Dhoop Ka Saaya
- Sargoshi
- Nuqte Sy Nuqte Tak

His novels include:

- Mera Gaon (My Village)

His travel literature (Safar Nama) include:

- Arz e Tammanah
- Chal Baba Aglay Shehar
- Terminus sy Terminus Tak
- He also wrote humour literature which was published as IK TURFA TAMASHA HAI

== Death ==
He died in 2002 in Lahore and was buried at his hometown Bharath.
