= Khurshid Rizvi =

Pakistani poet and scholar (born 1942)

Professor Dr. Khurshid Rizvi (Urdu: ڈاکٹر خورشید رضوی ; born 19 May 1942) is a Pakistani scholar, linguist, poet, and academic known for his contributions to Arabic, Persian, and Urdu literature. He is regarded as an authority on classical Arabic literature and manuscript editing. He was awarded the Sitara-i-Imtiaz in 2008 by the Government of Pakistan.

== Early life & Education ==
Rizvi was born on 19 May 1942 in Amroha, India. Following the partition of India, his family migrated to Montgomery (now Sahiwal), Pakistan in 1948. He completed his early education in Sahiwal and graduated with distinction in Arabic from Government College Montgomery in 1959. He later obtained an MA in Arabic from the University of the Punjab in 1961, securing first position, and completed his PhD in Arabic in 1981.

== Career ==
Rizvi began teaching at age 19 as a lecturer in Arabic at Government College in Bahawalpur before being posted to Government College in Sargodha. In 1984, he became the principal of Government Ambala Muslim College Sargodha. In 1985, he was seconded to (temporarily assigned to work at) the Islamic Research Institute, International Islamic University, Islamabad, where he served as Chief Bureau of Translation for six years. In 1991, he became Head of the Department of Arabic at Government College Lahore (now a university), retiring early in 1995 to focus on his research.

== Literary Work & Publications ==
Dr. Khurshid Rizvi has authored and edited books in many languages on a range of subjects including seven poetry collections to date. He has also done substantial translation work which includes his translation of Federal Shariat Court Judgement on Bank Interest (Riba) for Islamic Development Bank, Jeddah, Saudi Arabia. Dr. Khurshid Rizvi’s most celebrated research work so far has been his book entitled: Arabi Adab Qabl az Islam عربی ادب قبل از اسلام (Pre-Islamic Arabic Literature) . This is the first detailed critical review of pre-Islamic literature in Urdu language.

His publications include:

1. Shakh-e-Tanha (poetry) شاخ تنہا

2. Sarabon ke Sadaf (poetry) سرابوں کے صدف

3. Rayegan (poetry) رایگاں

4. Imkan (poetry) امکان

5. Yakja (poetry) یکجا

6. Deryaab (poetry) دیریاب

7. Nisbatain (poetry) نسبتیں

8. Pas Nawisht (پس نوشت )

9. Taleef (essays) تالیف

10. Atraaf (essays) اطراف

11. Tareekh-e-uloom mein Tehzeeb-e-Islaami ka Muqam (Urdu translation from Arabic) تاریخ علوم میں تہذیب اسلامی کامقام

12. Hukm al-Mahkamat-al-Shar’iyyah…… (translation from English into Arabic of the judgment of the Federal Shari’at Court of Pakistan on bank interest) "حكم المحكمة الشرعية الاتحادية الباكستانية بشأن الفائدة (الربا)"

13. Qala’id al-Juman (critical editing of a 13th century Arabic manuscript) "قلائد الجمان في فرائد شعراء هذا الزمان"

14. Arabi Adab Qabl az Islam- Part I (a detailed history of pre-Islamic Arabic literature) عربی ادب قبل از اسلام - حصہ اول

15. The Story of Muhammad: The Prophet of Islam (An English-language biography originally written for teenagers/ young adults, detailing the life, lineage, and prophethood of Muhammad PBUH through an engaging, story-driven narrative)

== Awards and recognition ==
· Sitara-i-Imtiaz (2008)

· Ahmad Nadeem Qasimi Award (2005)

· Ahmad Faraz Literary Award (2012)

· Khalid Ahmad Award (2013)

· UBL Literary Excellence Award (2013)

· Majlis-e-Farogh-e-Urdu Adab Award (2015)

· Life Time Achievement Award by Alami Urdu Conference (2025)

== Affiliations ==
Rizvi has been a member of the Arabic Language Academy (Majma‘ al-Lughah al-‘Arabiyyah), Cairo, Egypt, an honour previously held by only a few Pakistani scholars.

== Legacy ==
Professor Khurshid Rizvi is regarded as one of the leading figures in Arabic literary studies and Urdu poetry in Pakistan. His academic and literary contributions have played a significant role in introducing classical Arabic literature to Urdu-speaking audiences and strengthening scholarly links between South Asian and Arab intellectual traditions.
