= Halqa-e Arbab-e Zauq =

- Formation: 29 April 1939
- Founder: Qayyum Nazar
- Founded at: Lahore, British Punjab, India
- Type: Literary movement
- Headquarters: Lahore, Punjab
- Location: Pakistan, India, Europe, North America
- Members: 371
- Official language: Urdu

Halqa-e Arbab-e Zauq (Urdu: حلقہ ارباب ذوق, lit. 'Circle of the Men of Good Taste') is a Pakistani literary movement begun in Lahore, British Punjab, India on 29 April 1939.

Early members included Urdu language poets Noon Meem Rashid, Qayyum Nazar, and Meeraji, the latter of whom was invited by Nazar. The Halqa is the second modern literary movement in Urdu poetry in the 20th century, founded just a couple of years after the leftist Progressive Writers' Movement and is considered to be the most influential group in modern Urdu poetry.

Its first meeting was held under the name bazm-e dāstāngo (Storytellers' gathering) and organized by writers looking for a non-political meeting, and the name was changed to 'Halqa-e Arbab-e Zauq' soon after. Unlike the Progressives, the Halqa was not politically driven, but reflected a traditional Western mode of modernist literature with new styles of prose and new subject areas outside of classical Urdu poetry, with some experimenting with themes relating to the personal experiences of the subjects of the British rule in India. Noon Meem Rashid, for example, while not politically engaged, was influenced by Western modernist poets T. S. Eliot and Ezra Pound in exploring new verse forms. Meeraji, who introduced free verse and is considered to be the founder of symbolism in Urdu poetry, was also a prominent member of Halqa-e Arbab-e Zauq in its early days. Under his guidance, the Halqa moved from poetry reading events to become a group which also made active critiques on members' poetry.

Although strongly influential on modernist Urdu poetry, the group included and welcomed members whose prose and poetry was more traditional, including writers of the ghazal. As time went by, left-wing progressives were also welcome as members both in India and Pakistan. These members included short story writer, Krishan Chander, playwright Rajinder Singh Bedi, and avowed Marxist and leading Urdu poet, Faiz Ahmad Faiz.

Halqa continues to have regular sessions in various cities of Pakistan, most notably in Lahore, Islamabad, Faisalabad, and Karachi. While the organization was originally based in Lahore, Punjab in 1936, the Halqa (Circle) has branches wherever the Urdu language enthusiasts live—including India, Pakistan, Europe, and in North America.
