= Noon Meem Rashid =

Pakistani poet (1910–1975)

- نذر محمد راشد
- Born: Nazar Muhammad; August 1, 1910; Alipur Chatha, Punjab, British India
- Died: October 9, 1975 (aged 65); London, England
- Education: Government College Lahore
- Occupation: Urdu poet
- Writing career
- Notable works: Mavra; La Musawi Insaan; Iran Mian Ajnabi; Gumaan Ka Mumkin
- Literary movement: Progressive Writers' Movement

Nazar Muhammad Rashid (Urdu: نذر محمد راشد), (1 August 1910 – 9 October 1975) commonly known as Noon Meem Rashed (Urdu: ن ۔ م ۔ راشد) or N.M. Rashed, was a Pakistani poet of modern Urdu poetry.

== Early life and education ==
Rashid was born Nazar Muhammad into a Punjabi family of the Rajput in the village of Kot Bhaaga, Alipur Chatha, Wazirabad, Gujranwala District, Punjab. His father Fazal Ilahi Chishti was an Islamic scholar fond of Urdu poetry, especially Ghalib.

He earned a Master's degree in Economics from the Government College Lahore. He also studied English literature.

== Writing career ==
Rashed his first poem Jurrat-e-Parwaz (The Courage to Fly) in 1932 as a college student while he published his first collection of poetry in a book-form, Maavra (Beyond), in 1940.

He is considered to be the 'father of Modernism' in Urdu Literature. Along with Faiz Ahmed Faiz, he is one of the great progressive poets in Pakistani literature.

His readership is limited and recent social changes have further hurt his stature and there seems to be a concerted effort not to promote his poetry. His first book of free verse, Mavra, was published in 1940 and established him as a pioneering figure in 'free form' Urdu poetry.

== Other work ==
=== Military service ===
He served for a short time in the Royal Indian Army during the Second World War, attaining the rank of captain.

=== Politics ===
For some time he was associated with Inayatullah Khan Mashriqi.

=== Radio work ===
Before independence of Pakistan in 1947, he worked with All India Radio in New Delhi and Lucknow starting in 1942. He was transferred to Peshawar in 1947 where he worked until 1953. Later he was hired by Voice of America and had to move to New York City for this job. Then, for a short while, he lived in Iran.

=== Diplomacy ===
Later on, he worked for the United Nations in New York.

Rashed served the UN and worked in many countries.

== Last years and death ==
He retired to England in 1973 and died in a London hospital in 1975.

== Reception and legacy ==
Faiz Ahmad Faiz called him Malik-ush-Shoara (the king of poets).

=== Bollywood ===
His poem "Zindagi sey dartey ho" was set to music in the 2010 Bollywood movie, Peepli Live. It was performed by the Indian music band, Indian Ocean, and received critical appreciation as "hard-hitting" and "a gem of a track" that "everyone is meant to sing, and mean, at some point in life".

=== College hall ===
At Government College Lahore a hall is named after him as "Noon Meem Rashid Hall" at Postgraduate Block Basement.

== Books ==
- Mavraa (Beyond) 1940
- Iran Main Ajnabi (A stranger in Iran)
- La Musawi Insaan (Nothingness = Man) 1969
- Gumaan ka Mumkin (Speculations) published posthumously in 1976
- Maqalat (Essays)- Ed. Shima Majeed, 2002.
