= Pride of Performance =

Highest literary award of Pakistan

- تمغہِ حسنِ کارکردگی
- Type: Literary award
- Awarded for: Notable achievements in the field of art, science, literature, sports, and nursing.
- Country: Pakistan
- Presented by: Government of Pakistan
- Established: 19 March 1957; 69 years ago
- First award: 1958: Abdur Rahman Chughtai; Zainul Abedin; Abdus Salam
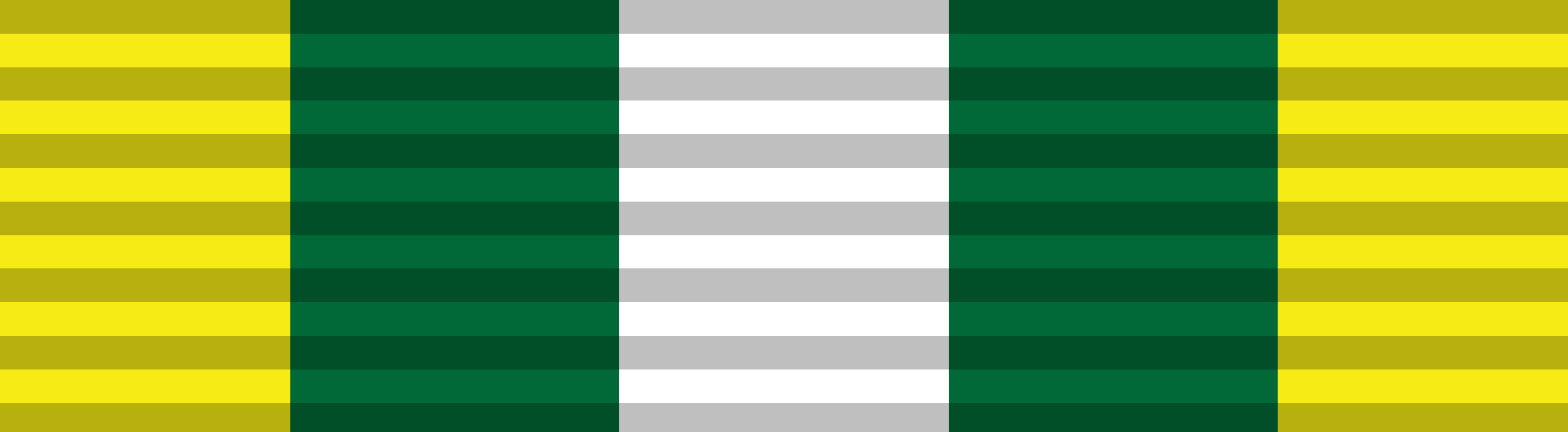
- Service ribbon of the Pride of Performance

Precedence
- Next (higher): None (Note: the Pride of Performance is the only literary award conferred by the government of Pakistan. It is not mentioned in the hierarchy of civilian awards. Please see reference or official website of the cabinet)
- Equivalent: none
- Next (lower): none

The Pride of Performance (Urdu: تمغہِ حسنِ کارکردگی, romanized: tamġā-e husn-e kārkardgī), officially known as the Presidential Pride of Performance, is an award bestowed by the Islamic Republic of Pakistan to recognize people with "notable achievements in the field of art, science, literature, sports, and nursing". It is considered one of the country's most prestigious awards in these fields conferred upon citizens and, in some cases, foreign nationals.

== History ==
The Pride of Performance award, including civil decorations was established in 1957 under the Decorations Act, 1975, enacted or modified in 1975. The award seeks to recognize notable achievements which are determined by the Pakistan Warrant of Precedence of 1980.

The award which was possibly first awarded in 1958, can also be conferred posthumously under a constitutional amendment, Article 259, clause two. It was delayed twice in the history of Pakistan. The fourth president Zulfikar Ali Bhutto was the first head of state who did not confer or announce the award, and later in 2018, due to the disqualification of Nawaz Sharif, the award was subsequently delayed.

== Nomination ==
The Presidential Pride of Performance is usually awarded by the president once a year at the Pakistan resolution day, but announcements are made at independence day ceremony held on 14 August. The award recommendations are made by the country's administrative units or respective ministry to the state governments where officials forward it to the Cabinet Secretariat and then president or federal government for final approval.

== List of recipients ==
- Pride of Performance Awards (1957–1971)
- Pride of Performance Awards (1972–1999)
- Pride of Performance Awards (2000–2009)
- Pride of Performance Awards (2010–2019)
- Pride of Performance Awards (2020–2029)
