= List of Pakistani poets =

This is a list of noted Pakistani poets, poets born or raised in Pakistan, whether living there or overseas, and writing in one of the languages of Pakistan.

== A ==
- Abbas Rizvi
- Abdul Latif Bhitai
- Adal Soomro
- Adeem Hashmi
- Agha Shorish Kashmiri
- Abid Ali Abid
- Aftab Iqbal Shamim
- Ahfaz ur Rahman
- Ahmad Faraz
- Ahmad Mallah
- Ahmad Nadeem Qasmi
- Ahmad Ali
- Ajmal Khattak
- Akhtar Raza Saleemi
- Alamgir Hashmi
- Ali Akbar Natiq
- Ali Baba Taj
- Ali Gul Sangi
- Ali Moeen
- Ameer Hamza Shinwari
- Amin Faheem
- Amjad Islam Amjad
- Anis Nagi
- Anwar Masood
- Ashfaq Hussain
- Aslam Farrukhi
- Ata Turab
- Ahmad Rahi
- Agha Hashar Kashmiri

== B ==
- Baqi Siddiqui
- Bushra Farrukh

== D ==
- Daud Kamal
- Dilawar Figar

== E ==
- Ehsan Danish

== F ==
- Faiz Ahmad Faiz
- Fayyaz Hashmi

== G ==
- Ghani Khan
- Ghulam Muhammad Qasir
- Mir Gul Khan Naseer

== H ==
- Habib Jalib
- Hafeez Jullundhri
- Hafiz Mazhar ud din
- Haji Laq laq
- Hakim Ahmad Shuja
- Hakim Nasir
- Harris Khalique
- Haider Qureshi
- Hammad Niazi

== I ==
- Ibn-e-Insha
- Idris Azad
- Iftikhar Arif

== J ==
- Jon Elia
- Jamiluddin Aali
- Janbaz Mirza
- Josh Malihabadi
- Jazib Qureshi
- Jamal Ehsani

== K ==
- Khaqan Haider Ghazi
- Khawar Rizvi
- Khurshid Rizvi
- Khushal Khan Khattak
- Khwaja Ghulam Farid
- Kishwar Naheed
- Khalid Irfan
- Khawaja Pervez

== L ==
- Liaquat Ali Asim
- Lala Sehrai

== M ==
- Mahmood Shaam
- Mir Abdul Rasool Mir
- Mohsin Naqvi
- Mohsin Changezi
- Majeed Amjad
- Muhammad Fazal Azim Taha
- Muhammad Izhar ul Haq
- Munir Niazi
- Mustafa Zaidi
- Muzaffar Warsi
- Moeen Faruqi
- Moeen Nizami

== N ==
- Naeem Hashmi
- Najeeba Arif
- Nasim Amrohi
- Nasir Kazmi
- Nazim Panipati
- Noon Meem Rashid

== O ==
- Obaidullah Aleem

== P ==
- Professor Iqbal Azeem
- Parveen Shakir
- Pirzada Qasim
- Patras Bokhari

== Q ==
- Qateel Shifai

== R ==
- Rahman Baba
- Rais Amrohvi
- Raees Warsi
- Raushan Yazdani

== S ==
- Sahar Ansari
- Saeed Ahmad Akhtar
- Bina Shah
- Shabnam Romani
- Shaikh Ayaz
- Shakeb Jalali
- Shahid Zaman
- Sufi Ghulam Mustafa Tabassum
- Saleem Kausar
- Samina Raja
- Saleem Tahir
- Ustad Sibte Jaffar Zaidi
- Sabir Zafar
- Shakir Shuja Abadi
- Shehzad Ahmed
- Salma Shaheen

== T ==
- Tabish Dehlvi
- Tahir Hanfi
- Tehzeeb Hafi

== U ==
- Ustad Bukhari

== W ==
- Wasif Ali Wasif
- Wazir Agha

== Y ==
- Yasmeen Hameed

== Z ==
- Zaheen Shah Taji
- Zamir Jafri
- Zehra Nigah

== See also ==
- List of Pakistani writers
- List of Urdu-language poets
