= Turab =

Turab may refer to:

== People ==
- Turab Ali (1943–2009), Pakistani footballer
- Turab Ali (cricketer) (1920–2009), Indian cricketer
- Turab Tula (1918–1990), Soviet Uzbek writer
- Ata Turab (born 1977), Pakistani poet
- Shah Turab-ul-Haq (1944–2016), Sunni Muslim scholar
- Abu Turab al-Urduni, Jordanian al-Qaeda member
- Abu Turab al-Zahiri (1923–2002), Indian-born Saudi Arabian linguist
- Matiullah Turab (1971–2025), Afghan poet
- Mir Turab Ali Khan, Salar Jung I (1829–1883), Indian nobleman
- Mirza Abu Turab Akhundzade (1817–1910), Azerbaijani theologian

== Other uses ==
- Abu Turab, title
- Mir Abu Turab's Tomb, tomb in India
