= Jazib Qureshi =

Pakistani poet

Jazib Qureshi جاذب قریشی
- Born: 3 August 1940 (age 85); Lucknow, British India
- Occupation: Poet,

Jazib Qureshi (Urdu: جاذب قریشی) (born 3 August 1940) is an Urdu poet, writer and critic from Pakistan. He has written many poetry books and works of literary critique.

== Biography ==
=== Background ===
Qureshi was born on 3 August 1940 in Luchnow, British India, where he spent his childhood. When he was six, his father died. As a result, he could not study further and worked hard for his living. He migrated with his family to Lahore, Pakistan, in 1950. He gained work in the press. He recommenced his studies and began writing poetry, attending literary gatherings and reading his poetry at Mushairas (poetic symposiums). His first literary gathering was in the Shahi Qila, chaired by the poet Ehsan Danish.

Qureshi was helped to write poetry by Shakir Dehlavi, who belonged to Dagh Dehlavi school of thought. Qureshi moved to Karachi in 1962, he worked in different magazines and newspapers. He qualified for master's degree from University of Karachi. Later he became a teacher in a college. He also made a feature film, "Pathar Kay Sanam", but it failed to gain a public response and experienced a financial loss.

== Literary career ==
Qureshi has written many books. His first work of literary criticism was published in 1982, and he also published poetry and prose books. He is a poet at the literary gatherings. As a poet and writer he has visited 35 cities across the United States, and he has also visited Bahrain, Qatar, Dubai, Sharjah and Abu Dhabi several times.

== Bibliography ==
- Takhleeqi Awaz تخلیقی آواز
- Ankh aur Charagh آنکھ اور چراغ
- Shairee aur Tehzeeb شاعری اور تہذیب
- Doosray Kinaray Tuk دوسرے کنارے تک
- Meri TehreeraiN میری تحریریں
- Mein nay Yeh Jana میں نے یہ جانا
- Pehchan پہچان
- Neend ka Reshum نیند کا ریشم
- Sheeshay ka Darakht شیشے کا درخت
- Ashoab e JaN آشوب جاں
- Ujlee AwazaiN اجلی آوازیں
- Shakasta Uks شکستہ عکس
- Shanasaii شناسائی
- Jhernay جھرنے
- AqeedataiN عقیدتیں
- Mujhay Yad Haiمجھے یاد ہے
- Naat kay Jadeed Rung نعت کے جدید رنگ
- Meri Shairee Meri Musavari میری شاعری، میری مصوری

== Death ==
He died on 21 June 2021 in Karachi and buried in Azizabad graveyard.

== See also ==
- List of Pakistani poets
- List of Urdu language poets
- List of Pakistani writers
