= Muhammad Fazal Azim Taha =

Hafiz Muhammad Fazal Azim Taha حافظ محمد فضل العظیم طہ

Youth Poet

Personal details
- Born: 7 February 1962 Rawalpindi, Pakistan
- Writing career
- Occupation: Poet, writer, analyst, lyricist and columnist
- Genres: Ghazal and Nazam
- Notable works: Tarana e Shabab, Watan Ka Difaa; Mithai ka dibba

Hafiz Muhammad Fazal Azim Taha (Urdu:حافظ محمد فضل العظیم طہ) is a Pakistani poet, writer, columnist, analyst, physician and lyricist born on 7 February 1962 in Rawalpindi, Pakistan. He started writing poetry in the early 21st century. He wrote many poems (Ghazal and Nazam) for children, youth, peace, romance, religious and for the defense of the nation. His work for youth has given him popularity and appreciation. In response to his work for youth he was given the position of Poet for Youth.He has adopted the nickname Taha as his pen name. He is the son of Hakeem Muhammad Yahya Khan Shifa who is the master of renowned poet Qateel Shifai. Taha also wrote for peace between Pakistan and India. Aman Ki Asha is the project of India and Pakistan for the peace of the subcontinent. He also Participated in Aman Ki Asha for peace between Pakistan and India. This project was started by Jang Media Group (Pakistan) and The Times of India (India).

== Bibliography ==
- Tarana e Shabab
- Ilm ki dolat
- Aman ki Asha
- Eid milo galay lagao

== See also ==
- List of Pakistani poets
- List of Pakistani writers
- List of Urdu language poets
- List of Urdu language writers
