= Haider Qureshi =

Pakistani urdu poet

Haider Qureshi حیدر قر یشی
- Born: 1 September 1953 (age 73); Rabwah, Chiniot District, Pakistan
- Occupations: Poet, Writer and journalist
- Known for: Work in Urdu mahiya

Haider Qureshi (Urdu: حیدر قر یشی), Qureshi Ghulam Haider Arshad (Urdu: قر یشی غلا م حیدر ارشد) born on 1 September 1953 in Rabwah, Punjab, is a Pakistani Urdu poet, short story writer, essayist, critic, editor and journalist. He writes in Urdu.

== Personal life ==
Haider Qureshi was born in Rabwah, Chiniot District, Punjab, Pakistan. He belongs to a Siraiki-speaking family. His father Qureshi Ghulam Sarwar was from Khanpur, Rahim Yar Khan. Haider Qureshi began writing verses at the age of 18. After passing his secondary level in 1968, he started working at a sugar mill. In the same year, he wrote his first romantic story. He wrote his first ghazal in 1971 soon after his marriage. He obtained his Master of Arts (M.A.) in Urdu literature in 1974. Qureshi moved to Germany in 1994, and continues to live there, now a German national.

== Literary career ==
Qureshi was an active member of literary circles in Khanpur. His six publications are related to anthologies of ghazal, nazm and mahiya. He had also penned short stories, sketches, memories, inshaiya (light essays), a travelog of his pilgrimage to Mecca and a literary collection of his 11 Books Umre-La ' haasil ka Haasil (The outcome of futile life). He is also a strong supporter of Urdu mahiya and has been both praised and criticised for his work on mahiya in the poetry circles.

He is the editor of the literary Urdu magazine Jadeed Adab, first launched from Khanpur in 1978, and later from Germany. Qureshi's poetry has been translated into English, Arabic, German and Turkish.

Most of his literary work is comprised in the book Umr-e-Lahaasil Ka Haasil, a Kulliyat of both poetry and prose.

== Jadeed Adab ==
Jadeed Adab (Urdu: جدید ادب) was an Urdu literary magazine based in Germany founded by Haider Qureshi; he remains its editor-in-chief. It is published from Germany, Pakistan and India, in print form and on the internet. It was first launched in 1978 from Khanpur, Pakistan. Farhat Nawaz was the co-editor of Jadeed Adab Khanpur in Pakistan.

Jadeed Adab was founded in 1978 from Khanpur, Pakistan, by Haider Qureshi at the cost of his spouse Mubarika Haider's jewelry which he sold one after another until all were sold and the magazine ceased to be published. It is published from Germany, Pakistan and India, and it is available both in print form and on the internet. After several years the magazine was restarted from Germany.

Jadeed Adab was (until the last 2012 issue) the only regularly published Urdu literary magazine both in print form and on the internet.

=== Views ===
Dawn newspaper praised his poetry remarking;

"Haider's poetry is a rich blend of traditional Urdu and the local lingo. In it one can find numerous examples of 'linguistic liberty. He is perhaps the only living poet who deliberately uses an old Punjabi dialect in Urdu ghazal..... The use of simple words, avoidance of complexity and creating a unique environment are praiseworthy. Be it ghazal, nazm or mahiya, the locale is visible in most of his poetry.

== Bibliography ==
Poetry

- Sulagtay Khawab (Smoldering Dreams) Tajdeed Ishaat Ghar Lahore, Islamabad, Pakistan. 1991
- Umre GurezaN (Reluctant Life) Tajdeed Ishaat Ghar Lahore, Islamabad, Pakistan. 1994
- Mohabbat kay Phool (Flowers of Love) Nayab Publications Lahore. 1996
- Duaaey Dil (prayer from the Heart) Nusrat Publishers Lahore 1997
- GhazlaiN, Nazmain, Mahiay Sarwar Adabi Academy Germany 1998
- Qafas Kay Andar (Inside The Cage) Akkas International Islamabad, 2013
- Dard Sumandar (Limitless pain) 2014
- Zindgi (Life) 2014

Prose

- Roshani ki Basharat(The Prophecy of Light.) – Tajdeed Ishaat Ghar Lahore, Islamabad
- "Qissay Kahaniyan"(Anecdotes and Stories)
- Afsaane (Short Stories)– Mayaar Publications Delhi, India. 1999
- Atmi Jang (Nuclear War)– Mayaar Publications Delhi, India. 1996
- Main Intezaar kerta hoon (And I Wait)– Sahitia Bharat, Delhi, India. 1999
- Meri Mohabbatein(Tales of my Heart)– Mayaar Publications Delhi, India. 1996–1998
- Soo-e-Hejaaz*(Journey to Makkah & Madeena)– Mayaar Publications Delhi, India. 2000–2004
- Khatti Meethi Yaadein (sweet and sour Memories)
- Faaslay'Qurbaten (Aloofness and Intimacies)
- "Abba Ji aur Ammi Ji"(My Father and Mother)
- "Hayat e Mubarika Haider"(Biography of Mubarika Haider)
- Mubarika Mahal (Mubarika Palace)
- " Beemari ya Roohani Tajrabah" (Illness or Spiritual Experience)

Research and critics books

- Dr. Wazir Agha ahad saaz shakhshiyat –(Dr. Wazir Agha History Maker).1995
- Hasil e Mutalea (Study gains).
- Tassuraat (Impressions).
- Mazameen aur Tabsaray (Essays and Reviews).
- Dr. Gopichand Narang aur Ma baad Jadeediat (Dr. Gopichand Narang and postmoderism).
- Dr. Satyapal Anand ki Boodni, NaBoodni
- Hamara Adabi Manzar Namah (Our Literary Scenario).
- Mazameen o Mabahes (Essays and debates).
- Urdu mein Mahiya Nigari –(Mahiya poetry in Urdu) Farhad Publications Rawalpindi, Pakistan. 1999
- Urdu Mahiay ki Tehreek (Urdu Mahiya movement).
- Urdu Mahiye ke Baani Himmat Rai Sharma –(Founder of Urdu Mahia Himmat Rai Sharma).
- Mahiay ke Mabahes (Debates on Mahiya).
- Urdu Mahiya (Mahiya in Urdu).
- Urdu Mahiya Tehqeeq o Tanqeed (Urdu Mahiya:Research and Criticism).

University Research Thesis on the literary work of Haider Qureshi

- PHD Topic "Haider Qureshi Shakhsiat aur Adabi Jahten" (Haider Qureshi Personality & literary facets) year 2013,

Research Sholar Dr. Abdul Rab Ustaad, Gulbarga University Gulbarga, India.

- M.Phil. Topic "Haider Qureshi ki Adabi Khidmaat.(Literary contribution of Haider Qureshi) year 2014,

Researcher Aamir Sohail, Hazara University Mansehra, Pakistan.

- M. Phil Topic "Haider Qureshi Hayat o Khidmaat" (Haider Qureshi Life & contribution to literature) year 2013,

Researcher Anjum Aara, Calcutta University, Kolkata, India.

- M.Phil. Topic "Haider Qureshi bahesiat Mohaqqeq aur Naqqad"(Haider Qureshi as a Researcher and a Critic) year 2018,

Researcher Sughra Begum, Federal Urdu University, Islamabad, Pakistan.

- M.Phil. Topic "Haider Qureshi ki Shairi ka Mutalea"(A study of Haider Qureshi's poetry) year 2014,

Researcher Hriday Bhano Pratap, Jawahar Lal Nehru university Delhi, India.

- M.Phil. Topic "Haider Qureshi ki Afsana Nigari ka Mutalea"(A study of Haider Qureshi's short stories) year 2014,

Researcher Razeena Khan, Jawahar Lal Nehru university Delhi, India.

- M.A. Topic "Sherul mehjer inda Haider Qureshi... Ma-alTarjuma"Arabic,(Urdu poetry in other countries in the light of Haider Qureshi 's poetry ... this thesis is written in Arabic after translating 4 poetry books of Haider Qureshi) year 2015,

Researcher Ahmad Abdurba Abbas, Azhar University, Cairo, Egypt.

- M.A. Topic "Haider Qureshi Shakhsiat aur Fann"(Haider Qureshi Personality & literary work) year 2002,

Researcher Munazzah Yasmeen, Islamiah University Bahawal Pur, Pakistan.

- M.Phil. Topic "Majalla Jadeed Adab ki Adabi Khidmaat"(The contribution of"Jadid Adab" to literature) year 2018,

Researcher Kanwal Tabassum, Federal Urdu University, Islamabad.Pakistan.

- M.A. Topic "Jadeed Adab men shaey honay walay Mabahes",(Literary debates published in " Jadid Adab ") year 2009,

Researcher Shazia Humera, Islamia University Bahawal Pur, Pakistan.

- M.Phil. Topic "Risala Jadeed Adab ki Adabi Khidmaat.. Tehqeeqi o Tanqeedi Mutalea"

(A critical review to evaluate literary contribution of "Jadid Adab") year2018, Researcher Mohamad Shoaib, Hazara University Mansehra, Pakistan.

== See also ==
- List of Pakistani poets
- List of Urdu language poets
- List of Pakistani writers
- List of Urdu language writers
- List of Pakistani journalists
- List of magazines in Pakistan
