= Baqi Siddiqui =

Urdu poet (1908–1972)

- Born: Muhammad Afzal; 20 December 1905; Rawalpindi, Punjab, British India
- Died: 8 January 1972 (aged 66)
- Occupation: Poet
- Years active: 1928 – 1972

Baqi Siddiqui (20 December 1905 – 8 January 1972) is the pen name of a Punjabi, Pothohari, and Urdu poet from Pakistan. He is best known for his ghazal "Daagh e Dil Humko Yaad Anay Lagay".

== Early life and career ==
Baqi Siddiqui was born as Muhammad Afzal on 20 December 1905, in Saham village in Rawalpindi, Punjab, British India. His father was an employee of North Western State Railway. After his matriculation (10th grade of basic school education), Baqi briefly worked as a school teacher. In 1932, he moved to Bombay (now Mumbai) and worked as an actor and dialogue writer in the film industry. In 1940, he joined the British Army but soon resigned. After returning to his native town, he became associated with Radio Pakistan, Rawalpindi, for the next 18 years and penned many Pothohari songs for its broadcasts.

Baqi had started his poetic career in 1928 by reciting his poetry in social gatherings (Mushairas). He adopted "Baqi Siddiqui" as a pen name. In the beginning, he wrote poetry in Punjabi but later also in Urdu. He developed close friendships with Urdu poets like Mohsin Ehsaan, Shoukat Wasti, Ahmed Faraz, Raza Hamdani, Ehsan Danish, Abdul Hameed Adam, and others. His first collection of poetry, Jaam-e-Jam, was published in 1944. His last two books, Kitni Der Chiragh Jala and Zaad e Rah, were published posthumously in 1977 and 1984 respectively.

== Personal life ==
Baqi never married and spent most of his life living with and supporting his younger divorced sister Asghari Khanum.

== Books ==
- Jaam e Jam (1944) (a collection of poems and ghazals)
- Daar o Rasan (1951)
- Zakham e Bahar (1961) (a collection of ghazals)
- Kachay Ghharray (1967) (Pothohari poetry)
- Kitni Der Chiragh Jala (1977)
- Zaad e Rah (1984) (nasheeds)

== Death ==
Baqi died on 8 January 1972, at age 67, in Rawalpindi and was buried in his native town's graveyard.

== See also ==
- List of Pakistani poets
