= Umr-e-Lahaasil Ka Haasil =

- Author: Haider Qureshi
- Language: Urdu
- Genre: Poetry and prose
- Publisher: Education Publications House Delhi, India
- Publication place: Pakistan / Germany

Umr-e-Lahaasil Ka Haasil (Urdu: عمر لاحاصل کا حاصل) is a collection of a poetry and prose book. It is authored by Haider Qureshi, a Pakistani poet, writer and journalist. The book comprises four published poetry books, titled ' Sulaghtey Khwaab, Umr-e-Guraizan, Muhabbat Kei Phool, Dua-e-Dil and fifth unpublished poetry book, 'Dard Samunder. In prose, it comprises these books, 'Roshni Ki Basharat, Qissay Kahanian, Meri Muhabbatein, Soo-e-Hijaaz, Khati Meethi Yaadein and one collection on Inshiye 'Faasiley Qurbatein.

== Summary ==
Haider Qureshi's poetry is basically on the theme of love and affection but his some nazms are on diverse topics, including current global issues, history and mythologies. Qureshi has also written Mahiyas, a form of the Urdu poetry.

In prose, the second part of the book, Qureshi expresses his emotions, views and feelings. His work of prose and poetry is based on the universe, human being, God, soul and cultures. In his short stories, he speaks about the oil-driven wars imposed by western world and about the rich and the poor. He has also written an autobiography.

=== Expression ===
Qureshi has expressed and recalled, in many poems, articles and short stories, his memories of old days in Pakistan. He has also written his views about poets and writers like Faiz Ahmad Faiz, Dr Wazir Agha, Mirza Adeeb, Ghulam Jeelani Asghar and Azra Asghar.
