= List of Dhaka College faculty =

This list of Dhaka College faculty includes notable teachers, professors and principals of Dhaka College.

| Name | Notability | Notes |
|---|---|---|
| George Harry Langley | 2nd vice-chancellor of the University of Dhaka | |
| Walter Allen Jenkins | 7th vice-chancellor of the University of Dhaka | |
| Mohammad Noman | 5th vice-chancellor of Jahangirnagar University | |
| Jasim Uddin Ahmed | Nuclear physicist, language activist, poet and author | |
| Muzaffar Ahmed | Former Adviser of the Provisional Government of Bangladesh Founder and former President of Bangladesh National Awami Party (Pro-Moscow) | |
| SM Shafiul Azam | Served as Minister or Adviser of Ministries of Communication, Industries, Commerce, Textiles and Jute, Science and Technology, Planning, Energy and Mineral Resources 2nd Cabinet Secretary | |
| AKM Azizul Haque | Former Minister of Agriculture | |
| Ashraf Siddiqui | Former Director General of Bangla Academy | |
| M Harunur Rashid | Former Director General of Bangla Academy | |
| Prasanna Kumar Roy | First Indian Principal of Presidency College, Kolkata | |
| Bhupati Mohan Sen | Physicist and mathematician | |
| Ayub Ali | Islamic scholar, author and educationist | |
| Akhteruzzaman Elias | Novelist and short story writer | |
| Akhtar Imam | Educationist and social activist | |
| Iqbal Azeem | Urdu poet and scholar | |
| Nurul Haque Miah | Professor of chemistry | |
| Muhammad Mansuruddin | Author, literary critic, essayist, folklorist, lexicographer and biographer Recipient of Independence Award, Ekushey Padak and Bangla Academy Literary Award | |
| Abu Rushd | Storywriter, novelist, litterateur and educationist | |
| Mirza Fakhrul Islam Alamgir | General Secretary of Bangladesh Nationalist Party (BNP) | |
| Shawkat Osman | Novelist and short story writer | |
| Alauddin Al-Azad | Author, novelist, poet, literary critic and educationist | |
| Mohammad Rafiq | Poet Recipient of Ekushey Padak and Bangla Academy Literary Award | |
| Abdullah Abu Sayeed | Educationist | |
| Kazi Abdul Wadud | Essayist, critic and dramatist | |
| Abdur Rashid Khan | Writer, educator, essayist and poet | |
| Muhammad Abdul Bari | Vice Chancellor of Rajshahi University | |
| Momtazuddin Ahmed | Vice Chancellor of Rajshahi University | |
| Shah Abdul Hannan | Deputy Governor of Bangladesh Bank | |
