= Beena Sarwar =

Journalist and political activist from Pakistan

- Education: Brown University; Harvard University
- Occupations: Journalist, Peace Activist, Artist, Filmmaker
- Employer(s): Aman ki Asha, Southasia Peace Action Network, Sapan News Network, Emerson College
- Website: beenasarwar.com

Beena Sarwar is a Pakistani journalist, artist and filmmaker focusing on human rights, media and peace.

She resides in Boston and is currently the editor of the Aman ki Asha (Hope for Peace) initiative, that aims to develop peace between the countries of India and Pakistan.

The initiative is jointly sponsored by the Jang group in Pakistan and the Times of India across the border.

In March 2021, she founded the Southasia Peace Action Network or SAPAN along with other peace activists from across South Asia. In August 2022, SAPAN informally launched Sapan News Network, a news and features syndicated service in the making. She is its founding editor.

== Education and career ==
Prior to her current position, Beena has worked as an Assistant Editor at The Star, as Features editor at The Frontier Post, and was the founding editor of The News on Sunday in 1993. She has also produced television shows for Geo TV and served as Op-ed Editor for The News International. She holds a BA degree in Art and Literature from Brown University in 1986, an MA degree in TV documentary from Goldsmiths College, London in 2001. She also wrote a popular monthly column titled 'Personal Political' which was published by Hard News, in India.

In 1998, Sarwar created an informal email newsletter on personal and political issues. In 2002, Sarwar started a Yahoo! group, beena-issues. Sarwar has a personal blog, "Journeys to Democracy," which she started in 2009. She was named Teabreak.pk's Featured Blogger in March 2010. Her blog has also been named "Best Blog From a Journalist" at the Pakistan Blog Awards in 2011.

She was a Nieman Fellow at Harvard University in 2006, and a Fellow at the Carr Center for Human Rights Policy at the Harvard Kennedy School 2007. Before joining Emerson College as a faculty in 2017, she taught journalism at Princeton University, Brown University, and Harvard Summer School.

She contributes news and commentary to media outlets around the world including New York Times, Guardian, Boston Globe, Al Jazeera, BBC, CNN, VOA, and NPR. She has published essays in several nonfiction anthologies and is Editor of Aman ki Asha (hope for peace), a platform launched jointly by the two largest media groups of Pakistan and India respectively. She leads the South Asia Peace Action Network or SAPAN, a cross-border, inter-generational coalition launched in March 2021. In August 2022, SAPAN informally launched Sapan News Network, a news and features syndicated service in the making.

== Filmography ==
Sarwar was the director/producer in the following selected documentaries:

- Naheed: A Portrait, (2001) Dir./Prod, Goldsmiths College (University of London)
- Naheed’s Story, (2001) Dir./Prod, Goldsmiths College (University of London)
- Karachi Diary, (2001) Dir., VPRO (Dutch Television), Netherlands
- Forced Marriage, (2003) Dir., Geo TV Pakistan
- From Pakistan, with Love: Saneeya Hussain (1954-2005), (2005) Dir., Geo TV Pakistan, Women Broadcasting for Change series, London
- Mukhtiar Mai: The Struggle for Justice, (2006) Dir., Women Broadcasting for Change series, London (‘Best Documentary’, Jaipur International Film Festival, Feb. 2009)
- Milne Do: Let Kashmiris Meet, [2009], Dir., prod., Video Journalism Movement
- Aur Nikleinge Ushhaq ke Qafle - There Will Be More Caravans of Passion, Prod. Independent film, Dir. Sharjil Baloch, 2010

== Published chapters in edited anthologies ==
- India, Pakistan And ‘Southasia’ in Thirty Years of SAARC: Society, Culture and Development, IIC Quarterly, May 2015
- Editor of: “Exploring Women’s Voices – Women in Conflict Zones: The Pakistan Study – Community Conversations in Balochistan and Swat” – by Nazish Brohi and Saba Gul Khattak for The Women's Regional Network, 2014
- Milne Do (let them meet), in This Side That Side — Restorying Partition, graphic anthology, Yoda Press, New Delhi, 2013)
- Ch 36-Media- New Trends, Old Problems in South Asia 2060: Envisioning Regional Futures (Anthem Press, London, 2013)
- Introduction, Biography and Conclusion for The Political Economy of a Punjabi Village in Pakistan by Zekiye Eglar, commissioned by the Institute of Intercultural Studies, New York; Oxford University Press 2011
- Uphill and Downstream in Pakistan, chapter on environmental journalism in Pakistan for Green Pen, Sage, India, 2010
- Media matters, chapter in ‘The Great Divide: India and Pakistan’, edited by Ira Pande; India International Center quarterly, 2010
- The MF Husain controversy- Identity, intent and the rise of militant fascism, Nukta Art, Volume 4, Issue 2, Karachi, October 2009
- Role of Women in Building Peace between India and Pakistan, chapter in Women Building Peace Between India and Pakistan, edited by Shree Mulay & Jackie Kirk, An Anthem Critical Studies book, Anthem Press (London, New York, Delhi), 2007
- Karachi, in A City Under Siege: Carnage in Karachi, 12/15/07, Human Rights Commission of Pakistan, 2007
- Bombay, personally, in imagine: neighbors in peace, The Chowk Company, USA, 2005
- Media profile of Pakistan, UNDP Cross Boundary Media Initiatives Project (PARAGON Regional Governance), March 2002
- Rumors, in PeaceFire, Fragments from the Israel-Palestine Story, Ethan Casey & Paul Hilder, Free Association Books/Blueear.com, UK 2002
- Pakistani Women: An Overview and Women and Media in Pakistan: Reality unrepresented, facts distorted, in A National Study on Monitoring and Sensitisation of the Print Media on the Portrayal of Women: Changing Images, Uks, Islamabad, January 2002.
- WSF: moving ahead, in quarterly Inter-Asia Cultural Studies, Volume 5, Issue 2 (Routledge, Taylor & Francis, London) August 2004
- The Hijacking of Pakistan, in Dispatches from a Wounded World, BlueEar. & BookSurge, USA & UK, December 2001
- Women more Vulnerable, chapter (co-authored) on Pakistan in TB Do or Die published by The Panos Institute South Asia and World Health Organisation, Kathmandu, Nov 1998
- Transformation From Within: Women's Education in Pakistan, Overseas, Royal Over-Seas League quarterly journal, London, June 1998
- “We Are the Future”: a story of the Pakistani girl child (editor), Family Planning Association of Pakistan, launched at UN Women's Conference, Beijing August 1995.
- On Suspicion of Illicit Relations in Women and Violence: Realities and Responses Worldwide, edited by Miranda Davies, Zed Books Ltd., UK/USA, 1994
