= Abida Parveen discography =

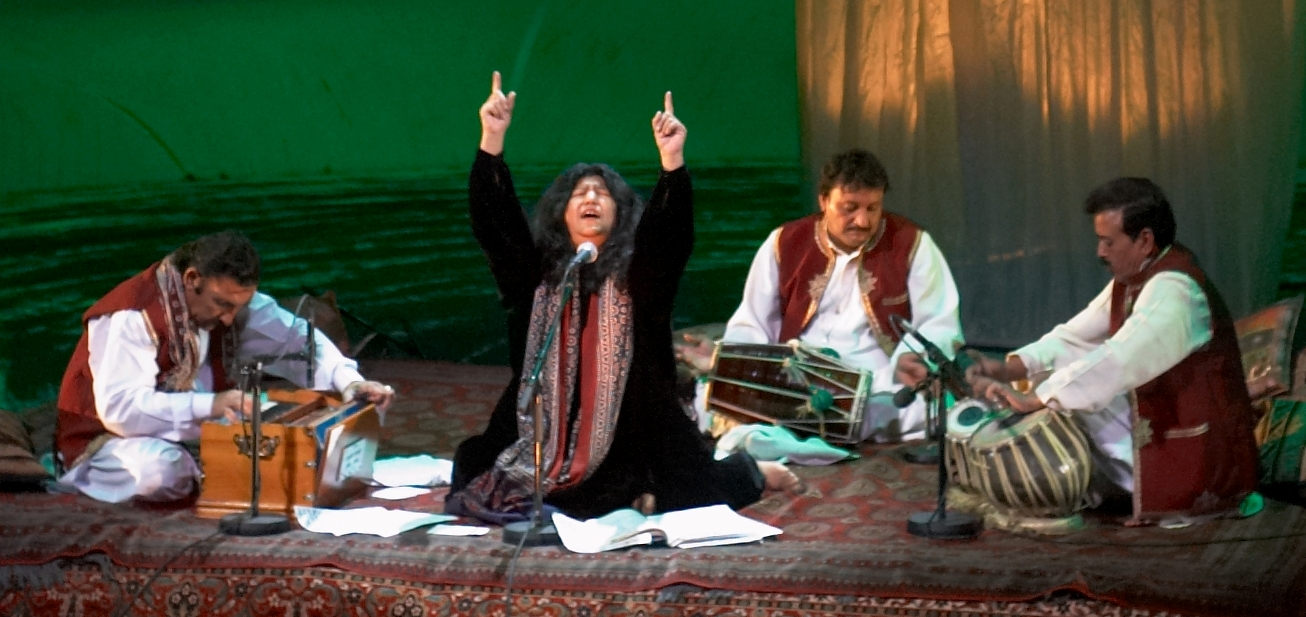
Parveen in 2007 in Oslo

Abida Parveen (born 1954) is a Pakistani singer who excels in Sufi music, folk singing and ghazal.

Starting her journey from Radio Pakistan in 1973, she later became a prominent figure in Sufi music. Abida Parveen has released numerous albums across Sufi, folk, and ghazal genres. She performs worldwide and prefers spreading the Sufi word by her vocals abroad.

Raqs-e-Bismil (2001) is among Parveen’s best-known albums. Her recordings have also appeared on compilation albums featuring works by multiple artists. Her most recent album is Shah jo Risalo on which she recorded all of Shah Abdul Latif Bhittai's kalam in an 11 volume CD. She is best known for the songs "Yaar ko Hamne Jabaja Dekha", written by Shah Niyaz from the album Raqs-e-Bismil; "Tere Ishq Nachaya", written by Bulleh Shah from the album Tere Ishq Nachaya; and "Jab se tune Mujhe" written by Nasir Kazmi from the album Ghazal ka Safar. "Tu Ne Diwana Banaya" written by Zaheen Shah Taji.

== Discography ==
This list is not exhaustive.

| Year | Album | Tracks |
|---|---|---|
| January 1 1981 | Ji Sindhi Mehfil | Aayo Ghayan Akh Ji; Ramzun San Ghulam; Suboh Sajhur Parhio; Mandh Painde Moun; Husson Asante Halan |
| March 1 1985 | TV Hits | Rang Baaten Karen; Ae Dil Nasheen; Aandhi Chali To; Haq Maula; Preetam Mat Pardes; Har Tarannum; Jadon Ishq Laga; Kiya Sar-O-Kaar; Ab Yeh Aankhen |
| January 3 1985 | An Evening With Abida Parveen (Vol. 1) | Shehr Sunsaan hy; Jab Se Tune Mujhe; Yeh Baatein Jhooti; Mera Ishq We Tun; Kithe Mehr-E-Ali; Yaar Tha Gulzar; Aandhi Chali To; Ek Maula Kanun Main |
| January 7 1985 | Latest Ghazals By Abida Parveen | Hum Ko Dar Dar; Humsafar; Kahin to Ishq Ki Awargi; Ku Baku Phail Gai; Mera Khamosh Reh Kar Bhi; Yaar Tha Gulzar Tha |
| October 23 1985 | Aashna (Vol. 1) | Ajab Nain Tere; Andar Hu Te; Jis Din Ke Saajan; Bulle Noon Samjha; Main Naraye; Meri Bukkal De Vich; Rabba Mere Haal Da; Yar Tha Gulzar Tha |
| October 23 1985 | Aashna (Vol. 2) | Gul huyi; Woh jo; Ake Sajda Nashin; Sare Shaam Usne; Aadmi Aadmi; Sham-e-Firaq; Tere gham ko |
| December 1 1986 | An Evening With Abida Parveen Vol. 2 | Gham-E-Zindagi Se Guzar Gaye; Tum Ko Dekhe Hue Zamane; Tere Gham Ko Jaan Ki Talaash; Kis Dasht Ko Ja Niklen; Hum Na Nikhat Hain Na Gul Hain; Koi Ajnabi Sa; Kal Chaudhwin Ki; Sade Vehrre Aaya |
| December 1 1986 | Latifi Laat | Yaar Sajan Jee Faraaq; Kaat Qareeban Jee; Danoora-E-Dayach; Mand Payendi Moon; Akyoun Megh Malaar; Royo Waini Ro; Munhanjo Mulk Malir |
| April 1 1987 | An Evening With Abida Parveen (Vol.3) | Milne Ki Tarah; Niyat-E-Shauq Bhar; Parchan Shala Panwara; Sair Hai Tujh Se Meri; Bana Gulab to Kante; Yeh Sooraten Elahi; Laila |
| March 1 1987 | An Evening With Abida Perveen (Vol.4) | Sakhi Lal Shahbaz Qalandar; Jab Teri Yaad; Bajoo Band Khul Khul Jaye; Hum to Hain Pardes Mein; Dila Kis Ki Lagan; Dil Soch Samajh Ke; Ke Ghunghroo Toot Gaye; Ho Jamalo |
| March 1 1987 | Kafian Bulleh Shah | Ishq Na Darda; Tenon Kal Na; Ek Nuqta Yaar; Asan Ishq Namaz; Dil Lag Gai Be; Sadhe Wehrre |
| January 10 1989 | Mehfil-E-Ghazal | Tujh Lab Ki Sifat; Soz-E-Gham de Ke Mujhe; Khabar-E-Tahayyar Ishq Sunn; Dhoondo Ge; Yeh Aarzoo Thi Tujhe; Yun Saja Chand Ke |
| March 1 1989 | Yaadgar Ghazlen (Vol.2) | Ham To hain Pardes |
| December 1 1989 | Yaadgar Ghazlen (Vol.5) | Mahi Yaar Di Ghadoli |
| 1989 | Sings Songs of the Mystics (Vol.1) | Aandhi Chali; Sade Verhe Aaya Kar; Koo-ba-koo Phail Gai; Ham ko Yaan Dar Dar Phiraaya; Jabse Tune Mujhe |
| 1989 | The Golden Collection | Aandi Chali; Dhondo Ge Agar; Jab Se Tune; Kal Chaudveen Ki; La Makaan Main; Rang Baatein; Sade Where; Tere Ishq; Yeh Baatein |
| January 1 1990 | Yaadgar Ghazlen (Vol.6) | Rang Batein Karen |
| March 1 1990 | Meri Pasand (Vol.2) | Sheher Sunsaan Hai; Ranjha Shah Hazari Da; Rang Batein Karey; Mandh Piya Day Mo Bahla; Kisi Ki Aankh Jo Purnam; Yaar Di Ghadoli Bhardi |
| September 1 1991 | Rang-E-Tasavof | Sada Bahar; Ujrean Toon Masjid |
| 1991 | Mahi Dil Wich | Wah Wah Guzran; Mahi Dil Vich; Jinda Ishq Laga; Ishq Sarha Kab; Uthe Nahin Toon; Dilari Luti; Daachi Walyia; Sade Wehre Aya |
| March 1 1992 | Kafian Khwaja Ghulam Farid | Mendha Ishq Wee Toon; Aawas Mandrrhe Kol; Bar Saudagar Lad Gaye Nee; Hai Ishq Da Jalwa Har; Tati Ro Ro Waat Nihara; Jhok Ladae Veen Yaar Deewana |
| April 1 1992 | Best of Abida Parveen | Gham-E-Zindagi Se Guzar; Kal Chaudhwin Ki Raat; Tumko Dekhe Huwe; Kis Dasht Ko Ja; Aandhi Chali To; Kya Sarokar Ab Kisi Se; Yeh Baten Jhooti; Koi Ajnabi Sa Dayar; Yaar Tha Gulzar Tha; Yeh Suraten Elahi |
| June 6, 1995 | Chants soufis du Pakistan | Man Kunto Maula; All my coquetry was stolen; Jab se tune; Ganj shakar's menboob nizam; Tere Ishq Nachaya; You are my love; Leave the discussion |
| 1997 | Devotional Journey | Man Kunto Maula; Jab Se Tune Muje Deewana; Ghungroo Tut Gaye; Mahi Yaar di; Raag Aman Kalyan; Shahbaaz Kalandar |
| 1998 | Aap Ki Abida | Aahat Si Koi Aaye To; Yeh Kaun Aati; O Des Se Aane; Ek Lazfe Mohabbat; Awwale Shab Woh; Sarv O Saman Bhi |
| March 09 1999 | Khazana | Takleef-E-Hijar De Gayi; Dard-E-Dil Bhi Ghame; Kuchh Is Ada Se Aaj; Ishq Ka Raaz Gar Na; Le Chala Jaan Meri; Aap Ki Yaad Aati Rahi; Tere Aane Ka Dhoka Sa; Sauda Ho To Aisa Ho; Aadmi Aadmi Se Milta Hai |
| January 1 2000 | Ho Jamalo | Ho Jamalo; Aaj Rang Hai; Kirpa Karo; Nazi Ni Kyo; Sang Har Shaqs; Aree Logo; Yaar Ko Hamne Jabaja Dekha |
| July 25 2000 | Songs of the Mystics (Vol.2) | Yaar di Gharoli; Woh Hamsafar Tha; Kithe Mehr Ali; Balle Balle; Tere Ishq Nachaaya; Baaju Band Khul Khul Jaae; Mast Qalandar; Ho Jamalo |
| January 1 2001 | Tere Ishq Nachaya | Tere Ishq Nachaya; Ali Maula; Menda Ishq; Ghungharva; Mast Qalandar |
| August 16 2001 | Raqs-e-Bismil | Yaar Ko Hamne; Roshan Jamal-e-Yaar; Jalwa Baqadra; Ji chahe to; Ishq Mein; Mujhe Bekhudi; Zahid Ne Mera |
| November 29 2001 | Jahan E Khusrau | Aaj rang hai; Chaap tilak; Mo se bolo na; Akbaroo; Man kunto maula; Tori sorat ke balihari; Moula Ali; Chashm e maste ajabe |
| 2001 | Tere Ishq Mein Daloon Dhammal | Tere Ishq Mein Daloon Dhamal; Daman Lagyan Molan; Mein Mangti Mola Ali; Mehndi Murshid Lal Di; Chalo Key Deep Jalaein; Har So Ali Ali Hai; Lal Da Sehra Mein Gawan; Aya Sehwan Neray Aya; Meri Hazri Qabool Karain; Saiyan Saiyan |
| 2001 | The Magic of Abida | Main Janu Mera Khuda Jane; Mujhko Bata Ae; Sanoon Ishq Laga Hai; Chalo Ri Saiyan; Hun Menoon Kaun; Hairan Hua Hairan; Meri Bukkal De Vich; Hind Sindh Da |
| January 1 2002 | The Best of Shah Hussain | A two volume CD featuring Nusrat Fateh Ali Khan, Wadali brothers and Hans Raj Hans |
| January 22, 2002 | Kabir | Mann Lago Yaar; Sounn To Sapne Milun; Saahib Mera Ek Hai; Bhala Hua Meri Matki |
| February 25, 2002 | Sings Amir Khusrau | Man Kunto Maula; Tori Surat Ke; Aaj Rang Hai; Moh Se Bolo Na; Chhaap Tilak Sab; Chashme Masti |
| April 22 2002 | Faiz | Gul Huyi Jaati Hain; Hamne Sab Sheher Mein; Woh Jiski Deed Mein; Yeh Jafaa-e-gham Ka Chara; Nahin Nigah Mein Manzil; Shaam-E-Firaq |
| July 9 2002 | Hazrat Sultanul Arafin Haq Bahu Rematullah | Ae Tann Mera; Andar Hu Te Baahar Hu; Ho Hi Maula |
| November 12, 2002 | Visal | Royo Wethi Roe; Mera Sohna Sajan Ghar Aya; Tati Ro Ro Wat Nihara; Ishq Na Derda Mot Kolon; Sajjan de Hath Banh Asadi; Are Logo Tumhara Kya |
| January 1 2003 | Janaan (Vol.1) | Janaan; Kya Khwab Tha; Mere Honthon Pe; Khushboo Ka Koi; Kya kya hoi aankhon; Mere honton pe; Saiyaan; Tera faqir hoon maula; Zara si baat |
| January 1, 2003 | The Best Of Abida Parveen (Vol.1) | Tere Ishq Nachya; Ali Maula; Menda Ishq; Ghungharva; Mast Qalandar |
| January 1, 2003 | The Best Of Abida Parveen (Vol.2) | Ho Jamalo; Aaj Rang Hai; Kirpa Karo; Nazi Ni Kyo; Sang Har Shaqs; Arey Logo; Yaar Ko Hamne |
| May 6, 2003 | Baba Bulleh Shah | Wah Wah Ramz Sajjan Di; Meri Bukkal De Vich Chorni; Jo Rang Rangey; Ghoonghat Ohle Na Luk Sajna; Ab Lagan Lagi; Bulle Noon Samjhavan |
| June 17 2003 | Mere Dil Se | Ajab Nain Tere; Hairan Hua Hairan Hua; Hum Ko Pasand Yaar Ki; Jis Din Ke Saajan; Main Naraye Mastana; Preetam Mat Pardes; Tu Ne Diwana Banaya |
| 2003 | Sufi Queen | Bhala hua meri matki; Saahib Mera ek hai; Mann lago yaar; Sounn to Sapne Milun; Aadmi Aadmi Se Milta Hai; Jab Ishq Sikhata; Le Chala Jaan Meri; Sheher Sunsaan Hai; Tere Gham Ko; Woh Jo Hum Mein; Yaar Tha Gulzar Tha |
| April 27, 2004 | Ghazal Ka Safar (Vol.1) | Khabar-E Tahaiyure; Tujh Lab Ki Sifat; Aake Sajda Nashin; Ve Soorate Ilaahi; Sare Shaam Usne; Yeh Aarzoo Thi; Dil-E Naadan |
| May 16, 2004 | The Essential | Har Tarannum; Ae Dil Nasheen; Rang Baten Karen; Haq Maula; Ab Yeh Aankhen; Aandhee Chali To; Jadon Ishq Laga; Preetam Mat Pardes; Kiya Sar-O-Kaar |
| August 30 2004 | Heer By Abida | Ishq Jannat Zameen Te Le Aaya Ae; Heer Da Husn Behisaab Yaaro; Heer Da Ishq Heer Wang Sachcha Ae; Daras Ishq Da Keejiye ji; Ishq De Pichche Bane Faqir Aashiq; Ishq De Janaaze Da Nazara Yaaro |
| November 30 2004 | Live in Concert at the Royal Festival, London | 4 tracks named "Live in concert May 2000" |
| July 12, 2005 | Ishq: Supreme Love | Mein Nara E Mastana; Har Ke Tabli Haq; Dar Bhi Mein Darban Bhi Mein..; Chelo Ri Sayyan Chareha dekhein; Andar Hun Te Bahar Hun; Peren Pawan Di San; Lakh Naz Si Kho |
| September 8 2005 | Euphoric Sufis | Also features Kailash Kher, Sonu Kakkar, Richa Sharma |
| 2005 | Kuch Is Ada Se Aaj | Takleef-e-hijar de gayi; Dard-e-dil bhi ghame; Kuchh is ada se aaj; Ishq ka raaz agar na; Le chala jaan meri; Aap ki yaad aati rahi; Tere aane ka dhoka sa; Sauda ho to aisa ho; Aadmi aadmi sa milta hai |
| 2005 | Latthe Di Chadar | Latthe Di Chadar; Asan Ishq Namaz; Dama Dum Mast Qalander; Ik Nukte Wich; Kithe Mehar Ali; Mahi Yaar Di Ghadoli; Menda Ishq Wi Tu; Mera Ruthra Yaar |
| January 1, 2006 | Lok Virsa (Vol.1) | Interview; Sade Vehre Aya Kar; Medy Piya; Ishq Vee Tu; Parchaan Shalla |
| January 1, 2006 | Lok Virsa (Vol.2) | Parchaiyan; Aandhi Chali To Naqshe; Mehr Ali; Yaar Di Ghadoli Bhardi; Laggi Walyan Di |
| January 30, 2006 | Euphoric Abida | Naraye Mastana; Hairaan Hua; Man Laago; Wah Wah Ramz; Jis Din Se; Mera Sona Sajan; Meri Bukkal Di Vich; Soun Tow Sapne |
| August 22 2006 | Live In Concert – Svar Utsav (Vol.1) | Ali Maula; Tere Ishq Nachaya; Sang Har Shaqs; Are logo; Naz ki niyo |
| August 22 2006 | Live In Concert – Svar Utsav (Vol.2) | Kripa Karo; Menda Ishq; Mast Qalandar; Ghungharva; Aaj Rang Hai; Ho Jamalo |
| 2006 | Hazrat Shah Hussain | Meda Raanjhan Raawal Mange; Rabba Mere Haal Da; Sajjan De Hath; Mere Saahiba; Rahiye Naal Sajjan De Rahiye; Mera Sohna Sajjan Ghar Aaya |
| January 23 2007 | Are Logo Tumhara Kya | Are Logo Tumhara Kya; Chalo Ri Saiyan Charcha; Sanoon Ishq Laga Hai; Mujhko Bata Ae Qaziya; Hun Menoon Kaun Pehchane; Hairan hua Hairan; Meri Bukal De Vich; Hind Sindh Da Shahzada |
| January 27 2007 | Live In UK (Vol 1 to 4) | Jab Se Too Ne Mujhe; Kal Chaudhwin Ki Raat Thi; Har Tarannum Mein Mili Hai; Rang Baten Karen; Der Lagi Ane Mein; Kithe Mehr Ali Kithe Teri Sana; Lathe Dee Chadar; Mahi Yaar Di Ghadoli; Ik Nukte Wich Gal Mukdi Ae; Laal Meri Pat; Mera Roothra Yaar Nahin; Asan Ishaq Namaz; Medha Ishq Ween Toon; Andhi Chali to; Neeyat e Shauq Bhar Na Jaye; Maika-e-Saaz Hoon Main; Jab Se Toon Ne Mujhe Deewana; Shehr Sansan Hae; Yeh Mojza Bhi Mohabbat Kabh; Yaar Tha Gulzaar Tha; Tere Gham Ko Jaan Ki Talash Thi; Hamko Yaan Dar Badar Phiraya yaar Ne; Khe Ghunghroo Toot Gaye |
| January 27 2007 | Janaan (Vol.2) | Same tracks as Janaan (Vol.1) but with Dr. Amjad Pervez's voice as well |
| January 30, 2007 | Ishq Mastana | Mera Khamosh Reh Kar Bhi; Main Hosh Mein Hoon; Main Nara-a-mastana; Aye Yaar Na Mujhse; Humko Yaa Dar Dar Phiraya Yaar Ne; Sair Hai Tujhse Meri Jaan; Takleef-a-hijar de Gayi; Ve Soortain Ilahi |
| 2007 | Ishq Qalander | Ali Maula Ali; Jhoole Laal Sakhi; Ishq Hoya; Mele De Din Aye; Jhoom Jhoom; Ae Mehndi; Ali Ummat Da Ae Rakha; Main Soofi Hoon Sarmasta; Ali Ali Keh; Maula Hussain |
| 2007 | Laal Shahbaz Ki Chadar | Paie Nobat Wajdi; Laal Shahbaz; Meri Rooh Wich Wasda; Karo Nighawan; Ishq Di Tumb; Mehndi Jhoole Laal; Aya Mela Sakkhi Laj; Deedar Sohne Da |
| 2007 | Suneharaa Saal | Comprises 18 tracks featuring Taufiq Karmali in almost all, this album was released to commemorate the Golden Jubilee The Aga Khan, and was produced through His Highness Prince Aga Khan Shia Imami Ismaili Council for the United Kingdom. |
| January 31 2008 | Ghalib by Abida Parveen | Koi Umeed Bar; Bekhudi Besabab; Ibn-e-Maryam; Nuktachin; Har ek Baat; Yeh na thi Hmari; Hazaroon Khwashein; Husne Gamze; Dil-e-Naadan; Dil hi to Hai |
| October 2008 | Rohani Kaifiyat | Naina Milikay; Pehran Pondi San; Parchan San Pehlwar; Sahe Mardan Sherye Yazdan; Reham Karo Rehman; Jab Se Tu Ne |
| 2008 | Jeway Saiyaan | Asaan Ishq Nemaaz; Dil Lag Gai; Ek Nukta Yaar; Ishq Na Derda; Meda Dil Ranjhan; Sadhe Whairay; Teno Kal Na Kai |
| October 29 2009 | The Very Best of Abida | Chhaap Tilak; Bulle Noon Samjhavan; Le Chala Jaan Meri; Man Kunto Maula; Mera Sohna Sajjan; Dil – E – Naadan; Shaam – E – Firaq; Main Naraye Mastana |
| 2009 | Zikr – Soul of Sufism, Vol. 1 | Chale laal; Lal da Sakhi; Hai mastiyon; Bolo bolo; Ya Ali; Main jana; Jhuley laal; Jaag Utte Maula; Chadar laal di |
| 2009 | Thumri and Ghazal | Bolhay No Sumjhawan Ayi Behana Tay Bahrjai; Dekhay Bina Nahi Chain; Hum Na Nakhat Hain Na Gul Hain; Kab Aaogay Mora Jiyara; Narya Mastana; Tum Ko Hum Khak Nasheenoon Ka Khayal; Ya To Afsar Mera Shahana Banaya |
| 2009 | Rukh-E-Murshid | Tu Hi Maula Mere Maula; Samaya Hai Meri Aankhon Mein; Mukhra Peer Najeeb da Vekheya; Sakhi Sahiban Munja Maula; Ishq Jaga Hai Murshid Man Mein; Main to Piya Sang Nain Mila; Maula Tero Naam Japoon Subha; Main to Tere Rang Rangi Hoon; Mera Peer Mehboob Haq; Sakhi Piya Hori Khelan Aaya |
| November 25 2010 | Passage to India: Traditional | Also features Nusrat Fateh Ali Khan, Sultan Khan, Mehdi Hassan, Hariharan, Suresh Wadkar and others |
| November 28 2010 | Roohani Mehfil (Vol.1) | Ek Nuktay Wich Gal; Are Logo; Ghoom Charkhra; Ronde Umar; Lagi Walian No; Meda Ishq bhi To; Jab Se Tu Ne; Tere Ishq Nachaya; Mahi Yaar Di |
| November 28 2010 | Roohani Mehfil (Vol.2) | Yar Ko Hum Ne; Saadhe Vere; Mera Ruthra Yaar; Nagdra Nimani; Dumaa Dum Mast Qalandar; Asaan Ishq Nemaaz; Ishq Na Derda; Dil Lag Gai; Parchan Shaal Pehlwar; Kithe Meher; Suun Baat Barh De Kahi |
| January 24 2011 | Qalander Asra Hai | Qalander Asra Hai |
| April 22, 2011 | The Sufi Queen (Vol.1) | Raanjhan; Wah Wah Ramz Sajjan; Ab Lagan Lagi; Chashme Masti; Hairan Hua Hairan Hua; Man Lago Yaar Fakiri Mein |
| December 16, 2011 | 30 Greatest Hits Abida Parveen and Noor Jehan | Hum ko pasand; Preetam pat pardes; Ajab nain; Naraye Mastana; Nahin nigah; Gul huyi; Humnay sab; Yeh Jafa-e-gham; Sheher sunsaan; Woh jo; Tere Gham ko; Mera Sohna; Aadmi Aadmi; Shaam-e-Firaaq |
| November 18 2011 | Treasures (Vol.1) | Rang batein; Niyat shauq; Pritam; Dil Nasheen; Har taranumm; Ab yeh ankhein; Tere Gham; Hum na Nakhat |
| January 2 2012 | Eternal Abida | Ho jamalo; Ali maula; Mast qalandar; Tere Ishq Nachaya; Are Logo |
| March 10 2012 | 30 Hits – 3 Great Artists | 10 tracks of Parveen are chosen, three of which are remixed by DJ Whosane. |
| August 7 2012 | Lal De Rang Vich Rangi Aan | Lal De Rang Vich Rangi Aan; Talu-e-Sehar; Jehan Mein Noor; Mera Ghazi; Sadey Wal; Naad-e-Ali; Maula Hussain; Mere Mushkil; Mann Kunto Maula; Mein Lalan Di Mastani |
| August 21 2012 | Sufiana safar | Hum ko; Ya Ali; Tera faqir; Sanun ishq; Hun mainu; Qalander Laal; Ya Ali Madad; Tere ishq; Mere bukal Mast Mast; Mahi Yaar; Chadar Jhuley; Chale Laal Sakhi; Main jana; Laal da; Jhuley laal; Saaiyan; Shab-e-firaq |
| 2012 | Tera Lal Sakhi Mera Lal Sakhi | Tera Lal Sakhi Mera Lal Sakhi; Keeta Murshid; Maye Ni Main; Ek vari; Sindh ke Shehenshah; Lal Qalandar; Main mehndi; Ek tara; Jagat k ameer; Saiyan sehra |
| 2012 | Shaane-e-Ali | Ali Ke Saath Hai Zohra (feat. Amjad Ghulam Fareed Sabri); Maula Ali; Hussain; Naad-e-Ali; Jagat k; Har soo Ali; Ek tara; Mushkil kusha; Ali Ali |
| 2012 | 30 Sufi Bestsellers | Comprises 30 tracks |
| February 10, 2013 | Ghazal Ka Safar (Vol.2) | Woh Jo Hum Mein; Sheher Sunsaan Hai; Yaar Tha Gulzar Tha; Tere Gham Ko; Aadmi Aadmi Se Milta Hai; Jab Ishq Sikhata; Le Chala Jaan Meri |
| July 21 2013 | Ru-e-Ali | Kaaba E Dil Qibla; Khuda Jaane Kahaan Se; Duniya mein Aise Aur Nigah; Aye Jaan E Do Aalam; Maslon Ko Munh Se |
| October 29, 2013 | Best of Sufi Queen | Comprises 40 tracks |
| November 16, 2013 | The Sufi Queen (Vol.2) | Hum Ko Pasand Yaar Ki; Preetam Mat Pardes; Ajab Nain Tere; Main Naraye Mastana; Nahin Nigah Mein Manzil; Gul Huyi Jaati Hain; Yeh Jafaa E Gham Ka Chara; Hamne Sab Sheher Mein; Sheher Sunsaan Hai; Woh Jo Hum Mein; Naraye Mastana; Tere Gham Ko; Mera Sohna Sajan; Aadmi Aadmi Se Milta Hai; Shaam E Firaq |
| November 24 2013 | Shah jo Risalo | Comprises 30 chapters. A 12-volume CD was recorded with help of Sindh Culture and Tourism Department. Launched at Mohatta Palace with the vocal assistance of Sanam Marvi and Humera Arshad. |
| 2013 | Top 10 Sufi | Comprises 10 tracks |
| January 1, 2014 | Treasures (Vol. 2) | Tuhnji Tand Kanwar; Ek nuqta; Yeh arzoo; Humsafar; Asan ishq; Yeh batein; Tati ro ro; Shehr Sunsaan |
| April 2, 2014 | Zikr – Soul of Sufism (Vol. 2) | Meri Bukal; Hum ko dar; Aaj more ghar; Sanu ishq; Sade Vehre; Tere Ishq; Mahi yaar di; Hun mainu; Tera Faqir hoon |
| April 8, 2014 | 50 Greatest Sufi Hits Best of Abida Parveen | Comprises 50 tracks |
| April 29, 2014 | 50 Greatest Sufi Hits - Nusrat Fateh Ali Khan & Abida Parveen | 25 tracks of Parveen have been chosen. |
| May 13, 2014 | 100 Gems – Sarhad Paar Se | Chale Laal Sakhi De Dwar; Meri Bukal De Wich Chor; Chadar Jhule Lal Di; Sanu Ishq Laga Hai Pyare Da; Mein Jana Laalan Jaane; Sadey Vehre Aaya Kar; Bolo Bolo Sare Ya Ali Madad; Hun Mainu Kaun Pachhaney; Humko Dar Dar Phiraya Yaar Ne; Jag Utte Maula Hussain Aa Gaye; Tere Ishq Nachaya; Laal da Diwana Sakhi; Jhule Laal Jive Laal |
| June 17, 2014 | Tasawwuf | Sanu Ishq Laga Hai Pyare Da; Mast Mast Jhule Lal Qalander; Mahi Yaar Di Gharoli; Tere Ishq Nachaya; Bolo Bolo Sare Ya Ali Madad; Mujhko Bata Aey Qaziya; Chale Laal Sakhi De Dware; Ya Ali Shahey Ali; Jhule Laal Jive Laal; Qalander Laal Sohna; Hun Mainu Kaun Pachhaney; Chadar Jhoole Lal Di; Main Jaana Laalan Jaane; Saaiyan; Tera Faqir Hoon Maula |
| June 24, 2014 | 50 Greatest Punjabi Best of Sufi | Five tracks by Parveen were selected. |
| Dec 31, 2016 | Athar-Bilal Films | Mulk-e-Khuda |
| Oct 31, 2017 | Ahat Si | Athar Bilal Films in collaboration with Saima Ajram Films |
