= Zaheen Shah Taji =

Sufi saint and poet (1902–1978)

Baba Zaheen Shah Yousufi Taji
- بابا ذھین شاہ یوسفی تاجی
- Born: Mohammad Tuaseen (محمد طؔآ سین); 1902; Jhunjhunu, British India
- Died: July 23, 1978 (aged 75–76); Karachi, Pakistan
- Occupations: Sufi; philosopher; poet; scholar
- Known for: Silsila Yousufia Tajia

Baba Zaheen Shah Yousufi Taji (Urdu: بابا ذھین شاہ یوسفی تاجی, 1902 – 23 July 1978), born Muhammad Tuaseen (Urdu: محمد طاسین), was a Pakistani Sufi Urdu poet, philosopher and scholar.

== Biography ==
He was born in Jhunjhunu, Rajasthan, British India. He was in the direct lineage of the Islamic Caliph Umar Farooq and was adapted in Chishtia he was also part of family of Great sufi Saint Khawaja Hameed uddin Nagori who adopt order of Sufism by Syed Muhammad Moinuddin Chishti Ajmeri. Zaheen Shah Taji was the disciple of Baba Yousuf Shah Taji, who was disciple of Tajuddin Baba of Nagpur.

His maternal grandson was Mazhar Ali, one of the most important actors on Pakistan television during the 1980s and the 1990s.

=== Literary skill ===
He has written many books and Ghazals in Urdu language while he knew Persian, Arabic, English and Hindi languages as well. He used Zaheen as a pen name in his poetry.

== Works and influence ==
Zaheen Shah Baba translated two important works of Ibn Arabi Fusus-ul-Hukm and Fatuhat al-Makiyyah and also translated Al-Hallaj's Kitab-ut-Tawaseen in Urdu amongst many other books in Urdu and Persian the most prominent being the Taj-ul-Auliya (biography of Baba Tajuddin of Nagpur. Prominent scholars who used to attend his gatherings were Maulana Mahir-ul-Qadri, Prof. A. B. A. Haleem, Prof. Karrar Hussain, Maulana Kausar Niazi, Hasrat Kasganjvi, Jaun Elia, Faiz Ahmad Faiz, Ahmad Faraz, Raghib Muradabadi, Ilyas Ishqui, Abul Khair Kashfi, Josh Malihabadi, Rais Amrohvi and Syed Muhammad Taqi.

His poetry books Āyāt-i Jamāl, Lam Aat-e-Jamal, Jamal-e-Ayyaat, Ajmaal-e-Jamaal are very famous in the Urdu poetry circles. He had also written a book titled Tajul Auliya about his grand Pir-o-Murshid Hazrat Tajuddin Auliya Nagpuri's life and events. His books in pdf format are available on Internet which can be linked through the Facebook page of Baba Zaheen Shah Taji (RA) Foundation.

== See also ==
- List of Pakistani poets
- List of Urdu language poets
