= Hammad Niazi =

Pakistani Urdu language poet

- Born: August 1, 1984 (age 42); Telagang, Punjab, Pakistan
- Occupation: Urdu poet
- Writing career
- Language: Urdu
- Notable works: Khirki mein khwab, Zara nam ho
- Notable awards: Second position in the gazal competition held at the 2009 Annual Women’s Week at Fatima Jinnah Women University

Hammad Niazi (Urdu: حماد نیازی) is a Pakistani Urdu language poet. He writes ghazals and poems. He won the second position in the ghazal competition held at the 2009 Annual Women’s Week at Fatima Jinnah Women University.

== Career ==
Niazi's two poetry collections khirki mein khwab and zara nam ho have published. His poetry work is creative and new imagery. He has been appreciated by writers. H e is the joint secretary of a literary organisation Halqa-e Arbab-e Zauq, Lahore, Pakistan.

== See also ==
- List of Pakistani poets

== Bibliography ==
- khirki mein khwab
- zara nam ho
