= Liaquat Ali Asim =

Pakistani Urdu language poet (1951–2019)

- Born: 14 August 1951 Karachi, Sindh province, Pakistan
- Died: 29 June 2019 (aged 67) Karachi, Sindh province, Pakistan
- Occupation: Poet, linguist
- Language: Urdu

Liaquat Ali Asim (1951–2019) was a Pakistani Urdu language poet and linguist who served in Urdu Dictionary Board from 1980 to 2011, and retired as editor of the Board.

== Biography ==
Asim was born on Manora Island, Karachi on 14 August 1951. He was one of the youngest of his 8 brothers and 1 sister. He belonged to the Konkani community. He was a Konkani Muslim.

He worked for the Urdu Dictionary Board for three decades. Eight collections of his poetry have been published, which include Sabd-e-Gul (1977), Āngan Meiṉ Samandar (1988), Raqs-e-Wisāl (1996), Nasheeb-e-Shahar (2008), Dil Kharashī (2011), Bāġh To Sārā Jānāy Hai (2013), Nesh-e-Ishq (2017) and Mere Katbe Pe Uskā Naam Likho (2019). Asim died on 29 June 2019 in Karachi due to gallbladder cancer.
