= 1972 Language violence in Sindh =

1972 Language violence in Sindh occurred starting on 7 July 1972 when the Sindh Assembly passed The Sindhi Teaching, Promotion and Use of Sindhi Language Bill, 1972 which established Sindhi language as the sole official language of the province resulting in language violence in the Sindh province of Pakistan.

The proclamation of Sindhi as the official language of Sindh caused the Daily Jang, an Urdu language newspaper in Karachi, to publish a full-page story on their front page surrounded by a banner with the statement "Urdu ka janaza hai zara dhoom sey niklay" (It is the funeral of Urdu thus should be a flaunting one) by Rais Amrohvi.

== Violence ==
Violent clashes erupted in Karachi and other towns in Sindh Province, Pakistan, resulting in the deaths of at least 19 people on the third day of protests over the choice of Sindhi as the official provincial language. The demonstrations were triggered by a bill passing Sindhi as the official language instead of Urdu, spoken by half of Karachi's Muhajir population. The army was brought in to enforce a 24-hour curfew. In total, 47 people were killed in the unrest. Then President Zulfikar Ali Bhutto planned to meet with both language proponents to find a resolution.

== Aftermath ==
In 1972, when the PPP-led Sindh government declared Sindhi as the province's official language, groups of Muhajir students formed the Muttahida Tulaba Mahaz Karachi (MTMK). The movement started by organizing a protest-movement by changing the number plates of motor vehicles into Urdu alphabets and numerals and had vandalized English signboards. Riots later broke out between the Sindh police and the MTMK in Karachi and between Sindhi and Muhajir youth elsewhere in urban Sindh.

== See also ==
- 1972 Sindhi Language Bill
