= Majeed Amjad =

Punjabi writer, Urdu poet (1914–1974)

Majeed Amjad مجید امجد
- Born: 29 June 1914; Jhang, Punjab, British India
- Died: 11 May 1974 (aged 59)
- Education: Islamia College Lahore
- Occupations: Urdu poet, Bureaucrat
- Writing career
- Genres: Ghazal, Nazm
- Notable work: Shab-e-Rafta Ke Ba'ad

Majeed Amjad (Punjabi, Urdu: مجید امجد) (29 June 1914 – 11 May 1974) was an Urdu poet from Pakistan. One newspaper described him as a "philosophical poet of depth and sensitivity". His ghazals have been sung by various Pakistani singers.

== Personal life ==
=== Background ===
Amjad was born on 29 June 1914 in Jhang, a city in the Pakistani province of Punjab. He was taught by his maternal grandfather. Then for a few years he studied Arabic and Persian under the supervision of his maternal grandfather Noor Muhammad at a local mosque before enrolling in first grade in a government school. He obtained his Matriculation certificate in the first division from Islamia High School, Jhang. Two years later he completed his Intermediate exam, also in the first division from Government College, Jhang. Later he moved to Lahore for higher education that was not available in Jhang. He eventually received his bachelor's degree in 1934 from Islamia College Lahore.

During the Great Depression, economic opportunities were limited even for educated people like Amjad, who returned to Jhang and joined a weekly newspaper named Arooj. He remained as an editor of the newspaper until 1939 and regularly published his own prose and poetry. At the advent of the Second World War, a poem of his against the British Empire was printed on the front page of Arooj and the newspaper was forced to sack him. After that he found a job as a clerk in the Jhang District Board. In 1944, the government set up a civil supplies department to ration food and clothing. He passed an entrance exam and joined this department and served with the Food Department until his retirement in 1972. He lived in many small and large towns all over Punjab during his employment with the Food Department including Lyallpur (now Faisalabad), Gojra, Muzaffargarh, Rawalpindi, Arifwala, Lahore and Montgomery (now Sahiwal). In 1939 he married his cousin, a school teacher, but they had different opinions and divorced. Amjad lived the last 28 years of his life in Sahiwal, while his wife stayed in Jhang. He spent the last days of life in Farid Town Sahiwal where he died on 11 May 1974. He was buried in Loohlay Shah Graveyard, Jhang.

== Literary career ==
Amjad's first collection of poetry, Shab-e-Rafta, was published in 1958 for which he wrote a preface in verse. This was published by Naya Idara in Lahore and was the only collection published in his lifetime even though he had written steadily throughout his life. After his death, the manuscripts of his unpublished poetry were preserved by Javaid Qureshi who was then the deputy commissioner of Sahiwal. In 1976, Javaid Qureshi and others published a second collection of his poetry titled Shab-e-Rafta Ke Baad. It was not until 1989 that the Urdu critic Khawaja Muhammad Zakariya edited and published a complete collection of Amjad's works called Kuliyat-e-Majeed Amjad. Samira Gilani has published several articles on Majid Amjad's poems at the universities of Tehran and Punjab.

== Bibliography ==
- Shab-e-Rafta (شبِ رفتہ)
- Shab-e-Rafta Ke Baad ( شبِ رفتہ کے بعد)

== See also ==
- List of Pakistani poets
- List of Urdu language poets
