= Zahida Hina =

Pakistani journalist

- Born: Sasaram, Bihar, British India
- Education: University of Karachi
- Occupations: Writer; journalist; columnist; dramatist
- Spouse: Jaun Elia (m. 1970; div. 1984)
- Children: Zeryoun, Fainnana and Sohaina

Zahida Hina (Urdu: زاہدہ حنا) is a noted Urdu columnist, essayist, short story writer, novelist and dramatist from Pakistan

== Life ==
Zahida Hina was born in India, after the independence of Pakistan in 1947. Her name at the time of birth was Fehmida Lala Rukh which she later requested her father to change. Her father, Muhammad Abul Khair, emigrated to Pakistan and settled in Karachi, where Hina was brought up and homeschooled until she started her formal education from 7th class at Happy Home School.

She wrote her first story when she was nine years old. She graduated from University of Karachi, and her first essay was published in the monthly Insha in 1962. She chose journalism as a career in the mid-1960s.

In 1970, she married the well-known poet Jaun Elia.

Hina was associated with the Daily Jang from 1988 until 2005, when she moved to the Daily Express, Pakistan.

She now lives in Karachi.

Hina has also worked for Radio Pakistan, BBC Urdu and Voice of America.

Since 2006, she has written a weekly column, "Pakistan Diary", in Rasrang, the Sunday magazine of India's most widely-read Hindi newspaper, Dainik Bhaskar.

== Work ==
Hina has written more than 2,000 journalistic articles. Many of her short stories have been translated into English, Bengali, Hindi and Marathi. Some of her important titles are:

- Qaidi sans leta hai (collection of short stories)
- Titlian dhondhne wali (collection of stories)
- Raqs-i-bismil hai (collection of stories)
- Rah main ajal hai (collection of short stories)
- Na junoon raha na pari rahi (short novel)
- Dard ka Shajar (novel)
- Dard-e-Ashob (novel)
- Zard Paton ka ban (TV drama)
- The House of Loneliness (Hina's short stories translated into English)

She is a known critic of nuclear technology for any purpose (military or civilian).

Her books have been translated into English by Faiz Ahmed Faiz, Samina Rahman and Muhammad Umar Memon.

== Awards ==
- Faiz Award
- Literary Performance Award
- Saghir Siddiqui Adabi Award
- K. P. Award
- Sindh Speaker Award
- SAARC Literary Award in 2001 by the President of India

In August 2006, she was nominated for Pakistan's highest civil award, the Presidential Award Pride of Performance, which she declined as a mark of protest against the military government in Pakistan.
