= Moeen Faruqi =

Pakistani writer and artist

- معین فاروقی
- Born: Karachi, Sindh, Pakistan
- Years active: 1993–present
- Website: www.moeenfaruqi.com

Moeen Faruqi (born in Karachi, Pakistan) Urdu: معین فاروقی is a Pakistani artist and poet residing in Karachi.

His poems have been published in:

- Poetry from Pakistan: An Anthology, Oxford University Press (1997)
- Dragonfly in the Sun: An Anthology of Pakistani Literature, Oxford University Press (1997), Karachi.

As of 2026, the highest selling price for a piece of his artwork at auction is 4,608 GBP (approximately US $6,200.00) after buyer's premium for "Untitled (Two figures)" oil on canvas, sold through Bonhams London in September, 2026, to two US collectors.
