= 1972 Sindhi Language Bill =

Bill of law from the Sindh Assembly in Pakistan

Sindhi Language Bill

Provincial Assembly of Sindh
- Long title: The bill to provide Sindhi language official status in Sindh.
- Territorial extent: Pakistan: Sindh
- Enacted: 3 July 1972; 54 years ago
- Introduced by: Mumtaz Bhutto

Summary
- This bill granted official status to the Sindhi language in the province of Sindh, as a result Sindhi became the first language in Pakistan to have its own official status.
- Status: In force

1972 Sindhi Language Bill was introduced by the Chief Minister Mumtaz Bhutto on 3 July 1972, in the Sindh Assembly, Pakistan. The 1972 Language violence in Sindh occurred starting on 7 July 1972, when the Sindh Assembly passed the Sind Teaching, Promotion and Use of Sindhi Language Bill, 1972 which established Sindhi language as the sole official language of the province, resulting in language violence in Sindh. Due to the clashes, Prime Minister Zulfikar Ali Bhutto explained that this bill is not against Urdu language. Later an ordinance was also promulgated to clarify it. The original bill as passed by the Sindh Assembly on 7 July 1972 is still in place.

== Clauses ==
It provided inter alia that:

=== Clause 4 ===
- (1) Sindhi and Urdu shall be compulsory subjects for study in classes IV to XII in all institutions in which such classes are held.
- (2) The introduction of Sindhi as a compulsory subject shall commence at the lowest level namely class IV and by stages to be prescribed, be introduced in higher classes up to class XII.

=== Clause 6 ===
Subject to the provisions of the Constitution, the Government may make arrangements for progressive use of Sindhi language in offices and departments of Government including courts and the provincial assembly.

== See also ==
- 1972 Language violence in Sindh
- Sindhi language
- Sindhudesh
- Muhajir people
