= Saeed Ahmad Akhtar =

Pakistani poet and writer (1933–2013)

- Born: March 3, 1933; Pishin, Pakistan
- Died: August 20, 2013 (aged 80)
- Occupations: Poet, playwright

Saeed Ahmad Akhtar was an Urdu poet, playwright and educationist. He published his first Urdu poetry collection Diyaar e Shab in 1976. The book got several awards including the Abbasin Arts Council Award for the best book of the year. He published 12 Urdu poetry collections and one English poetry collection. He also wrote many plays and documentaries for Pakistan television and Radio Pakistan.

He was born on 3 March 1933 in Pishin, Pakistan. He completed his master's in English Literature from Peshawar University in 1958 and then master's in Urdu Literature from the same university in 1965. After working as a lecturer and professor of English in the provincial Education Department from 1954 onwards, he joined the West Pakistan Civil Service in 1968 as Assistant Political Officer. He served in many Districts of Khyber Pakhtunkhwa as Assistant Commissioner, Deputy Commissioner and Additional Commissioner for 22 years. He retired in 1990.

He belonged to Kulachi, Khyber Pukhtunkhwa and permanently settled in Dera Ismail Khan, Khyber Pakhtunkhwa. Poetry, music and educational social work remained the passion of his life. "Love for all and hatred for none" was the moving force of his life. He remained a member of syndicate and selection board of the Gomal University for years. Saeed Ahmad Akhtar participated in various symposia in Pakistan and abroad. He died on 20 August 2013.

== Literary contributions ==
- Diyaar e Shab (Anthology of Urdu poetry) 1976
- Sath e Aab (Anthology of Urdu poetry) 1978
- Chandni Ke Saaye (Anthology of Urdu poetry) 1981
- Khwabgeenay (Anthology of Urdu poetry) 1983
- Le Gai Pawan Uraa (Anthology of Urdu poetry) 1987
- Pata Toota Daal Se (collection of the 1st five books) 1987
- Pooja Ke Phool (Anthology of Urdu poetry) 2000
- Varshanjali (Anthology of Urdu poetry) 2002
- Songs from the Desert (Anthology of English poetry) 2003
- Abb Ke Bichray Kab Milain (Anthology of Urdu poetry )2007
- Door Paray Hain Jaa (Anthology of Urdu poetry) 2009
- Ghonghat Ka Patt Khol Ri( Anthology of Urdu poetry) 2010
- Baichay To Bik Jaoun (Anthology of Urdu poetry) 2011
- Samar Hayat Ka (Intikhab) (A selection from all collections) 2023

== See also ==
- List of Urdu Poets
- Urdu poetry
