= Ata Turab =

Pakistani poet (born 1977)

Ata Turab عطا تراب
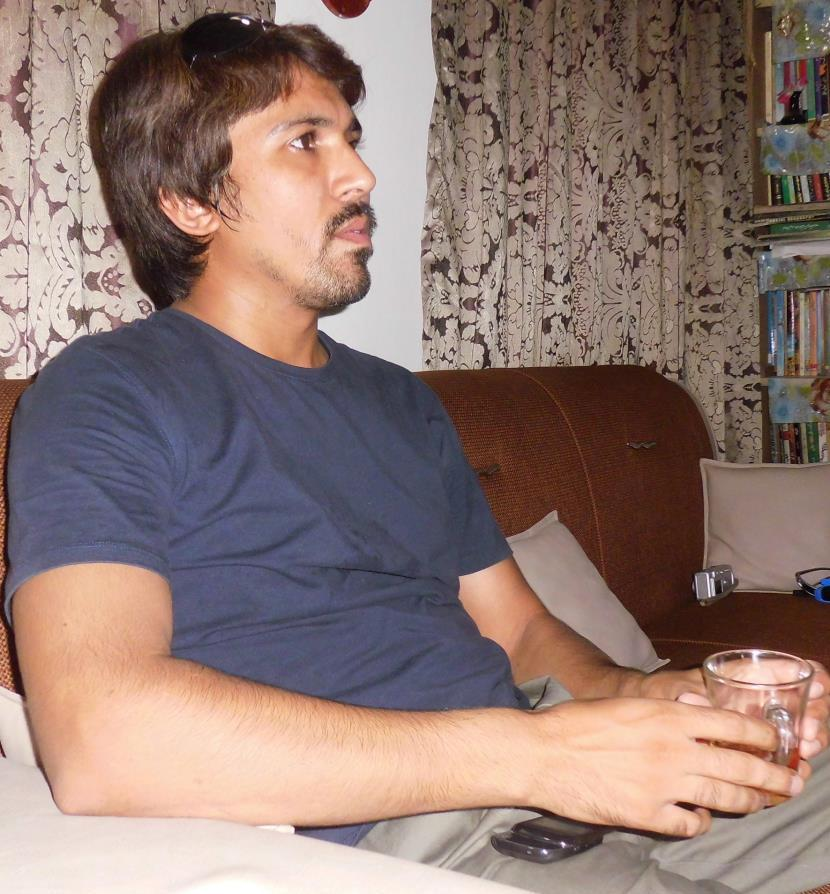
- Ata Turab
- Born: 7 January 1977 (age 49); Islamabad, Pakistan
- Occupation: Poet
- Known for: Social Issues raised in poetry
- Parent: Syed Zawar Hussain Shah
- Relatives: Hussain Naqvi

Ata Turab (Urdu: عطا تراب) is a Pakistani poet known for his poetry about romance. He studied Persian language from Iran.

== Personal life ==
Turab was born on 7 January 1977 and raised in Islamabad, Pakistan. He studied Arabic and Islamic Studies in Iran at the post-graduate level.

== Career ==
He has been involved in poetry recitals in the country and his works have been published in major literary magazines of Pakistan and India. He has been a television host on different channels of Pakistan. Turab translated many books from Persian and Arabic to Urdu language. He has also hosted television shows on Pakistan Television Network and Such TV. He has been writing for the last fifteen years. His book of poetry titled "Barish Main Shareek" ("Companion in the Rain") was published in December 2012. The major article among others on the book can be read on BBC Urdu by following the link.

== Reviews ==
"Turab’s poetry stays with you and, like with all good poetry, when you come back to it, it will say more to you than it did the first time. His verses illuminate their subject and move you with their message of rationality."

"Ata Turab's words also hold content relating to socio-political issues, philosophy, romance and journey into simple yet refined emotions. One finds Turab’s poetry an absolute long narrative, where the characters in words tease and engage, multiply and divide, arrest and surrender, probe and explore, love and hate, redeem and sin, live and die — but, always breathe, creating a sense of extinguishing the inner climate of mind and soul. He captures the horrors, glories, mundane existence, confrontations, demons, consequences, and what it is to be alive in a world full of facades that we human beings are classified to follow whether we agree or disagree."

== See also ==
- List of Pakistani poets
- List of Urdu-language poets
