= Mir Abu Turab's Tomb =

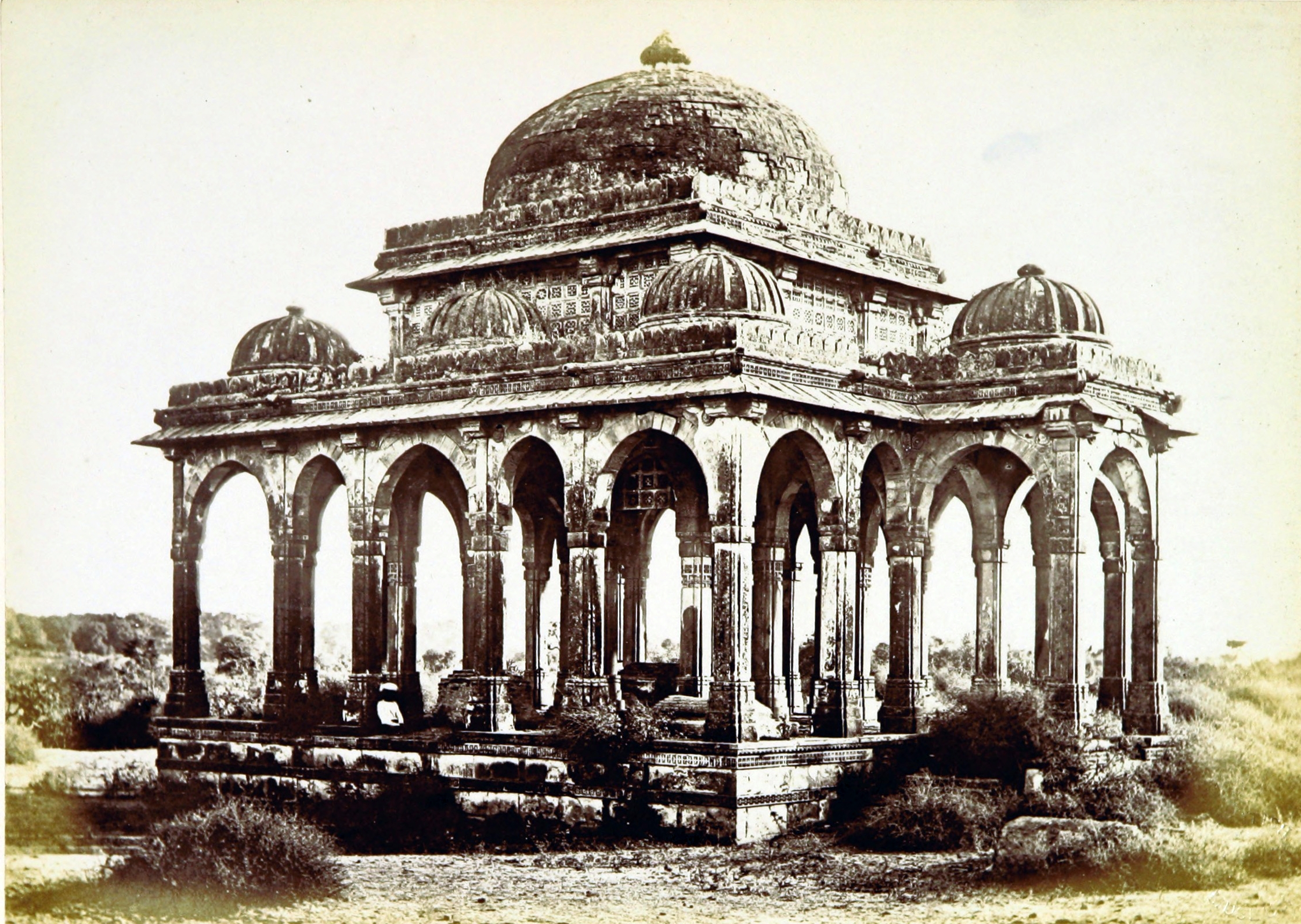
- Mir Abu Turab's Tomb, 1866

- Location in Ahmedabad, Gujarat, India Mir Abu Turab's Tomb (Gujarat)

Religion
- Affiliation: Islam
- Status: Active

Location
- Location: Behrampura, Ahmedabad
- Municipality: Ahmedabad Municipal Corporation
- State: Gujarat
- Coordinates: 23.004656°N 72.576626°E

Architecture
- Type: Tomb
- Style: Islamic architecture
- Founder: Mir Abu Turab
- Completed: 1597
- Designated as NHL: National Monument of Importance; ASI Monument No. N-GJ-44

Mir Abu Turab's Tomb, locally known as Qadam-e-Rasul ki Dargah is a medieval tomb in Behrampura, Ahmedabad, India.

== History ==
Mīr (or S̲h̲āh) Abū Turāb Walī b. S̲h̲āh Quṭb al-Dīn S̲h̲ukr Allāh a.k.a. S̲h̲āh Abū Turāb al-ʿUraiḍī al-Ḥusainī was a S̲h̲īrāzī (Salāmī) Saiyid and whose family were followers of the Saisalah-i-Maghrabiyah. His grandfather Saiyid Shah Mir was a scholar who emigrated from S̲h̲īrāz to Muhammadabad (Champaner), Gujarāt during the reign of Mahmud Begada, sulṭān of Gujarāṭ. Abū Turāb's first notable role was as the intermediary between the noble Iʿtimād K̲h̲ān and the Mughal emperor Akbar, when the former requested the latter to invade and annex Gujarat. In Akbar's 1572 invasion of Gujarāt, Mīr Abū Turāb among other nobles paid homage to their new emperor. When Akbar left Aḥmadābād, Abu Turāb was among the few nobles who chose to remain loyal to the emperor and not revolt.

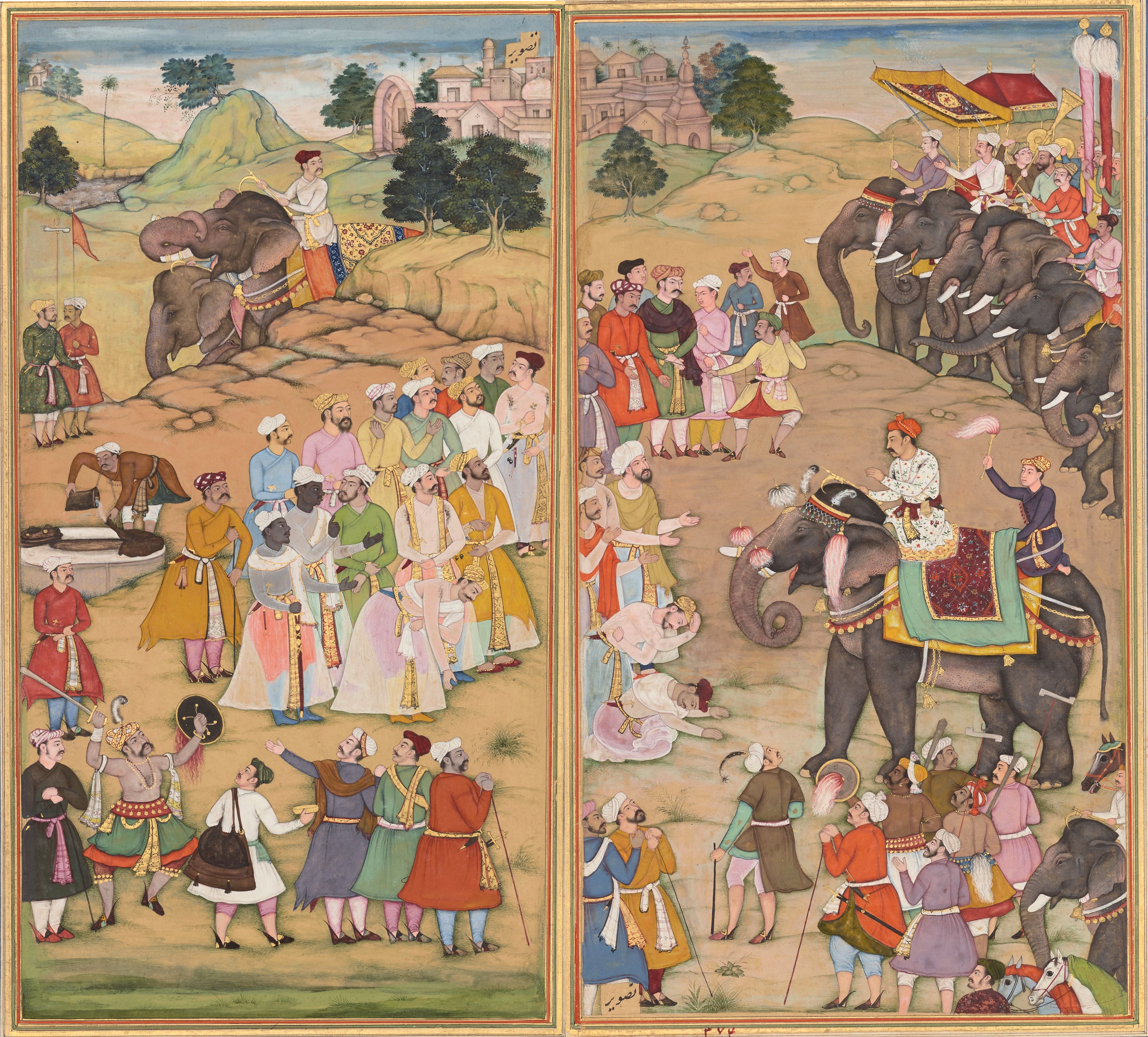
Iʿtimād K̲h̲ān (bowing in left and right folios) and the nobles of Gujarāt submit to Akbar (on center elephant in right folio) during the 1572 invasion. Mīr Abū Turāb was among the nobles historically present at this occasion.

In 1577, appointed Mīr-i Ḥajj (chief of the Mecca caravan), he brought back a large stone from Mecca with a right footprint of the Islamic prophet Muhammad (qadam-i Rasūl) in 1579. Taken first to Akbar at Fatehpur Sikri or Āgrah, Akbar received the stone with great respect and carried it on his shoulders for a hundred paces. The matching left footprint is believed to have been brought to Sulṭān Fīrūz S̲h̲āh years ago by Mak̲h̲dūm-i Jahāniyān. In 1530 the emperor granted permission for Abū Turāb to take to stone to Gujarāt where he had it placed in Asāwal. When in 1583 Iʿtimād was made Governor of Gujarāt, Abū Turāb followed him as Amīn-i ṣūbah. He fought alongside Iʿtimād during the rebellion of the old sulṭān of Gujarāt, Muẓaffar S̲h̲āh III, who at one point recaptured Aḥmadābād. Akbar granted Abū Turāb several villages near Khambhat where his descendants would reside. Abū Turāb died in 1595 and was buried in his mausoleum outside of Aḥmadābād in the village limits of Behrampura a.k.a. Asāwal. He also wrote Tārīk̲h̲-i Gujarāt, which traces the history of the Gujarāt Sultanate from the reign of Bahādur S̲h̲āh (1536) to the capture of Aḥmadābād by Muẓaffar S̲h̲āh III (1584). The stone was later removed from Abū Turāb's tomb and taken to Khambhat.

In 1695–96, during the reign of the emperor Aurangzeb, the government allocated 4,164 rupees for the repairs of the masjid in Muazzampur village and Abū Turāb's mausoleum in Asāwal.

The tomb was damaged in 2001 Gujarat earthquake and was restored in 2002 by Archaeological Survey of India.

== Architecture ==
Mir Abu Turab's tomb is simple and graceful, 12.5 sq m (forty-one feet) square platform with a double colonnade of pillars, the inner colonnade formerly enclosed by stone trellis work. Local in style the tomb shows the art in its best form. The flat lintels have throughout given place to the arch, and as no rich minaret bases clash with the plainness of the main building, the whole is uniform and pleasing. On each face three large and two small arches point to the presence of an octagonal dome, and, without confusing, relieve the sameness. The dome is supported by twelve pillars.

== Gallery ==
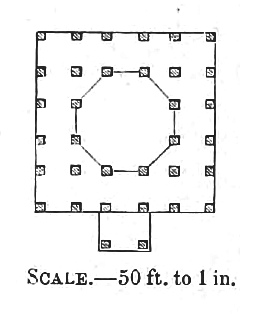
Plan of Tomb

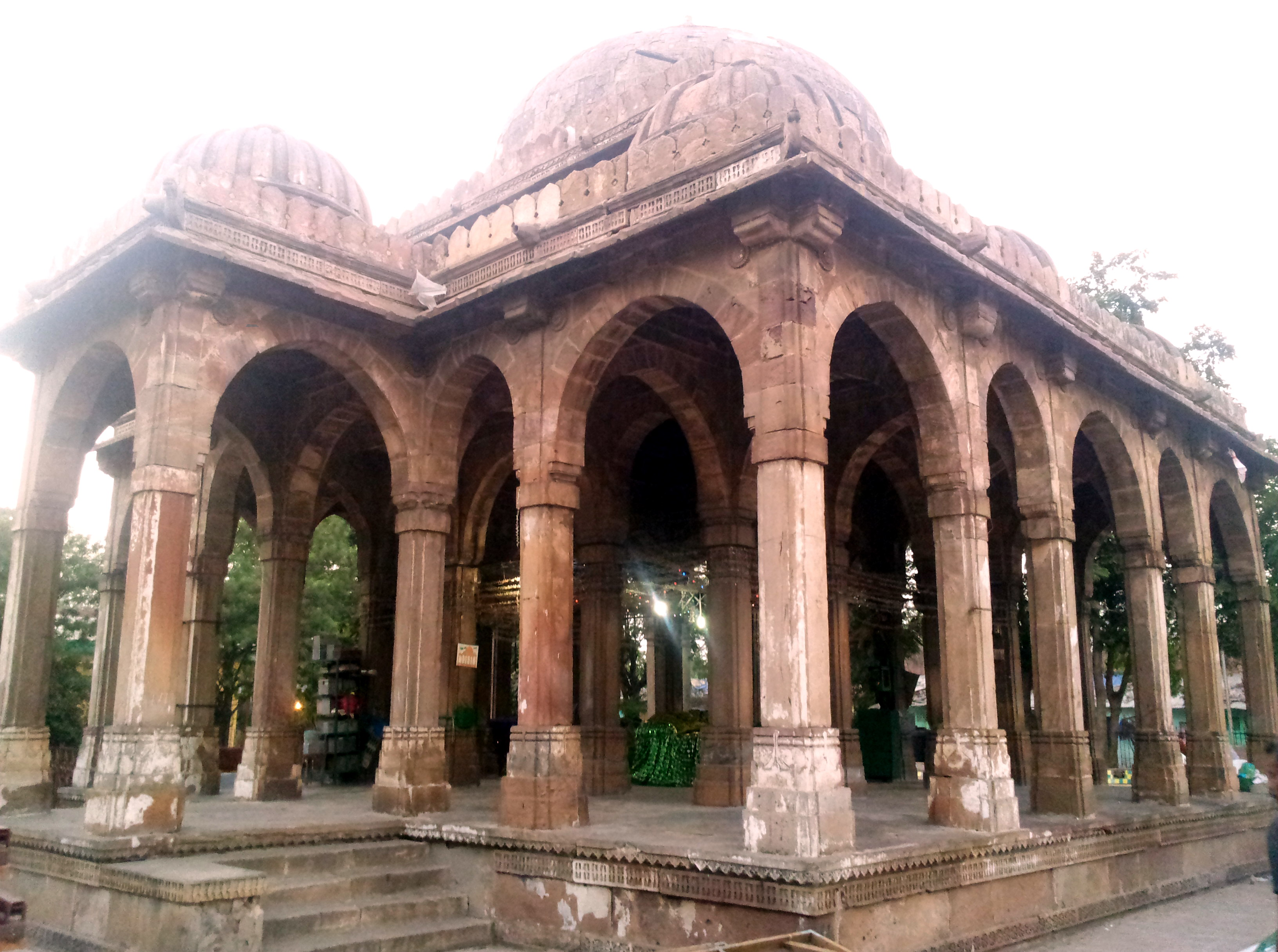
Pillars supporting the dome
