= Rais Amrohvi =

Pakistani poet (1914–1988)

Rais Amrohvi رئیس امروہوی
- Born: Syed Muhammad Mahdi; 12 September 1914; Amroha, United Provinces of Agra and Oudh, British India
- Died: 22 September 1988 (aged 74); Karachi, Sindh, Pakistan
- Occupations: Poet, journalist, parapsychologist

Syed Muhammad Mahdi (Note: Urdu: سید محمد مہدی) (September 1914 – 22 September 1988), commonly known as Rais Amrohvi, (Note: Urdu: رئیس امروہوی) was a Pakistani Urdu poet, paranormal investigator and psychoanalyst. He was known for his style of qatanigari (quatrain writing). He wrote quatrains for Pakistani newspaper Jang for several decade. He promoted the Urdu language and supported the Urdu-speaking people of Pakistan. His family is regarded as a family of poets. He was the elder brother of poet Jaun Elia.

The Sindh Assembly passed The Sind Teaching, Promotion and Use of Sindhi Language Bill, 1972 that created conflict and language violence in the regime of Prime Minister Zulfikar Ali Bhutto. Amrohvi wrote his famous poem Urdu ka janaza hai zara dhoom say niklay (It's Urdu's funeral, make it befitting!). He also intended to translate the Bhagavad Gita into standard Urdu.

He was also a scriptwriter, one of the movies he wrote being Waqt Ki Pukar (1967), a spy thriller about a journalist, based on his brother Muhammad Taqi, exposing anti-state elements and which anticipated the 1971 Bangladesh separation.

== Biography ==
Amrohvi was born on 12 September 1914 to a Shia Muslim family in Amroha, India. His father, Shafiq Hasan, was a scholar of literature and astronomy well-versed in the Arabic, English, Persian, Hebrew and Sanskrit languages, and who corresponded with leading intellectuals. He migrated to Pakistan on 19 October 1947 and settled in Karachi. He was known for his style of Qatanigari (quatrain writing). For several decades he published quatrains for Pakistan's daily newspaper, Jang. He was also a supporter of the Urdu language and the Urdu-speaking people of Pakistan. He established an institution Raees Academy where writers were trained in emotional and moral values.

He also published a number of books on the topic of metaphysics, meditation, and yoga. He was assassinated by virtue of his faith on 22 September 1988 by an extremist religious militant group.

== Publications ==
Poetry

- Alif
- Masnavi Lala-e-Sehra (1956)
- Pase Ghubar (1969)
- Qattat - I (1969)
- Qattat - II (1969)
- Hikayaat (1975)
- Ba-Hazrat-e-Yazdaan (1984)
- Malboos-e-Bahar (1983)
- Aasaar (1985)
- Kulliyat
- Naseemus sahar
- Zameer e khama

Other

- Muraqabah
- Ma'badun-Nafsiyaat (Parapsychology)
- Nafseyaat-o-Mabaad-an-Nafseyaat (3 vols)
- Ajaib-e-Nafs (4 vols)
- Le Sans Bhi Ahista (2 vols)
- Jinseyaat (2 vols)
- Aalam-e-Barzagh (2 vols)
- Hazraat-e-Arwah
- Hypnotism
- "Tawajjuhaat" (2 volumes)
- "Jinnaat" (2 volumes)
- "Aalam-e-Arwah" (2 volumes)
- Almiye e mashraqi Pakistan
- Achche Mirza
- Ana minal husain

== See also ==
- Jaun Elia
