= Haji Laq Laq =

British Indian poet (1898–1961)

- Born: 1898; Patti, Amritsar, British India
- Died: September 28, 1961 (aged 62–63)
- Occupations: Humorist, Urdu poet, journalist
- Writing career
- Pen name: Ata Muhammad
- Language: Urdu, Hindi

Haji Laq Laq (Urdu: حاجی لق لق, Hindi: हाजी लक़ लक़) (1898 – 27 September 1961), born Ata Muhammad, was a humorist, Urdu poet and journalist of the Indian subcontinent. He was commonly known as Haji Laq Laq, and also used Laq Laq as a Takhalus (penname).

== Biography ==
Haji Laq Laq was born in 1898 in Patti, Amritsar, India. He belonged to a well educated family. He wrote humorous poetry and also served on newspapers including Zamindar and Shahbaz. He served in the British Indian Army before dedicating himself to literary activities. Shorish Kasmiri has offered tribute to Haji Laqlaq in "No Ratan" and elaborated how these personalities merged literary skills in journalism. After partition he remained attached to weekly "chattan" of Agha Shorish Kashmiri and also wrote his autobiography "Sargozasht".

He was a mureed (disciple) of Maulana Nawab ud din Ramdasi (R.A) and he also used chishti after his name due to spiritual devotion. His serious works were written under the name Abu-allah Chishti. Haji Laq Laq died on 27 September 1961 in Lahore, Pakistan.

== Family ==
He was married to an Iraqi woman.

He had only one son, whose name is Abdur Rasheed Chishti and was in the British Indian Army like Haji Laq laq and also served in Second World War. Abdur Rasheed Chishti died on 1998 in Lahore, Pakistan.

== Publications ==
- Laglaga (1939)
- Adab-i-kaseef
- Dranti
- Adam-ul-lughaat
