= Lala Sehrai =

Pakistan Poet

lala sehrai لالہ صحرائی
- لالہ صحرائی
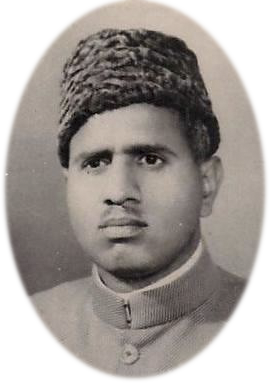
- Born: Muhammad Sadiq; 14 February 1920; Amritsar, British India
- Died: 7 July 2000 (aged 80); Multan, Pakistan
- Known for: Sufi, Natyh poetry, articles writer

Lala Sehrai, (Urdu: لالہ صحرائی) (2000–1920) was an Urdu poet and writer from Pakistan.

== Biography ==
=== Education ===
Sehrai's writings were published in magazines and newspapers of the country. He had special relationships and contact with well-known people. Due to his efforts, an All-Pakistan Mushaira was held in Jehanian in 1962, in which the leading poets from across the country participated. He was always presented in social services of the city of Jehanian. A square, Lala Sehrai Chowk, has been named after him In Jehanian in recognition of his services for the city.
