= Jaun Elia =

Pakistani poet (1931–2002)

Jaun Elia PP
- جون ایلیا
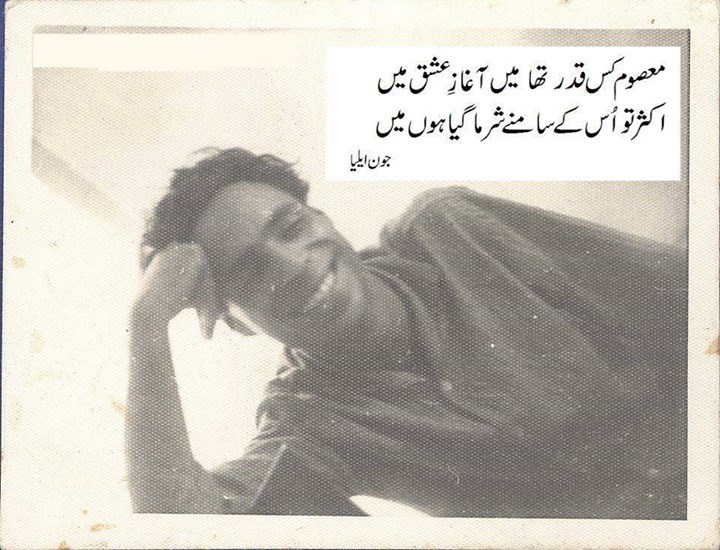
- Born: Syed Hussain Sibt-e-Asghar Naqvi; 14 December 1931; Amroha, United Provinces, British India
- Died: 8 November 2002 (aged 70); Karachi, Sindh, Pakistan
- Occupation: Poet
- Spouse: Zahida Hina (m. 1970; div. 1984)
- Relatives: Kamal Amrohi (cousin); Rais Amrohvi (older brother)
- Writing career
- Pen name: Jaun Elia
- Genre: Ghazal
- Notable works: Shayad, Yani, Lekin, Gumman, Goya, Farnood
- Notable awards: Pride of Performance award by the President of Pakistan in 2000
- Literary movement: Progressive Writers Movement

Syed Hussain Sibt-e-Asghar Naqvi (Note: Urdu: سید حسین سبطِ اصغر نقوی) (14 December 1931 – 8 November 2002), commonly known by his pen name Jaun Elia, (Note: Urdu: جون ایلیا) was a Pakistani poet.

One of the most prominent modern Urdu poets of ghazals (amatory poems), popular for his unconventional ways, he "acquired knowledge of philosophy, logic, Islamic history, the Muslim Sufi tradition, Muslim religious sciences, Western literature, and Kabbala".

He was fluent in Urdu, Arabic, Sindhi, English and Persian. Elia was the younger brother of poet Rais Amrohvi.

== Early life and family ==
Jaun Elia was born Syed Hussain Sibt-e-Asghar Naqvi on 14 December 1931 in Amroha, UP, British India into an educated Shia family. He was the youngest child of Allama Shafiq Hassan Elia. His father was a scholar of literature and astronomy well-versed in the Arabic, English and Persian languages, who corresponded with leading intellectuals like Bertrand Russell. Jaun Elia was the youngest among his siblings; his brother Rais Amrohvi was a poet and psychoanalyst while another brother, Syed Mohammed Taqi, was a philosopher and a translator who had translated Karl Marx's Das Kapital. Indian film director Kamal Amrohi was his first cousin. Another relative in Pakistan is the actor Munawar Saeed, famous for his roles as a villain.

Described as a child prodigy, Jaun was initially educated at the Syed-ul-Madaris in Amroha, a madrasa affiliated with the Darul Uloom Deoband.

== Marriage and children ==
He married writer Zahida Hina in the year 1970. He met her during the publication of the Urdu language magazine Insha and ended up falling in love with her. They got separated in 1984 and later divorced due to differences in their temperaments.

They have three children, Zeryoun Elia, Fainnana and Sohaina Elia.

== Writing career ==
He began writing poetry when he was 8 but published his first collection, Shayad, when he was 60.

== Political views ==
=== Partition and migration to Pakistan ===
Being a communist, Elia opposed the partition of India. However, he eventually migrated to Pakistan in 1956, and decided to live in Karachi.

=== Communism ===
In his poems, he supported communism in Pakistan. References to class consciousness are also noticeable in his poems. He has also been described as "An anarchist, a nihilist, and a poet".

== Death, legacy and popular culture ==
Jaun Elia died on 8 November 2002 at age 70 in Karachi, Pakistan. Some people that knew him called him a difficult, temperamental and complicated person. He also drank alcohol excessively which contributed to his health problems.

As per author Inam Abidi Amrohvi:

To understand Jaun Elia, one must delve into his poetry and philosophy, which say you must break yourself to build yourself.

Poet Pirzada Qasim said:

Jaun was very particular about language. While his diction is rooted in the classical tradition, he touches on new subjects. He remained in quest of an ideal all his life. Unable to find the ideal eventually, he became angry and frustrated. He felt, perhaps with reason, that he had squandered his talent.

According to BBC News website:

Jaun Elia's friend Qamar Razi once said of him, "He was quick to criticize, but he was a true friend, a lost traveler in his thoughts".

Noted Indian poet Majrooh Sultanpuri called him "the poet of poets"...

In 2020, Punjabi rapper Kay Kap's album Rough Rhymes for Tough Times featured a song entitled Bulaava which had couplets from the poem Pehnaayi Ka Makaan, written and recited by Jaun Elia.

In 2020, Pakistani rock-fusion band Nishtar Park released a single Purane Aur Naye Sawal which was based on Elia's ghazal Umr Guzaregi Imtihan Mein Kya.

In 2023, Urdu rapper Talha Anjum’s album Open Letter featured a song entitled Secrets which was strongly influenced by Jaun Elia’s poem Be-dilli Kya Yuhin Din Guzar Jaenge. Talha Anjum’s other works are also heavily influenced by Jaun Elia’s poetry.

=== Commemorative postage stamp ===
On his death anniversary on 8 November 2013, Pakistan Post Office issued a commemorative postage stamp in its 'Men of Letters' series to honor Elia for his literary services.

== Awards and recognition ==
- Pride of Performance award by the President of Pakistan for his literary services in 2000.

== Works ==
=== Poetry collections ===
- Sukhan Meri Udasee Hai
- Zakham-e-Umeed
- Mubada
- Tumharey Aur Mere Darmiyan
- Daricha Haye Kheyal
- Qitaat
- Jaun Elia Ki Tamam Ghazlain (parts I-III)
- Inshaye aur Mazaameen
- Farnood
- Shayad
- Firaaq
- Lekin
- Goya
- Gumaan
- Ramooz
- Ya'ni

=== Prose work (mainly translations) ===
Elia was not just a poet but was also an editor and a translator, especially of old Sufi, Mutazili and Ismaili treatises.

- Masih-i-Baghdad Hallaj,
- Jometria,
- Tawasin, usman
- Isaghoji,
- Rahaish-o-Kushaish,
- Hasan bin Sabah
- Farnod, Tajrid,
- Masail-i-Tajrid,
- Rasail Ikhwan al Safa

Above are some of his translations from Arabic and Persian. Not only did he translate these books but also introduced several new words in the Urdu language.

== See also ==
- Rais Amrohvi
- Rahat Indori
- Munawwar Rana
