= Mazhar ud din =

Indian author (1914–1981)

Hafiz Mazhar Ud Din Ramdasi
- Born: 1914
- Died: 1981
- Occupations: Islamic scholar, columnist, poet
- Writing career
- Pen name: Hassan Ul Asar
- Notable works: Kashmir anthem, "Mary watan teri jannat main aain gay ik din"

Hafiz Mazhar Ud Din Ramdasi (1914–1981), also known as Hassan Ul Asar, was an Islamic scholar, columnist, and Urdu poet. He wrote the Kashmir anthem, "Mary watan teri jannat main aain gay ik din" (میرے وطن تیری جنت میں آئیں گے اک دن).

== Published books ==
- Bab e Jibreel https://www.scribd.com/doc/52932866/Bab-e-Jibreel-Naatia-Kalam-by-Hafiz-Mazhar-Ud-Din
- Meezab https://www.scribd.com/doc/27163562/Mizab-Naatia-Kalam-by-Hafiz-Mazhar-ud-din
- Jalwa Gah https://www.scribd.com/doc/42422233/Jalwa-Gah-Naatia-Kalam-by-Hafiz-Mazhar-ud-Din
- Tajaliat https://www.scribd.com/doc/27501005/Tajalliyat-Naatia-Kalam-by-Hafiz-Mazhar-ud-Din
- Nishan e Rah I
- Nishan e Rah II
- Hadees e Ishq (Nishan e Rah III)
- Khatim ul Mursalin https://www.scribd.com/doc/47287988/Khaatam-ul-Mursaleen
- Shameheer o Sana
- Harb o Zarab
- Wadiye Neel (an Urdu transalarion of Arma Noosa Almisriya in Arabic by Jurji Zidan)
