= Hakim Nasir =

Pakistani poet (1947–2007)

Hakim Mohammad Nasir
- Born: 1947; Ajmer, Rajputana, British India
- Died: 28 July 2007 (aged 59–60)
- Occupation: Poet
- Writing career
- Notable work: "Jab sey tu nay mujhey deewana bana rakha hai'"

Hakim Mohammad Nasir (1947 – 28 July 2007) was a Pakistani poet who was widely known for his ghazal song "Jab sey tu nay mujhey deewana bana rakha hai" sung by Abida Parveen.

== Early life and career ==
Hakim Nasir was born in Ajmer, British India in 1947. He started his study from Ayurvedic and Unani Tibbia College, Delhi and joined his family traditions and became a herbalist. He also served as the president of Jamiat Ulama-i-Hind. After completion of his studies and practice in hikmat, he came back to his father in Ajmer and studied under his supervision. He served in many high-ranking positions in government departments and was also connected to Unani Tareeqa of Khawaja Dargah.

After the 1947 Partition of India, his immediate family had migrated to Karachi, Pakistan. To make a living, his parents set up a herbal medicine business called Nizami Dawakhana on Burnes Road in Karachi. Hakim Nasir inherited and ran that business after his parents passed away. He served thousands of patients. His brother Hakim Muhammad Jalal Ahmed and his sons Hakim Muhammad Umer, Hakim Muhammad Abdul Rehman, and Hakim Muhammad Abdullah continued the business.

He siblings included brothers Hakeem Muhammad Taqi’uddin Ahmed (late), Hakeem Muhammad Kamaluddin Ahmed (late) and Hakeem Muhammad Jalaluddin Ahmed and 6 sisters.

== Death and legacy ==
Hakim Nasir had suffered brain hemorrhage two days before his death on Saturday, 28 July 2007. He died at the age of 60.
