= Iqbal Azeem =

Urdu poet and scholar (1913–2000)

Syed Iqbal Azeem
- سید اقبال عظیم
- Born: 8 July 1913; Meerut, United Provinces of Agra and Oudh, British India
- Died: 22 September 2000 (aged 87); Karachi, Pakistan

Education
- Education: University of Lucknow; Agra University; University of Dacca

Philosophical work
- Era: Modern era
- Region: Islamic Philosophy
- School: Sunni
- Main interests: Poetry

Syed Iqbāl Aẓīm (Urdu: سید اقبال عظیم; 1913–2000) was an Urdu poet and scholar of the Urdu language in the Bengal region in British India and Paksitan.

== Career ==
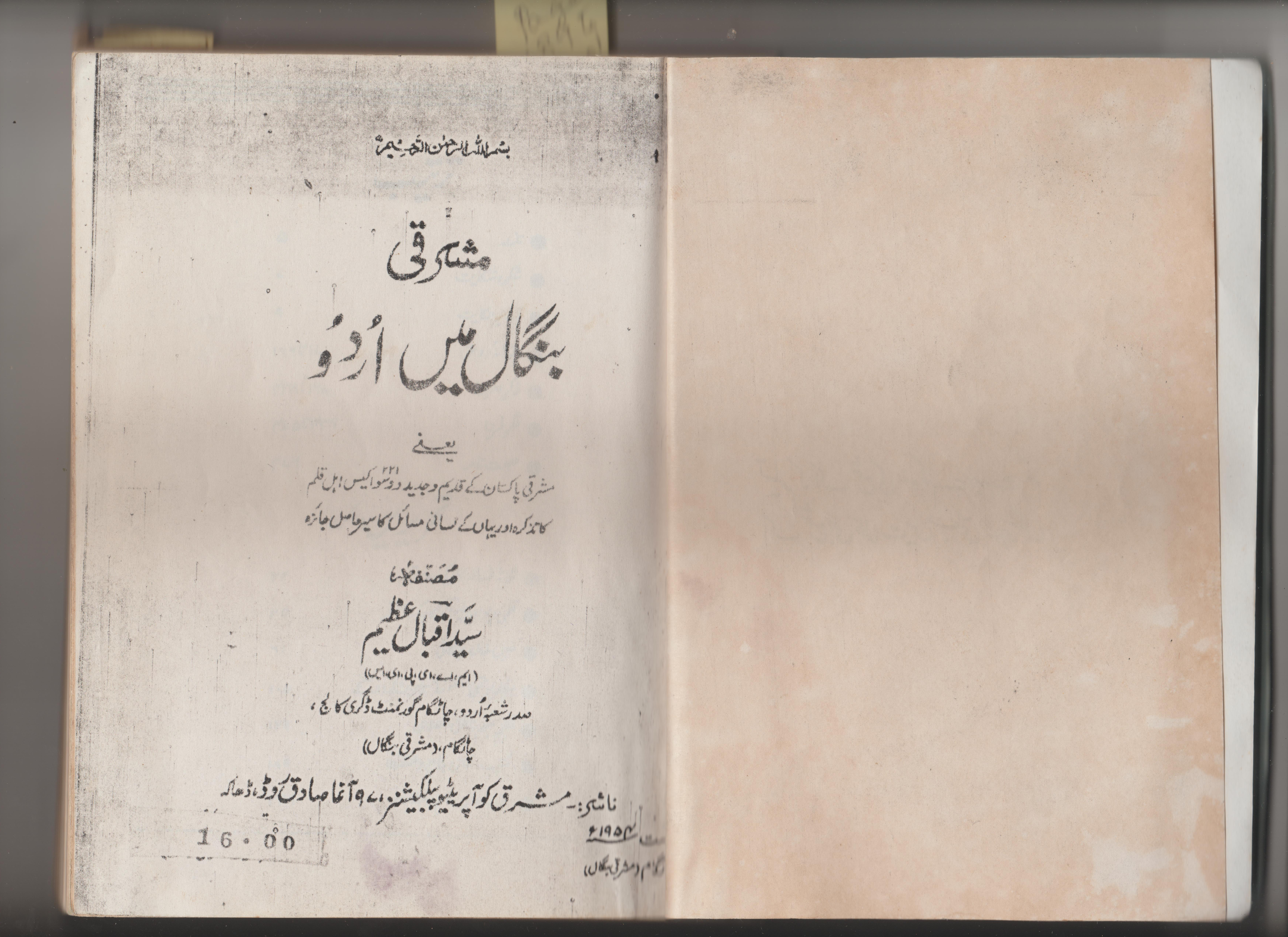
Cover of Mashriqi Bangal mein Urdu.

He was head of the Department of Urdu, Dhaka College and Chittagong College. He used to regularly attend mushairas in Dacca.

== Literary work ==
His works include Saat Sitaray, Chiragh-e-Akhir-e-Shab, Mahasal and Faslon ko Takalluf.

== See also ==
- Dhakaiya Urdu
