= Wazir Agha =

Pakistani Urdu linguist (1922–2010)

Wazir Agha وزیر آغا
- Born: 18 May 1922; Wazir Kot Sargodha district, British India
- Died: 8 September 2010 (aged 88); Lahore, Punjab, Pakistan
- Occupations: Urdu poet; writer; essayist; critic
- Writing career
- Notable awards: Sitara-e-Imtiaz

Wazir Agha (Urdu: وزیر آغا; 18 May 1922 – 8 September 2010) was a Pakistani Urdu language writer, poet, critic and essayist. He has written many poetry and prose books. He was also the editor and publisher of the literary magazine "Auraq" for many decades. He introduced many theories in Urdu literature. His most famous work is on Urdu humor. His books focus on modern Urdu poets, notably those who have written more poems instead of ghazals. Agha's poems mostly have an element of the story.

Agha was awarded the Sitara-e-Imtiaz (lit. 'Star of Excellence') for his contributions to Urdu literature. He was also nominated for the Nobel Prize.

== Early and personal life ==
Agha was born on 18 May 1922 in the village Wazir Kot in the Sargodha district. His father was a businessman from the Persian-speaking Qizilbash family who dealt in horses. Wazir's father obtained 750 acres (3.0 km^{2}) of land from the British government in the Sargodha district.

Agha learned Persian from his father, and Punjabi from his mother. During his school years, he developed a strong fondness for Urdu ghazals and started composing poetry on his own. He graduated from Government College, Jhang and later received his master's degree in economics from Government College, Lahore. He gained his PhD from the University of Punjab in 1956 for his research on humor and satire in Urdu Literature.

Wazir Agha died on 8 September 2010 in Lahore. He was buried in his native village, Wazirkot, near Sargodha, Punjab, Pakistan. He was survived by his son Dr Saleem Agha Qizilbash, also a writer.

== Literary career ==
Agha was the editor of the college magazine Chanab in Government College, Jhang. In 1944, he came across Salahuddin Ahmad who was the editor of the famous monthly magazine, Adabi Duniya. He encouraged Wazir Agha to write. He was asked to contribute by writing essays on topics uncommon in Urdu Literature of that time, such as economics, philosophy, psychology. In 1953, his work on "In search of happiness" was compiled as a book that opened a formal paradigm of research in Urdu literature.

From 1960 to 1963, he acted as a co-editor of Adabi Duniya and from 1965 onwards, he remained editor of monthly Auraq for many decades. He established himself as a critic.

The Pakistan Academy of Letters (PAL) has published a book on Agha's life and work as part of its publishing project, "Makers of Pakistani Literature". He was also Life Fellow of PAL since 1995. He also wrote an autobiography Shaam Ki Mundair Sey.

== Awards ==
- Sitara-e-Imtiaz (Star of Excellence) Award by the President of Pakistan

== Bibliography ==
Books

- Adab Mein Tanz-o-Mazah (1958)
- Takhleequi Amal (1970)
- Urdu Shairi Ka Mizaaj (1965)
- Tasawuraat-e- Ishq-o- Khird – Iqbal Ki Nazar Mein (1977)
- Majeed Amjad Ki Dastaan-e-Muhabbat (1991)
- Ghalib Ka Zauq-e-Tamasha (1997)
- Wazir Agha Kay Debachay (1990)

Essays

- Khayal Paray (Inshaiye or light essays)
- Nazam-e-Jadeed Ki Karwatein (1963)
- Tanqeed Aur Ehtesaab (1968)
- Naye Maqaalaat (1972)
- Naye Tanaazur (1979)
- Maani Aur Tanaazur (1998)
- Tanqeed Aur Majlisi Tanqeed (1975)
- Chai ki Piali main Toofan (1985)
- Tanqeed Aur Jadeed Urdu Tanqeed (1989)
- Daairey Aur Lakirein (1986)
- Inshaiye Kei Khad-o-Khaal (1990)
- Saakhtiat Aur Science (1991)
- Dastak Us Darwaazey Par (1994)
- Imtizaji Tanqeed Ka Scienci Aur Fikri Tanaazur (2006)

=== Poetry ===
- Ghaas Mein Titlian
- Aadhi Sadi ke Baad (After 50 years)
- Din ka Zard Pahar (Ghazals and Poems)
- Sham aur Saye (Poems)
- Ghazlen (Ghazals)
- Nardbaan (Poems)

== See also ==
- List of Pakistani poets
- list of Urdu poets
- List of Pakistani writers
- List of Urdu writers
