= Ehsan Danish =

Pakistani poet and linguist

- احسان دانش
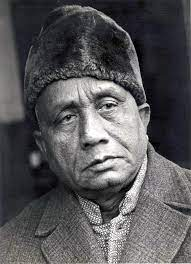
- Born: Ehsan-ul-Haq; 17 November 1914; Kandhla, British India
- Died: 22 March 1982 (aged 68); Lahore, Pakistan
- Occupations: Poet, prose writer, linguist & lexicographer
- Children: 5
- Writing career
- Period: 1914 - 1982
- Genres: Poetry, prose, linguistics & lexicography
- Subjects: Urdu Language & Literature
- Notable work: Jahan-i-Danish
- Notable awards: Sitara-e-Imtiaz (Star of Excellence) Award by the President of Pakistan (1978)
- Literary movement: Progressive Writers Movement
- Website: shazandanish.wixsite.com/ehsandanish

Ehsan Danish (Eḥsān Dāniš, 17 November 1914 – 22 March 1982), born Ehsan-ul-Haq Eḥsānu l-Ḥaq), was an Urdu poet, prose writer, linguist, lexicographer and scholar from Pakistan. Ehsan Danish penned over 100 scholastic books of poetry, prose, linguistics, lexicography and prosody. At the beginning of his career, his poetry was very romantic but later his poems addressed the lot of the labourers and he came to be called the "Šhāʿir-e Mazdūr" (lit "the workman's poet") by his audience. According to one commentator, his poetry inspired the common people's feelings and he has been compared with Josh Malihabadi. He holds the unique position as one of the best poets of all time, with fine, romantic and revolutionary, but simple style of poetry.

== Biography ==
Danish (birth name: Ehsan-ul-Haq) was born in Maulanan Kandhla, a small town in the Shamli district of Uttar Pradesh, India. He belonged to a poor family and he could not continue his studies due to financial reasons but still learned the Arabic and Persian languages on his own. His father's name was Danish Ali. Later he migrated to Lahore and settled there permanently. He struggled very hard to earn his living. He worked as an ordinary labourer for years in odd jobs, finally becoming a poet of excellence. His autobiography, Jahan-i-Danish, is a classic and has inspired many people. Danish wrote more than 80 books and hundreds of articles about and including poetry, prose, linguistics, philology, autobiographies and the famous interpretation of "Diwan-e-Ghalib". Much of his literary work is still unpublished.

According to family records, he had sons named Zeeshan Danish, Salman Danish, and Fozan Danish.

== Death and legacy ==
He died on 22 March 1982 in Lahore and was laid to rest at Miani Sahib Graveyard. His poetry and writings about the dignity of labour earned him the title of 'Shaer-i-Mazdoor' (poet of the labourers).

== Autobiography - Jahan-e-Danish ==
Ehsan Danish was a prolific prose writer who has authored hundreds of articles, essays and books in Urdu. His autobiography "Jahan-e-danish," was first published in 1973 by Ehsan Danish in Lahore, Pakistan and received the Adam Ji literary award in recognition of its literary value and linguistic stature.

== An excerpt ==
Maulvi Saeed talks of Ehsan Danish, the poet. He recalls:

"In 1928, when we lived in Mozang, I happened to be present at a gathering in the street adjoining ours where a short-statured but a well-built darkish young man recited a naat in a voice which kept the audience spell-bound". The poet was Ehsan-bin-Danish (now Ehsan Danish, for 'bin' though in Arabic stood for 'son of', in Hindi meant 'without'). The poet had come from across the Yamuna in search of employment – and perhaps recognition, too. Lahore gave him both; employment which hardly did any credit to this city, recognition, of course, which it never held back.

Ehsan was seen in the evening at the mushairas; in the morning, at the building sites with a brush in one hand and the lime-bucket in the other; or doing a gardener's job on the Simla Hill. He has recorded the experiences of his early days in a fascinating autobiography – Jahan-e-Danish. In the realm of poetry, he was not a mere labourer, but a master architect."

== Awards ==
- Sitara-e-Imtiaz (Star of Excellence) Award (1978) from the President of Pakistan.

== Publications ==
- Jahan-i-Danish, his autobiography.
- Jahan-i Diger
- Tazkir-o-Tanees
- Iblagh-i-Danish
- Tashrih-i-Ghalib
- Awaz sey Alfaz tak
- Fasl-i-Salasil
- Zanjir-i-Baharan
- Abr-i-Naisan
- Miras-i-Momin
- Urdu Mutaradifaat
- Dard-i-Zindagi
- Hadis-i-Adab
- Lughat-ul-Islah
- Nafeer-i-Fitrat
- Dasttoor-i-Urdu
- Ramooz-i-Ghalib
- Meerras-i-maumin
- Zakhm-o-Marham

== Ehsan Danish Poetry ==
Ehsan Danish was titled Poet-Laborer (Shair-e-Mazdoor) due to his revolutionary, passionate and novel poems for the laborers, the poor people and the oppressed. He had presented stark realities about the labor class in a powerful and unique style. He was initially impressed with the poet Josh Malihabadi's style of poetry.

yeh uDi uDi si rangat yeh khule khule se gesu
teri sub,h keh rahi hai teri raat ka fasana

== See also ==
- List of Pakistani poets
- List of Urdu poets
- Naz Khialvi
