= Aman ki Asha =

Campaign aiming for peace and development of relations between Pakistan and India

- Date: 1 January 2010
- Participants: Pakistan; India

Aman ki Asha (Urdu: امن کی آشا, Hindi: अमन की आशा, translation: "Hope for Peace") is a campaign jointly started by two leading media houses, The Jang Group of Pakistan, and The Times of India in India. The campaign aims for mutual peace and development of diplomatic and cultural relations between the two South Asian nations. It was established on 1 January 2010.

== Background ==
Aman ki Asha was inspired by the groundbreaking work of "Friends Without Borders", an international NGO, that launched bold, love-based people-to-people campaigns between the children and people of both countries between 2005 - 2007.

== See also ==
- Indo-Pakistani Confederation
- India-Pakistan relations
- Track II diplomacy
