= List of people on the postage stamps of Pakistan =

This is a list of people commemorated on postage stamps of Pakistan

Bahawalpur

== A ==
- A. K. Fazlul Huq, 'Pioneers of Freedom' stamp series (1990)
- Abdul Sattar Edhi, 'Social Welfare Icon, Great Humanitarian' postage stamp series (2016)
- A. B. A. Haleem, Vice-Chancellor, University of Sindh (1947-51), then Vice-Chancellor at University of Karachi (1951-1957), 'Men of Letters' stamp series (2003)
- Abdul Qayyum Khan (16 July 1901-22 October 1981), political leader of North-West Frontier Province now called Khyber Pakhtunkhwa, 'Pioneers of Freedom' postage stamp series (1990)
- Sir Abdullah Haroon, 'Pioneers of Freedom' stamp series (1990)
- Abdul Qadir (Muslim leader) or [Sir Sheikh Abdul Qadir (1874-1950)] 'Pioneers of Freedom' commemorative postage stamp series (1994)
- Abdus Salam, Nobel Laureate and physicist (1998)
- Abu Raihan Mohammad Ibn-Ahmad, al-Biruni, astronomer (1973)
- Abul Asar Hafeez Jalandhri (1900–82), poet who penned Pakistan's Qaumi Tarana (national anthem) (2001)
- Sir Adamjee Haji Dawood, (30 June 1880-27 January 1948), industrialist and philanthropist, 'Pioneers of Freedom' postage stamp series (1999)
- Muhammad Afzal Hussain Qadri, scientist (1912–74) (1999)
- Aga Khan III, (spiritual leader of the Ismailies) 'Pioneers of Freedom' stamp series (1977, 1990)
- Ahmed Ali (1910–94)- (Writer, Educationist), 'Men of Letters' stamp series (2005)
- Ahmed E. H. Jaffer (1909–90), 'Pioneers of Freedom' series (2000)
- Ahmad Nadeem Qasmi (1916–2006), (poet, journalist and writer), 'Men of Letters' postage stamp series issued in 2009 on his 3rd death anniversary
- Ahmed Pervez, painter artist (1926–79), 'Painters of Pakistan' stamp series (2006)
- Akhtar Shairani (1905-1948) (poet), 'Poets of Pakistan' series stamps (2005)
- Albert Schweitzer, medical doctor (1975)
- Al-Biruni (973-1048)-scholar (1973)
- Alexander Graham Bell, inventor (1976)
- Ali Imam (painter artist), painter artist (1924–2002), 'Painters of Pakistan' stamp series (2006)
- Allama Abdullah Yusuf Ali (1872-1953)-religious scholar and Quran translator into English (1996)
- Allama Mohammad Iqbal, poet and philosopher 'Pioneers of Freedom' postage stamp series (1967, 1974, 1975, 1977, 1990, 1997, 2002, 2005)
- Maulana Altaf Hussain Hali, Urdu poet and writer 'Pioneers of Freedom' postage stamp series (1979)
- Amir Khusrau, (1253-1325) master musician and inventor of new musical instruments (1975)
- Amir Timur, Central Asian ruler (1997)
- Anna Molka Ahmed, painter artist (1917–94), 'Painters of Pakistan' stamp series (2006)
- Armauer Hansen, medical researcher (1973)
- Asifa Bhutto Zardari, daughter of Benazir Bhutto (2009)
- Askari Mian Irani, painter artist (1940–2004), 'Painters of Pakistan' stamp series (2006)

== B ==
- Baba Farid also known as Fariduddin Ganjshakar, (12th and 13th century Sufi from the Punjab - lived during Ghauri to Balban ruling periods) (800th Birth Anniversary of Baba Farid - postage stamp series (1989)
- Sultan Bahoo (Sufi) Commemorative postage stamp series (1991)
- Bashir Mirza, painter artist (1941–2000), 'Painters of Pakistan' postage stamp series (2006)
- Benazir Bhutto, Prime Minister (1995, 2008, 2009)
- Abadi Bano Begum (affectionately known as Bi Amma, mother of Maulana Mohammad Ali Jauhar, 'Pioneers of Freedom' stamp series (1990)
- Burhan Wani (1994 - 2016) (Kashmiri freedom fighter) commemorative postage stamp issued (2018)
- Abdul Hamid Qadri Badayuni (1898 - 1970) 'Pioneers of Freedom' stamp series (1999)

== C ==
- Chaudhry Khaliquzzaman, 'Pioneers of Freedom' stamp series (1990)
- Chaudhry Ghulam Abbas 'Pioneers of Freedom' stamp series (1995)
- Chaudhry Muhammad Ali (1905-1980) 'Pioneers of Freedom' stamp series (1999)
- Choudhary Rehmat Ali, he is widely credited for coining the new country name "Pakistan" before its independence- 'Pioneers of Freedom' stamp series (1990)
- Copernicus, Polish astronomer (1973)

== F ==
- Faiz Ahmed Faiz, 'Poets of Pakistan' stamp series (1997)
- Farah Pahlavi, Iranian empress (1967)
- Fatima Jinnah 'Pioneers of Freedom' stamp series (1990, 1997, 2003)

== G ==
- Sir Ghulam Hussain Hidayatullah, 1st Governor of Sindh after independence in 1947, 'Pioneers of Freedom' stamp series (1990)
- Ghulam Bari Aleeg (1907–49), 'Men of Letters' stamp series (1999)

== H ==
- Habib Ibrahim Rahimtoola, Tehreek-e-Pakistan Key Mujahid 'Pioneers of Freedom' stamp series (2002)
- Hakim Abdul Qasim Firdousi; penned "Shahnama" during the 10th century (1994)
- Hakim Muhammad Hassan Qarshi (Hakim; founder of Qarshi Dawakhana) (2002)
- Hakim Mohammad Said, (1920-1998) (physician, writer, scholar) founded Hamdard Dawa Khana, stamp issued on his first death anniversary (1999)
- Hameed Nizami, (Journalist) 'Pioneers of Freedom' stamp series (1991)
- Hassan Ali Effendi (1830 – 1895) (founder of Sindh Madrasatul Islam in 1885) 'Pioneers of Freedom' postage stamp series (1990)
- Heinrich von Stephan (1981)
- Henri Dunant (1978)
- Hugh Catchpole, educationist (2007)
- Hussein Shaheed Suhrawardy Prime Minister of Pakistan, 'Pioneers of Freedom' stamp series (1990)
- King Hussein of Jordan (1971)

== I ==
- Abol Hassan Ispahani 'Pioneers of Freedom' stamp series (1990)
- Ibrahim Ismail Chundrigar, Prime Minister of Pakistan in 1957, 'Pioneers of Freedom' stamp series (2002)
- Imran Khan, Pakistani cricketer (1992)
- Ishtiaq Hussain Qureshi (1903-1981) (educationist/historian), 'Men of Letters' stamp series (2001)
- Ishfaq Ahmed (writer, scholar) 'Men of Letters' stamp series (2013)
- Ibn-e-Insha (poet) 'Men of Letters' stamp series (2013)

== J ==
- Jalaluddin Rumi, 13th-century poet (1997)
- Jam Mir Ghulam Qadir Khan (1994)
- Jamshed Nusserwanjee Mehta, 1st Mayor of Karachi (1988)
- Begum Jahanara Shahnawaz 'Pioneers of Freedom' stamp series (1990)
- Josh Malihabadi (1899-1982), 'Poets of Pakistan' (1999)

== K ==
- Kazi Nazrul Islam, Bengali poet and composer (1968)
- Khawaja Ghulam Farid, Saraiki Sufi poetry, 'Poets of Pakistan' postage stamp series (2001)
- Khawaja Nazimuddin Prime Minister of Pakistan, 'Pioneers of Freedom' stamp series (1990)
- Khwaja Sarwar Hasan (1902–73), 'Men of Letters' stamp series (2005)
- Khushal Khan Khattak, Pashto poet (1995)

== L ==
- Laila Shahzada, painter artist (1926–94), 'Painters of Pakistan' stamp series (2006)
- Liaquat Ali Khan (Prime Minister from 1947 to 1951), 'Pioneers of Freedom' stamps issued in (1974, 1990, 1995, 1997)
- Louis Pasteur (scientist) (1995)
- Lutfullah Khan (1916 – 2012) (Pakistan's eminent music and literature "Archivist")

== M ==
- Malik Barkat Ali (1 April 1886 – 5 April 1946) 'Pioneers of Freedom' postage stamp series (1990)
- Mao Zedong Chinese leader (1999)
- Maria Montessori, educator (1970)
- Maulana Shibli Nomani (1857-1914) 'Pioneers of Freedom' stamp series (1992)
- Maulana Mohammad Ali Jauhar (1878-1931) 'Pioneers of Freedom' stamp series (1978)
- Maulana Shaukat Ali 'Pioneers of Freedom' postage stamp series (1995)
- Maulana Zafar Ali Khan, journalist and scholar, 'Pioneers of Freedom' postage stamp series
- Maulana Abdul Sattar Khan Niazi (1915 - 2001), (Pakistan Movement) 'Tehrik-e-Pakistan Ke Mujjahid' stamp series (2003)
- Maulana Muhammad Ismail Zabeeh (1913 - 2001), (Pakistan Movement) 'Tehrik-e-Pakistan Ke Mujahid' stamp series (2003)
- Maulvi Abdul Haq, Baba-e-Urdu, (20 April 1870-16 August 1961), (writer, linguist) 'Men of Letters' postage stamp series (2004)
- Mihai Eminescu, Romanian poet (2005)
- Mir Ahmad Yar Khan, Khan of Kalat 'Pioneers of Freedom' postage stamp series (1993)
- Mir Jafar Khan Jamali 'Pioneers of Freedom' postage stamp series (2007)
- Mirza Asadullah Khan Mirza Ghalib, 19th-century poet (1969, 1998)
- Mohamedali Habib, philanthropist (2000)
- Mohammad Abdul Latif, also known as 'Pir Sahib Zakori Sharif' 'Pioneers of Freedom' postage stamp series (1993)
- Mohammad Ali Jinnah, Founder of Pakistan, 1st Governor-General, stamps issued (1966, 1972, 1973, 1976, 1989, 1990, 1992, 1994, 1997, 1998, 2001, 2004, 2005, 2006)
- Mohammad Ayub Khan, President of Pakistan (1958-1966)
- Muhammad Ayub Khuhro (1997)
- Lance Naik Muhammad Mahfuz Shaheed (1944–71); Recipient, Nishan-e-Haider Award (2002)
- Shah Mohammad Reza Pahlavi (1967, 1976)
- Major Muhammad Akram Shaheed, Recipient, Nishan-e-Haider Award (2001)
- Muhammad Aly Rangoonwala, philanthropist (2002)
- Captain Muhammad Sarwar Shaheed, Recipient of Nishan-e-Haider Award (2000)
- Musa Pak Shaheed, Muslim saint (2009)
- Mustafa Kemal Atatürk, President of Turkey (1973, 1976, 1981, 2005)
- Muhammad Zia-ul-Haq, President of Pakistan (5 July 1977 – 17 August 1988)
- Muhammad Karam Shah al-Azhari (1918–98), 'Men of Letters' series commemorative postage stamp issued in (2004)

== N ==
- Nawab Bahadur Yar Jung (1905-1944) 'Pioneers of Freedom' stamp series (1990)
- Nawab Sir Shahnawaz Khan Mamdot, 'Pioneer of Freedom' stamp series (1990)
- Nawab Iftikhar Hussain Khan Mamdot, 'Pioneers of Freedom' postage stamp series (1992)
- Nawab Mohammad Ismail Khan 'Pioneers of Freedom' stamp series(1990)
- Nawab Mohsin-ul-Mulk (1837-1907) 'Pioneers of Freedom' stamp series (1994)
- Nawab Salimullah 'Pioneers of Freedom' stamp series (1990)
- Nawab Sadeq Mohammad Khan V, ruler of Bahawalpur State (2004)
- Nawab Viqar-ul-Mulk (1841-1917) 'Pioneers of Freedom' stamp series (1994)
- Noor-us-Sabah (1908–1978) 'Pioneers of Freedom' stamp series (2002)
- Nusrat Fateh Ali Khan (1948–97), Qawwal, Music Maestro, commemorative postage stamp issued in 1999

== P ==
- Patras Bokhari (Syed Ahmad Shah), writer, educationist and UN diplomat 'Men of Letters' postage stamp series (1998)
- Pierre De Coubertin, Founder of Modern Olympics, (1996)
- Pir Ilahi Bux 'Pioneers of Freedom' postage stamp series (1994)
- Pir Mohammad Abdul Latif (Pir Sahib Zakori Sharif) 'Pioneers of Freedom' postage stamps series (1993)
- Pir of Manki Sharif 'Pioneers of Freedom' postage stamp series (1990)
- Pir Meher Ali Shah (1859-1937), Sufi saint series (2013)

== Q ==
- Qazi Muhammad Essa, 'Pioneers of Freedom' postage stamp series (1990)
- Qazi Mureed Ahmed, Pakistan Movement activist (2002)
- Qudrat Ullah Shahab, 'Men of Letters' postage stamp series (2013) - Pakistani civil servant and writer

== R ==
- Begum Ra'ana Liaquat Ali Khan, wife of 1st Prime Minister; founded APWA, stamps issued (1991, 2006)
- Rais Ghulam Muhammad Khan Bhurgri (1990)
- Raja Ghazanfar Ali Khan 'Pioneers of Freedom' postage stamp series (1990)
- Major Raja Aziz Bhatti, Recipient of Nishan-e-Haider Award (1995)
- Raja Sahib Mahmudabad 'Pioneers of Freedom' postage stamp series (1990)
- Rashid Minhas (Shaheed), Recipient of Nishan-e-Haider Award for war service (2003)
- Rehman Baba, poet (2005)

== S ==
- Saadat Hasan Manto(1912–55), "Afsana Nigar" (short story writer), 'Men of Letters' postage stamp series (2005)
- Sadequain, painter artist (1930–87) (2006)
- Salimuzzaman Siddiqui, scientist (1999)
- Salma Tassaduq Hussain (1997)
- Samandar Khan Samandar, poet (2002)
- Sardar Abdur Rab Nishtar 'Pioneers of Freedom' postage stamp series (1990)
- Sardar Aurang Zeb Khan (1899 - 1953) 'Pioneers of Freedom' postage stamp series (1994)
- Sawar Muhammad Hussain Shaheed, (1949–71), Recipient, Nishan-e-Haider Award (2002)
- Shabbir Ahmad Usmani (1887-1949) 'Pioneers of Freedom' stamp series (1990)
- Shabbir Sharif Shaheed, (1943–71) Recipient, Nishan-e-Haider Award (2001)
- Shah Nawaz Bhutto, (1888-1957), father of Zulfiqar Ali Bhutto 'Pioneers of Freedom' stamp series (1994)
- Shakir Ali (1916–75), painter-artist, 'Painters of Pakistan' stamp series (1990, 2006)
- Shaykh Muhammad Karam Shah al-Azhari, postage stamp issued in (2004)
- Khalifa bin Zayed bin Sultan Al-Nahyan, ruler of Abu Dhabi and president of UAE (2001)
- Sher Shah Suri, Emperor of 16th century India (1991)
- Sir Syed Ahmed Khan (1817-1898) 'Pioneers of Freedom' stamp series ((1979, 1990, 1998)
- Syed Sulaiman Nadvi, (historian, scholar) 'Pioneers of Freedom' postage stamp series (1992)
- Syed Ameer Ali, (1849 – 1928) Muslim scholar, 'Pioneers of Freedom' stamp series (1990)
- Syed Imtiaz Ali Taj (1900–70), (playwright, novelist) 'Men of Letters' postage stamp series (2001)
- Sufi Barkat Ali (1911 – 1997) (Sufi and writer) 'Men of Letters' postage stamp series (2013)

== T ==
- Tansu Çiller, Prime Minister of Turkey (1995)
- Tipu Sultan, 18th-century ruler of Mysore, South India 'Pioneers of Freedom' postage stamp series (1979)
- Major Tufail Mohammad Shaheed, recipient of Nishan-e-Haider Award (2000)

== U ==
- Ubaidullah Sindhi (1872-1944) 'Pioneers of Freedom' stamp series (1990)
- Ustad Allah Bakhsh, painter-artist, 'Painters of Pakistan' stamp series (1991)
- Ustad Haji Muhammad Sharif, painter-artist, 'Painters of Pakistan' stamp series (1991)

== Y ==
- Yusuf Khattak (1917 – 29 July 1991) Pakistan Movement 'Key Mujahid' postage stamp series (2003)

== Z ==
- Ziauddin Ahmed 'Pioneers of Freedom' stamp series (1994)
- Zahoor ul Akhlaq, painter artist (1941–99) (2006)
- Zubeida Agha, painter artist (1922–97), 'Painters of Pakistan' stamp series (2006)
- Zulfikar Ali Bhutto, (President, Prime Minister, 1972-1977) (stamps issued in 1989, 1996, 2008)
- Mohammad Zia ul-Haq, (President, 1977-1988)

== Bahawalpur ==
- Abbas Abbasi (1947)
- Mohammad Ali Jinnah (1948)

== See also ==
- Pakistan Postal Services
