= Pride of Performance Awards (1957–1971) =

Pride of Performance (Urdu: تمغۂ حسنِ کارکردگی) is a civil award given by the government of Pakistan to Pakistani citizens in recognition of distinguished merit in the fields of literature, arts, sports, medicine, or science for civilians

== 1957 ==
Name	Field	Specialization	Province	Country
Noor Jehan	Arts	Singing	Punjab	Pakistan
Khwaja Khurshid Anwar	Arts	Music Director	Punjab	Pakistan

== 1958 ==
Name	Field	Specialization	Province	Country
Abdur Rehman Chughtai	Arts	Painting	Punjab	Pakistan
Zainul Abedin	Arts	Painting	East Bengal	East Pakistan (now Bangladesh)
Professor Abdussalam	Science	Physics	Punjab	Pakistan
Hafeez Jalandhri	Literature	Poetry	Punjab	Pakistan
Dr. Shaheedullah	Literature	Linguist	East Bengal	East Pakistan (now Bangladesh)
Kavi Jaseemuddin	Literature	Poetry	East Bengal	East Pakistan (now Bangladesh)
Hashim Khan	Sports	Squash	Khyber Pakhtunkhwa	Pakistan
Subedar Abdul Khaliq Flying Bird of Asia	Sports	Athlete	Punjab	Pakistan
Abdul Hafiz Kardar	Sports	Cricket	Punjab	Pakistan
Fazal Mehmood	Sports	Cricket	Punjab	Pakistan

== 1959 ==
Name	Field	Specialization	Province	Country
Subedar Muhammad Iqbal	Sports	Athlete	Punjab	Pakistan
Hanif Mohammad	Sports	Cricket	Sindh	Pakistan

== 1960 ==
Name	Field	Specialization	Province	Country
Syed Abdus Samad	Sports	Football	East Pakistan	Pakistan (Now Bangladesh)
Major Abdul Hamid (field hockey) Hameedi	Sports	Hockey player and team captain	Punjab	Pakistan
Roshan Khan	Sports	Squash	Khyber Pakhtunkhwa	Pakistan
Brojen Das	Sports	Swimming	East Pakistan	Pakistan (Now Bangladesh)
Khawaja Iftikhar Ahmed	Sports	Tennis	Punjab	Pakistan
Gama Pahlwan	Sports	Wrestling	Punjab	Pakistan
Abdul Alim	Music	Folk Music	East Pakistan	Pakistan (Now Bangladesh)
Roshan Ara Begum	Music	classical music	Punjab	Pakistan
Abbasuddin Ahmed	Music	Folk Music	East Pakistan	Pakistan (Now Bangladesh)
Tassaduq Hussain	Music	Film Music	Punjab, Pakistan	Pakistan
Fateh Ali Khan - Mubarak Ali Khan (Qawwali singers)	Music	Qawwali (Fateh Ali Khan was the father of Nusrat Fateh Ali Khan)	Punjab	Pakistan

== 1961 ==
Name	Field	Specialization	Province	Country
Captain Raja Javed Akhtar Khan	Sports	Mountaineering	Punjab	Pakistan
Azam Khan	Sports	Squash	Khyber Pakhtunkhwa	Pakistan

== 1962 ==
Name	Field	Specialization	Province	Country
Bholu Pahalwan	Sports	Wrestling	Punjab	Pakistan
Naseer Bunda	Sports	Hockey	Punjab	Pakistan
Sadequain	Arts	Painting	Sindh	Pakistan
Sufi Tabassum	Literature	Poetry	Punjab	Pakistan
Ahmed Mohiuddin	Science	Biology and Zoology	Sindh	Pakistan
Hafiz Rashid	Sports	Football	Punjab	Pakistan
Saeed Ahmed	Sports	Cricket	Punjab	Pakistan
M.A.A. Ansari	Farming	Agriculture	Sindh	Pakistan
Mehdi Ali Mirza	Art	Architect	Sindh	Pakistan
Brigadier M.A. Baig	Sports	Polo	Punjab	Pakistan
Major Muhammad Sher Khan	Sports	Mountaineering	Gilgit Baltistan	Pakistan

== 1963 ==
Name	Field	Specialization	Province	Country
Safiuddin Ahmed	Arts	Painting	East Pakistan	[Pakistan](now Bangladesh)]
Ustad Allah Bakhsh	Art	Painting	Punjab	Pakistan
Shahid Ahmad Dehlvi	Literature	Writer	Sindh	Pakistan
Abul Fazal	Literature	Writer	East Pakistan	Pakistan (Now Bangladesh)
Abbas Mirza	Sports	Football	East Pakistan	Pakistan (Now Bangladesh)
Manzoor Hussain Atif	Sports	Hockey captain and player	Punjab	Pakistan
Mushtaq Muhammad	Sports	Cricket	Sindh	Pakistan
Mubarak Shah	Sports	Athlete	Punjab	Pakistan
Captain Yaar Ali Khan	N/A	N/A	N/A	Pakistan
Haji Kaale Khan	Agriculture	Agriculture	Punjab	Pakistan

== 1964 ==
Name	Field	Specialization	Province	Country
Maulana Salahuddin Ahmed	Literature	Writer	Sindh	Pakistan
Khondkar Nasim Ahmed	Sports	Football	East Pakistan	Pakistan (Now Bangladesh)
Jamadar Ghulam Raziq	Sports	Athlete	Punjab	Pakistan

== 1965 ==
Name	Field	Specialization	Province	Country
Noor Jehan	Arts	Singing	Punjab	Pakistan
Naseem Begum	Arts	Singing	Punjab	Pakistan
A.S.M. Qamarul Hasan	Arts	Painting	East Pakistan	Pakistan (Now Bangladesh)
Zubaida Agha	Arts	Painting	Punjab	Pakistan
Ferdausi Begum	Arts	Singer	East Pakistan	Pakistan (Now Bangladesh)
Ustad Muhammad Sharif Khan Poonchwaley	Arts	Music	Punjab	Pakistan
Imtiaz Ali Taj	Arts	Drama	Punjab	Pakistan
Abdul Aziz Memon				Pakistan
Mehboob Alam				Pakistan
S.S.P. Mol Chand	Services	Nursing	Punjab	Pakistan

== 1966 ==
Name	Field	Specialization	Province	Country
Shakir Ali	Arts	Painting	Punjab	Pakistan
Salimuzzaman Siddiqui	Science	Organic chemistry	Sindh	Pakistan
Raees Ahmad Jaffri	Literature	Writer	Sindh	Pakistan
Khwaja Moinuddin	Arts	Drama	Sindh	Pakistan
Muhammad Inamulhaq				Pakistan
Abdul Wahab Khan				Pakistan
M.M. Sarwar	Science|		Pakistan	
K.M. Mansoor				Pakistan
Ustad Ayat Ali Khan	Arts	Music	East Pakistan	Pakistan (Now Bangladesh)
Muhammad Nawaz	Sports	Athlete	Punjab	Pakistan
Imtiaz Ahmad	Sports	Cricket	Punjab	Pakistan
Sheikh Shaheb Ali	Sports	Football	East Pakistan	Pakistan (Now Bangladesh)

== 1967 ==
Name	Field	Specialization	Province	Country
Haji Muhammad Sharif	Arts	Painting	Punjab	Pakistan
Ustad Munshi Raziuddin	Arts	Qawwali Music	Punjab	Pakistan
Rafi Peer	Arts	Drama	Punjab	Pakistan
Ashiq Husain Batalvi	Literature	Writer	Punjab	Pakistan
Kavi Bande Ali Mian	Literature	Poet	East Pakistan	Pakistan (Now Bangladesh)
Aslam Pahalwan	Sports	Wrestling	Punjab	Pakistan
Mrs N.F. Halim	Science	Medicine	Sindh	Pakistan

== 1968 ==
Name	Field	Specialization	Province	Country
Ahmad Nadeem Qasmi	Literature	Poetry	Punjab	Pakistan
Shaukat Usman				Pakistan
Ali Imam	Arts	Painting	Punjab	Pakistan
Asif Iqbal	Sports	Cricket	Sindh	Pakistan
Muhammad Bashir	Sports	Wrestling	Punjab	Pakistan
Khalid Mahmood Hussain	Sports	Hockey	Punjab	Pakistan
Tariq Aziz	Sports	Hockey	Punjab	Pakistan

== 1969 ==
Name	Field	Specialization	Province	Country
Ustad Amanat Ali Khan	Arts	Music	Punjab	Pakistan
Bade Fateh Ali Khan	Arts	Music	Punjab	Pakistan
Anna Molka Ahmed	Arts	Painting	Punjab	Pakistan
Laila Arjumand Banu	Arts	Music	East Pakistan	Pakistan (Now Bangladesh)
Ustad Umeed Ali Khan	Arts	Music	Punjab	Pakistan
Mohammad Kibria	Arts	Painting	East Pakistan	Pakistan (Now Bangladesh)
Muhammad Asad Malik	Sports	Hockey	Punjab	Pakistan
Saeed Anwar	Sports	Hockey	Punjab	Pakistan
Moideen Kutty	Sports	Football	Punjab	Pakistan
Mohammad Akhtar	Sports	Wrestling	Punjab	Pakistan
Zehra Khatoon	Services	Nursing		Pakistan

== 1970 ==
Name	Field	Specialization	Province	Country
Sheikh Mohammed Ismail Panipati	Literature	Writer		Pakistan
Ismail Gulgee	Arts	Painting	Sindh	Pakistan
Farida Khanum	Arts	Singing	Punjab	Pakistan
Muslehuddin	Art	Music	Punjab	Pakistan
Naheed Niazi	Arts	Singing	Punjab	Pakistan
Abdul Rasheed Junior	Sports	Hockey	Punjab	Pakistan
Ahmed Riazuddin	Sports	Hockey	Punjab	Pakistan
Jahangir Butt	Sports	Hockey	Punjab	Pakistan
Chaudhry Ghulam Rasool	Sports	Hockey	Punjab	Pakistan
Faiz Muhammad	Sports	Wrestling	Punjab	Pakistan
Major Mohammad Aslam Khan	Sports	Wrestling	Punjab	Pakistan

== 1971 ==
Name	Field	Specialization	Province	Country
Rasheed Chaudhry				Pakistan
Ustad Gul Mohammad Khan	Arts	Music	East Bengal	East Pakistan (now Bangladesh)
S. M. Ikram	Literature	Writing	Punjab	Pakistan
Sufi Mutahir Hussain	Literature	Writing	East Bengal	East Pakistan (now Bangladesh)
Dr. Mehboob Ali	Science			Pakistan
Fazal Rehman	Sports	Hockey	Punjab	Pakistan
Tanvir Dar	Sports	Hockey	Punjab	Pakistan
Riaz Ahmed	Sports	Hockey	Punjab	Pakistan
Nabi Ahmed Kalat	Sports	Hockey	Punjab	Pakistan
Zaheer Abbas	Sports	Cricket	Sindh	Pakistan
Irshad Begum Chaudhry	Services	Nursing	Punjab	Pakistan
