= Ahmed Saeed Nagi =

Pakistani painter

- Born: 2 February 1916; Amritsar, Punjab, British India
- Died: 1 September 2006 (aged 90); Karachi, Pakistan
- Occupation: Painter artist
- Known for: being the 'official artist' of the Pakistan freedom movement
- Awards: Pride of Performance Award in 1990

Ahmed Saeed Nagi (Urdu: احمد سعید ناگی) (2 February 1916 – 1 September 2006) was a noted Pakistani painter-artist. He was known as the 'official artist' of the Pakistan freedom movement.

Having a portrait made by Nagi became a hallmark of prestige for top politicians since Nagi made the first portrait of Quaid-e-Azam Muhammad Ali Jinnah, (the founder of Pakistan). A person who believed in universality, he was known for his friendship with the late Zulfiqar Ali Bhutto, which was partly the reason he never painted a portrait of Zia-ul-Haq.

== Early life and career ==
Ahmed Saeed Nagi received his education in Amritsar, Lahore, Delhi and Paris. He was a Pakistan Movement activist from 1944 to 1947. Pakistani leaders Jinnah and Liaquat Ali Khan used to give him assignments that he would complete for them in Lahore and other Pakistani cities. He performed art work at the Governor House Karachi, Governor House, Lahore, the historically significant Mohatta Palace building in Karachi. He also performed art work at the Ziarat Residency of Jinnah in Balochistan, Governor House in Peshawar and at the Punjab Assembly building in Lahore.

== Exhibits ==
Ahmed Saeed Nagi held exhibits of his paintings in Paris, London, Zagreb, New York, Delhi, Simla, Lahore and Karachi.

== Death and survivors ==
Ahmed Saeed Nagi died on 1 September 2006 at the Agha Khan Hospital in Karachi. He was 90. He is survived by three sons and a daughter.

== Awards and recognition ==
- His two stalls— Export Pavilion & Tourist Bureau – received Gold Medal Awards for them
- His name was included in the Encyclopedia of World Art
- In recognition of his outstanding achievements as a painter artist, he was honored with the Pride of Performance Award by the Government of Pakistan in 1990
- A book written by Safi Safdar on Ahmed Saeed Nagi's art, titled Ahmed Saeed Nagi and his art: an artist with a national vision

== See also ==
- Abdur Rahman Chughtai
- Sadequain
- Shakir Ali
- Ali Imam
- Anna Molka Ahmed
- Laila Shahzada
- Zubeida Agha
- Ismail Gulgee
