= Pakistani art =

Pakistani art (Urdu: پاکستانی فن) has a long tradition and history. It consists of a variety of art forms, including painting, sculpture, calligraphy, pottery, and textile arts such as woven silk. In pre-Independence periods historians generally take it together with the wider Indian art of the Indian subcontinent, and it also shares traditions with the wider styles of Islamic art, especially Persian art.

== History ==
=== Painting ===
After independence in 1947, there were only two major art schools in Pakistan - the Mayo School of Art and the Department of Fine Arts at the Punjab University. Early pioneers of Pakistani art include Abdur Rahman Chughtai who painted with Mughal and Islamic styles, and Ahmed Parvez who was among the early modernists of Pakistan.

A prominent figure in Pakistani visual arts was the Karachi-based watercolourist Qudsia Azmat Nisar, who died in 2021. Over a career spanning nearly five decades, she educated and mentored thousands of students and emerging artists across the country.

=== Calligraphy ===
In the 1960s and 1970s, calligraphic styles emerged in Pakistan, with notable artists being Iqbal Geoffrey and Sadequain. The Karachi School of Art, the first art institution in Karachi, was founded in 1964 by Rabia Zuberi.

In 2017, in an effort to promote and preserve the art of calligraphy, the National Language Promotion Department (NLPD), under the patronage of the National History and Literary Heritage (NH&LH) Division, has established the first dedicated Calligraphy Wing within its premises. Additionally, the NH&LH Division had compiled a directory of 320 Pakistani calligraphers, documenting their profiles and contributions.

=== Graffiti ===
In the 21st century, graffiti started becoming popular in Pakistan, with the emergence of artists such as Sanki King, and Asim Butt. The latter also spearheaded Stuckism in Pakistan.

== Art museums and galleries ==
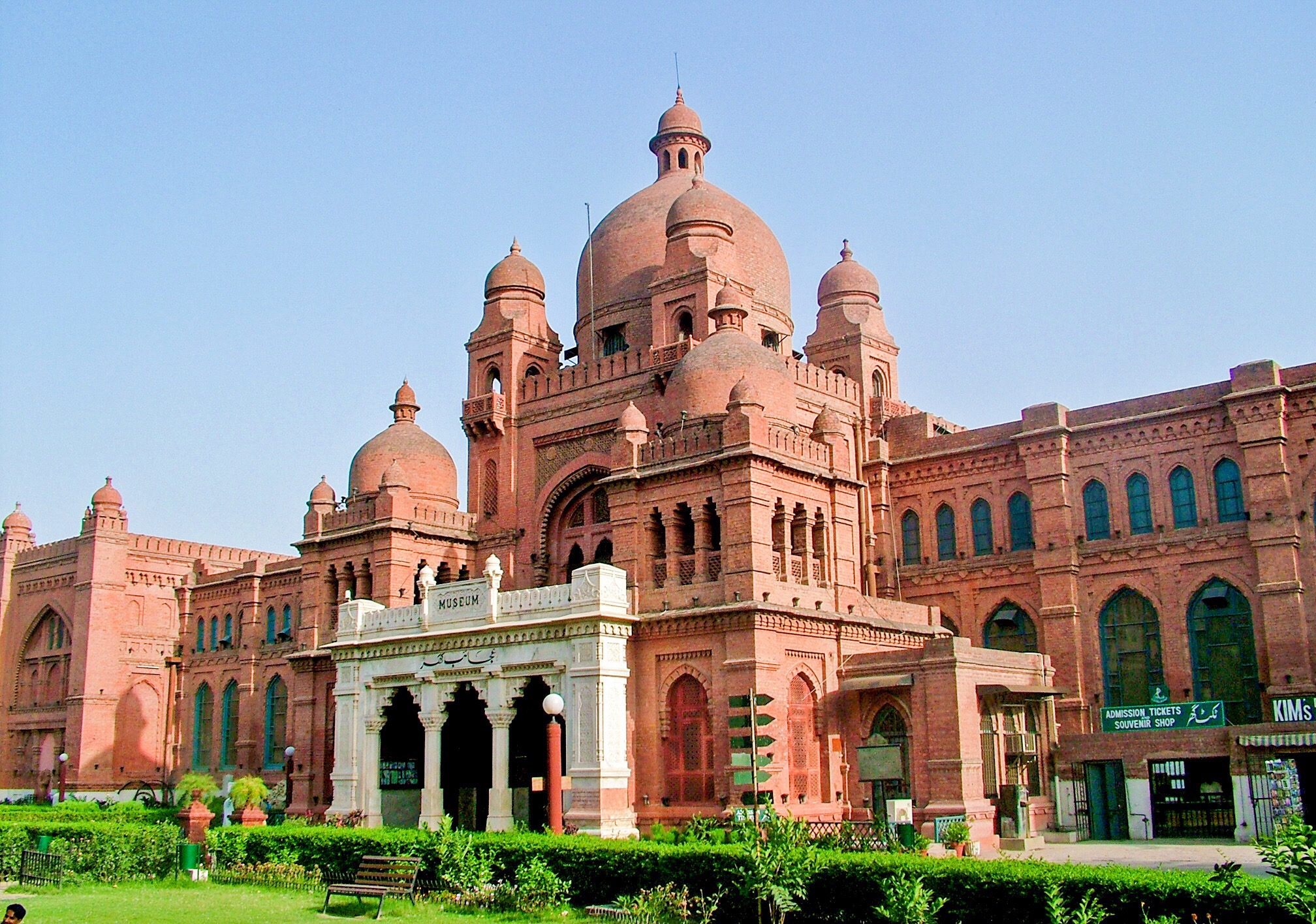
Lahore Museum, Lahore

Major art galleries in Pakistan include the National Art Gallery in Islamabad. The Lahore Museum is known for its extensive collection of Buddhist art from the ancient Indo-Greek and Gandhara kingdoms, as well as from the Mughal, Sikh, and British empires.

== Famous artists ==
Here is a list of some of Pakistan's famous artists:

- Abdur Rahman Chughtai
- Sadequain
- Ahmed Parvez
- Ismail Gulgee
- Zahoor ul Akhlaq
- Jamil Naqsh
- Saira Wasim
- Shahzia Sikander
- Imran Qureshi
- Rashid Rana
- Hamra Abbas
- Warda Shabir
- Salima Hashmi
- Shakir Ali

== See also ==
- List of Pakistani artists
- Pakistani painters
- Art museums and galleries in Pakistan
- Truck art in South Asia
- Pakistani comics
- Indian art
- Asian art
