= Askari Mian Irani =

Pakistani painter (1940–2004)

Askari Mian Irani (1940–2004) was a Pakistani painter.

== Early life and education ==
In 1967, Askari Mian Irani received a diploma in Commercial Design from the Mayo School of Arts. now called National College of Arts (NCA), Lahore.

== Career ==
He worked in the advertising industry until 1976. Later he became disillusioned with the nature of his job and decided to return to his first passion - painting. Irani was part of the NCA faculty from 1976 to 1999.

=== Painting exhibits ===
He exhibited in over 20 solo and group shows.

=== Stamp design ===
Irani designed two stamps (40 paisas and 85 paisas) of the Third Organisation of the Islamic Conference (OIC) (1981) issue.

== Commemorative postage stamp ==
On 14 August 2006, Pakistan Post issued a Rs. 40 sheetlet of stamps to posthumously honour 10 Pakistani painters. Besides Askari Mian Irani, the other nine painters were: Laila Shahzada, Zubeida Agha, Sadequain, Ali Imam, Shakir Ali, Anna Molka Ahmed, Zahoor ul Akhlaq, Ahmed Pervez and Bashir Mirza.

== Awards and recognition ==
- Pride of Performance Award by the President of Pakistan (2002)
