= Ahmed Parvez =

Pakistani Painter

- Born: 1926; Rawalpindi, Pakistan
- Died: 1979 (aged 52–53); Karachi, Pakistan
- Occupation: Painter Artist
- Writing career
- Notable awards: President's Pride of Performance Award; 1978

Ahmed Parvez (Urdu: احمد پرویز) (1926 – 1979) was a modernist painter from Rawalpindi, Pakistan. He was a member of The Lahore Group in Pakistan and the founder of the Pakistan Group in London. He was also among the few early modernists of Pakistani origin to have garnered considerable critical acclaim, with solo exhibitions at the New Vision, Lincoln, and Clement Stephens galleries in London, along with exhibitions at London's Commonwealth Institute and the Ashmolean Museum in Oxford between 1955 and 1964.

== Life as an artist ==
In 1962, Parvez held a two-man exhibition at the Lincoln Gallery with American painter Alexander Calder. Ali Imam wrote in 1979 that "Ahmed Parvez has held over 30 solo exhibitions in Europe, the US and Pakistan. He is undoubtedly our most exhibited Pakistani painter abroad."

Declaring his paintings to be "art of the highest standard", George Butcher wrote for The Guardian in 1963 that his abstract painting Three in One (II) was "as complete and beautiful a testament to the resolution of the Eastern pattern and Western Tachism as has been accomplished by anyone. The mood is as near to [Paul] Klee as it is to the jeweled ambiance of an Eastern potentate."

The Oxford Mail review of Parvez's work noted that "it takes an extremely clear vision or strong personality to impose such an individual character on an abstract or near abstract design. Ben Nicholson, Ivon Hitchens, Jackson Pollock and R. J. Hitchcock are among the few that have it; so is Ahmed Parvez."

In the 1950s, Victor Musgrave, a British poet, art dealer and curator of Gallery One, considered Parvez to be "without question, the outstanding artist from Pakistan who has made a very strong impact upon the English art world. His extension into the West of the ideals implicit in Muslim art has been an effort of unique importance." Ahmed Parvez attempted to integrate Modernism into Pakistani art.

== Life in the UK and US ==
From 1955 to 1964, Ahmed lived and worked in London, UK. In the late 1960s, he spent two years living and working in the United States before returning to Pakistan. During this time, he exhibited his work at the Galerie Internationale in New York City and married Reiko Isago, from Sendai, Japan. She would later give birth to their son, Aleem Isago Parvez.

== Death ==
In 1979, Ahmed Parvez was found unconscious in a Karachi hotel following a massive brain hemorrhage. He died in a hospital soon after.

== Awards ==
- Pride of Performance Award (Urdu: تمغۂ حسنِ کارکردگی) by the Government of Pakistan in 1978.

== Commemorative postage stamp ==
On 14 August 2006, Pakistan Post Office issued a Rs. 40 sheetlet of stamps to posthumously honour 10 Pakistani painters. Besides Ahmed Parvez, the other nine painters honoured were: Laila Shahzada, Askari Mian Irani, Sadequain, Ali Imam, Shakir Ali, Anna Molka Ahmed, Zahoor ul Akhlaq, Zubeida Agha and Bashir Mirza.

== Major exhibits ==
Ahmed Parvez held over 30 solo exhibitions in Europe, US and Pakistan

- Ashmolean Museum, Oxford, UK
- Commonwealth Institute, London, UK
- Lincoln Gallery (1962)
- The Ahmed Parvez Retrospective at VM Gallery, Karachi (2004)
