= Bashir Mirza =

Pakistani artist and painter

Bashir Mirza (BM)
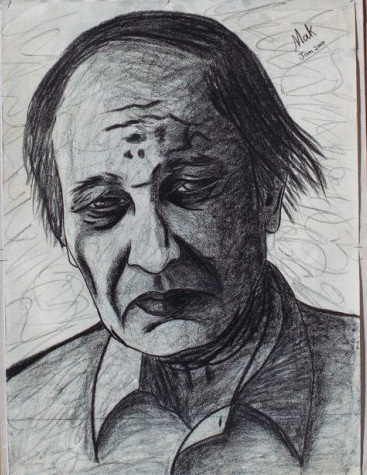
- Portrait of Bashir Mirza by Muhammad Arshad Khan, also known as "MAK"
- Born: 1941; Amritsar, British India
- Died: 19 January 2000; Karachi, Pakistan
- Occupations: Painter, artist
- Years active: 1965 – 1999
- Awards: Pride of Performance Award (1994)

Bashir Mirza (1941 – 19 January 2000), also known as BM, was a Pakistani painter and artist.

== Early life and education ==
Born in Amritsar, British India in 1941, Mirza joined the Mayo School of Arts (now National College of Arts (NCA), Lahore, where he was one of Shakir Ali's favorite students of art. Shakir Ali was the principal at the NCA at the time. Bashir graduated in 1962 from the department of design and was amongst the first batch of graduates of the renamed school.

== Career ==
He never stayed for long with one theme or style, fluctuating between realistic, abstract and non-objective styles. Mirza looked out for new ventures of earning a living. He opened up an art gallery (the first ever in Karachi) at Kutchery Road in 1965 but in 1969 left town to go abroad. He also published an art journal called Artistic Pakistan but in 1968 sold it off. Marjorie Husain, an art critic and writer of Bashir Mirza's biography, 'The Last of the Bohemians- Bashir Mirza' (2006) called the artist "innovative and brilliant who emerged as one of the best among his generation of the painters of the 1960s." According to her, Bashir was outspoken, fearless but had great respect for the talent of his peers.

He exhibited his controversial "Lonely Girl" painting series in 1971.

The "Lonely Girl" painting series was shown and gifted to the Seoul Olympic Art Museum when he was invited by the Seoul Olympic Committee. His exhibition "DAWN OF DEMOCRACY" was inaugurated by Begum Nusrat Bhutto and sporadic highs and lows followed in his career. In 1994, Mirza departed for Australia as Pakistan's cultural attaché. But he soon got tired of the diplomatic life and returned to Pakistan in 1996. By then he was also sick. On his return, he opened up an art gallery and an advertising agency in Karachi. There were subsequent lukewarm exhibitions, the latest being at Chawkandi in August 1999 just months before his death on 19 January 2000.

== Stamp design ==
Mirza designed two stamps of the 1963 stamp series "Freedom from Hunger" for the Pakistan Postal Services.

== Postage stamp ==
On 14 August 2006, Pakistan Post office issued a Rs. 40 sheetlet of stamps to posthumously honour 10 Pakistani Painters. Besides Bashir Mirza, the other 9 painters are: Laila Shahzada, Zubeida Agha, Sadequain, Ali Imam (painter artist), Shakir Ali, Anna Molka Ahmed, Zahoor ul Akhlaq, Ahmed Pervez and Askari Mian Irani.

== Awards ==
- Pride of Performance (1994) by the President of Pakistan
