= Khondkar Nasim Ahmed =

Bangladeshi footballer (1912–unknown)

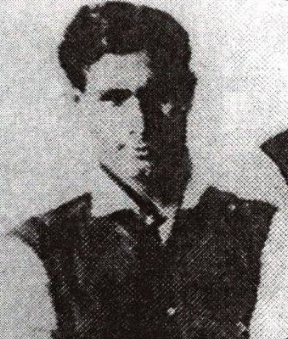
- Nasim with Kolkata Mohammedan

Personal information
- Full name: Khondkar Nasim Ahmed
- Date of birth: 1 September 1912
- Place of birth: Comilla, British India
- Date of death: Unknown
- Place of death: Bangladesh
- Positions: Right-half; center-half

Senior career*
Years	Team	Apps	(Gls)
1926–1927	Victoria SC		
1927	Muslim SC		
1928–1932	Calcutta Sporting Union		
1932–1934	Aryan FC		
1935	East Bengal		
1936–1940	Kolkata Mohammedan		
1940–1942	Aryan FC		

International career
1933–1934	India XI		
- * Club domestic league appearances and goals

Khondkar Nasim Ahmed (Bengali: খোন্দকার নাসিম আহমেদ; 12 September 1912 – unknown) also alternatively spelled as Khundkar Nasim Ahmad, was a Bangladeshi footballer who played club football in both the Dhaka Football League and Calcutta Football League. Prior to the partition of India, he represented the Indian XI team and was also included in the squad that toured South Africa in 1934.

== Early life ==
Nasim was born in Daudkandi Upazila of Comilla District, British India.

== Club career ==
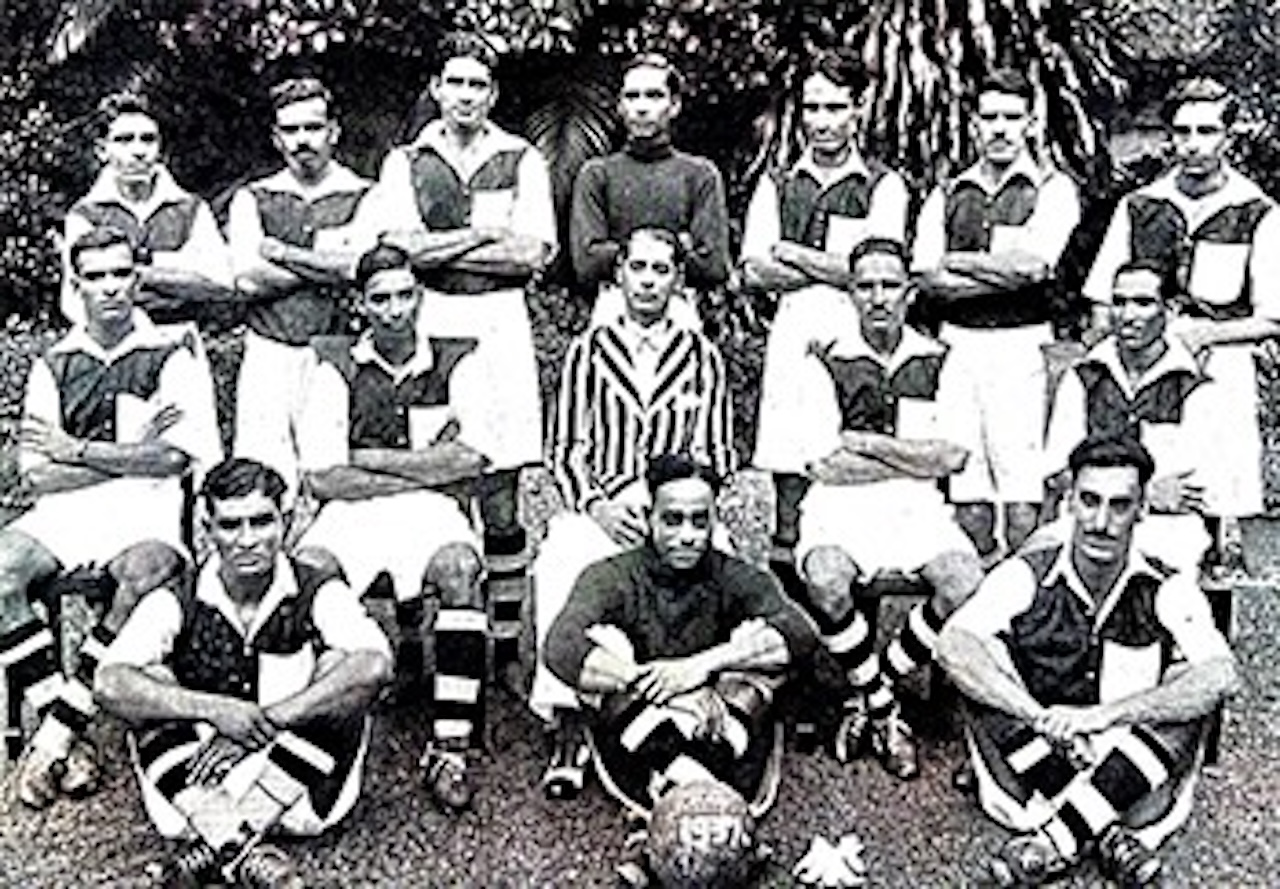
Nasim (third from left, standing row) with Mohammedan Sporting in 1937.

Nasim first played for Victoria Sporting Club in 1926. In 1927, he participated in the IFA Shield in Calcutta with Victoria. In the same year, he featured for the newly-formed Muslim Sporting Club in the Ronaldshay Shield in Dhaka. In 1928, he represented the Dacca XI against Dalhousie AC in an exhibition match. He would also play for Calcutta Sporting Union, as well as Kolkata Mohammedan, where he won the 1940 Rovers Cup with the team. The same year, Nasim would go on to join Aryan FC playing for them up until 1947. He also helped the team win the 1940 IFA Shield. On 25 November 1937, Nasim represented Tipperah XI in an exhibition match against the visiting Islington Corinthians in his home district of Comilla. The game ended in a 3–0 defeat for the home side, with Nasim playing as center-half. Notably, the Tipperah XI included several players from the Calcutta Football League, all hailing from the district.

== International career ==
Nasim represented India as a right half in Indian-European matches. In 1933, he was selected for India's tour to Ceylon, making an appearance against Ceylon. The following year, he was a part of the Indian team that toured South Africa.

== Post-playing career ==
Nasim was associated with the East Pakistan Sports Federation (EPSF) and played a significant role in the provincial team selection ahead of the 1957 National Football Championship in Dhaka.

In 1964, he was awarded the Pride of Performance for his contributions to the game of football.

In 1976, he was awarded the National Sports Awards by the Government of Bangladesh.

== Honours ==
Mohammedan Sporting

- Rovers Cup:
  - Winners (1): 1940

Aryan

- IFA Shield:
  - Winners (1): 1940

=== Individual ===
- 1964 − Pride of Performance Awards.
- 1976 − National Sports Awards.
