= Anna Molka Ahmed =

Pakistani painter artist (1917–1994)

- Born: Molly Bridger; 13 August 1917; London, England
- Died: 20 April 1994 (aged 76); Lahore, Pakistan
- Known for: Painting, educator
- Spouse: Sheikh Ahmed (m. 1939; div. 1951)
- Awards: Tamgha-e-Imtiaz (Medal of Excellence) by the Government of Pakistan in 1963; Pride of Performance Award by the President of Pakistan in 1969

Anna Molka Ahmed (13 August 1917 – 20 April 1994) was a Pakistani artist and a pioneer of fine arts education in the country after its independence in 1947. She was a professor of fine arts at the University of the Punjab in Lahore.

== Early life and career ==
Anna Molka Ahmed was born Molly Bridger to Jewish parents, in London, England on 13 August 1917. Her mother was Polish and father was Russian. She converted to Islam at the age of 18 in 1935, before marrying Sheikh Ahmed in October 1939, who was then studying in London. She studied painting, sculpture and design at St. Martin School of Arts in London, and received a scholarship to the Royal Academy of Art.

Ahmed moved to Lahore in 1940 and, besides painting, taught fine art at the University of the Punjab. Professor Emeritus Anna Molka Ahmed set up the Department of Fine Arts now called the College of Arts and Design at the University of the Punjab, which she headed until 1978.

In 1951, the couple parted ways but Anna chose to remain in Pakistan with her two daughters until her death on 20 April 1994.

In her 55-year career, "she was well known as a painter of evocative landscapes, grand thematic figurative compositions and observant, insightful portraits. Her works are characterized by a signature impasto technique executed in a flamboyant, vivid palette."

== Awards and honours ==
She was awarded the Tamgha-i-Imtiaz (Medal of Excellence) by the Government of Pakistan in 1963, for her services in the field of fine arts education.

- Pride of Performance Award in 1969 by the President of Pakistan.
- Khudeja Tul Kubra Medal

On 14 August 2006, Pakistan Post issued a Rs. 40 sheetlet of stamps to posthumously honour ten Pakistani painters. Besides Anna Molka Ahmed, the other nine painters were: Laila Shahzada, Askari Mian Irani, Sadequain, Ali Imam, Shakir Ali, Zahoor ul Akhlaq, Zubeida Agha, Ahmed Pervez and Bashir Mirza.

== Google Doodle for her ==
On 1 June 2020, Google celebrated her with a Google Doodle.
