= Noor-us-Sabah =

Pakistani poet, writer, and Pakistan Movement activist (1908–1978)

- نورالصباح بیگم
- Born: 1908; Rampur, United Provinces, British India
- Died: 1978 (aged 69–70)
- Occupations: Writer, poet, and political activist
- Spouse: Muhammad Zaheeruddin Khan
- Writing career
- Language: Urdu
- Notable work: Tehrik-e-Pakistan aur Khawatin
- Movement: Pakistan Movement

Noor-us-Sabah (Urdu: نورالصباح بیگم; 1908–1978) was a Pakistani writer, poet, and Pakistan Movement activist.

== Early life ==
Noor-us-Sabah was born in 1908 into a Yusufzai Pathan family from a small town in Rampur, in the then United Provinces of northern India. She married Muhammad Zaheeruddin Khan, a member of the Khilafat movement from the Sherpur family.

She entered politics to support the All-India Muslim League's campaign for Pakistan and was among the Muslim women who took part in political mobilisation despite restrictions on women's participation in public life. After independence, she founded the women's organisation Bazm-e-Amal Khawateen in November 1947.

== Literary career ==
Noor-us-Sabah began her literary career in 1924, when her first article appeared in the Lahore-based periodical Urdu. Her work was later published in Masiha and, after the Partition of India, in publications including Rozgar, Mah-e-Nau, Imroze, Anjam, Akhbar-e-Jahan, and Daily Jang.

She wrote poetry, essays, and novels, and gave talks on Radio Pakistan. Her novels included Gurezan, Gardish-e-Dauran, and Yadon Ke Chiragh. Her poetry collection Subh-e-Ghazal (1964) featured poems and ghazals about the Pakistan Movement and the role of Muslim women.

Her best-known work, Tehrik-e-Pakistan aur Khawatin, was published in 1970. It documents the political, social, and literary contributions of women involved in the Pakistan Movement and includes accounts of her own experiences as an activist. She also wrote Pakistan Ki Mashhoor Shakhsiyatein: Meri Nazar Mein, a collection of biographical sketches.

== Legacy ==
In 2002, Pakistan Post issued a commemorative postage stamp featuring Noor-us-Sabah as part of a series honouring activists of the Pakistan Movement.
