= Zubeida Agha =

Modern Pakistani artist

- Born: 1922; Lyallpur (present-day Faisalabad), Pakistan
- Died: 31 October 1997; Islamabad, Pakistan
- Education: Kinnaird College for Women University, Lahore, Pakistan Saint Martin's School of Art, London, UK École des Beaux-Arts, Paris, France
- Occupation: Painter Artist
- Years active: 1946–1996
- Known for: Modernist Painting; Director of Contemporary Art Gallery, Rawalpindi (1961–1977)
- Awards: Pride of Performance Award in 1965 by the President of Pakistan

Zubeida Agha (Urdu: زبیدہ آغا; 1922–1997) was among the first Pakistani Modern Artists. After the creation of Pakistan in 1947, she was the first artist to hold an exhibition of her paintings. She helped bring the modern idiom to Pakistan.

== Early life ==
Zubeida Agha was born in 1922 in Faisalabad, Punjab, Pakistan. After graduating from Kinnaird College for Women University, Lahore, she worked with painter B. C. Sanyal from 1944 to 1946. At this time, she also became well-acquainted with the works of Picasso. She was also influenced by the works of Mario Perlingeri, an Italian prisoner of war in India at that time. The Society of Fine Arts awarded her first prize for modern painting in 1946. She joined Saint Martin's School of Art, London in 1950, later moving on to Ecole des Beaux Arts, Paris in 1951. In 1961, she was appointed executive director of the Contemporary Art Gallery in Rawalpindi, Pakistan, receiving the President's Pride of Performance award in 1965.

== Career ==
Zubeida Agha is considered a premier painter of Pakistan and a pioneer of modern art in the country. In the 1940s, she had the courage and determination to launch a modern style of painting. Her style of art first baffled and later overwhelmed art critics and viewers. Colourist painting is characterized by the use of intense colour. Zubeida Agha was one of the great colourist painters in the history of Pakistani painting. She uses colour not only for itself, but to lend truthfulness and depth of meaning to her images, using her imagination to provoke the viewer into thought. In November 2002, a large exhibit of Zubeida Agha's paintings was held at Shakir Ali Museum, Lahore.

== Postage stamp ==
On 14 August 2006, Pakistan Post issued a Rs. 40 sheetlet of stamps to posthumously honour 10 Pakistani painters. Besides Zubeida Agha, the other nine painters were: Laila Shahzada, Askari Mian Irani, Sadequain, Ali Imam, Shakir Ali, Anna Molka Ahmed, Zahoor ul Akhlaq, Ahmed Pervez and Bashir Mirza.

== Legacy ==
Zubeida Agha is often called a torch-bearer of modern art in Pakistan. Other times she is also named 'The grande dame of Pakistani art'.

Her work is on permanent display at the National Art Gallery of Pakistan National Council of the Arts in Islamabad, Pakistan. National Art Gallery is displaying some works of Pakistani legends of visual art on permanent basis to serve as inspiration and to educate the coming generations.
