= Muhammad Arshad Khan =

Pakistani artists

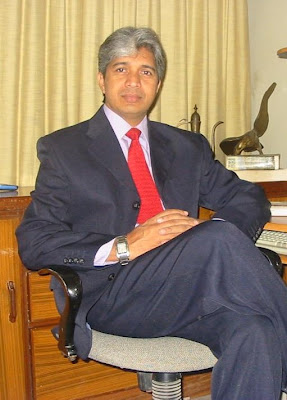
- Born: October 14, 1969 (age 56); Pontia, Topi, Khyber Pakhtunkhwa, Pakistan
- Occupations: Painter and social worker

Muhammad Arshad Khan (Urdu: : محمد ارشد خان, born 14 October 1969), known as MAK, is a Pakistani artist, painter, sculptor, social worker and the president of the Pakistan national committee for the World Art Games. Although he did not go to any art college, he has learned painting from Bashir Mirza and has done yseveral paintings. His style of painting is identified by some as Mak Art.

== Early life and education ==
Arshad is the son of Muhammad Azam Khan, born in Pontia, Tehsil Topi, District Swabi, Khyber Pukhtunkhwa on 14 October 1969. His official birthdate is 16 February 1972. He spent a few early years in Karachi, then his family shifted to Topi where he grew up in Mohallah Serai (a labour colony of Pukhtoon Society).

He studied at Government Primary School Shaheedan Topi, Government High School Topi, from which he obtained his secondary school certificate in 1988. After qualifying intermediate examination from Peshawar Board, he studied sociology as a major subject, along with mass communication, community development and urban sociology as specialized subjects in Bachelor of Arts (Honors) in Karachi University. In 1996, he earned a Master of Arts degree. He did a research thesis titled "Study of The Factors Effecting Maternal and Infant Health in Low Income Groups of Urban" to qualify for his master's degree. Presently, he resides in New Muzzafar Abad Colony, Landhi Industrial Area, Karachi.

== Career as artist ==
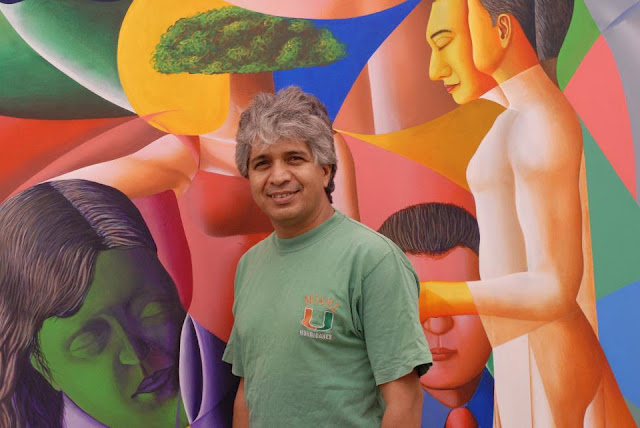
Mak in front of painting The Shadow

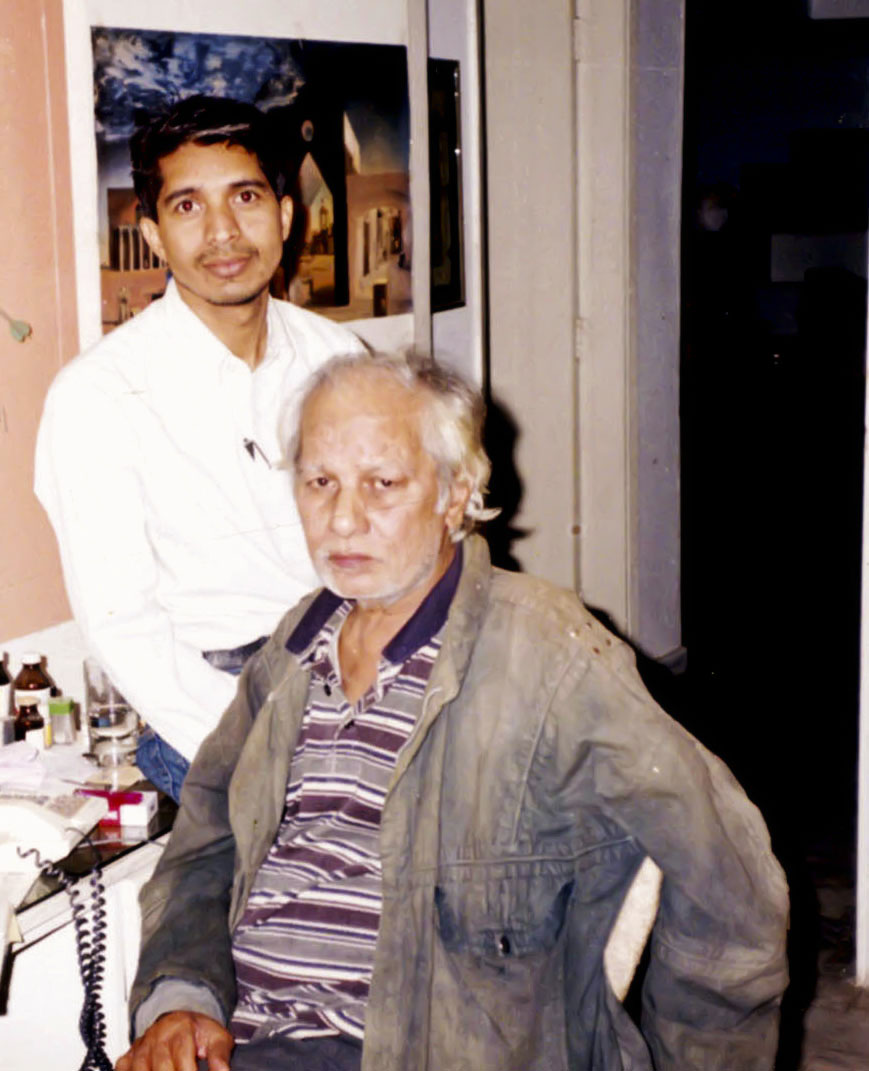
Mak with Bashir Mirza, his art teacher

He was better in drawings among his schoolmates but he couldn't attend art school to learn drawing. Khalid Zaman brought him to Karachi. There, he was involved in arts/theater as an actor, under the guidance of Ahmed Farooqui, an actor qualified at Poonum Arts School.

Soon after graduating from Karachi University, he took an appointment in TCS. He got an opportunity to become a student of presidential Performance Award winner, painter and ex-Cultural Attaché for Australia Bashir Mirza. Mirza started teaching him drawings and paintings from September 1997 until his death on 5 January 2000. He had also taken some classes from Nayyer Jameel.

He was introduced to the "Sunday gathering" at Indus Gallery by Bashir Mirza in 1997, where regular members Ali Imam, Bashir Mirza, Saleem Asmi, Professor Dr. Haroon, M. M. Usmani, Suleman Ganchi, Iqbal Jaffery, Aftab Tapal, Tasaduq Sohail and other national, as well as international, artists and celebrities interacted about art.

Besides this, Mak uses his art to give tributes to his ideals. He accompanied with his other mates take part in exhibitions at Karachi and in other cities.

== Community service ==
=== Ranrraa Development Trust ===
"Ranrraa", established in 2006, is basically a Pashto word which has multiple meanings such as light, sacred conception and bright vision. He associated with the trust to help students affected by terrorism. "The mission of trust is to boost up the morale and life standard of the students directly affected by terrorism in Swat and Waziristan and... restart the life circle."

RDT always tried to create awareness among people about the issues, and gave opportunities to students so they could study in a calm atmosphere and look forward to their promising future. Besides this, RDT also executed campaigns in order to create awareness.

==== Anti-toy gun campaign ====
Toy guns are seen in the streets of Karachi. Mak raised his voice through RDT against toy guns as they train children for violence. In festivals, the sale of these guns increase. They are frequently used as a toy by the children of Karachi. RDT lifted up the banners at Press Club to stop toy guns and to save children. In an interview, Mak told the BBC, "If you are buying the gun, you are training five-year-olds to put a bullet in the chamber and fire shots. After using the toy gun, a child can easily use a real one."

=== Pukhtoon Thinkers Forum ===
Muhammad Arshad Khan is a founder member of the Cultural and Literary Secretary of Pukhtoon Thinkers Forum, which was established on 16 November 2007. It is a non-profit organization established to promote philosophy of non-violence, especially the version practiced by Khan Abdul Ghaffar Khan, Pakhto to Pakhto, literature, culture and arts. Pukhtoon thinkers forum worked for the literature of Pashto and provided books to the corner. The Forum also translated books and organized several events. PTF paid tributes to the great poets with the help of seminars and organizing events. In an interview with the Express Tribune, Mak said, "We wish for such events to act as a bridge between our culture and that of others".
