= Zahoor ul Akhlaq =

Painter artist of Pakistan (1941-1999)

Zahoor ul Akhlaq (4 February 1941 – 18 January 1999) was a Pakistani artist who taught at the NCA (National College of Arts) in Lahore.

== Background and family life ==
Born in Delhi, British India in 1941, he was the eldest in a family of 11 children. His family moved to Lahore after the independence of Pakistan in 1947, eventually settling in Karachi. Akhlaq attended the Sindh Madrassah (now called Sindh Madressatul Islam University) as a young boy and in 1958 went to study art in Lahore at the Mayo School of Arts (now called National College of Arts).

Pakistani painter Shakir Ali was teaching art there as a professor at the time. Shakir Ali encouraged him greatly in his art studies. Zahoor graduated from this college in 1962 and he then started teaching at the same college in the Fine Arts Department. Shakir Ali heavily influenced him to learn the Cubist style and other modern ideas of that time.

In 1971, he married Sheherezade Alam, a potter, and the couple had two daughters, Jahanara (1974–1999) and Nurjahan (born 1979).

== Education ==
- 1958–62, National Diploma in Fine Art; National College of Arts – Lahore, Pakistan
- 1966–67, Post graduate studies: Hornsey College of Art, London
- 1968–69, post graduate studies: Royal College of Arts, London
- 1987 -89, post doctoral studies: Fulbright Research Fellowship at the Yale Institute of Sacred Music; Religion and the Arts and at Yale School of Art, Yale University, United States.

== Death ==
Akhlaq, and his elder daughter, Jahanara, were shot dead in their Lahore home on 18 January 1999, by a visiting acquaintance, Shahzad Butt, a roti merchant of the city. The killer could give no reason for having turned his gun on them.

== Work and influences ==
Akhlaq's painting invoked a dialogue between modernist abstraction and many traditional forms and practices found within South Asia (including Mughal Miniature painting, calligraphy and vernacular architecture). At a time when his contemporaries in South Asia were developing their work within a modernist tradition, or had primitivist leanings, he eschewed both schools by merging his interest in abstractions with traditional and vernacular practices. Although he evaded the label of an abstract artist, his work mostly fits this definition.

Akhlaq's influences are from a vast range of sources, which include painting, literature, philosophy, Sufism, dance, and music. His teaching and practice is considered to have had a significant impact on a generation of Contemporary Pakistani art and artists. Zahoor ul Akhlaq is best known for pioneering the contemporary miniature painting in Pakistan.

== Selected shows ==
- 1964 National exhibition, Lahore
- 1962 Solo exhibition, Karachi National Exhibition, Rawalpindi
- 1963 'Communication Through Art', Lahore, Karachi, Rawalpindi and Dhaka (Pakistan and Bangladesh)
- Solo exhibition, Karachi
- 1965 RCD Biennale, Tehran (Iran), 2nd position prize
- National exhibition of arts, Dhaka
- Solo exhibition, Art Galleries, Rawalpindi
- Joint exhibition, Ministry of Culture, Now York and Montreal
- 1967 Museum of Modern Arts; Paris Also four exhibitions in London and Oxford, England.
- 1969 Lahore Museum
- Post graduate show, Royal College of Art, London
- 1970 'Painting in Pakistan', travelling exhibition, 26 countries
- 1974 Solo exhibition, Pakistan Arts Council, Karachi
- 1975 'Graphics In Pakistan', Italy
- 1976 São Paulo Biennale (Brazil)
- 1981 Solo exhibition, Pakistan National Council of the Arts, Islamabad
- 1982 Hershorn Museum, Washington D.C.
- 'Thirty Five Years of Painting in Punjab', Lahore Asian Festival; Tokyo
- 1983 Represented Pakistan in Asian Festival of Art, Dhaka
- 1988 joint exhibition, Yale Institute of Sacred Music, Religion and the Arts, Yale University (USA)
- 1989 Solo exhibition, Yale University Solo exhibition, Galerie Mont Calm Hull, Canada
- Solo exhibitions at Rohtas Gallery, Islamabad in 1982, 1990, 1992
- Solo exhibitions at Chowkundi Gallery, Karachi, in 1986, 1990, 1991 and 1993
- Solo exhibition at The Ziggurat Gallery, Karachi, in 1990.

== Designs ==
Zahoor ul Akhlaq played an important role in the establishment of the Indus Valley School of Art and Architecture in Karachi. The logo of the Indus Valley School of Art and Architecture was designed by him. In 1981, he designed 2 of a set of 5 stamps issued to mark the Third Islamic Summit Conference at Makkah, Saudi Arabia. Both designs (40 paisas and Re 1) depicted an Afghan refugee girl.

== Academic appointments ==
- 1963–91 Lecturer in Art, then Assistant Professor, Associate Professor and finally full Professor of Art and Head of Department in the Faculty of Fine Arts, National College of Arts, Lahore from 1979 until his retirement
- 1991–'92 Visiting Professor at the Department of Fine Arts, Bilkent University, Ankara, Turkey
- 1994–'95 Visiting Professor, Ontario College of Art, Toronto, Ontario, Canada

== Memorials ==
An art gallery at the National College of Arts, Lahore is named in his memory as is the gallery at the Indus Valley School of Art and Architecture, Karachi.

== Commemorative postage stamp issued ==
On 14 August 2006, Pakistan Post issued a Rs. 40 sheetlet to posthumously honour 10 Pakistani Painters. Besides Zahoor ul Akhlaq, the other 9 painters are: Laila Shahzada, Askari Mian Irani, Sadequain, Ali Imam, Shakir Ali, Anna Molka Ahmed, Zubeida Agha, Ahmed Pervez and Bashir Mirza.

== Awards ==
- Sitara-i-Imtiaz (Star of Excellence) Award in 2006 by the President of Pakistan. Posthumously awarded in recognition of his contribution to the arts and education.
- Nishan-i-Imtiaz (Order of Excellence) award by the President of Pakistan in 2021.
