= Shakir Ali (artist) =

Pakistani modern artist

- Born: March 6, 1916
- Died: January 27, 1975 (aged 58); Pakistan
- Occupation: Artist
- Known for: Paintings and Contributions In Arts For Pakistan

Shakir Ali (Urdu: شاکر على) (1916-1975) was an influential modern Pakistani artist and an art teacher. He was the principal of the National College of Arts in Lahore. He first joined Mayo School of Arts as a lecturer in Art in 1954 and after changing the name of Mayo School to National College of Arts in 1958, he became its first Pakistani principal in 1962. Widely known to have inspired cubism among the artists of Lahore, he had a huge following of artists in Pakistan, most of whom were his students including Muhammad Ahmad Khan, Jamil Naqsh, Bashir Mirza, Ahmed Pervez and others.

== Career ==
Shakir Ali influenced the Pakistani modernist artists for two decades, both with his work and his disposition. He held a position of privilege among his generation of painters. He had firsthand experience of Modern Art in Paris. After studying art at the J.J. School of Art in Mumbai, he attended Slade School of Fine Art in London, then worked in Paris with Andre Lhote before he left for Prague to further study art.

Shakir Ali began with a cubist preference and many of his themes borrowed from classical European myths like ‘Europa and the Bull’ and ‘Leda and the Swan’. As his style evolved, he pared down the human form to sharp angles and took up red as a dominant colour. Many of his paintings feature birds, which he looked upon as the symbol of personal freedom in a world of conventions. He did some pioneering work in Arabic calligraphy in the 60s, in which the alphabetic form is used as a linear design using colour and visual rhythm to lend it a modern interpretation. Shakir Ali was amongst the first artists to practice painterly calligraphy. He served as Principal of the National College of Art, Lahore from 1961-73.

Shakir Ali was of the view that an artist belongs to the entire world and cannot be confined to any national boundaries. He was born in British India in 1916 and later chose to live the majority of his life in Lahore, Pakistan as an art educator.

== Commemorative postage stamp ==
On August 14, 2006, Pakistan Post issued a Rs. 40 sheetlet of stamps to posthumously honour 10 Pakistani painters. Besides Shakir Ali, the other nine painters were: Laila Shahzada, Askari Mian Irani, Sadequain, Ali Imam, Zahoor ul Akhlaq, Anna Molka Ahmed, Zubeida Agha, Ahmed Pervez and Bashir Mirza.

== Awards, recognition and legacy ==
- Pride of Performance Award by the President of Pakistan in 1966
- In 2016, on his 100th birthday, an event was arranged by the Pakistan National Council of the Arts (PNCA) in Lahore to pay tributes to painter Shakir Ali. Many writers and art critics, including Quddus Mirza were among the speakers. In summary, it was said that Shakir Ali added a flavor of modernity in the development of Pakistani art for later decades.
- In 1975, Pakistan National Council of the Arts (PNCA) inaugurated the Shakir Ali Museum in Lahore in his memory. All the personal belongings of Shakir Ali and his paintings and drawings are also showcased in a gallery there.
- As Principal of the National College of Arts in Lahore, he played a major role in shaping Pakistan’s modern art movement by teaching a generation of young artists in Pakistan.
- Nishan-i-Imtiaz (Order of Excellence) award by the President of Pakistan in 2021.
