= Allah Bakhsh (painter) =

Pakistani painter (1895–1978)

- Portrait of Allah Bakhsh
- Born: c. 1895; Wazirabad, Punjab, British India
- Died: 18 October 1978 (aged 82–83); Lahore, Punjab, Pakistan
- Resting place: Miani Sahib Graveyard, Lahore
- Known for: Painting; calligraphy
- Style: Folk art; landscape painting; narrative art; romantic art
- Movement: Realism
- Awards: Pride of Performance (1963); Tamgha-e-Imtiaz (1956)
- Patrons: Maharaja of Patiala (1937–38)
- Memorials: Ustad Allah Bakhsh Art Gallery

Ustad Allah Bakhsh (Note: sometimes spelled Allah Bux or Allah Bukhsh; Punjabi: استاد اللہ بخش, romanized: Ustād Allāh Bakhś) (c. 1895 – 18 October 1978) was a Pakistani painter and calligrapher who was actively involved in Punjabi cultural aesthetics and classical landscape paintings throughout his career. He produced his work in British India, and after the partition, in Pakistan. Most of his work revolves around Punjabi folklore, as well as traditional tales of Persian and Hindu mythology.

The recipient of prestigious national literary award, the Pride of Performance in 1963, he is primarily recognized for depicting tragic love stories of Sohni Mahiwal, Heer Ranjha and Tilism-e-Hoshruba, an epic story of Amir Hamza, a legendary Persian adventurer. His work sometimes also depicted the traditional festivals of Punjab. Some of the work he produced after independence was acquired by the National Art Gallery.

== Life and background ==
He was born around 1895 in Wazirabad, British Punjab, into a Punjabi family. He spent most of his life in Lahore. At first, he attended a Madrasa to study Urdu and Arabic, however, he subsequently left school. His father was a house painter who used to work at Mughalpura Railway Workshop.

== Career ==
At the apparent age of five, he joined Master Abdullah who trained him in artwork. He was first asked to practice the first three English alphabets (ABC) on slate. It is believed he practiced the letter "A" for the first three years, and subsequently the letters B and C to produce "ABC of art". He started his first artwork in 1913 and 1914 at Bhati Gate with nonrepresentational patterns. Initially, he copied Western painting to create visual characters, but later adopted original artwork with mythical subjects. In 1914, he went to Bombay (now Mumbai) for a better career where he stayed for five years and worked at Roop Naraine Photographic Studio as a background artist. His initial efforts didn't earn him recognition. He later created paintings of Krishna, a major deity in Hinduism which helped him to be recognized as an artist. After practicing Punjabi folklore and Hindu mythology, he became known as a "romantic painter". The newspapers of that time referred to him as the "master painter".

He moved back to Lahore in 1919 and worked as a commercial artist at Paisa Akhbar in Urdu Bazaar (Lahore) until 1922. Later in 1924, Maharaja Hari Singh of Jammu and Kashmir offered him a job as a court-painter, but he declined the offer. He worked at the court of Bhupinder Singh of Patiala from 1937 to 1938. After he left the court, he created a landscape painting of a woman living in a village along with her kids which became one of his prominent paintings.

During the last years of his life, he lost most of his eyesight due to cataract. Many people consider him one of the pioneer artists of modern landscape and figurative painting in the early years of Pakistan.

== Death and legacy ==
He died in Lahore on 18 October 1978 and is buried in the Muslim Town cemetery. In 1991, Pakistan Post issued a commemorative postage stamp to honor Allah Bakhsh in its 'Painters Of Pakistan' series.
