= SOMA Museum of Art =

Museum in Seoul, South Korea

Coordinates: 37.5170°N 127.1182°E

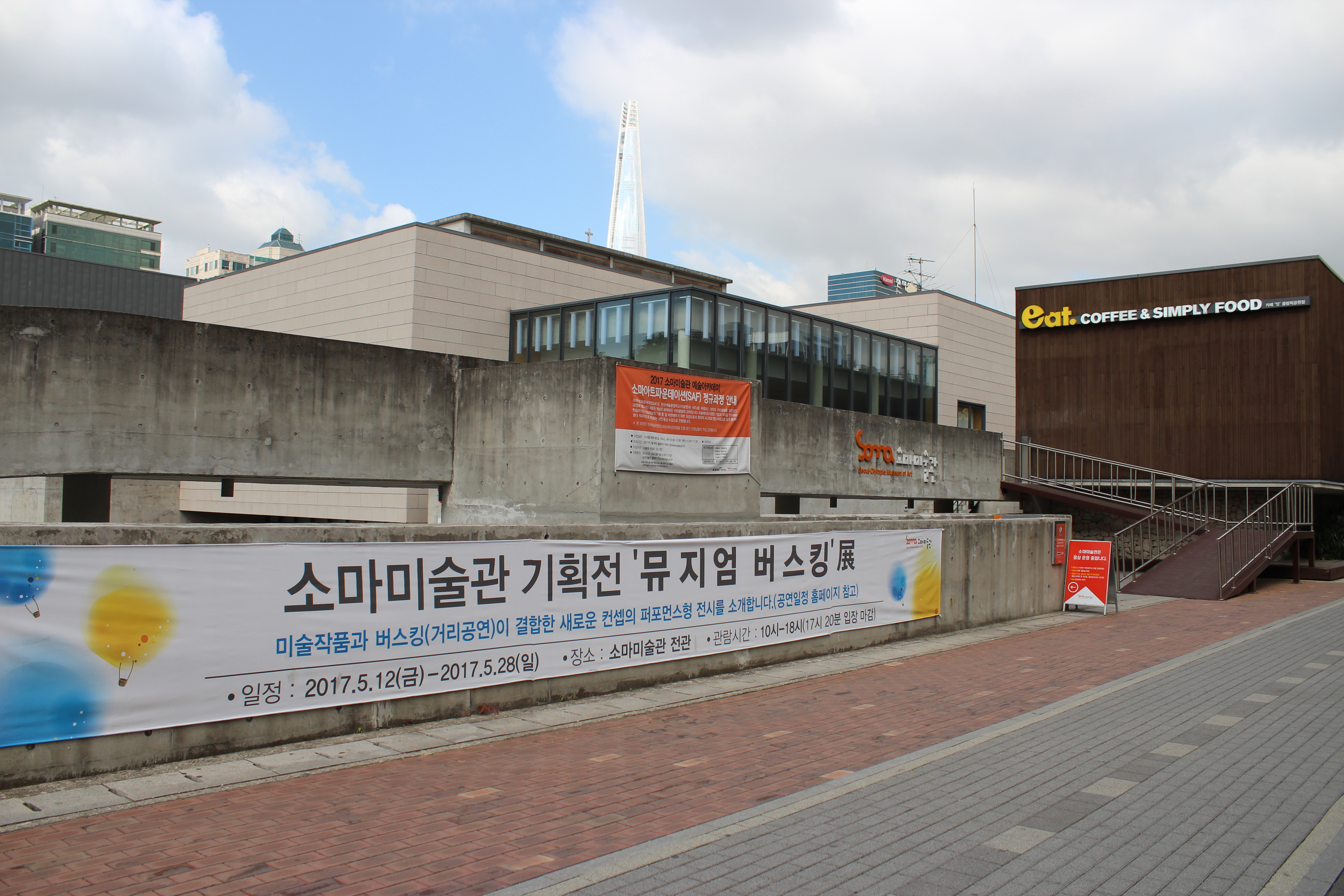
SOMA Museum of Art

The SOMA Museum of Art, formerly Seoul Olympic Art Museum, is a museum in Seoul, South Korea.

== See also ==
- List of museums in South Korea
