= Qudsia Nisar =

Pakistani painter (died 2021)

- Born: Pakistan
- Died: April 27, 2021; Islamabad, Pakistan
- Awards: Pride of Performance

Qudsia Azmat Nisar was a Pakistani painter and art educator.

== Academic career ==
From 1977 to 1992, Qudsia served as a lecturer and head of the Department of Fine Arts at the University of the Punjab, Lahore. She later served as chairperson of the Department of Fine Arts at the Islamia University of Bahawalpur from 2006 to 2010. Qudsia also taught at Mehran University of Engineering & Technology, Jamshoro.

== Awards ==
- 2018: Presidential Pride of Performance
