= Postal orders of Pakistan =

Postal orders are issued in Pakistan. Postal orders of Pakistan are issued in the denominations of Re. 1.00, Rs. 2.00, Rs. 5.00, Rs. 10.00, Rs. 15.00, Rs. 20.00, Rs. 30.00 and Rs. 50.00.

It is known that post offices in what is now Pakistan did issue Indian postal orders prior to 14 August 1947.
