= Salma Tassaduq Hussain =

Pakistani politician, Urdu poet, and Pakistan Movement activist (1908–1995)

Begum Salma Tassaduq Hussain
- سلمیٰ تصدق حسین

Member of the Punjab Legislative Assembly
- In office 1946–1947
- Constituency: Inner Lahore (Muslim women)

Member of the Punjab Legislative Assembly
- In office 1951 – 14 October 1955
- Constituency: Muslim Women–Inner Lahore

Personal details
- Born: Salma Mahmuda; 1908 Punjab, British India
- Died: August 1995 (aged 86–87)
- Resting place: Shadman Colony cemetery, Ichhra, Lahore
- Party: All-India Muslim League; Pakistan Muslim League
- Spouse: Tasadduq Hussain Khalid
- Education: University of the Punjab
- Occupation: Politician, writer, poet, and social worker

Begum Salma Tassaduq Hussain (Urdu: بیگم سلمیٰ تصدق حسین; born Salma Mahmuda; 1908–1995) was a Pakistani politician, Pakistan Movement activist, social worker, Urdu poet, and writer. A member of the All-India Muslim League, she was elected to the Punjab Legislative Assembly from a Muslim women's constituency in inner Lahore in 1946. She later served in the post-independence Punjab legislature and organised relief work for refugees during the Partition of India.

== Early life and education ==
Hussain was born as Salma Mahmuda in August 1908. She was the daughter of Mian Fazal Ilahi Bedil, an Urdu and Persian poet, and was raised in a literary family.

In 1922, she married Tasadduq Hussain Khalid, a lawyer and an early exponent of modern Urdu poetry. She continued her education after marriage and graduated from the University of the Punjab.

== Political career ==
Hussain became active in politics through the Punjab Provincial Women's Subcommittee of the Muslim League. In 1940, she was elected as one of its secretaries. She also helped establish primary schools and industrial homes for girls in Lahore.

In 1944, she was nominated to the working committee of the Punjab Muslim League. She participated in the Bengal Relief Fund Committee and represented the Muslim League at a conference of the Kisan Sabha in Jalandhar, where she chaired one of its sessions.

During the 1946 Indian provincial elections, Hussain contested a Lahore constituency on the Muslim League ticket and was elected to the Punjab Legislative Assembly. She was among the Muslim League's leading female campaigners and worked to mobilise Muslim women in support of the demand for Pakistan. During the 1946 Bihar riots, she travelled to the affected areas and spent nearly two months assisting displaced people. She later visited the North-West Frontier Province to assist the Muslim League's organisational activities during the civil disobedience movement.

Following independence in 1947, Hussain played a leading role in providing relief to the refugees arriving in Lahore. The Punjab Provincial Women's Muslim League established relief camps under her supervision. She offered her house on Empress Road for use as the Central Relief Office, which provided refugees with information, financial assistance, temporary accommodation, food, and clothing. She served as secretary of the Women Refugee Relief Committee, which worked with other women's groups to provide accommodation and assistance to displaced women and children during the violence and mass migration accompanying the partition of India.

She served as a member of the Punjab Legislative Assembly a second time, from 1951 to 1955, representing the Muslim Women–Inner Lahore constituency. She also served in the West Pakistan cabinet as deputy minister for labour.

== Literary work ==
Alongside her political activities, Hussain wrote poetry, short stories, and prose in Urdu. Her writings appeared in Urdu literary journals, and she translated a work on Cleopatra into Urdu.

Her published works included the poetry collections Gulhā-ye Rangā Rang and Qaumi Naghma, as well as the prose works Inqilab, Tameer, and Akhlaq. She also wrote Lāmakan tā Lāmakan, published in Karachi in 1974.

== Honours ==
In recognition of her involvement in the Pakistan Movement, Hussain received the Tamgha-i-Quaid-i-Azam in 1977. She was also awarded medals by the governments of Punjab and the North-West Frontier Province for her services during the independence movement.
