= George Butcher =

English footballer

Personal information
- Date of birth: 25 October 1890
- Place of birth: St Albans, Hertfordshire, England
- Date of death: 11 January 1970 (aged 79)
- Position: Inside forward

Senior career*
| Years | Team | Apps | (Gls) |
- St Albans City
| 1909–1921 | West Ham United | 96 | (17) |
| 1921–1926 | Luton Town | | |
- * Club domestic league appearances and goals

George Butcher (25 October 1890 – 11 January 1970) was an English footballer who played as an inside forward for various clubs in the early 1900s, including St Albans City, West Ham United and Luton Town. He was also the amateur lightweight boxing champion of Hertfordshire.

== Playing career ==
Butcher was born in St Albans, Hertfordshire and started his career with his home town side, St Albans City. He moved to West Ham in 1909 and scored on his debut on 2 March 1910 in a 2–1 away defeat to Watford played at their Cassio Road stadium. He has made over 70 appearances before his playing-time was limited by the outbreak of World War I. Making 33 appearances in the first season after the end of the war, Butcher made only one appearance the following season before transferring to Luton Town in 1921 where he remained for the next five seasons.

== After football ==
After retiring from football in 1926, Butcher returned to his family business of building artesian wells.
