= Sadequain =

Pakistani artist and poet

Sadequain Naqqash
- Born: Syed Sadequain; 30 June 1930; Amroha, British India (present-day Uttar Pradesh, India)
- Died: 10 February 1987 (aged 56); Karachi, Pakistan
- Resting place: Sakhi Hassan Graveyard, Karachi
- Known for: Calligraphy, Painting, Murals, Poetry
- Movement: Islamic calligraphy; Hurufiyya movement
- Honours: Hilal-e-Imtiaz, Sitara-i-Imtiaz, Tamgha-e-Imtiaz, and Pride of Performance
- Website: Sadequain Foundation

Syed Sadequain Ahmed Naqvi (Urdu: سیّد صادِقَین احمد نقوی) TI PP SI NI (30 June 1930 – 10 February 1987), and often referred to as Sadequain Naqqash ("Sadequain the Painter"), was a Pakistani artist and poet best known for his skills as a calligrapher and a painter. He is considered one of the finest painters and calligraphers Pakistan has ever produced, having painted around 15,000 paintings. He was also a poet, writing hundreds of rubāʿiyāt in the style of Omar Khayyam and Sarmad Kashani.

== Early life ==
Sadequain was born on 30 June 1930 in Amroha, into an educated Shia family who considered calligraphy a valuable skill. The artist claimed to own seven Qurans calligraphed by his ancestors and family. He migrated to Pakistan with his family during the 1947 partition, residing in the Nazimabad neighbourhood of Karachi. In the late 1940s he joined the Progressive Writers' and Artists Movement. He was supported by politician Huseyn Suhrawardy.

== Medium of work ==
=== Calligraphy ===
Sadequain was widely praised for his calligraphy by many critics of South Asian art.

Sadequain was part of a broader Islamic art movement, known as the Hurufiyya movement, which emerged independently across North Africa and parts of Asia in the 1950s. Hurufiyah refers to the attempt by artists to combine traditional art forms, notably calligraphy as a graphic element within a contemporary artwork. Hurufiyah artists rejected Western art concepts, and instead searched for a new visual languages that reflected their own culture and heritage. These artists successfully transformed calligraphy into a modern aesthetic, which was both contemporary and indigenous. Prior to Sadequain's work, only a few painters had experimented with the medium in Pakistan. Sadequain is a pioneer of the style, bringing calligraphy into a mainstream art form, and influencing subsequent generations of Pakistani artists.

=== Murals ===
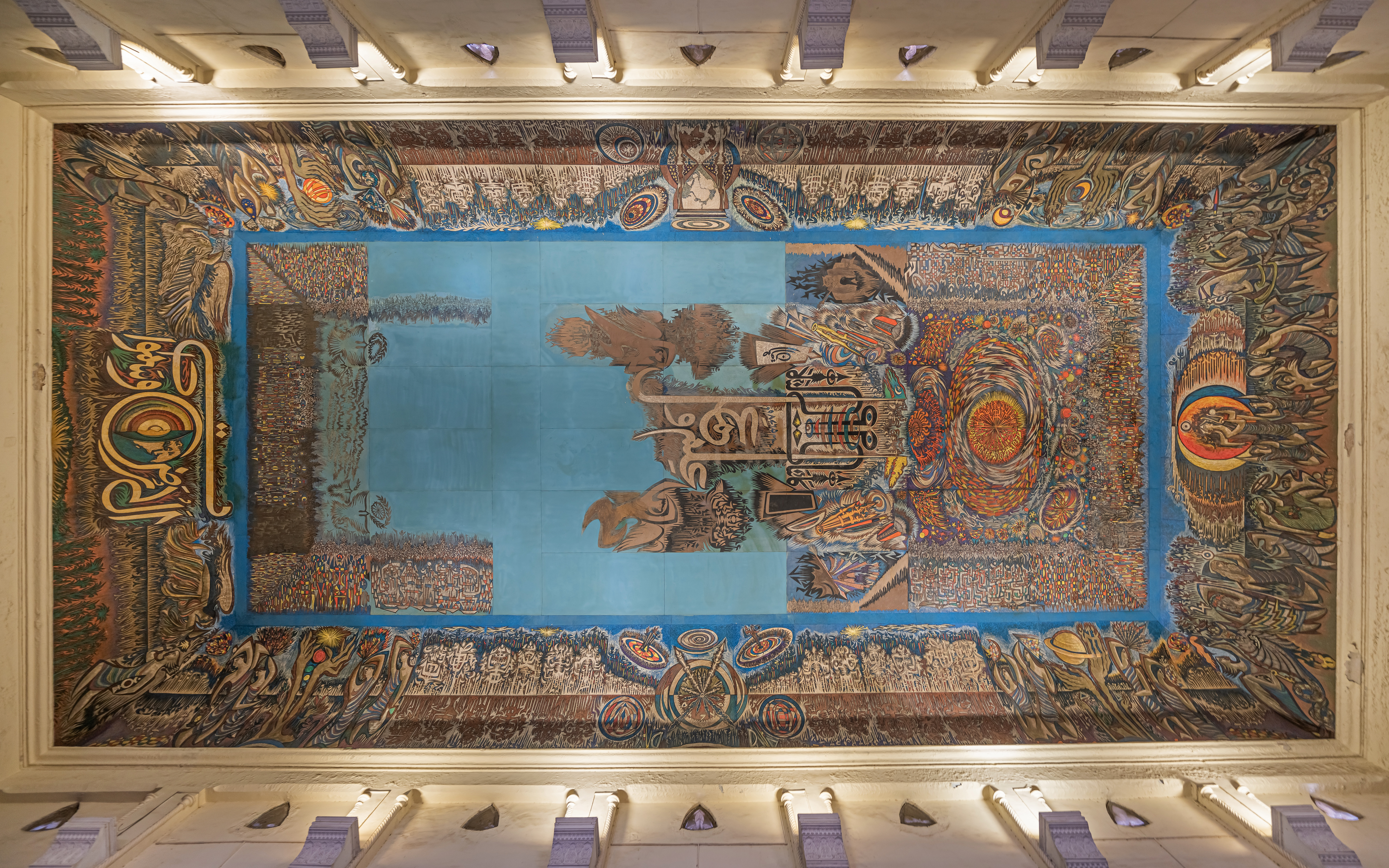
Ceiling of Frere Hall, entire view

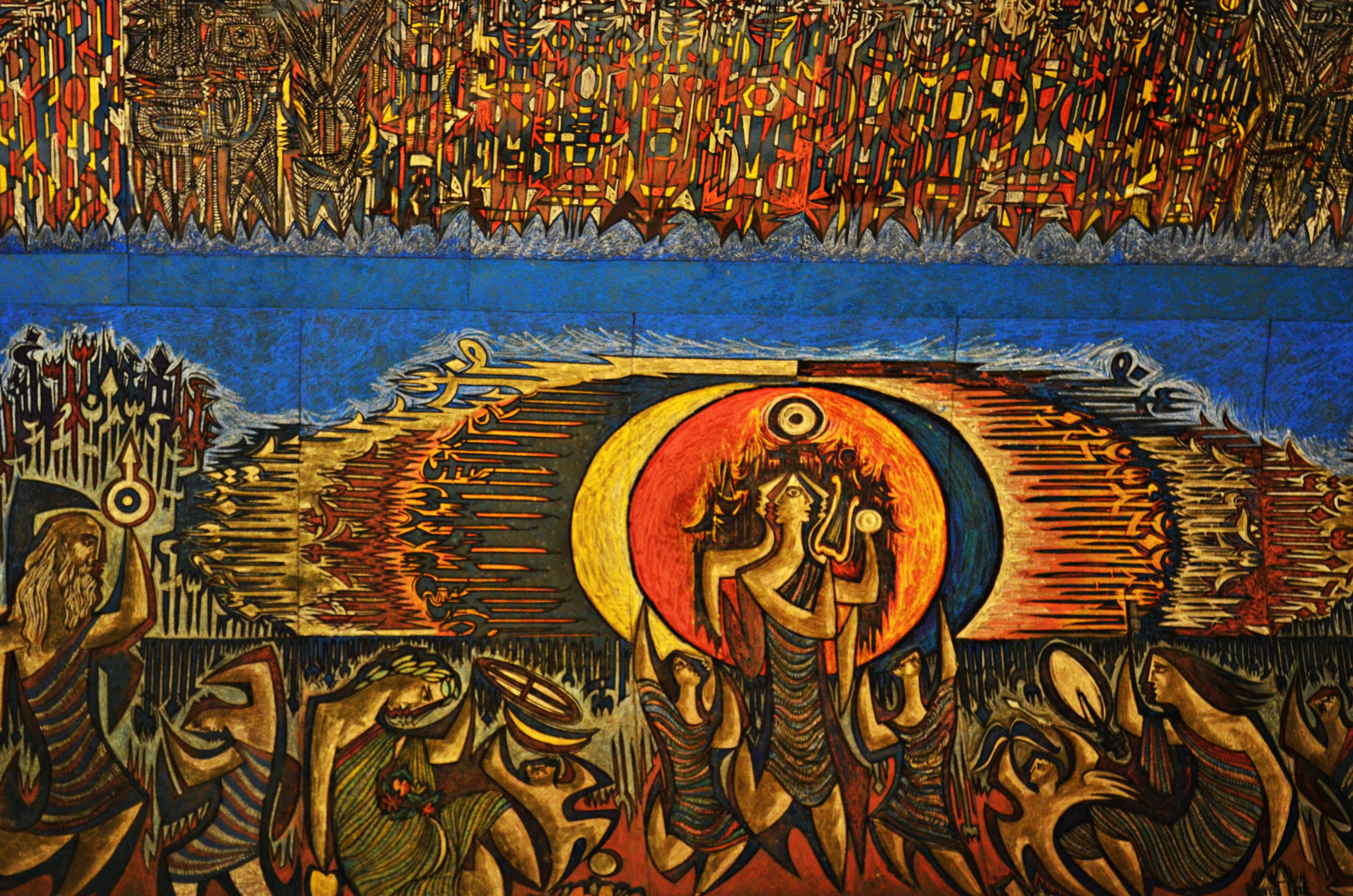
Ceiling of Frere Hall, detail

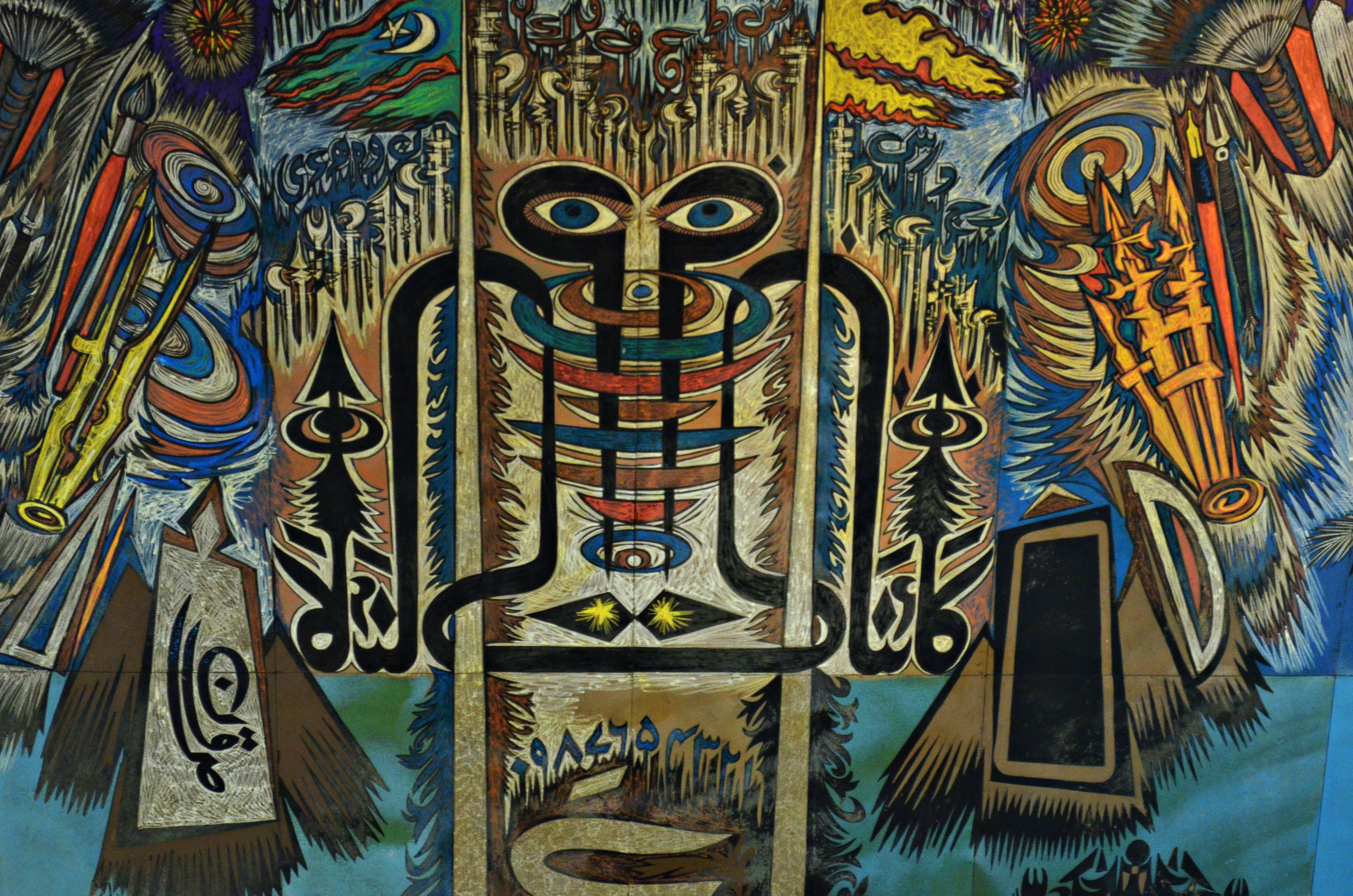
Ceiling of Frere Hall, detail

Sadequain was a social commentator, and preferred to paint on public buildings instead of private ones that were owned by the wealthy. He did not like the idea that if he was painting for the wealthy, then his art would only be enjoyed by a small percentage, leaving out all of the public. His murals are densely filled and tightly packed with images to render adequately the lofty subject. As a master muralist some of his works adorn the halls of:

- The State Bank of Pakistan (100 x 12 ft)
- The Power House at the Mangla Dam (170 x 23 ft)
- Lahore Museum, Lahore
- Aligarh Muslim University (70 x 12 ft)
- Banaras Hindu University (70 x 12 ft) and
- Geological Institute of India (70 x 25 ft)
- Frere Hall Karachi
- Powerhouse at Abu Dhabi
- Punjab University Library

His monumental murals, in excess of thirty-five, adorn the halls of State Bank, Frere Hall Karachi; Lahore Museum; Punjab University; Mangla Dam; Aligarh Muslim University; Banaras Hindu University; Indian Institute of Geological Sciences; Islamic Institute in Delhi, and Abu Dhabi Power House, among others. His paintings and calligraphies in the building of the Islamic Institute in Delhi alone cover more than seven thousand square feet. Sadequain painted his earliest murals at Jinnah Hospital and PIA headquarters in the 1950s. These murals have disappeared and their fate is unknown.

In 1961 he painted a huge mural (62'X10') in the Head Office of the State Bank of Pakistan in Karachi, titled "Treasures of Time," in which he showed the intellectual advance of man from the times of Socrates to that of Iqbal and Einstein. It is a linear creation that shows a pageant of intellectuals and thinkers of the Greek era, mathematicians and chemists of the Middle East, scholars of the European Renaissance, and 20th-century laureates. This large mural has endured transportation from the State Bank to Mohatta Palace (for the exhibition The Holy Sinner), and back to State Bank and has deep scars to prove the ordeal.

Sadequain painted the ceiling of the Lahore museum entrance hall, depicting the Evolution of Mankind, and additional nine large panels of calligraphies for the Islamic Gallery. The ceiling spans approximately 100 x 35 feet (11 m). The Panjab government has recently allocated money for the restoration of the mural.

Punjab University houses the mural "Quest of Knowledge" in its library. The mural appropriately depicts the academic theme commensurate with the institution of learning where it is housed. Young men and women are shown holding high the key to learning that unleashes riches in their lives. The mural is mounted high up against the ceiling of the main library and appears to be in good condition.

The mural in the Punjab Library (adjacent to Lahore Museum) is mounted in the library hall located on the main floor. All four sections of the mural have been disassembled and dismounted because of the damage to the building due to water seepage.

The ceiling of the Frere Hall, Karachi displays in bold, the words, Arz-o-Samawat (Earth and the Heavens) bears a historical significance, since it represents the last piece of work by Sadequain. He died before he could complete it.

The mural titled "Saga of Labor" by Sadequain at Mangla Dam is a tribute to the working men and women of the society. The mural hangs in the powerhouse of Mangla Dam and so far endured the harsh environmental conditions of the huge enclosure that also houses gigantic electric turbines. It was completed in six weeks, and sold for a total amount of 250,000 Rupees or $25,000 in US Dollars.

Banaras Hindu University houses one large mural.

In his lifetime there were two galleries named after him by the authorities, but they no longer exist.

=== Rubaiyat ===
Sadequain came from the small town of Amroha in Uttar Pradesh, India. It was his great-grandfather, under whose tutelage Mir Taqi Mir – considered the father of Urdu poetry – developed his poetic skills at an early age. Mir Anis, the preeminent religious poet from Lucknow, was the understudy of one of his ancestors too. He witnessed his elders delve into poetry, calligraphy, and even classical music to the extent it complimented marsia khwani – the revered practice to commemorate the martyrdom of Imam Hussain in Karbala.

Starting in the last quarter of 1969, and through the first few months of 1970, Sadequain concentrated on composing, inscribing, and illustrating hundreds of rubaiyyat. In the prologue of his collection of rubaiyyat, Sadequain compared his accomplishment as an audacious confluence of global talent, the rubaiyyat of poet Omar Khayyam, transcription by the renowned calligrapher Yaqoot and illustration by the legendary painter Mani. “That of course would produce a magnificent piece of work”, he stated, “however, no matter how grand, it would still be a group show.” Sadequain reached for the ultimate one-man show, and produced a masterpiece collection of rubaiyyat, which was adjudged for first prize by the Literary Society of Pakistan. Sadequain privately published 4 books of rubaiyyat; Rubaiyyat-e-Sadequain Naqqash, Rubaiyyat-e-Sadequain Khattat, Rubaiyyat-e-Sadequaini, and Juzw-e-Bosida. The collection titled Rubaiyyat-e-Sadequain Naqqash was an illustrated version with over two hundred drawings. The collection of rubaiyyat titled Juzw-e-Bosida, dating back to the poetry of his teen years, was printed privately in the 1980s, but the drawings of his teen years were lost or destroyed.

=== Speaker of truth ===
In a 1971 interview with Sadequain he noted " I am not a drawing room artist, but the artist of the gutter: my art is for the people" which was in response to what was happening politically with Pakistans military campaigning. The interviewer went on to ask Sadequain if they were a communist and he responded with "If Communism means that people have the right to clothe themselves, if they are able to eat and get shelter- well then I am a communist."

Best known for his calligraphies, Sadequain painted abstracts, drawings, and sketches on thousands of canvases, volumes of paper, and multitudes of other conventional and unconventional materials.

=== Renaissance of Islamic calligraphy ===
Sadequain was responsible for the renaissance of Islamic calligraphy in Pakistan. He was one of the greatest calligraphers of Pakistan and helped transform the art of calligraphy into serious expressionist paintings. He claimed that his transformation into a calligrapher was manifested by divine inspiration. He did not follow the established tradition and created his own style of script. His alphabets exude motion, mood, and paint vivid pictures of the message of the words of Quran. Sadequain claimed that many of his paintings, especially after the seventies, had been based on calligraphic forms to portray images of cities, buildings, forests, men, and women.

In Pakistan, the art of calligraphy was relegated to a second-class status until Sadequain adapted this medium in the late nineteen sixties. Until then a few painters experimented with the medium but it remained just that, an experiment. After Sadequain transformed the art of calligraphy into a mainstream art form, most of the known Pakistani artists have followed Sadequain and calligraphic art now dominates the art scene.

=== Artist ===
In the 1960s Sadequain was invited by the French authorities to illustrate the award-winning novel The Stranger by French writer Albert Camus. Sadequain also illustrated on canvas the poetry of Ghalib, Iqbal and Faiz as homage to their place in classical literature. Sadequain wrote thousands of quartets, which address a common theme of social and cultural dogmas and published them.

=== His works ===
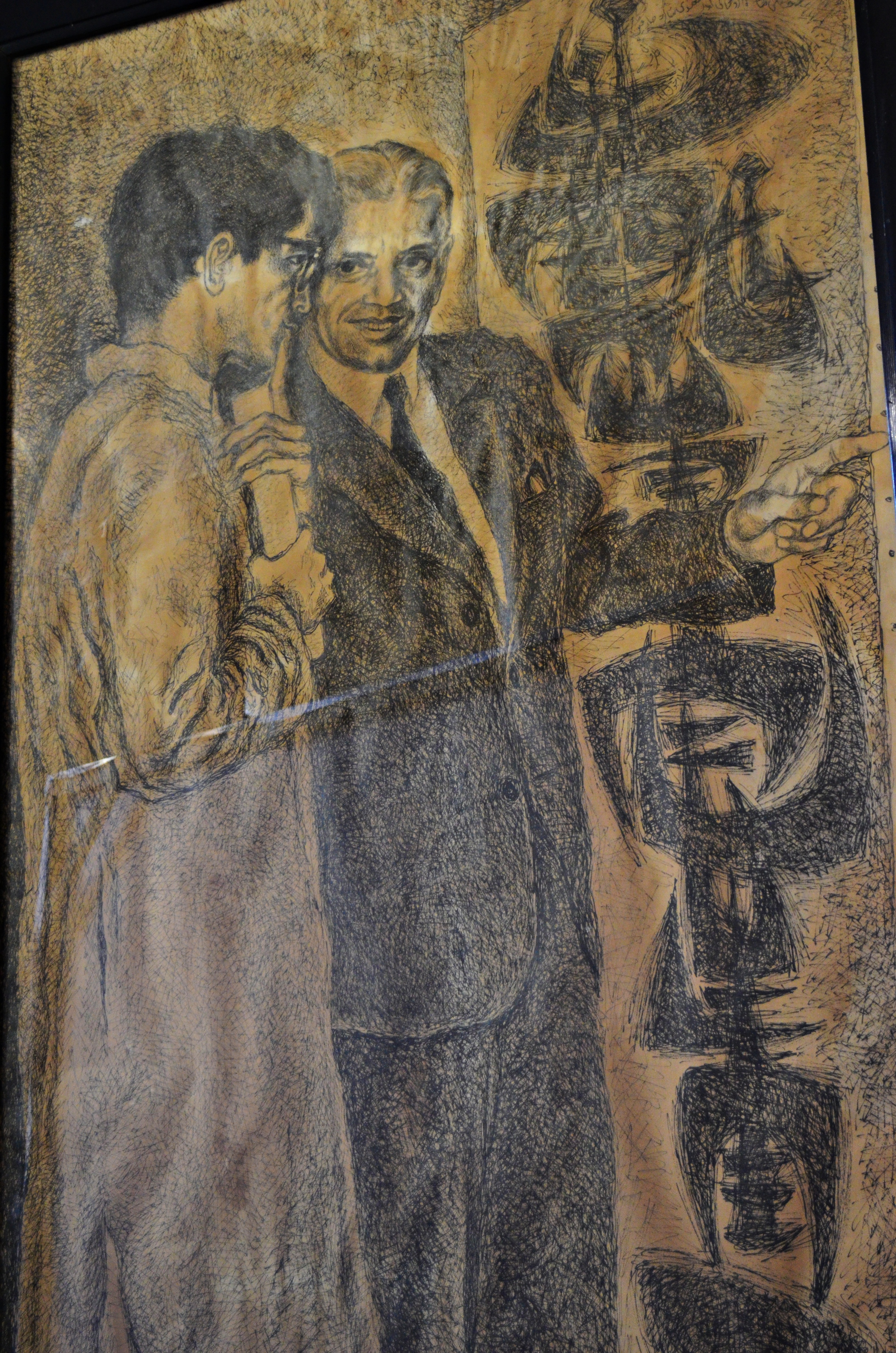
Sketch Sadequain with Muhammad Ali Jinnah, by Sadequain, on display at Frere Hall

During the 1960s he stayed in interior Sindh, in areas surrounded by desert, where nothing could grow except cactus which would break through the rugged sandy ground. The sight of the wild cactus growing in scorching heat and surviving the harshest of conditions left a lasting impression on Sadequain. He adapted this symbol to depict labour, struggle, and persistence against natural elements of resistance and triumph of hard work.

Sadequain sketched numerous drawings titled Cobweb Series, Crow Series, Christ Series, Hope Series, and Sun Series during the sixties, which were commentaries on prevailing social and cultural conditions. Sadequain saw cobwebs engulfing our society rendering it speechless and motionless. The Crow Series projected men as timid worshippers of scarecrows because they have lost self-respect and spirituality. Crows however are not intimidated and gang up on humanity in flocks and pick on lifeless humans. In the Christ Series Sadequain showed the crime being committed in front of the Christ while he was still alive on the Cross.

Contrary to man's images portrayed in Cobweb or Crow Series of drawings, Sadequain glorified the hard work and labour of ordinary workingmen by showing them struggling with primitive tools during the Stone Age, developing agricultural land, discovering scientific breakthroughs, and exploring the universe. He sometimes used Kufic script to form human images and carried that theme through vast canvases. One of the representative works of this genre is titled "The Last Supper," which was awarded the prestigious Binnale de Paris award in France. Sadequain was awarded first prize in National Exhibition of Pakistan in the early sixties. He was bestowed with several awards and medals in Pakistan as well as foreign countries. But he seldom attended the award ceremonies or accepted the award money.

Sadequain had a commanding knowledge of literature. He wrote thousands of "Rubaiyats," which he published in several books. These verses have been adjudged unique and critically acclaimed by the literary elite. Like his paintings, the verses also address the topics of human nature, virtues and weaknesses of society.

During his life Sadequain exhibited his works on all continents. His exhibitions in foreign countries were sponsored at State levels and were attended by large audiences from all walks of life. A "faqir" at heart he gave away most of his paintings to friends and foes, and painted gigantic murals in public buildings at no cost. He declared the giveaways as gifts to the citizens of the cities where the public buildings were situated.

Sadequain has been covered in the print and electronic media extensively such as the TV series "Mojeeza-e-Fun" which highlighted his work in a masterful documentary. "The Holy Sinner" is a book published in 2003, cataloguing a number of his paintings, which were exhibited at Mohatta Palace, Karachi during the same year. The massive book is one of the largest and heaviest ever published in Pakistan and it also has a collection of articles about Sadequain published previously in magazines and papers over the course of years.

=== List of key works ===
* Painting, Aftaab-e-Taaza, illustration of lines by Allama Iqbal, 9 by 6 feet (1.8 m), now in the collection of Pakistan's Unicorn Gallery

- 1955 – Mural at Jinnah Hospital, exhibitions at Frere Hall
- 1963 – Held several exhibitions while visiting the US
- 1964–65 – Lithographic illustration of L'Étranger by Albert Camus
- 1967 – Executed mural at Mangla Dam
- 1968 – Executed mural at Punjab University Library
- 1969 – Calligraphy of Sura-e-Rehman
- 1969 - Crucifixion series - of which one painting was sold at GBP 118,750 during a 2017 auction at Bonhams in London.
- 1970 – One-man show
- 1970 – Produced a masterpiece collection of rubaiyyat, which was adjudged for first prize by the Literary Society of Pakistan. Sadequain privately published book of rubaiyyat; Rubaiyyat-e-Sadequain Naqqash.
- 1973 – Murals in Lahore Museum
- 1974 – Exhibitions in the Middle East and Eastern Europe
- 1976 – Mural at National Bank of Pakistan, adjacent to GPO at Shahrah-e-Quaid-e-Azam, Lahore
- 1976 – T.V. Series Mojiza-e-Fun
- 1977 – Illustrations of the classical Urdu literature, especially the poetry of Ghalib, Iqbal and Faiz on canvas.
- 1979 – Mural in Abu Dhabi
- 1981 – Tour of India, murals at Aligarh, Banaras, Hyderabad, Delhi
- 1985 – Illustrated Faiz Ahmad Faiz
- 1986 – Mural at Frere Hall

=== Reverence ===
The mammoth book "The Holy Sinner: Sadequain", is a tribute and celebration of this Pakistani artist's vitality, innovation, restless fervor and immense amount of energy. This book launched as the third stage of a monumental project with the same title is possibly the largest art project in the sub-continent to pay tribute to a single artist under the aegis of Mohatta Palace Museum. The first stage of the project was an exhibition of paintings of Sadequain under the same title and the second stage of the project; a black and white catalogue of Sadequain's work was launched last year. The fourth stage of the project will consist of four documentaries; both in Urdu and English language and one special feature film would be produced about the internationally recognised artist.

The book of about 700 pages, weighing 12 kg, includes the reproduction of some 400 of Sadequain's creations, supported by an anthology of critical commentaries by the artist's contemporaries and journalists including renowned artistic figures and critics. It contains essays on the great artist and plates of his paintings and sketches. The sections in the book consist of Photographic Essay, Critical Approaches, Recollections, Reproductions, Catalogue, Pictures at an Exhibition, Rubaiyat, Photo Epilogue, Afterward, Life and Works. The book is largest monograph in the region compiled and produced to pay unprecedented tribute to a single artist, setting a new trend for paying tributes to artists in South Asia.

Some of the themes of the paintings in the book are 'A stranger in paradise', 'Endless purgatory', 'Rhapsody in Blue', 'Wheel in fire', 'A long day', 'Of human bondage' also included in bold form the poetic verses of Ghalib, Iqbal and Faiz.

The book is primarily based on the famous exhibition of paintings of Sadequain titled, The Holy Sinner: Sadequain which ended about a year ago and was by far the largest-attended and longest-running exhibition in the history of Pakistani art. Salima Hashmi, daughter of the late poet Faiz Ahmad Faiz and Hameed Haroon, proprietor of Dawn Publications were the co-curators of the groundbreaking exhibition. The exhibition, featuring more than 200 non-calligraphic works of the Amroha-born artist, was held at Mohatta Palace Museum and it remained open for approximately one year.

The exhibition was attended by more than 90,000 art lovers at a cost of Rs 100 each who saw rare paintings and murals by Sadequain whose commercial worth, at a low estimate, was more than Rs 500 million.

Sadequain was an untraditional and self-made, self-taught painter and calligrapher who created a mysterious and mystic environment with his bold and uninhibited use of media and lines had a cult-like following in his own lifetime. His unique style, whether pertaining to his paintings or calligraphy, was widely referred to as "Khat-e-Sadequain" primarily evolved during his stay at a Karachi seaside desert called Gadani. The Holy Sinner: Sadequain contains over 400 of his series of drawings, paintings, and murals, each representing a different phase of his career and depicting his unique strokes, style, and color schemes. It was at Gadani that Sadequain observed the wild growth of cactus in the scorching heat of desert where water was scarce and conditions were harshest. Yet the cactus grew tall, shooting upwards in defiance of all odds. The powerful symbol of defiant cactus transcends throughout Sadequain's work and creates a lasting impression on the observer.

The exhibition was a rare opportunity for the viewers because Sadequain, who became a virtual household word for his calligraphic works did not exhibit his abstract paintings during the last days of his life and of course the large number of murals that he painted were dedicated to specific locations only. Hameed Haroon described very aptly as follows: "Sadequain's symbols are part-calligraphic strokes, part-sacred standards or alams that first emerged in the eighth century as the symbols of the armies of Shi'ite Islam, perhaps most visible as representations of allegorical virtue in the annual Moharram ritual following the Karbala massacre; part Sufic tributes to the son-in-law of the Islamic prophet Muhammad, the martyred Ali, whose horned alif in the Kufic script provokes a militancy of sentiment and a plea for transformation based, ironically enough, on the fundamentals of early Islam."

The paintings in the exhibition were loaned by virtually who is who of the Pakistani elite. In his lifetime Sadequain hardly ever sold his paintings to individuals. As an ironic twist of circumstances he is perhaps the only artist with the distinction that his work is openly copied and sold for handsome profits by his imitators. Recently two news stories were printed in local papers, which testify, in the most unconventional manner, to the great stature of Sadequain. Both news stories were related to burglars, one in which a house belonging to one of the prominent artists in Karachi was broken into and the thieves got away with jewelry and other petty items, and the other incident involved the house of a well to do citizen where the stolen items included only the paintings by Sadequain.

The book, The Holy Sinner: Sadequain, includes drawings series titled, Cacti series, the Sun series, Exposition series, Cobweb series, etc.A word about the Cobweb series is appropriate because it was created during the turbulent times of 1960s and the drawings depict men and women, even the building structures immobilised by cobwebs as though in decay and transgressing instead of marching on the rocky road to the peaks of perfection. There was two sides to how the public perceived Sadequain's new work with some of his fans wanting a more positive outlook compared to the other half being "consumed" into the darkness. Everyone would come together in the lettes-to-the-editors section of the "Leader" newspaper and discuss how Sadequain's new pieces "The Cobweb Series" had affected them and what there individual take was compared to others that had seen this piece.

The paintings in The Holy Sinner: Sadequain, represent various themes such as man's struggle against natural odds, mother and child, still life figures from the early life of the artist and many others. The centerpiece of the book is its treatment of the famous mural by Sadequain commissioned for the State Bank of Pakistan. The mural titled “The Treasures of Time” depicts evolution of mankind and traces the history of great scholars, philosophers, scientists, mathematicians, poets, and writers. It is said that the mural became a turning point in the intellectual development of Sadequain. Hameed Haroon noted that from this onwards, his intellectual force entered the world of Ovid, the romance of Alexander and the Amroha-spun tales of ancient Greece and Rome, leading to a unique fusion in Pakistan's art history.

=== Lost paintings ===
In his lifetime two art galleries were established by the official authorities, one in Islamabad called Gallery Sadequain, which was located in Block F and the second one in the Frere Hall Karachi, also called Gallery Sadequain. After he died, the Islamabad gallery was disassembled and some two hundred paintings were unaccounted for and the Frere Hall gallery is closed for all practical purposes because of security reasons. Forty calligraphic panels on marble slabs measuring 6 ft (1.8 m) x 5 ft each have disappeared.

At the time of his death at OMI Clinic in Karachi, his attendant was present when Sadequain took his last breath at 2:00 am. The attendant did not inform the doctors of Sadequain's death and instead took off for Frere Hall where Sadequain had been working on the ceiling. The attendant loaded as many paintings as he could in a Suzuki van, took them to a safe house and then returned to the hospital to inform the doctors. The stolen paintings are resurfacing for sale at regular frequency.

PIA owned Mid Way House hotel had a big Sadequain's painting at entrance and lot of other artwork by renowned Pakistani artists. After the sale of the hotel, all that art treasure is not on display or submitted to any art gallery.

=== Auction history ===
In 2014, Sadequain's 'Imagination' was sold for £60,000 at Bonhams.

In 2015, Sadequain's 'Qalandar' was sold for $173,000 at Christie's.

In 2017, Sadequain's ‘Crucifixion’ made history for Pakistan after it was sold for £118,750 at Bonhams.

== Death ==
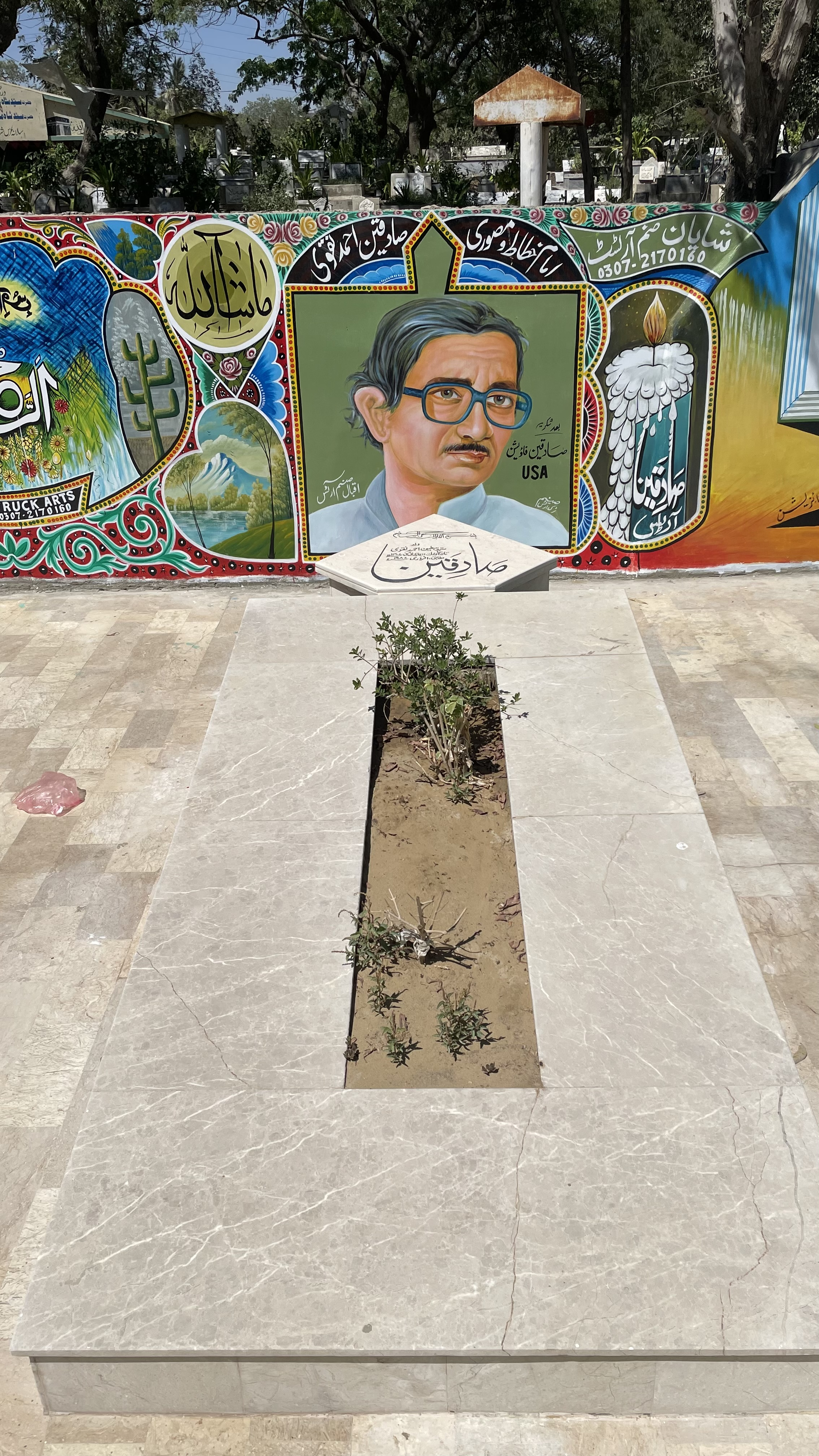
Sadequain's grave in Karachi

Sadequain died on 10 February 1987 at Karachi, Pakistan at the age of 56. He is buried in Sakhi Hassan Graveyard in Karachi.

== Awards, honours and recognition ==
- 1960 – Government of Pakistan – Tamgha-e-Imtiaz
- 1961 – Government of France – Biennale de Paris Award
- 1962 – President of Pakistan – Pride of Performance Award
- 1975 – Government of Australia – "Cultural Award"
- 1980 – Government of Pakistan – Sitara-e-Imtiaz
- 1982 – Gold Mercury International Award in Global Culture
- 2000 – Sadequain Institute of Arts & Information Technology established
- 2021 - Government of Pakistan - Posthumous Nishan-i-Imtiaz

== Commemorative stamp ==
On 14 August 2006, Pakistan Post issued a Rs. 40 sheetlet to posthumously honour 10 Pakistani Painters. Besides Sadequain, the other 9 painters are: Laila Shahzada, Askari Mian Irani, Zahoor ul Akhlaq, Ali Imam, Shakir Ali, Anna Molka Ahmed, Zubeida Agha, Ahmed Pervez and Bashir Mirza.

== See also ==
- Shafiq-Uz-Zaman Khan
