= Ismail Gulgee =

Pakistani artist

Gulgee گل جی
- Born: Ismail Gulgee; 25 October 1926; Peshawar, NWFP, British Raj
- Died: 16 December 2007 (aged 81); Karachi, Pakistan
- Resting place: Imam Muslim Cemetery, Karachi
- Education: Masters in Soil Mechanics (Harvard University); Masters in Hydraulics (Columbia University)
- Known for: Islamic calligraphy, Painting, Sculptures
- Movement: Islamic calligraphy
- Spouse: Zareen Gulgee
- Children: 2
- Awards: Pride of Performance
- Website: ismail-gulgee.com

Ismail Gulgee (Urdu: اسماعیل گل جی); 25 October 1926 – 16 December 2007), also known simply as Gulgee, was a Pakistani painter.

Born in Peshawar, he received his early education at Lawrence College before attending Aligarh University, Columbia University, and Harvard University for higher education. He started off painting portraits before turning to abstract art, basing his works on Islamic calligraphy. He gained international acclaim, and was commissioned to paint several leaders, including US Presidents Jimmy Carter and George H. W. Bush, the Shah of Iran, King Hussein of Jordan, King Faisal of Saudi Arabia, and Pakistani leaders Zulifqar Ali Bhutto and President Ayub Khan.

On 19 December 2007, he was found murdered at his house with his wife and maid. After a lengthy investigation, his driver and servant were convicted and given life sentences on 23 May 2017.

== Early life and education ==
Gulgee was born on 25 October 1926 at Karimpura locality in Peshawar, Pakistan. For his education, he went to Lawrence College Murree and then to Aligarh University to study civil engineering. Then he went to the United States to continue his higher education. While he was an engineering student at Columbia University, he started to paint. Later, Gulgee also studied at Harvard University.

== Painting style ==
Before 1959, as a portraitist, Gulgee painted the entire Afghan Royal Family. In the early 1960s, he turned to abstract painting. Gulgee was a skilled naturalistic portrait painter who had enjoyed (according to Partha Mitter) "lavish state support" and plenty of elite commissions in this capacity. Nevertheless, he was perhaps best known worldwide for his abstract work, which was inspired by Islamic calligraphy and was also influenced by the "action painting" movement of the 1950s and 1960s. Some people say that Elaine Hamilton was a strong influence on him. In both Islamic calligraphy and action painting, a high value is placed on the unity and energy of gestural flow. Gulgee's canvases were often quite large in the tradition of other action painters or abstract expressionists. Sometimes he used materials such as mirror glass and gold or silver leaf in his oil paintings. Therefore, in fact, they appeared to be mixed media pieces.

According to the Metropolitan Museum of Art (see external links): "Gulgee's calligraphy paintings are abstract and gestural interpretations of Arabic and Urdu letters. His sweeping layers of paint explore the formal qualities of oil paint while they make references to Islamic design elements."

Beginning in the 1960s (if not earlier), Gulgee (along with his younger brother Agha Sadaruddin (a well-known filmmaker and photographer for Time and Life), also created sculptures, including bronze pieces that were (like so many of his paintings) calligraphic in form and inspiration, and sometimes specifically based on verses from the Quran.

His son Amin Gulgee is also a famous artist.

== International and special assignments ==
Guljee received many requests for his paintings internationally, from the Saudi royal family to the Islamabad presidency. Many of his works are placed in the Faisal Mosque in Islamabad.

== Painting exhibitions ==
Gulgee held his first painting exhibition in 1950.

Gulgee's exhibitions have mostly been available to few people. Keeping that in mind and high public demand, an art gallery for Gulgee has been built in Clifton, Karachi, near South City Hospital and Sea View Karachi. Gulgee mostly painted for his own inspiration and vision. Although selected paintings are displayed at Clifton Art Gallery.

== Murder ==
Gulgee, his wife Zarrin Gulgee and a maid were found dead by strangulation in their house on the evening of 19 December 2007 by his servants. Police suspect that all three had been murdered. While the bodies were found on the 19th, officials report that they had apparently been deceased for three days, leading to a speculative death date of 16 December 2007. Their bodies were found bound and gagged in separate rooms of the house. The initial cause of death for all three had been attributed to suffocation. According to press reports, his son reported that Gulgee's car and driver were missing and a foul smell coming from his parents' home. Gulgee was buried on the evening of 20 December 2007 in Karachi.

Meanwhile, Gulgee's driver and another servant were arrested by the police as suspects and tried in court. The court case lingered on for many years. Finally, in May 2017, both of them were convicted and handed down life imprisonment sentences.

== Awards and recognition ==
- Pride of Performance Award in 1970 by the President of Pakistan
- Sitara-e-Imtiaz (Star of Excellence) Award in 1982 by the Government of Pakistan
- Hilal-e-Imtiaz (Crescent of Excellence) Award in 1995 by the President of Pakistan

== See also ==
- Islamic calligraphy (primary source of inspiration for Gulgee's abstract works)
- Action painting (Gestural abstraction)
- Elaine Hamilton (American action painter and colleague who influenced Gulgee, according to Partha Mitter)
- Mixed media
- Abstract expressionism
- Amjad Ali, S. Gulgee, Versatile Artist. Islamabad: Idara Saqafat-e-Pakistan, 1984 OCLC 12811086 (Worldcat link)
- Ismaili, Mohammad. Gulgee (Lahore: Ferozsons, 2000) ISBN 969-0-01428-5
- Mitter, Partha. Indian art (Oxford History of Art) (Oxford: Oxford University Press, 2001) ISBN 0-19-284221-8 (This book deals with the history of art in the entire South Asian subcontinent, including what are today modern Pakistan and Bangladesh.)
- Naqvi, Akbar. Image and Identity: Fifty Years of Painting and Sculpture in Pakistan. (Karachi and New York: Oxford University Press, 1998).
