= Ali Imam (painter) =

Pakistani artist

- Born: 1924; Narsinghpur, Madhya Pradesh, British India
- Died: 23 May 2002 at age 78; Karachi, Pakistan
- Occupation: Painter artist
- Years active: 1967 – 2002
- Awards: Pride of Performance Award (1968); Tamgha-i-Imtiaz (Medal of Distinction) Award

Ali Imam or Syed Ali Imam (1924 – 23 May 2002) was an artist from Pakistan.

== Early life and career ==
Ali Imam was born in Narsinghpur, Madhya Pradesh in 1924. In the early 1940s, for education in Arts, he went to the Nagpur School of Art. Then he studied for 2 years at the Bombay-based 'J. J. School of Art'. After the independence of Pakistan in 1947, Ali Imam and some of his family migrated to Pakistan.

In Pakistan, he got involved with the Progressive Writers Movement and the Communist Party of Pakistan and paid a heavy price for it. He was imprisoned 3 times for his socialist views in the early 1950s. Before that, he had received his Bachelor of Arts degree in 1949 from the University of Punjab in Lahore, Pakistan.

In Lahore, he was also under constant police surveillance due to his political beliefs. So he decided to move to London and lived there for almost eleven years. In London, he studied art at Saint Martin's School of Art from 1959 to 1960 and at Hammersmith College of Art from 1962 to 1963. Upon returning from London, Imam founded the Indus Gallery in Karachi in 1971, still one of the major art galleries in Pakistan as of 2010. He took the name 'Indus Gallery' from the Indus River in Pakistan. This river had supported Mohenjo-Daro, one of the oldest settlements in South Asia, and a Unesco World Heritage Site.

Ali Imam set up the Indus Gallery to play a key role for art and artists of Pakistan. He once said in an interview, "I decided to come back to Pakistan and be helpful to those who are more gifted and more talented than me, and to create a climate of work where I could be a sort of guidance and help." His wife, Shahnaz, recalled that the Indus Gallery had become a hub of cultural activity in Karachi back in the 1970s. Some of the noted painter artists that participated in Indus Gallery exhibits included Sadequain and Ismail Gulgee.

He was an art critic, art promoter and an art educationist to many artists at the Indus Art Gallery in Karachi. He ran this gallery from 1971 to 2002. His wife runs the Indus Art Gallery as of 2010.

== Death and legacy ==
Ali Imam died of a heart attack on 23 May 2002 at Karachi. He left behind a wife, Shahnaz and two children. Spokespersons at many art galleries where he had been active for many years including Indus Valley School of Art and Architecture, Pakistan Art Institute and the Arts Council of Pakistan expressed sorrow over his death.

Salima Hashmi, a noted educationist of Pakistan and the daughter of Pakistan's renowned poet Faiz Ahmed Faiz said in an interview to a major English-language newspaper,"When I came back from England, where I had gone to study, I realized that through Indus Gallery, Ali Imam had taught people to appreciate art, enjoy art and, more importantly, buy art works".

== Awards and recognition ==
- Pride of Performance Award by the President of Pakistan in 1968
- Tamgha-i-Imtiaz (Medal of Excellence) award by the President of Pakistan
- In 2006, Pakistan Postal Services issued a series of postage stamps as a posthumous tribute to 'Ten Great Painters of Pakistan' including the stamp for Ali Imam (1924–2002).

== See also ==
- Sadequain
- Ismail Gulgee
- Zahoor ul Akhlaq
- Bashir Mirza
- Laila Shahzada
- Indus Valley School of Art and Architecture
