= Laila Shahzada =

Pakistani artist (1926–1994)

- Born: 1926; Littlehampton, West Sussex, England
- Died: 20 July 1994 (age 68); Islamabad, Pakistan
- Occupation: Painter Artist
- Years active: 1960-1994
- Known for: Paintings about the culture of Indus Valley civilization in Pakistan

Laila Shahzada (1926 – 20 July 1994) was a Pakistani abstract painter who lived and worked in Karachi, Pakistan.

== Biography ==
Laila Shahzada was born in Littlehampton, England in 1926. After completing her basic education in England, she decided to become a painter-artist and trained initially in England in drawing and watercolour. Later, she trained under the artist, Ahmed Saeed Nagi, in Karachi who taught her how to use oils. She held her first solo exhibition at the Arts Council of Pakistan, Karachi in 1960. Using artifacts of Indus Valley Civilization in Pakistan as models, she made a series of paintings reflecting the culture of this ancient civilization. These paintings were shown at an exhibit at Karachi in 1976. In 1986, she participated in a group show at the Shorouks International Gallery, Regent Street, London. A total of 60 to 70 paintings were done by her before her death. She was killed in a gas explosion at her studio on 20 July 1994.

== Personal life ==
Shahzada married twice in her life. She had a son and a daughter from the first marriage, Sohail and Shahien. After separation from her first husband, she was given custody of their son and the first husband got custody of their daughter. She remarried and had another son, Zahir, in the second marriage but could never emotionally get over the loss of her daughter, Shahien. Later, she did a painting titled Mother and child. Some friends and art critics said that the painting was a reflection of her own pain as a mother.

"Laila Shahzada was a sensitive, disturbed and powerful artist whose brush had immense flow and impact", said Naeem Tahir, director-general of the Pakistan National Council of Arts in 2005.

== Death ==
Laila Shahzada died in a gas explosion in her studio in Islamabad, Pakistan on 20 July 1994.

== Awards and recognition ==
- Tamgha-i-Imtiaz by the President of Pakistan in 1986
- Pride of Performance Award by the President of Pakistan in 1995.
- She was awarded the "Key to the City" of New York in 1975 — the only Pakistani to receive this award.
- To honor her work, a commemorative postage stamp was issued for her in 2006 by the Pakistan Postal Department
