= Pakistan Post =

Postal services of Pakistan

- Native name: پاکستان پوسٹ
- Formerly: Department of Post & Telegraph
- Type: State-owned enterprise
- Industry: Postal Service, Courier
- Founded: 14 August 1947; 79 years ago
- Headquarters: Aiwan-e-Sanat-o-Tijarat, G-8/4 Islamabad, Capital Territory, Pakistan 44000
- Number of locations: GPOs - 85, Sub Offices - 3109, Extradepartmental Post Office - 7142
- Key people: Aleem Khan (Federal Minister for Communications); Khurram Agha (Federal Secretary, Communications); Khalid Javed (Special Secretary, Communications); Samiullah Khan (Chairman & Director General)
- Products: Courier express services Freight forwarding services Logistics services
- Revenue: In financial year 2020-21 - PKR - 15.62 billion
- Number of employees: Sanctioned Posts (Permanent) - 28,866 Extradepartmental - 10,251
- Website: pakpost.gov.pk

Pakistan Post (Urdu: پاکستان پوسٹ) is a state enterprise which functions as Pakistan's primary and largest postal operator. 49,502 employees through a vehicle fleet of 5,000 operate traditional "to the door" service from more than 13,419 post offices across the country, servicing over 50 million people. Pakistan Post operates under the autonomous "Postal Services Management Board" to deliver a full range of delivery, logistics and fulfillment services to customers.

In addition to its traditional role, Pakistan Post also offers services such as Postal Life Insurance and Pakistan Post Savings Bank. It also operates services on behalf of the federal and provincial governments, by acting as a collection point for tax and utility bills.

== Digital Franchise Post Offices (DFPOs) ==
DFPOs are a relatively newer concept in Pakistan. Individual entrepreneurs are issued IDs by the Master Franchiser (Pakistan Post Foundation). They set up a franchise post office in their own location with their own investment. Until 27 April 2022 PPF has issued IDS to 3773 franchisees while 832 DFPOs have become functional.

== Financial Action Task Force (FATF) ==
In Mutual Evaluation Report (MER) 2019 Pakistan Post was mentioned in 13 observations. Since then the government has taken extensive steps to ensure FATF Compliance.

== History ==
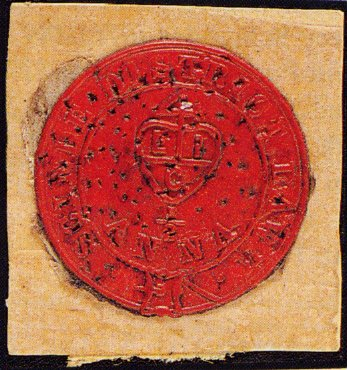
1st July 1852s Scinde Dawk stamp

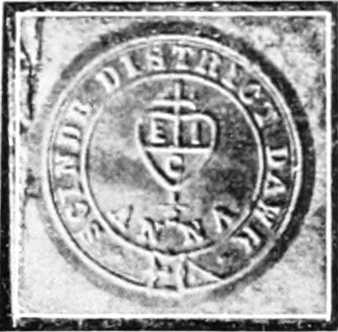
Scinde Half Anna

=== Middle ages ===
During the Mughul Empire and Samma dynasty, an early postal system developed along the banks of the Indus River in Sindh beginning in the 13th century. The system consisted of runners or "dak" (ڈاک) who would carry letters from one point to another and then hand it off to the next runner who would do the same. Runners were paid according to distance traveled and weight of the letters. The system extended from Thatta in the south, through Kotri and Hyderabad and as far north as Sukkur. The system later expanded into lower Punjab (Multan and Bahawalpur). Letters could be exchanged by over two dozen runners before they reached their destination.

=== British period (1843-1947) ===
On 17 February 1843, following the Battle of Miani, Sindh fell to the British followed by Punjab in 1845. Sir Bartle Frere became the Chief Commissioner of Sindh in 1850 and improved upon the postal system by introducing a cheap and standard rate for postage, independent of distance travelled. In 1851, runners were replaced with horses and camels which proved to be beneficial as it quickly and efficiently transported mail, connecting government offices and post offices. In 1855, the Scinde Railway began taking over most mail routes however camels and horses were still used in regions where the railway had not yet reached. By 1886, the North Western State Railway was responsible for transporting most mail up and down the country. The postal system by now had been expanded from Karachi in the south to as far north as Gilgit.

=== Post-Independence period (1947-present) ===
Pakistan Post was established following its independence from Britain under the modified Post Office Act VI, 1898 and became operation on 14 August 1947. Pakistan Post fell under the Department of Posts and Telegraph in the Ministry of Communications. The Office of the Postmaster General was established in Lahore. On 10 November 1947, Pakistan joined the Universal Postal Union as its 89th member. On 9 July 1948, Pakistan Post issued its first postage stamps, a set of four stamps commemorating the country's independence. In 1959, an "All-up-Airmail" scheme was introduced by which all letters were airlifted between stations on an air network. Sikorsky helicopters of Pakistan International Airlines were used to deliver mail within East Pakistan. In July 1962, the government bifurcated the old department and independently placed Pakistan Post under the Ministry of Communications. In January 1987, "Urgent Mail Service" was introduced in the country and in April 1987, "Local Packet & Parcel Service" was introduced. On 1 January 1988, five-digit postal codes were introduced nationwide. Between 1 August 1992 to 6 July 1996, the post office was separated from the Ministry of Communications and was made an independent corporation. From 1 December 1992, a new "Overseas Postal Circle" with its headquarters in Islamabad was launched, to streamline foreign mail. Prior to the Islamabad facility, all international mail was received and sent through Karachi. Between 2006 and 2007, mail was sent using 19 domestic airports including Chitral, Karachi, Lahore, Moenjodaro, Multan and Skardu. During the same period, four international airports were also used: Islamabad, Karachi, Lahore and Peshawar. In 2007, the Pakistan Post embarked on a new vision which included a logo change. On 3 November 2008, the department was placed under the postal division of the newly created Ministry of Postal Services. Senator Israr Ullah Zehri was appointed its first minister.

== Services ==
Pakistan Post is not merely confined to a number of postal services. Its areas of activities span on a larger scale. The national character, strong brand recognition and a wide network of post offices bestows a unique position to the Pakistan Post in playing a vital role in the economic and social development of Pakistan. It serves as the principal agency for the government in implementing key policies. Pakistan Post is providing a variety of services on behalf of many federal and provincial government departments. In December 2018, Federal Minister for Communication and Postal Services Murad Saeed launched the Pakistan Post Mobile Application.

=== Postal services ===
The following are postal services offered within the country.

1. Letter Mail (ordinary and registered)
2. Parcel Post (Inland and International)
3. Certificate of Posting
4. Post Office Boxes

Special Services

The following are special services with their date of commencement given in brackets. Not all services are provided in every post office.

1. Air Express (Airex) (2 August 1986)
2. Fax Mail Service (FMS) (1 August 1988)
3. Fax Money Order Service (FMOS) (15 August 1988)
4. International Speed Post (ISP) (formerly known as Datapost™) (1 September 1986)
5. Local Express Delivery (LES) (formerly known as Local Packet & Parcel Service) (22 April 1987)
6. Postal Draft Service (15 November 1987)
7. Postal Giro Service (15 March 1988)
8. Savings Bank Mobile Account (12 January 1988)
9. Urgent Mail Service (UMS) (1 January 1987)
10. Urgent Money Order Service (UMOS) (15 April 1988)
11. EMOS (Electronic Money Order Service).
12. Pakistan Post starts collecting utility bills from home (June 2007)

=== Federal services ===
1. Collection of taxes: income and withholding (on NSS profit payment)
2. Collection of Customs Duty and Sales Tax (on foreign postal articles)
3. Delivery of Computerised National Identity Cards (CNIC)
4. Disbursement of welfare/financial assistance
5. Food Support Programme
6. Payment to Pakistan Armed Forces Pensioners
7. Sale of Highway and Motorway Safety books

=== Government owned businesses ===
1. Cash Management services for Khushali Bank
2. Collection of utility bills including electricity: WAPDA, LESCO, IESCO, PESCO, HESCO, MESCO, QESCO, and K-Electric; natural gas: Sui Southern Gas Company and Sui Northern Gas Pipelines Ltd; regional WASAs, and telephone: PTCL including Ufone/former Telenor
3. Delivery of NTN Certificates
4. Payment to Capital Development Authority (CDA) Pensioners
5. Payment to Pakistan Telecommunication Company Ltd (PTCL) Pensioners
6. Sale of PTCL/Ufone phonecards
7. Sale of Agricultural Loan Pass Books
8. Sale of Postal Life Insurance
9. Disburbursement of Zarai Taraqiyati Bank Ltd (ZTBL) staff pensions
10. Verification of winning Prize Bonds
11. Collection of State Life Insurance Corporation of Pakistan insurance premiums

=== Provincial services ===
1. Renewal of Arms Licences
2. Renewal of Driving Licences
3. Sale of Route Permit Fee stamps
4. Sale of Motor Vehicle Fitness stamps
5. Motor Vehicle Tax Collection
6. Renewal of Liquor Possession and Consumption Permit

=== Private enterprise ===
The following are services provided in partnership with private enterprise.

- With BISP: Payment to over 2.2 million beneficiaries of Benazir Income Support Programme (at GPOs and Post Offices throughout Pakistan)
- With The First MicroFinanceBank Ltd – Pakistan (FMFB-P): microfinance services through post offices.
- Cash Management and Courier Services for Citibank

== Training ==
In 1987, the post office established a Postal Staff College in Islamabad to provide training to its employees in various fields. Over the years it has also imparted training to employees of 57 other postal services including Albania, Cambodia, Fiji, Kenya, Maldives, Nepal, Trinidad and Tobago and Zambia. It also has 5 regional training centres at Islamabad, Karachi, Lahore, Nowshera and Quetta.

On 26 October 2015, in an interview to the media, "A Pakistan Post official told the media that a new, comprehensive plan to revitalise the department had been chalked out, including staff training, electronic money transfer and tracking facilities etc. The aim is to bring the entity up to international standards of customer satisfaction."

On 15 October 2013, the Economic Cooperation Organization (ECO) of 10 member nations from Asia and Europe, in its 20th meeting at Baku, Azerbaijan decided to establish the "ECO Postal Staff College" at Islamabad, Pakistan to help train postal services staff for the 10 member nations. The 10 member nations were Afghanistan, Azerbaijan, Iran, Kazakhstan, Kyrgyzstan, Pakistan, Tajikistan, Turkey, Turkmenistan and Uzbekistan.

In 2016, "Pakistan has been re-elected to the Council of Administration (CA) in the Universal Postal Union (UPU), the main decision-making body of the United Nations specialised agency responsible for the development and cooperation of International Postal Service."

== Post offices ==
Post offices in Pakistan by Fiscal Year (July to June):

| Fiscal Year | Urban | Rural | Total |
|---|---|---|---|
| 1990–1991 | 1,867 | 11,546 | 13,413 |
| 1991–1992 | 1,909 | 11,471 | 13,380 |
| 1992–1993 | 1,983 | 11,213 | 13,196 |
| 1993–1994 | 1,970 | 11,315 | 13,285 |
| 1994–1995 | 2,026 | 11,294 | 13,320 |
| 1995–1996 | 2,092 | 11,327 | 13,419 |
| 1996–1997 | 2,024 | 11,192 | 13,216 |
| 1997–1998 | 2,044 | 11,250 | 13,294 |
| 1998–1999 | 2,103 | 10,751 | 12,854 |
| 1999–2000 | 2,103 | 10,751 | 12,854 |
| 2000–2001 | 2,302 | 9,932 | 12,267 |
| 2001–2002 | 1,983 | 10,284 | 12,267 |
| 2002–2003 | 1,808 | 10,446 | 12,254 |
| 2003–2004 | 2,267 | 9,840 | 12,107 |
| 2004–2005 | 1,831 | 10,499 | 12,330 |
| 2005–2006 | 1,845 | 10,494 | 12,339 |
| 2006–2007 | 1,845 | 10,494 | 12,339 |

== Revenue ==
This is a chart of trend of incomes of Pakistan Post from diversified public services such as post, parcels, banking, and insurance, with figures in millions of Pakistani Rupees.

| Year | Revenue (in millions ₨) | Profit/(Loss) |
|---|---|---|
| 1947 | 10 | (4) |
| 1950 | 32 | (3) |
| 1955 | 40 | (3) |
| 1960 | 65 | 6 |
| 1965 | 98 | 1 |
| 1970 | 91 | (12) |
| 1975 | 197 | (28) |
| 1980 | 361 | (69) |
| 1985 | 630 | (151) |
| 1990 | 1,214 | (176) |
| 1995 | 2,045 | (471) |
| 2000 | 3,281 | 270 |
| 2005 | 4,830 | 20 |
| 2017 | 8,000 | - |
| 2018 | 14,000 | - |
| 2019 | - | (10000) |
| 2020 | - | - |
| 2021 | - | - |

== See also ==
- Postage stamps and postal history of Pakistan
- Postal Orders of Pakistan
- List of Postal Codes of Pakistan
- List of people on stamps of Pakistan
