= Farooq Qaiser =

Pakistani artist (1945–2021)

- فاروق قیصر
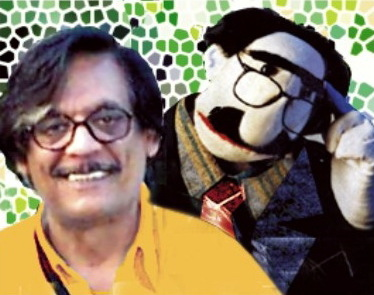
- Farooq Qaiser with his puppet Uncle Sargam
- Born: Farooq Qaiser; 31 October 1945; Sialkot, Punjab, British India
- Died: 14 May 2021 (aged 75); Islamabad, Pakistan
- Occupations: TV director, journalist, puppeteer, writer, columnist, cartoonist
- Known for: Uncle Sargam (creator)
- Awards: Pride of Performance award by the President of Pakistan (1993); Sitara-e-Imtiaz (Star of Excellence) award by the President of Pakistan (2021)

Farooq Qaiser (Punjabi, Urdu: فاروق قیصر; 31 October 1945 – 14 May 2021) was a Pakistani artist, newspaper columnist, TV show director, puppeteer, script writer, and voice actor.

He was known as the creator of the puppet characters Uncle Sargam and Masi Museebtay, introduced in 1976 in children's television show Kaliyan. Farooq was also a cartoonist, newspaper columnist and wrote for the newspaper Daily Nai Baat in Lahore and under the pen name "Meethay Karelay" (English: "Sweet bitter gourd").

== Early life and education ==
Farooq Qaiser was born on 31 October 1945 in a Muslim family in Sialkot, Punjab. He spent his early childhood in Peshawar and Kohat, Khyber Pakhtunkhwa. In 1970, he graduated with a Bachelor of Arts degree in Fine Arts from the National College of Arts (NCA), Lahore. In 1976, he received a master's degree in Graphic Arts from Bucharest, Romania, and also trained for puppetry there. He also received his master's degree in Mass Communication in 1999 from the University of Southern California, School for Communication and Journalism, United States.

== Career ==
Qaiser started his career in the early 1970s after graduating from the National College of Arts, Lahore, with a short documentary in the English language. In 1971, his teacher Salima Hashmi got him involved in her children's television puppet show Akkar Bakkar. In that show, he worked with Shoaib Hashmi, Muneeza Hashmi and Faiz Ahmad Faiz on the scripts and puppets. The show was intended to be Pakistan's version of the American entertainment and educational show Sesame Street. His first assignment on the show was to create a local version of the Big Bird, after which he went on to create many other characters for the program.

In 1976, Qaiser directed and wrote his own puppet show Kaliyan (Flower Buds) which was broadcast on the national television network, Pakistan Television (PTV). He created his own fictional puppet characters for the show, including Uncle Sargam, Haiga and Maasi Museebte. He also was the voice of Uncle Sargam. He created the character Uncle Sargam in resemblance of his teacher Molnar from Romania. The character went on to be a household name in Pakistan for many decades. Speaking about the character, Qaiser said, "he has the same insecurities and fears of every middle class Pakistani. He could say things that a common man wanted to express but could not say".

Some of his other television shows included Putli Tamasha and Sargam Time. Qaiser also worked at the Lahore-based Urdu daily newspaper Daily Nai Baat as a cartoonist. He was also a newspaper columnist at the same newspaper and wrote under the pen name Meethay Karelay. He taught for sometime at the Fatima Jinnah Women University in Rawalpindi.

He served on the board of governors at the National Institute of Folk and Traditional Heritage (Lok Virsa), in Islamabad, Pakistan, in 2015. He was a recipient of the Presidential Pride of Performance in 1993. He also served in India as a member of UNESCO, providing educational services for two years.

== Personal life and death ==
Qaiser was married and had a son. He died on 14 May 2021, in Islamabad from a heart attack.

== Works ==
=== Books ===
- Hor Puchho
- Kaalam Galoch
- Meethay Karelay
- Meray Piyaray Allah Mian

=== Characters ===
- Uncle Sargam
- Masi Museebatay
- Haiga
- Sharmeeli
- Rolla

=== Television shows ===
- Kaliyan (1976) – Pakistan Television
- Sargam Time, (1984-1986)
- Daak Time (1993) – NTM
- Siyasi Kaliyan (1995) – Pakistan Television
- Sargam (2010) – Dawn News

== Awards and recognition ==
- Pride of Performance Award by the President of Pakistan in 1993
- 9th PTV Awards for Writer Special Award in 1998
- Sitara-e-Imtiaz awarded by the President of Pakistan on March 23, 2021, for his unmatched performance and contribution towards the entertainment industry of Pakistan for over 4 decades.
- Lifetime Achievement Award from Pakistan Television (PTV) (2010).
- Master Puppeteer award from UNICEF (1997) for the 2500 live performances around Pakistan.
- His 78th birthday was celebrated by Google on Google Doodle.
