= Mira Hashmi =

Pakistani actress (born 1976)

- Born: 2 October 1976 (age 50); Lahore, Punjab, Pakistan
- Education: Concordia University
- Occupations: Actress, host, director
- Years active: 1995–present
- Children: 2
- Parent(s): Shoaib Hashmi (father); Salima Hashmi (mother)
- Relatives: Yasser Hashmi (brother); Faiz Ahmad Faiz (grandfather); Alys Faiz (grandmother); Adeel Hashmi (cousin); Ali Hashmi (cousin); Muneeza Hashmi (aunt); Moneeza Hashmi (aunt); Humair Hashmi (uncle)

Mira Hashmi (born 2 October 1976) is a Pakistani actress, host and director. She is known for her roles in dramas Teen Bata Teen, Taamak Toyian and Family Front.

== Early life ==
Mira was born in 1976 in Lahore, Pakistan. She completed her studies and did an MPhil in Cultural Studies from National College of Arts in Lahore. Later she went to Concordia University in Canada and did a major in film production.

== Career ==
Mira made her debut as an actress in 1995 on PTV, where she appeared in a number of dramas. She appeared in dramas Anteena Washing Powder, Taamak Toyian and Kausar Ka Dastarkhwan. She also appeared in dramas Katauti and Teen Bata Teen. After that she appeared in comedy drama Family Front as Huma; her role was praised by her co-stars Saba Hameed and Naseem Vicky.

== Personal life ==
Mira is married and has two children. Mira's father Shoaib Hashmi was an actor and her mother is a painter Salima Hashmi. Both her grandparents Faiz Ahmad Faiz and Alys Faiz were poets. Her aunt Muneeza Hashmi is a producer, and her cousin Adeel Hashmi is an actor.

== Filmography ==
=== Television ===
Year	Title	Role	Network
1995	Teen Bata Teen	Mehreen	PTV
1996	Anteena Washing Powder	Sakina	PTV
1997	Family Front	Huma	PTV
1998	Taamak Toyian	Safeena	PTV
1998	Katauti	Faiza	PTV
1999	Kausar Ka Dastarkhwan	Kausar	PTV
2000	Articulation	Herself	PTV
2015	Weekend World With Sophiya	Herself	PTV
2016	Mahira Khan in Conversation With Sarmad Khoosat & Mira Hashmi	Herself	Electronic Dairy
2018	Faiz Festival	Herself	Electronic Dairy
2019	Salt Arts	Herself	Samaa TV
2019	Mahira Khan in Conversation With Sarmad Khoosat & Mira Hashmi	Herself	Electronic Diary

== Bibliography ==
Mira also authored a critically acclaimed book titled Gulzar's Ijaazat: Insights Into the Film in 2019 in memory of her grandfather Faiz Ahmad Faiz and dedicated to Faiz Festival. The same year she wrote another book titled Three Classic Films by Gulzar: Insights Into the Films co-authored with Saba Mahmood Bashir and Sathya Saran.
