= Jocelyn Ortt-Saeed =

Australian-Pakistani poet (1935–2014)

- Born: Jocelyn-Ann Ortt; 18 January 1935; Brisbane, Queensland, Australia
- Died: 26 September 2014 (aged 79); Lahore, Punjab, Pakistan
- Occupations: Poet; social worker
- Writing career
- Language: English

Jocelyn Ortt-Saeed (18 January 1935 – 26 September 2014) was an Australian-Pakistani poet, philosopher and social worker. She is listed in the poetry's World Who's Who and was the subject of the documentary film Punjabi Love Story.

== Personal life ==
Jocelyn Ortt-Saeed was born on 18 January 1935 in Brisbane, Australia, and received her education in Australia and Germany. She married her Pakistani husband Muhammad Saeed, a sugar mill technologist based in Jaranwala, in 1959 in Karachi while she was traveling to Germany for studies. They had six children.

Although Ortt-Saeed was raised a Christian, she was married to a Muslim and their children were exposed to both cultures as part of their upbringing. They spoke both English and Urdu at home.

== Literary career ==
Ortt-Saeed published seven poetry collections. Her last major work was Distant Horizons. She was also a regular writer for the English-language newspaper Dawn, where she would contribute poems and verses. She had an interest in Sufi poetry, particularly the works of Bulleh Shah, and frequently attended poetry events throughout Pakistan. Ortt-Saeed's work has been praised by various writers including Madeeha Gauhar and Shahid Nadeem. She was a close friend of the English-born poet Alys Faiz, who was the wife of the renowned Urdu writer Faiz Ahmed Faiz.

== Social work ==
She was a veteran member of the Human Rights Commission of Pakistan and Faiz Ghar. Along with her daughter Mariyam, she supported the Centre for Inspiration and Creativity in Lahore which promoted women's empowerment activities. As a fluent speaker of German, she remained associated with the Goethe-Institut in Lahore, where she was a pianist. She was known for her community work and medical aid to women and children in the rural areas of Pakistan.

== Death ==
Ortt-Saeed was diagnosed with cancer and died on 26 September 2014, at the age of 79. Her funeral was held at the Lahore Cathedral, and attended by Muneeza Hashmi and Fakir Aijazuddin among others, followed by a dua held the following day. She was laid to rest at the Jail Road cemetery in Lahore.
