= Humaira Ali =

Pakistani actress (1960–2025)

- حمیرا علی
- Born: Humaira Chaudhry; 5 April 1960; Lahore, West Pakistan, Pakistan
- Died: 3 May 2025 (aged 65); Lahore, Punjab, Pakistan
- Education: University of Lahore
- Occupations: Actress; Singer
- Years active: 1973–2025
- Spouse: Abid Ali (m. 1976; div. 2006)
- Children: 3

Humaira Ali (née Chaudhry; 5 April 1960 – 3 May 2025) was a Pakistani actress and singer. She was known for her roles in dramas Nail Polish, Kankar, Jab We Wed and Sammi. She also acted in Pakistan's only English-language film, Beyond the Last Mountain (1976).

== Early life ==
Humaira was born on 5 April 1960 in Lahore, Pakistan. She completed her studies at the University of Lahore.

== Career ==
Ali joined the television industry in 1973. She made her debut as an actress on the hit PTV drama serial Jhok Siyal, playing a lead role along with Abid Ali, whom she later married. Humaira also sang songs in Jhok Sial and in the dramas directed by her husband Abid.

In 1974, she appeared in the lead role as Batool in Aik Mohabbat So Afsanay which was written by Ashfaq Ahmed and she starred with Sheeba Hassan, Khursheed Shahid and Mustansar Hussain Tarar. She portrayed the role of a kind and sweet housewife who is deeply hurt when she learns that her husband married another girl in a foreign country.

In 1976, she worked in Pakistan's first English film, Beyond the Last Mountain, in which she portrayed a bride who marries someone she does not know and later faces some problems. It was directed and written by Javed Jabbar; later, it was shown at the 6th International Film Festival of India in Delhi.

She was known for singing in the dramas Dasht, Doosra Aasman and Hawa Pe Raqs which was also directed by her husband.

Thereafter she appeared in numerous dramas, including Akbari Asghari, Sabz Pari Laal Kabootar, Nail Polish, Kankar, Jab We Wed, Ranjish Hi Sahi and Sammi.

== Personal life and death ==
Humaira married Abid Ali in 1976. They met during the shooting of the drama Johak Sial. They had three daughters, including Iman Ali and Rahma Ali. She and Abid Ali divorced in 2006; she still used his last name and both remained on good terms until his death in 2019.

Humaira Ali died on 3 May 2025, at the age of 65.

== Filmography ==
=== Television ===
Year	Title	Role	Network
1973	Jhok Siyal	Mehru	PTV
1974	Aik Mohabbat So Afsanay	Batool	PTV
1993	Dasht	Shahtaaj	NTM
2005	Azal	Begum Ahsan	Indus TV
2007	Lahori Gate	Kulsoom	PTV
2007	Awaz	Suraiya Begum	PTV
2008	Yaad Piya ki Aaye	Abida	PTV
2010	Din Dhallay	Sidra	PTV
2010	Jeevan Ki Rahon Mein	Minal	PTV
2010	Bas Ik Tera Intezar	Safeena	PTV
2010	40 Plus Is Naughty Plus	Beenish's mother	PTV
2010	Dastaan	Kaamini	Hum TV
2011	Nail Polish	Nafeesa Mehboob	A-Plus
2011	Akbari Asghari	Batool	Hum TV
2011	Sehra Teri Pyas	Ameer Bibi	PTV Home
2011	Timmy G Season 1	Nusrat	ARY Digital
2012	Mere Huzoor	Nain Tara's mother	Express Entertainment
2012	Koi Meray Dil Say Pouchay	Shireen	PTV
2012	Ghar To Akhir Apna Hay	Begum Sahiba	PTV
2012	Timmy G Season 2	Nusrat	ARY Digital
2012	Bano Bazar	Bibi	Geo TV
2012	Wilyti Desi	Shamshad Begum	PTV
2012	Dil Deke Jayen Ge	Maham's mother	Geo TV
2012	Sabz Pari Laal Kabootar	Nasima	Geo Entertainment
2013	Pachtawa	Nuzhat	ARY Digital
2013	Kankar	Aapa	Hum TV
2013	Yeh Shadi Nahi Ho Sakti	Chami	ARY Zindagi
2013	Darmiyan	Farishtay's mother	ARY Digital
2013	Ranjish Hi Sahi	Hira	Geo Entertainment
2014	Haq Meher	Sultana	ARY Digital
2014	Jab We Wed	Heer's mother	Urdu 1
2014	Behnein Aisi Bhi Hoti Hain	Akhtari	ARY Zindagi
2014	Rasam	Yasmeen	Geo TV
2014	Shikwa	Tamanna Khanam	ARY Digital
2015	Ek Sitam Aur Sahi	Zawar Gul	Express Entertainment
2015	Shukrana	Imtiaz	Express Entertainment
2015	Mohabbat Aag Si	Samiya's mother	Hum TV
2015	Yehi Hai Zindagi	Nain Tara	Express Entertainment
2015	Paras	Sabeen	Geo Entertainment
2016	Lagaao	Nadra	Hum TV
2016	Yehi Hai Zindagi Season 2	Nain Tara	Express Entertainment
2016	Hassil	Junaid's mother	Geo TV
2017	Thori Si Wafa	Farzana	Hum TV
2017	Yehi Hai Zindagi Season 3	Nain Tara	Express Entertainment
2017	Bachay Baraye Farokht	Shazia's mother	Urdu 1
2017	Sammi	Nargis Jutt	Hum TV
2017	Massom	Aruba's mother	Express Entertainment
2017	Beti To Main Bhi Hoon	Qudsia	Urdu 1
2017	Yeh Shadi Nahin Hosakti	Shehla	ARY Zindagi
2018	Bay Parwaian	Sultana Bibi	PTV
2018	Rabbaway	Khalida	Bol Entertainment
2018	Bol Kaffara	Liaquat's mother	Bol Entertainment
2019	Gulfam	Samreen	ATV

=== Telefilm ===
Year	Title	Role
2012	Roshni Ki Dastak	Ani
2016	Shab-e-Zulmat	Beena's mother

=== Film ===
Year	Title	Role
1976	Beyond the Last Mountain	Bride
2011	Bol	Marriage Bureau Lady
2012	Iffat-e-Maab	Anjuman's aunt
2022	Tich Button	Parveen
TBA	Kambakht	TBA
