= Sabz Pari Laal Kabootar =

Pakistani television series

- Genre: Family drama Social drama
- Written by: Amna Mufti
- Directed by: Babar Javed; Furqan Khan
- Starring: Faysal Qureshi; Nimra Bucha; Mohib Mirza
- Country of origin: Pakistan
- Original language: Urdu
- No. of episodes: 28

Production
- Producers: Asif Raza Mir; Babar Javed
- Running time: Approx 40 Minutes
- Production company: A&B Entertainment

Original release
- Network: Geo Entertainment
- Release: 11 June – 23 December 2012

Sabz Pari Laal Kabootar (Urdu: سبز پری لال کبوتر, lit. 'Green Fairy, Red Pigeon') is a Pakistani social drama serial directed by Babar Javed and Furqan Khan, produced by A&B Entertainment. The drama stars Faysal Qureshi, Nimra Bucha, Mohib Mirza and Sami Khan in lead roles, and was first aired on 11 June till 23 December 2012 on Geo Entertainment every Monday at 8:00 p.m. The series, written by Amna Mufti, delves into the lives of Karachi's poor class, exploring dark themes such as the Pir mafia, drug addiction, and other heinous crimes associated with it.

== Plot ==
Rafiq lives with his wife Sakina and young children, in a lower class family and is a rickshaw driver. He uses drugs and has become addicted to them. His urge for drugs takes him to such a desperate state that he even sacrifices his children for it.

== Cast ==
- Faysal Qureshi as Rafiq
- Mohib Mirza as Anjay
- Sami Khan as Shafiq
- Nimra Bucha as Sakina
- Zhalay Sarhadi as Najma
- Sarmad Khoosat as Arham
- Arij Fatyma as Maleeha
- Tahira Imam as Arham's mother
- Humaira Ali as Nasima
- Sohail Masood as Police Inspector
- Sajid Shah
