= Jhok Siyal =

Pakistani television series

- Original title: جھوک سیال
- Based on: Jhok Siyal by Shabbir Hussain
- Written by: Munnu Bhai
- Directed by: Yawar Hayat Khan
- Starring: Bindiya; Badi Uzzaman; Abid Ali; Humaira Ali; Salim Nasir
- Country of origin: Pakistan
- Original language: Urdu

Production
- Producer: Yawar Hayat Khan
- Camera setup: Multi-camera

Original release
- Release: 1973 – 1973

Jhok Siyal is a Pakistani television series first broadcast on Pakistan Television Corporation in 1973. It was based on a novel by Shabbir Shah, with screenplay written by Munnu Bhai, and direction by Yawar Hayat Khan. The series was the on-screen debut of Abid Ali, who played the leading role in the series. Set in rural Punjab, the series revolves around feudalism.

The series is considered as a revolutionary classic, due to its scale and the themes it touched upon, such as poverty, economic inequality and exploitation of the poor.

== Cast ==
- Bindiya
- Badi Uzzaman
- Abid Ali
- Humaira Ali
- Salim Nasir
- Abdul Razzak Tajwani
