= Bindiya Ke Bahubali (TV series) =

- Genre: Action; Comedy; Drama
- Created by: Raj Amit Kumar
- Written by: Raj Amit Kumar; Sankalp Rawal; Damon J. Taylor
- Directed by: Raj Amit Kumar
- Starring: Saurabh Shukla; Ranvir Shorey; Seema Biswas; Sheeba Chaddha; Tannishtha Chatterjee; Sushant Singh
- Country of origin: India
- Original language: Hindi
- No. of seasons: 2
- No. of episodes: 12

Production
- Producers: Ninad Raikar; Sumeet Mishra; Gautam Talwar
- Production location: India
- Cinematography: Mohna Krishna Agapu; John Jacob Payyapalli; Harsh Waghdhare; Mustafa Shabbir
- Editor: Chandrashekhar Prajapati
- Running time: 35–50 min
- Production company: Amazon MX Player

Original release
- Network: MX Player
- Release: 8 August 2025 – present

Bindiya Ke Bahubali is 2025 Indian Hindi-language OTT series written and directed by Raj Amit Kumar and starring Saurabh Shukla, Ranvir Shorey, Seema Biswas, and Sheeba Chaddha.

Season II of the series was premiered on 21 January 2026. Both seasons can be watched for free on Amazon MX Player.

== Premise ==
Bindiya Ke Bahubali explores the aftermath of a mafia don's arrest during an election campaign. Based in fictional town of Bindiya, somewhere in Bihar, India, a volatile battle over legacy and power is ignited when Bada Davan of Davan family (Saurabh Shukla) is detained, and his ambitious son, Chhote Davan (Ranvir Shorey) attempts to seize control. The rest is the huge interplay between various members of this family and the outside world.

== Cast ==
- Saurabh Shukla as Badaa Davan
- Ranvir Shorey as Chhota Davan
- Seema Biswas as Sanka Davan
- Sheeba Chaddha as Dharavi
- Alok Pandey as Babban
- Tannishtha Chatterjee as Imali Davan
- Sushant Singh as DSP Murli Majhi
- Sai Tamhankar as Ajji Davan
- Vineet Kumar as Chacha Davan
- Aakash Dahiya as Kisna Davan
- Govind Namdeo as Angad Singh
- Kranti Prakash Jha as Babu Davan
- Kallirroi Tziafeta as Sasha
- Anil Rastogi as Judge

== Release ==
The series was released on Amazon MX Player on 8 August 2025.

Season II of the series was premiered on 21 January 2026.
