= Unfreedom =

2014 Indian film

- English-language poster of the film
- Directed by: Raj Amit Kumar
- Written by: Raj Amit Kumar; Damon J Taylor
- Produced by: Raj Amit Kumar
- Starring: Victor Banerjee; Adil Hussain; Bhanu Uday; Preeti Gupta; Bhavani Lee; Ankur Vikal; Seema Rahmani; Samrat Chakrabarti
- Cinematography: Hari Nair
- Edited by: Atanu Mukherjee
- Music by: Wayne Sharpe; Jesse Kotansky
- Production companies: Dark Frames; 69 Productions
- Release dates: December 2014 (Kerala International Film Festival); 29 May 2015
- Running time: 103 minutes
- Countries: United States; India
- Languages: English; Hindi

Unfreedom: Blemished light (Hindi title: Dagh Ujala) is a 2014 Indian drama film by Raj Amit Kumar, which was released in North America on 29 May 2015. Faiz Ahmad Faiz's poem, "Ye Dagh Dagh Ujala", is the inspiration behind the film. The film stars Victor Banerjee, Adil Hussain, Preeti Gupta.

The story revolves around a Muslim fundamentalist in New York who kidnaps a liberal Muslim scholar with an intent to kill, while a closeted lesbian in New Delhi kidnaps her bisexual lover with the intent of being together. The resulting torture and violence lead to a brutal struggle of identities against "unfreedom".

In India, the Central Board of Film Certification (CBFC) refused to certify the movie for public release in India.

== Cast ==
- Victor Banerjee as Fareed Rahmani
- Adil Hussain as Devraj Singh, Leela's police officer father
- Bhanu Uday as Hussain
- Preeti Gupta as Leela Singh
- Bhavani Lee as Sakhi Taylor
- Ankur Vikal as Najeeb
- Seema Rahmani as Chandra
- Samrat Chakrabarti as Anees
- Danae Nason as Jana
- Andrew Platner as Mitch
- Danny Boushebel as Malik
- Dilip Shankar as Sameer
- Alyy Khan as Alyy
- Kuldeep Sareen as Janaka
- Jatin Sarna as Janaka's Officer
- Shayan Munshi as Anand, Sakhi's beau
- Swaroopa Ghosh as Eiravati
- Yash Kansara as young Hussain
- Rayvin Disla as Jordan
- John Castaldo as Morris
- Nalin Singh as Jishnu
- Bubbales Sabharwal as Dr Malik
- Nikki Chawla as Alvina, Hussain's mother
- Kedarnath as Fiamanullah
- Sudeep Solanki as Jimmy, art buyer
- Darlene Heller as Jessica
- Sachin Verma as Hiresh
- Manoj Bakshi as Prithu
- Vanya Joshi as Ujas

== Production ==
Hari Nair is the cinematographer of the film with Wayne Sharpe and Jesse Kotansky composing the soundtrack. Resul Pookutty did the sound design. Deepa Bajaj, who also was the post-production producer, worked on the publicity campaign and distribution of the film.

== Censorship ==
In India, the film was refused certification by the CBFC Examining Committee. A revising committee of the Censor Board proposed cuts to the director, Raj Amit Kumar. He refused and appealed against the CBFC's demand for cuts to the Government of India's Film Certification Appellate Tribunal (FCAT). In response to his appeal, the authorities completely banned the film regardless of cuts. The news of the ban gained widespread coverage in the media.

In a video released on April 9, 2015 on YouTube, Raj Amit Kumar states that the Censor Board should rate or certify a movie, instead of banning and offering cuts. He also said that he would keep sending signed petitions to the Prime Minister of India and Censor Board, until there is a real change. The director is seeking support from people who believe in freedom of speech.
