= Muneeza Hashmi =

TV executive from Pakistan (born 1946)

- منیزہ ہاشمی
- Born: Muneeza Ahmed; 1946 (age 79–80); Shimla, Punjab, British India
- Other name: Moneeza Hashmi
- Education: Kinnaird College for Women; University of the Punjab; University of Hawaii
- Occupations: Television producer; Actress; Broadcaster; Writer
- Years active: 1967 – present
- Spouse: Humair Hashmi (husband)
- Children: Ali Madeeh Hashmi (son); Adeel Omer Hashmi (son)
- Parent(s): Faiz Ahmad Faiz (father); Alys Faiz (mother)
- Relatives: Salima Hashmi (sister); Mira Hashmi (niece); Tufail Ahmed (uncle); Shoaib Hashmi (brother-in-law)
- Awards: Pride of Performance Award (2003) by the President of Pakistan

Muneeza Hashmi (Urdu: منیزہ ہاشمی; born 1946) is a broadcaster, television producer, actress and a former general manager and director programmes of the Pakistan Television Corporation (PTV). Hashmi has over four decades of experience working with public media.

She is the Trustee of Faiz Foundation Trust, Pakistan and main organizer of Faiz Festival Lahore. She is the younger daughter of the prominent Pakistani poet Faiz Ahmed Faiz.

== Early life and education ==
Muneeza was born in 1946, in before-the-partition Shimla, British India to parents Faiz Ahmed Faiz and Alys Faiz. She is the younger sister of Salima Hashmi, a painter and actress. Her mother, Alys Faiz, was a sister of Christobel Taseer, mother of Salman Taseer, the former Governor of Punjab, Pakistan.

Muneeza, as a child, migrated with her family to Lahore during the partition of India in 1947 and was raised in Lahore.

She received her early education from Kinnaird College for Women, and her Master's from University of the Punjab. She completed her second Master's degree in Education from the University of Hawaii, USA in 1981.

== Career ==
Hashmi started work at the Pakistan Television Corporation (PTV) in 1967 as an assistant producer. She also worked in TV dramas in the 1970s written by Ashfaq Ahmed and Bano Qudsia and she was director programmes at PTV at the time of her retirement from the state-run broadcaster.

In 1976, she worked in Pakistan's first English film, Beyond the Last Mountain, in which she portrayed the role of a family friend. It was directed and written by Javed Jabbar; later, it was shown at the 6th International Film Festival of India in Delhi.

In 1993, she worked in drama Paani Per Likha Tha which was written by Haseena Moin it aired on PTV and she portrayed the role of Aliya a human rights activist.

In 1998, she was promoted to the position of the General Manager of Lahore PTV station.

Hashmi was thrice elected President of the board of the Commonwealth Broadcasting Association, United Kingdom. Later, she returned as board president when the CBA rebranded itself as the Public Media Alliance.

She was appointed to hold the inaugural Benazir Bhutto Chair for Peace, Reconciliation and Development at the Lahore College for Women University in 2013.

In August 2019, Hashmi became the chairperson of the board of governors of the Lahore Arts Council. She is the first woman to hold the board chair.

In 2025, she was cast in a web series Fruit Chaat in which she portrayed the role of a mother figure to a girl who has a disability problem later she starts her own business it aired on ZEE5.

== Personal life ==
Muneeza Hashmi was born to Faiz Ahmad Faiz and Alys Faiz in 1946. She has an older sister, Salima Hashmi, who is an acclaimed artist, educator, and activist.

She married Humair Hashmi and has two sons, Dr. Ali Madeeh Hashmi, a psychiatrist and writer and Adeel Hashmi, an actor, producer, and screenwriter.

While Muneeza's notable and politically active father Faiz Ahmad Faiz was very busy or jailed, Muneeza stated about her mother raising her:

"I grew up in an atmosphere where there was an absentee father, and the whole responsibility of bringing up the kids was on the shoulders of my mother. My mother acted as the 'roof and support' to keep the family together. In Pakistan, family generates more bonding as compared to the west. I got the support from my family throughout my life".

Faiz's other daughter Salima Hashmi described her father Faiz as a 'pushover' and emotionally supportive to her and Muneeza because their mother Alys 'kept them in line and ran a very tight ship'.

== Filmography ==
=== Television series ===
Year	Title	Role	Network
1973	Taal Matol	Various	PTV
1974	Makoos Raabtey	Angie	PTV
1996	Paani Per Likha Tha	Aliya	PTV

=== Web series ===
Year	Title	Role	Network
2025	Fruit Chaat	Madame	ZEE5

=== Film ===
Year	Title	Role	Language
1976	Beyond the Last Mountain	Friend	English

== Awards and honours ==
- Pride of Performance award by the President of Pakistan in 2003 for excellence in art.
- She was awarded the Japanese broadcaster NHK's President of NHK Prize for "outstanding achievements in educational media".
- "Hashmi was also awarded the NHK Prize for her role in women empowerment and raising human rights awareness".

== Bibliography ==
Hashmi's collection of interviews of notable Pakistani women, Kaun Hoon Main? (English: Who Am I?), was published in 2014 by the Sang-e-Meel. In May 2022, she published Conversations with my Father: Forty Years on, a Daughter Responds, a collection of letters her father wrote to her four decades ago.
