= Kallirroi Tziafeta =

Greek actress

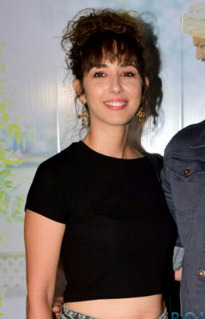
- Kallirroi in 2017
- Born: 6 June 1989 (age 37); Athens, Greece
- Education: Bachelor of Arts, University of Athens
- Occupation: Actress
- Years active: 2015–present
- Known for: Made in Heaven, Bindiya Ke Bahubali
- Spouse: Gulshan Devaiah (m. 2012; div. 2020)

Kallirroi Tziafeta (born 6 June 1989) is a Greek actress and model who works in Indian film and series. She started her career as a dancer with Dil Dhadakne Do directed by Zoya Akhtar. She acted as an actress in Netflix series Bard of Blood in 2019 and later in Made in Heaven Season 2, an Indian web-series that premiered on Amazon Prime Video on 10 August 2023. She also worked in Mohan Lal's directorial debut Barroz 3D in 2024.

== Filmography ==
Year	Film	Language	Role	Notes
2015	Dil Dhadakne Do	Hindi		
2019	Pal Pal Dil Ke Paas	Hindi	Karan's mother	
2021	State of Siege: Temple Attack	Hindi	Angela	
2023	Dhak Dhak	Hindi	Martha	
2024	Barroz 3D	Malayalam	Theresa Da Gama	
2025	Nikita Roy	Hindi	Freya	
2026	Accused	Hindi	Sophiana "Sophie" Sarandiz	

== Web Series ==
Year	Title	Role	Platform	Notes
2019	Bard of Blood	Jessica Parker / Sara Mansoor	Netflix	
2021	The Empire	Roxanna	Disney+ Hotstar	
2023	Made in Heaven	Elmira	Amazon Prime Video	
2025	Bindiya Ke Bahubali	Sasha	MX Player	
