= Beyond the Last Mountain =

- Directed by: Javed Jabbar
- Written by: Javed Jabbar
- Produced by: Javed Jabbar
- Starring: Usman Peerzada; Zahoor Ahmed; Subhani Bayounous; Mariana Haq; Humaira Ali; Nighat Sultana; Shamim Hilaly; Muneeza Hashmi
- Music by: Sohail Rana
- Production company: M.N.K. Productions
- Release date: 17 December 1976
- Running time: 120 minutes
- Country: Pakistan
- Language: English

Beyond the Last Mountain is a 1976 English-language Pakistani drama film written and directed by Javed Jabbar. It was Pakistan's first English language film, which was shown at the 6th International Film Festival of India in New Delhi. An Urdu language version, titled Musafir, was also released.

== Plot ==
The story is set in the post-1971 Pakistan following the separation of Bangladesh. A young man returns to Karachi from abroad along with his politician father. The father gets assassinated, and the young man embarks on a struggle to unveil the murderers. During his investigations, he meets four young ladies from the upper-middle class who are willing to help him.

== Cast and crew ==
- Usman Peerzada
- Zahoor Ahmed
- Subhani ba Yunus
- Mariana Haq
- Shamim Hilaly
- Nighat Sultana
- Humaira Ali
- Raja Jameel
- Muneeza Hashmi
- Pia Khan
- Mirza Ghazanfar Begg
- Dear Asghar
- Sohail Rana was the music composer for this film.
- Muniza Basir
- Nazia Hassan & Zoheb Hassan who would go on to become a famous singing duo in the 1980s made cameo appearances in a song in the film. Yasir Akhtar who would go onto become an actor and singer also appeared in the same song.

== Filming locations ==
- Islamabad
- Lyari, Karachi
- Malir, Karachi
- Murree Hills
- Nathia Gali

== Soundtracks ==
The music of the film was composed by Sohail Rana and the lyrics were written by Abaidullah Aleem. Some tracks of the film were:

- Ham Rahi, Aisi Rahon Kay, Jin Ki Koi Manzil Hi Nahin ... Singer: Akhlaq Ahmed
- Woh Chand Chehra, Sitara Ankhen ... Singer: Habib Wali Mohammad
