= Raj Amit Kumar =

American film director

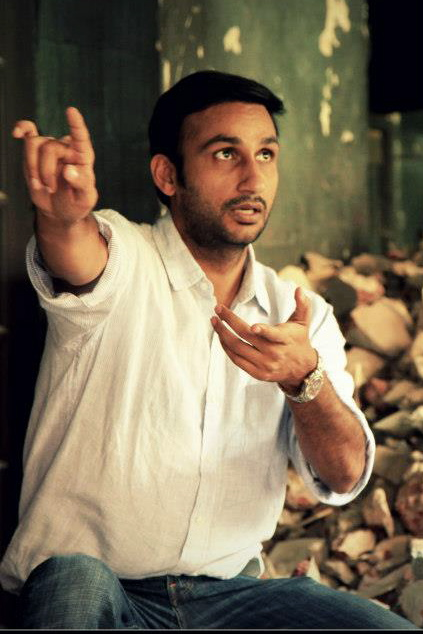
- Occupation: Filmmaker
- Organization(s): Play Studios & Dark Frames
- Notable work: Bindiya Ke Bahubali, Unfreedom, Brown

Raj Amit Kumar is a filmmaker and writer known for Bindiya ke Bahubali (2025, Amazon Prime), Brown (2026) and for his socio-political drama Unfreedom (2015, Netflix) which is banned in India as it dealt with religious fundamentalism and violence against homosexuals. The film was released in the U.S. in 2015, and won a UFVA Faculty Screenwriting Award in 2009, and several other International Awards. The film was later acquired by and released on Netflix despite its continued ban by Censor Board of India. Later the film was removed from Netflix as well.

== Filmmaker and Writer ==
Unfreedom, a socio-political drama, is his first feature film. Set in New York and New Delhi, the film deals with issues of identity and violence. The film stars Victor Banerjee and Adil Hussain.

In a recent interview, Victor Banerjee commended Raj Amit Kumar for his approach to sex and violence in this film, which were an essential part of the story and screenplay, even though he has usually condemned the vulgarity with which these are approached in mainstream cinema.

National Film Awards winner Hari Nair is the cinematographer of the film. Academy Award winner Resul Pookutty has done the sound design and the original music score is by Filmfare Awards winner Wayne Sharpe and Jesse Kotansky.

The script for the film won the first prize in the 2009 Faculty Screenwriting Competition at University Film and Video Association.

His OTT Series Bindiya Ke Bahubali starred Saurabh Shukla, Ranvir Shorey, Seema Biswas, and Sheeba Chaddha released in August 2025 and was declared a sleeper hit. His third film, Brown, is doing screenings around the world.

== Filmography ==
Directed features
Year	Title	Director	Writer	Editor
2015	Unfreedom	Yes	Yes	
2025	Bindiya Ke Bahubali (TV series) Season 1	Yes	Yes	
2026	Bindiya Ke Bahubali (TV series) Season 2	Yes	Yes	Yes
2027	Brown	Yes	Yes	

== Media Academic and Speaker ==
Kumar graduated with a Masters of Arts in Cinema and Media Studies from College of Staten Island (CUNY) in 2006, where he received the George Custen Memorial Award for Academic Excellence. He has also been awarded by the National Scholarship of India for Academic Excellence, and a First Prize in Faculty Screenwriting Award at University Film and Video Association (UFVA) 2009. Having finished his PhD coursework and taking PHD ABD in Cinema and Media studies at Southern Illinois University Carbondale (SIUC) he began work on his first feature-length film Unfreedom.

He is also a media academic, teacher, and writer. He has taught cinema theory and history at both his alma maters between the years 2005 to 2009, and his writings and research papers have been published and presented at various conferences as well.

== Fight against Censorship ==
In India, Unfreedom was refused certification by the Examining Committee; a revising committee of the Censor Board proposed cuts which Kumar refused. He appealed to the Indian Government's Information and Broadcasting Appellate Tribunal FCAT, and in response, the Tribunal completely banned the film. Recently, the news of banning has gained widespread coverage in the media, bringing other filmmakers into the fight against censorship.

== See also ==
- Cinema of India
- Parallel Cinema
