= Sultan Muhammad Khan =

Afghan statesman and author (c. 1860–1931)

Mir Munshi Aala Chaudhry Sultan Muhammad Khan Khan Bahadur
- چودھری سلطان محمد خان
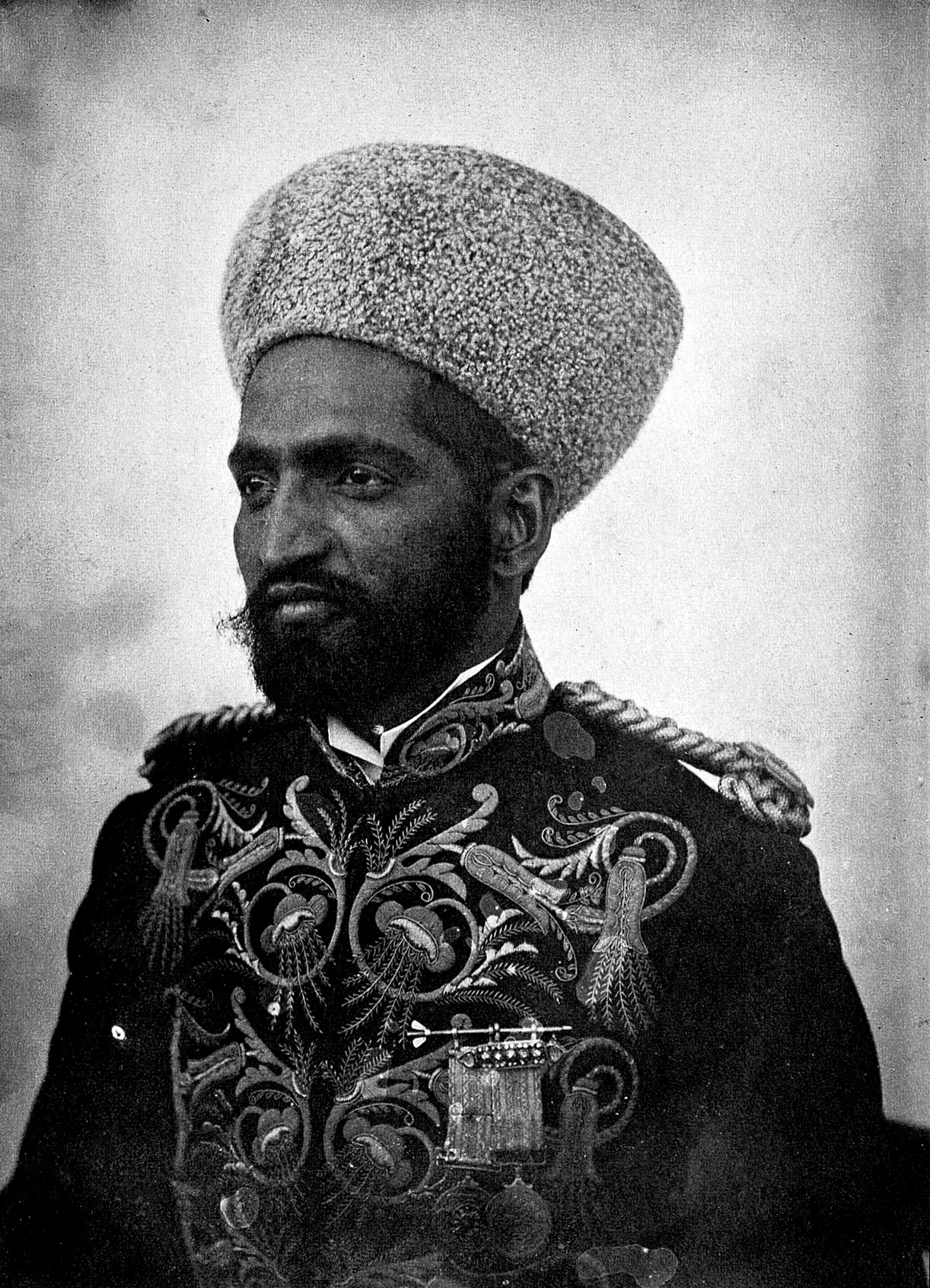
- Born: c. 1860; Kala Qadir, District Sialkot, Punjab Province, British Raj
- Died: 1931; Sialkot, Punjab
- Education: Barrister
- Alma mater: Christ's College, Cambridge
- Occupation: Ambassador of Emirate of Afghanistan to United Kingdom
- Years active: 1898–1905
- Spouse(s): Sayra Jan; Sultan Fatima

Chaudhry Sultan Muhammad Khan (c. 1860 – 1931) was a barrister, author and statesman from Punjab Province, British India, who on various occasions served as an official for Emir Abdur Rahman Khan of Afghanistan, first as chief secretary (mir munshi-e-aala) to the emir and later as ambassador of Afghanistan to the United Kingdom.

He was the father of Pakistani poet and author Faiz Ahmad Faiz.

== Early life ==
Early biographical details of Sultan Muhammad Khan are scanty. He was born in a poor Punjabi family to Sahibzada Khan near Sialkot. He started his life herding cattle in the Kala Qadir village in the District Sialkot. According to his own account, he used to leave cattle to graze in a ground and attend a nearby village school, after the school teacher allowed him to do so. Sultan Muhammad passed village examination in 1873, and after earning scholarship from the Education Department of the Government of Punjab, later attended government highschool, which he passed with distinction in 1880. In 1883 he went to Lahore to attain higher education. During this period he worked as a coolie and an Imam in a local mosque to support himself. He also developed fluency in a number of languages, including Persian, Urdu, Punjabi, Arabic, English, Pashto and Russian, which would help him in his later career.

== Career in Afghanistan ==
Sometimes later, Sultan Muhammad met an Afghan councillor, Sardar Amir Khan at the mosque where he was Imam and impressed him with his skills in English and Persian. Sultan Muhammad Khan was hired by the councillor as a tutor for his household. In 1888, Sultan Muhammad went with Amir Khan to Afghanistan where he was introduced to Emir Abdur Rahman of Afghanistan. Abdur Rahman, who was keen to establish closer links with British India and to consolidate his control over Afghanistan, offered him job as a translator and record-keeper which Khan accepted.

Sultan Muhammad Khan eventually rose to position of Mir Munshi-e-Aala (Chief Secretary) in Afghanistan in 1892, and married Sayra Jan, daughter of emir's brother Sardar Muhammad Rafiq Khan, although she died two years later, leaving a daughter behind.

In 1897, Sultan Muhammad was alarmed by Dr. Lillias Hamilton, a British physician of Emir Abdur Rahman and one of his good friends, regarding a possible conspiracy against him in the court. He fled to Punjab but was jailed by the British authorities on the suspicions of being an Afghan spy, and could get free only with the intervention of Dr. Hamilton.

== Career in United Kingdom ==
After getting free from jail, Sultan Muhammad moved to London in 1898. He was admitted to Bar at Law at Christ's College, Cambridge. At the same time he was officially appointed as ambassador of Afghanistan to United Kingdom by Emir Abdur Rahman. He served in this position during the reign of his successor, Habibullah Khan as well, until 1905. Between 1905 and 1907 he practiced as a barrister in London. He also met a number of Muslim dignitaries and leaders, including Sir Muhammad Iqbal, Sir Mian Muhammad Shafi, Sir Fazl-i-Hussain, and Sir Abdul Qadir.

== Return to British India ==
Sultan Muhammad returned from British India and settled in Sialkot in 1908. He was granted vast lands in Sargodha by the British government, as well as the title of Khan Bahadur. He died in Sialkot in 1931.

== Personal life ==
Sultan Muhammad married Sayra Jan, a niece of Emir Abdur Rahman Khan. She died two years later and was buried near Kabul. He had a daughter with her named Bibi Gul. After his arrival from London in 1908 his other Afghan wives joined him at Sialkot. His fifth wife, Sultan Fatima was a daughter of a landlord from a village named Jessar. He had following sons from her:

- Tufail Ahmed, judge
- Faiz Ahmad Faiz, teacher and poet
- Inayat, Major in British Indian Army
- Bashir, disabled from birth

== Published works ==
- The Constitution and Laws of Afghanistan, comprising 164 pages, published in London, in 1900 by Jon Marry Printing Press
- The Life of Amir Abdur Rahman, Volumes I & II, printed in 1900, by John Murray, Albemarle Street London, reprinted, in 1980, by Oxford University Press, Karachi
