= Yasir Akhtar =

Pakistani-British singer, actor, lyricist, director and producer

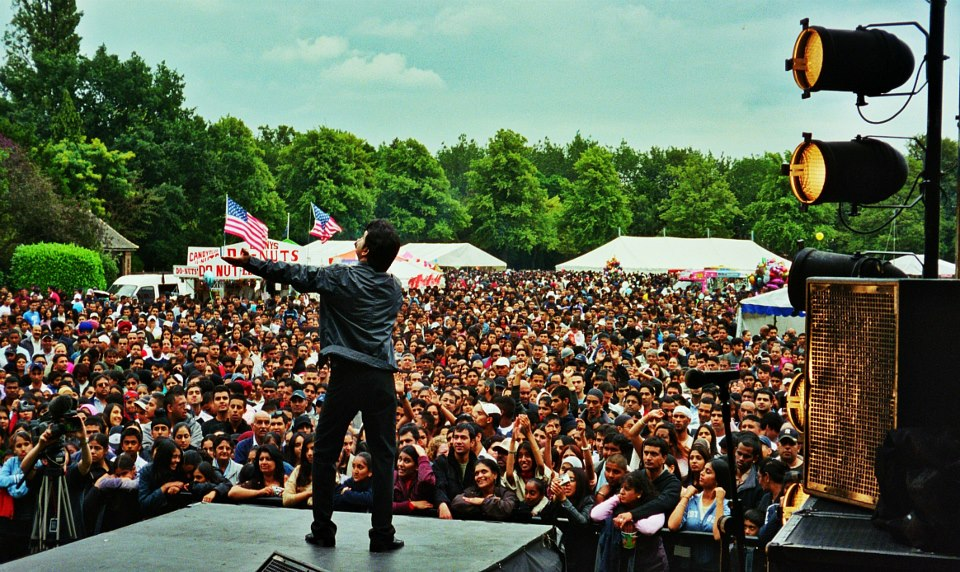
- Akhtar singing in a concert in Birmingham
- Born: 23 November 1972 (age 53); Karachi, Pakistan

Yasir Akhtar (born 23 November 1972) is a Pakistani-British filmmaker, singer, songwriter, actor, director and producer. Akhtar is also the owner of film production company Pegasus Productions.

== Early life and education ==
Akhtar was born in a Pakistani Business class family to Mohammad Akhtar Shafi and Rizwana Akhtar where his father Mohammad Akhtar Shafi was a businessman, his siblings including Shazia Akhtar and Aamer Akhter has also been into the showbiz industry. He graduated from Government College of Commerce and Economics, Karachi. Akhtar's mother, Rizwana Akhtar is the elder sister of Javed Jabbar. Before the partition of India, Akhtar's maternal grandfather, Ahmed Abdul Jabbar, served as an official in Hyderabad, India. Akhtar spent most of his childhood working alongside his first cousin Mehreen Jabbar (filmmaker) at his uncle Javed Jabbar's company.

== Career in music and performances ==
Akhtar started his singing career as a vocalist in the band The Arid Zone in 1989. 'The Arid Zone' launched their first album in 1993 through EMI Pakistan. Later he also produced and performed in various songs as a musician and singer like Kabhi Tu Hoga Mera Milan, Chandni, Teray Naal Dil, Jogi, Zara Man Ko Dekhna, Aey Sanam, My love, Chan Mai, Laut Aao Na, Choom Loo Aasman, Sansani, Araam Naal Kar, Assalamualaika Ya Nabi(SAW) etc. Akhtar also performed in various countries like UK, USA, Pakistan, Greece, Spain, UAE etc.

Akhtar launched the musical band ‘The Arid Zone’ with his friends Kamran Jelani (Keyboards) and Shareb Jaffer (Guitarist). The trio started touring nationwide after the release of the first album 'The Arid Zone-Vol1.

Besides performing in Pakistan and United Kingdom, Akhtar has performed internationally in New York, Chicago, California, Washington DC, Greece, Spain and more. Akhtar's musical performances and interviews have been aired on B4U Music, Zee TV, MTV Pakistan, PTV Network, Sony Entertainment, BBC Asian Network and many other prominent television channels.

== Releases ==
‘The Arid Zone - Vol 1’ was released by EMI Pakistan in 1994. Later, Akhtar released ‘The Arid Zone-Jogi’ and ‘Yasir-My Love’. Akhtar has performed the following songs like Kabhi tu Hoga Mera Milan, Chandni, Laut Aao Na, Teray Naal Dil, Zara Man Ko Dekhna, Jogi, Choom Lo Aasmaan Ko, Sohniyeah, Pyar Diyan Gallan, My Love, Aey Sanam, Chan Mai and many more. Akhtar's musical albums were sponsored by Mobilink parent company of Jazz, English Biscuits, Peek Freans, Phillips and other multinational companies.

The musical group 'The Arid Zone' released their second album ‘The Arid Zone - Jogi’in 1997. In 2001, Akhtar released a solo album ‘Yasir-My Love'. The album released successful songs like Aye Sanam, My Love, Chan Mai, SurMai Sey Shaam and many more. The music videos of this album launched the careers of Zara Sheikh (filmstar) and Tooba Siddiqui (model and actress). In 2015, Akhtar went to Turkey to film the music video of the single Sansani - The Sensation. In London, he shot a folk-rap song Araam Naal Kar - Take it Easy in 2018. Some parts of the ‘Take it Easy’ were derived from popular Sufi poet Bulleh Shah. The rap part was written by himself. Akhtar recorded 'Assalamulalaika Ya Nabi" a Naat/Nasheed in 2019 and released it internationally.

== As an actor ==
Akhtar started his career as a child actor in Pakistan's English feature film 'Beyond the Last Mountain'. Akhtar kept on appearing in TV commercials in school days. When Akhtar was 16 years old, he appeared with his younger sister Shazia Akhtar in PTV Network's drama serial 'Dastak' produced by Shahzad Khalil. As a teenager, he appeared as a model in TV commercials of English Biscuits, Peek Freans, Rafhan, Gillette and many other companies. Meanwhile, in the college, Akhtar started appearing as hero in Pakistan's national network's major drama serials. Naming few drama serials where his work was acknowledged were - Tapish, Khawab Suhanay, Yeh Jahan, Kallo, Monsoon, Phir Yun Hua, Machar Party Aaway see Aaway etc.

== As director and producer ==
Akhtar got his first assignment as a Director and Producer at an early age, The executive producer of Combine Productions Ghazanfer Ali gave him work to direct and produce Music Channel Charts in 1994, it was the very first pop chart show of Pakistan. Akhtar also launched the musical drama serial ‘French Toast’ based on a story of the struggle of musical band in 1995. 'French Toast' was aired on Zee TV in the UK and U.S.A. as well as on NTM in Pakistan.

Akhtar also produced the first ever telefilm series of Pakistan called Tapal Cinema. The series was loved and acknowledged by the audience and was sponsored by tea company Tapal Tea. The project had six telefilms namely Rahain, Titlee, Shehzadi, Zeher, Chand and Kashish. Akhtar's ‘Tapal Cinema’ launched the careers of Humayun Saeed, Shamoon Abbasi, Javeria Abbasi, Zubair Abbasi and many others.

Mere Ghar Aik Whirlpool was also a known drama serial of Pakistan in 1999 created by Akhtar. The style of brand placement associated with entertainment made the serial popular as Whirlpool name was used in the drama, This idea turned to be profitable for the creators and started a new trend of branded drama serials in Pakistan. The project was sponsored by Phillips - Whirlpool. Artists Like Nida Yasir, Adeel Hayat Ansari, Naeem Shaikh, Salman Saqib Sheikh (Hira Mani’s husband) and many others were introduced to the industry with Mera Ghar Aik Whirlpool.

British Asian drama serial Sard Aag-Cold Fire was produced by Akhtar in 2006. which was filmed in Manchester and London and was aired on Hum TV, for which Akhtar also auditioned new talent from places like Birmingham, London and Manchester. where he Introduced Jessica Bath, Mani Liaqat, Ali Khalid etc. 'Sard Aag' also had actors like Abid Ali, Noman Ijaz, Shalaka Ranadive in the cast list. Akhtar has also organizied events for [High Commission for Pakistan] and Bradford. Akhtar’s productions has been broadcast on channels like BBC, PTV Home, Zee TV, Sony TV, B4U Music, Geo TV, ARY digital.

== Protégé ==
Through Music Channel Charts, Akhtar introduced artists like Shehzad Roy, Fakhar-e-Alam, Najam Sheraz, Komal Rizvi, Fringe Benefits, Jazba, Nadeem Jafri, Azfar Ali and many more to the Pakistani Entertainment Industry. Akhtar produced and directed 50 episodes of pop chart show Music Channel Charts. As a director and producer, Akhtar launched the careers of many artists like Armeena Rana Khan, Tooba Siddiqui, Humayun Saeed, Nida Yasir, Javeria Abbasi, Fakhr e Alam, Najam Sheraz, Komal Rizvi, Shehzad Roy, Shamoon Abbasi and various other artists to the Pakistani Industry.

=== Acting, direction and production ===
Title	Role	Year	Airing Channel	Notes
Peek Freans - Spicy / English Biscuits	Child actor/Main	1975	PTV Network	Produced by MNJ Communications
Beyond the Last Mountain (Musafir)	Child artist	1976	Cinema	Produced & directed by Javed Jabbar
Profile Shampoo	Child Artist	1978	PTV Network	TV Advert - MNJ Communications
Rafhan (Fiesta Drink)	Main Model	1984	PTV Network	TV Advert - MNJ Communications
Dastak	Actor/Supporting	1986	PTV Network	7 episodes drama serial
Tapish	actor/Major role	1987	PTV Network	16 episodes drama serial
Gillete Commercial	Main Model	1988	PTV Network	TV Advert (45.Secs.)
Khawab Suhanay	Actor/Main	1990	PTV Network	13 episodes drama serial
Peek Freans - English Biscuits/Peanut Pik	Model	1991	PTV Network	TV Advert - MNJ Communications
Yeh Jahan	Actor	1991	PTV Network	7 episodes drama serial
Music Channel Charts	Singer/Director/Producer	1995	NTM/STN/PTV Network/Zee TV	Pakistan's first ever pop charts show
French Toast	Actor/Director/Producer	1995	NTM/STN/PTV Network/Zee TV	Pakistan's first ever drama serial based on the life of a musical band
Tapal Cinema	Actor/Director/Producer	1996	NTM/STN/PTV Network	Pakistan's first ever musical telefilm series
Machchar Party Aaway hee Aaway	Actor/Main Role	1996	NTM/STN	Telefilm. 90 minutes approx.
Rahain (Tapal Cinema)	Actor/Director/Producer	1996	NTM / STN / PTV Network	Telefilm. 90 minutes approx.
Titlee (Tapal Cinema)	Director/Producer	1996	NTM / PTV Network	Telefilm. 90 minutes approx.
Shehzadi (Tapal Cinema)	Director/Producer	1996	NTM / PTV Network	Telefilm. 90 minutes approx.
Zehr (Tapal Cinema)	Director/Producer	1996	NTM / PTV Network	Telefilm. 90 minutes approx.
Chand (Tapal Cinema)	Director/Producer	1996	NTM / PTV Network	Telefilm. 90 minutes approx.
Kashish (Tapal Cinema)	Director/Producer	1997	NTM / PTV Network	Telefilm. 90 minutes approx.
Monsoon	Actor, Main role	1998	PTV Network	26 episodes, drama serial
Mera Ghar Aik Whirlpool	Actor/Director/Producer, Main Role	1999	PTV Network	Pakistan's first ever branded drama serial
Bachelors	Actor, Main role	2000	PTV Network	13 episodes drama serial
Jayen Kahan Armaan	Director/Producer/Actor, Main role	2003	ARY Digital	52 episodes drama serial
Brooke Bond Supreme - Series 60 TV Commercials	Director/Producer	2003	National Network and Satellite Channels	Series of 60 TV adverts with 60 celebrities, one in each advert
Sard Aag	Director/Producer/Actor, Main role	2006	Hum TV	24 episodes drama serial. First ever British Asian drama serial shot in Manchester, UK
Laahasil	Actor, Special Appearance	2005	Hum TV	16 episodes
Tetley Tea (TV Commercial)	Director/Producer	2007	All Networks	Famous actress Sakina Sammo appeared as main artist
Respect	Director/Producer	2015	Yorkshire Housing	Short-film
Reem Rice TV Adverts with Hira Mani	Director/Producer	2019	Middle East- Al Ghurair Group of UAE/Al Muhaidib Group of Saudi Arabia	3 TV Commercials
Azaad	Actor/Director/Producer	2020	Group M / Aaj TV	Releasing in 2020
Mujh Ko Pata Hai	Actor/Director/Producer	2020	Yet to be finalized	Under production
Rung DoRangi	Actor/Director/Producer/Singer	2021	LTN Family	Film

=== Musical work ===
Album	Song	Year	Participation
The Arid Zone Vol 1		1992	
	Kabhi tu Hoga Mera milan		Singer/Writer/Composer
	Tu Jo Mujh Sey Milee		Singer/Writer/Composer
	Laut Aao Na		Singer/Lyricist
	Aik Zameen		Singer/Lyricist/Composer
	Tum Meray Ho		Singer/Writer
	Sehra		Singer/Writer/Composer
	Tu hai Jahan		Singer/Writer/Composer
	Gadi Bhar Kay		Singer/Writer/Composer
	Jeewan		Singer/Lyricist
	Akhian		Singer/Lyricist
	Kal Raat		Singer/Writer
	Chali Aana		Singer/Writer

Album	Song	Year	Participation
The Arid Zone - Jogi - Yasir Akhtar		1996	
	Teray Naal Dil		Singer/Writer/Composer
	Chandni		Singer/Writer/Composer
	Jogi		Singer/Lyricist/Composer
	Zara Man Ko Dekhna		Singer/Lyricist/Composer
	Teray Bina		Singer/Writer/Composer
	Donon Gum thay		Singer/Writer/Composer
	Tum Jo Chaho		Singer/Writer/Composer
	In Sooni Lehroon		Singer/Writer/Composer
	Tu Jo Meray Paas		Singer/Lyricist
	Choom Lo Aasman		Singer/Lyricist
	Jo Bhi Hoga		Singer/Writer/Composer

Album	Song	Year	Participation
Yasir - My Love		2001	
	Chan Mai		Singer/Writer/Composer
	Sanam		Singer/Writer/Composer
	Nach Meran Dil		Singer/Lyricist/Composer
	Betab		Singer/Lyricist/Composer
	Surmai Sey Shaam		Singer/Writer/Composer
	Sohna Ali		Singer/Writer/Composer
	Milan (Remix)		Singer/Writer/Composer
	Oh My Love		Singer/Writer/Composer
	Sohni Mitti		Singer/Lyricist
	Sohna Ali		Singer/Writer/Composer
	Milan (Remix)		Singer/Writer/Composer
	Oh My Love		Singer/Writer/Composer
	Sohni Mitti		Singer/Lyricist
	Chanchal		Singer/Lyricist
	Samay		Singer/Writer

Singles & Albums	Song	Year	Participation
Music Channel	Tu Jo Mujh Sey Milee hai	1991	Singer/Writer/Composer
Music Channel Charts Vol. 2	Sohniyeah	1995	Singer/Writer/Composer
Music Channel Charts Vol. 3	Pyar Diyan Gallan	1995	Singer/Writer/Composer
Jayen Kahan Armaan OST	Jayen Kahan Arman	2003	Singer/Lyricist/Composer
Sard Aag 0ST	Sun Rey Pawan	2005	Singer/Lyricist/Composer
Single	Sansani - The Sensation	2016	Singer/Writer/Composer
Single	Araam Naal Kar - Take it Easy	2018	Singer/Writer/Composer
Single	Asslamualaika Ya Nabi(SAW)	2019	Singer/Writer/Composer

=== Music videos - production work ===
Title	Artist	Year	Participation	Notes
Kabhi Tu Hoga Mera Milan	The Arid Zone	1993	Director/Producer	Pop
Sari Sari Raat	Ustaad Nusrat Fateh Ali Khan	1995	Director/Producer	Qawali
Khilona	Strings	1995	Director/Producer	Pop/Song on Child labour
Insay Nain Mila kay Dekho	Najam Shiraz	1995	Actor/Director	Pop
Active	Shehzad Roy	1995	Director/Producer	Pop
Sohni Mahinwal	Collage (Musical Group)	1995	Director/Producer	Rock/Folk/Collage's Debut Video
Loori	Strings	1995	Director/Producer	Pop
Raat	Rizwan (Final Cut)	1995	Director/Producer	Rock
Deewana	Mohsin Raza (Bunny)	1995	Director/Producer	Pop
Tanhai	Fringe Benefits	1995	Director/Producer	Pop/Fringe Benefits Debut Video
Bhangra Rap 2	Fakhar-e-Alam	1995	Director/Producer	Rap/Pop
Aakhir Kyun	Jazba (Group)	1994	Director/Producer	Pop - Song on Injustice and Unemployment
Aey Naz	Khalid Anum	1994	Director/Producer	Pop/Folk
Socho Kabhi	Nadeem Jafri	1994	Director/Producer	Pop/Nadeem Jafri's Debut Video
Gadi Bhar Kay	The Arid Zone	1994	Director/Producer	Soft Rock
Jago	Jazba	1995	Director/Producer	Pop/Kashmir dispute song
Saathiya	Komal Rizvi	1994	Producer/Director	Ghazal/Pop Komal Rizvi's Debut Video
Aaja Janejaan	Heart Communications	1995	Director/Producer	Pop
Gori Zara Hans Kay Dekhana	Fakhar-e-Alam & Nadeem Jafri	1995	Director/Producer	Pop
Roshni	Mohsin Raza (Bunny)	1995	Director/Producer	Pop
Yeh Zindagi	Fringe Benefits	1995	Director/Producer	Pop
Meri Umeed	Nadeem Jafri	1995	Director/Producer	Pop/National Song
Yadain	Sequencers	1995	Director/Producer	Pop
Challah	Aamir Saleem	1995	Director Producer	Folk
Aag	Milestones	1995	Director/Producer	Pop
Fasla	Collage (Musical Group)	1995	Director/Producer	Pop/Rock
Main Tujhay Dhondhoon	Alamgir	1995	Director/Producer	Pop
Kabhi Tu Hoga Mera Milan	The Arid Zone	1993	Director/Producer	Pop
Janejaan	Milesones	1995	Director/Producer	Soft Rock
Aa Heeriyeah	Collage	1995	Director/Producer	Pop/Rock
Aankhon Aankhon Main	Sequencers	1994	Director/Producer	Pop
Laut Aao Na	The Arid Zone	1994	Director/Producer	Pop Rock
Kal Raat	The Arid Zone	1994	Director/Producer	Pop Rock
Tu Hai Jahan	The Arid Zone	1994	Director/Producer	Pop Rock
Teri Aankhoon ki Qasam	Zubin Shah	1997	Director/Producer	Pop
Tu Jo Mila	Komal Rizvi	1997	Director/Producer	Pop
Chali Aaon	The Arid Zone	1994	Director/Producer	Pop Rock
Bholna	Sequencers	1995	Producer/Director	Pop
Dekho	Komal Rizvi	1997	Director/Producer	Pop
Parbat	Komal Rizvi	1996	Director/Producer	Pop/Peace Song
Hatto Bacho	Hassan Jehangir	1998	Director/Producer	Pop
Tum Sung Naina	Sadaf Munir	1999	Director/Producer	Remix of a classic song from PTV by Rubina Badar
Chiraatlah	Raheem Shah	2000	Director/Producer	Pop
Oh My Love	Yasir Akhtar	2001	Singer/Director/Producer	Pop
Aey Sanam	Yasir Akhtar	1995	Singer/Director/Producer	Pop
Chan Mai	Yasir Akhtar	2001	Singer/Director/Producer	Pop
Stop the War (Song for Peace)	Nasir Khan, Cheshire Cat, Nas-T & Man-E	2008	Director	Pop/Rap
Dil Lena(Remix)	Mirza MC / JKD	2009	Director/Producer	Hip Hop/Rap
Jachda	Kaz Khan	2010	Director/Producer	Pop
Tera Mukhra	Mirza MC featuring JKD	2011	Director/Producer	Hip Hop/Rap
Cham Cham	Apache Indian/JKD/Mirza MC	2011	Director/Producer	Rap/HipHop
Majaja	Mirza MC featuring I.G.Ali	2012	Director/Producer	Hip Hop/Rap
Tere Bina Ye Suna	Babar Malik(BM)	2012	Director/Producer	Pop
Judaa	Rehan Siddiqui	2013	Director/Producer	Pop
Insaf	Kaz Khan	2014	Director/Producer	Pop
Pagal Jiya	Apache Indian/Sheeba Khan	2015	Director/Producer	Hip Hop/Pop
Sansani-The Sensation	Yasir Akhtar	2015	Director/Producer	Pop
Araam Naal Kar (Take it Easy)	Yasir Akhtar	2017	Director/Producer	Hip Hop/Folk
AssalamuaAlaika Ya Nabi (SAW)	Yasir Akhtar	2018	Director/Producer	Naat/Nasheed
Saiyaan	Yasir Akhtar	2020	Director/Producer	Pop/Rock
