= Faisal Qureshi (Pakistani comedian) =

Pakistani actor, director and writer

- فیصل قریشی
- Born: Faisal Qureshi; 17 September 1973 (age 53); Hyderabad, Pakistan
- Education: National College of Arts, Lahore
- Occupations: Television actor, director, producer, screenwriter, humorist
- Years active: 1995–present
- Known for: Directing television sitcoms, commercials and music videos
- Notable work: Teen Bata Teen, Ultaa Seedha, Uski Suno Awaz
- Children: 3 (Nia, Nurae, Izel)
- Relatives: Imran Qureshi (brother)

Faisal Qureshi is a Pakistani television personality, actor, director, writer, drama producer and humorist. He is known for directing or writing comedy dramas, sitcoms, commercials and music videos.

== Life and career ==
Faisal Qureshi was born in Hyderabad, Pakistan. His father was principal of Government City College, Hyderabad. Faisal attended early schooling in Lahore and graduated in graphic designing from National College of Arts. Qureshi began his career as a child artist and appeared in the plays Emergency Ward and Andhera Ujala for PTV. He started his career as a play writer with his brother Imran Qureshi. Faisal wrote and acted in various plays and then became VJ by hosting a show Video Junction which was previously hosted by Hadiqa Kiani in 1995. He gained popularity by producing the sitcom Teen Bata Teen which was aired on PTV Home in 1995. Faisal then directed many comedy-dramas and sitcoms, including Ulta Seedha and Uski Suno Awaz, which were aired on GEO Entertainment. He has also directed television commercials and music videos.

== Films ==
- Teri Meri Love Story (2016) as Don Raju
- Teefa in Trouble (2018) as Tony
- The Donkey King (2018) as Breaking News
- Call To Action (2020)
- Money Back Guarantee (2023)(Directorial debut)

== Television ==
Year	Program	Role	Channel
1995	Teen Bata Teen	Shafu	PTV
1999	Kollege Jeans	Faisal Qureshi	PTV
1999-2000	2 Good	Abdul	PTV
2007	Ulta Seedha	producer and director	AAG TV
2011	USA-Uski Suno Awaz	producer and director	Geo Entertainment

== See also ==
- List of Pakistani television directors
