= Teen Bata Teen =

Pakistani sitcom

- Title screen
- Genre: Comedy
- Written by: Adeel Hashmi
- Directed by: Jawad Bashir
- Starring: Ali Tahir; Adeel Hashmi; Faisal Qureshi; Mira Hashmi; Wajeeha Tahir; Fatima
- Country of origin: Pakistan
- Original language: Urdu
- No. of episodes: 26

Production
- Producer: Muhammad Nafees

Original release
- Network: PTV
- Release: 1995

Teen Bata Teen (Urdu: تین بٹا تین, lit. 'Three divided by three') is a 1995 Pakistani comedy-drama sitcom which was written by Adeel Hashmi and directed by Jawad Bashir. It was the first television sitcom of Pakistan. It was aired on Pakistan Television Corporation (PTV One, now PTV Home).

== Overview ==
Teen Bata Teen was aired in 1995 on PTV Home and starred Ali Tahir, Adeel Hashmi, Faisal Qureshi, Mira Hashmi, Wajeeha Tahir and Fatima. This sitcom, featuring a trio of roommates, became very popular and was also named as the first television sitcom aired in Pakistan.

== Cast ==
Main

- Ali Tahir as Johnny
- Adeel Hashmi as Lucy
- Shahid Mehmood as Timmy
- Mira Hashmi as Mehreen
- Wajeeha Tahir as Beenish
- Fatima Ahmed Khan as Zara

Recurring

- Faisal Qureshi as Shaffu

Supporting characters

- Salman Shahid as Kharoos Buddha
- Rehana Siddiqui as Masi
- Ibrahim as Doodh Waala
- Moattar Asim Bukhari as Naani Amma
- Jawad Bashir as Javed
- Saba Hameed as Saba
- Nadia Jamil as Nadia

=== Season 2 ===
- Omair Rana as Johnny
