= Uncle Sargam =

Puppet character in Pakistan

- Kaliyan, Sargam Time, Daak Time, Siyasi Kaliyan, Sargam Back Home character
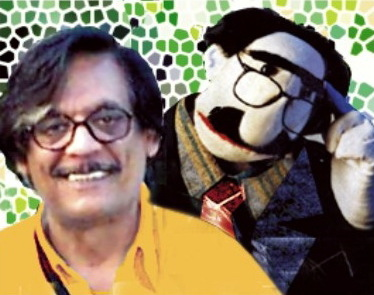
- Farooq Qaiser and his puppet Uncle Sargam
- First appearance: 1976
- Created by: Farooq Qaiser
- Voiced by: Farooq Qaiser

In-universe information
- Nickname: Sargam
- Gender: Male
- Religion: Muslim
- Nationality: Pakistani

Uncle Sargam (Urdu: انکل سرگم) is a puppet character that first appeared in the Pakistani children's television show Kaliyan, aired on PTV in 1976. Uncle Sargam was created and voiced by the award-winning puppeteer and television director Farooq Qaiser. Uncle Sargam and Maasi Museebtay are regarded as Pakistan's legendary puppet duo.

The satirical Uncle Sargam was the most vocal critic on state television under General Zia-ul-Haq's dictatorship in the 1980s. Later appearances were in the TV show Daak Time in 1993. The character reappeared and hosted a television talk show Syasi Kaliyan at Dawn News in 2010.

The character also appeared in a Pakistan National Council of the Arts-organised show in Islamabad. Uncle Sargam later appeared in a charity show function organised by the NGO Mashal at the National Library of Pakistan in Islamabad in July 2013. In March 2014, the Oxford University Press held an Uncle Sargam puppet show to help children differentiate between original and pirated books at Peshawar's Archives Library.

In 2018, a diorama of Uncle Sargam was inaugurated at Lok Virsa Museum in Islamabad as a tribute to both the character and Farooq Qaiser.

== Recognition ==
On 1 November 2023, a Google Doodle featuring Uncle Sargam and Masi Museebtay celebrated the 78th birthday of Farooq Qaiser.
