= Subh-e-Azadi =

1947 poem written by Faiz Ahmed Faiz

- Subh-e-Azadi (August 1947)
- by Faiz Ahmed Faiz
- Original title: صبح آزادی
- Translator: Victor Kiernan, Shiv K. Kumar, Naomi Lazard, Agha Shahid Ali, Ralph Russell, Ludmila Vasilyeva
- Written: August 1947
- First published in: 1996
- Country: Pakistan
- Language: Urdu
- Publisher: Center for South Asia, University of Wisconsin–Madison
- Publication date: 1996

Subh-e-Azadi (Dawn of Freedom – August 1947) (Note: The poem was originally written by the poet in Urdu language. It is a literal translation done by not-known writer(s) of the original text, therefore it may not be accurate)

This stain-covered daybreak, this night-bitten dawn,

This is not that dawn of which there was expectation;

This is not that dawn with longing for which;

The friends set out, (convinced) that somewhere

there would be met with.

Subh-e-Azadi (lit.'Dawn of Independence' or 'Morning of freedom'), also spelled Subh-e-Aazadi or written as Subh e Azadi, is an Urdu language poem by Pakistani poet Faiz Ahmed Faiz, written in 1947. The poem is often noted for its prose style, marxist perspectives, disappointment, anguish, and critic atmosphere. It centers partition of India after the British rule ended in the Indian subcontinent, leading to rise different concerns and feelings associated with multi-ethnic origin. The poem primarily revolves around the poet's sentiments and emotions about those people who migrated from one sovereign state to another, leaving their native places. Subh-e-Azadi was written as an expression of solidarity with the people who were living either in India or Pakistan before the region split into two independent nations.

The poem illustrates the split of the Indian subcontinent in an imaginary style, covering aftermath and its related events as personally felt or realized by the poet. The poem also illustrates displeasure of the poet which he claimed or saw across India–Pakistan borders. Faiz expresses his emotional pain, sadness or distress about the cost paid for sovereignty and suggests a degree of resignation.

== History ==
Subh-e-Azadi was written on the first day of Pakistan, highlighting the issues encountered or experienced by the new sovereign state. In this poem, the author expresses his disappointments experienced during or after the partition. It is also claimed he wrote the poem in solidarity with people killed or displaced during 1947 intrastate war that saw religious as well as patriotic violences from the both sides such as India and Pakistan.

== Analysis ==
Subh-e-Azadi is often recognized as a narrative poem. It reads naturally, conversationally or possibly emotionally and begins as a kind of cross-border depiction of partition. It consists of four to seven modern prose style stanzas of lines each. At some occurrences, the first line loosely rhymes with the third and fourth, and since it is an Urdu language poem, the second line doesn't rhymes with the next one. The rhythmic variation of the poem and its Urdu language naturalness affects the reader's sense of expectation. The poem is recognized one of the prominent writings of Faiz which was "praised" as well as "criticised" by the both nations.

== Reactions ==
Subh-e-Azadi's lyricism associated with British political movement expresses the poet's sorrow about events occurred during or after partition. It was criticised by the notable authors, raising their concerns about its views and ideological style in which poet has opposed the sovereignty of the two nations (freedom/partition). Some writers criticised Faiz's sorrow over freedom and expressed their views citing "freedom had finally arrived". One of progressive poets Ali Sardar Jafri described the poem "half truth" citing "a poem like Subh-e-Azadi could be written by both an Islamist or a Hindu organization". A Pakistani scholar Fateh Mohammad Malik defended the poem citing "critics never managed to see in it his deep" and patriotic contribution made via poem.
