= Hari Nair =

Indian cinematographer (born 1965)

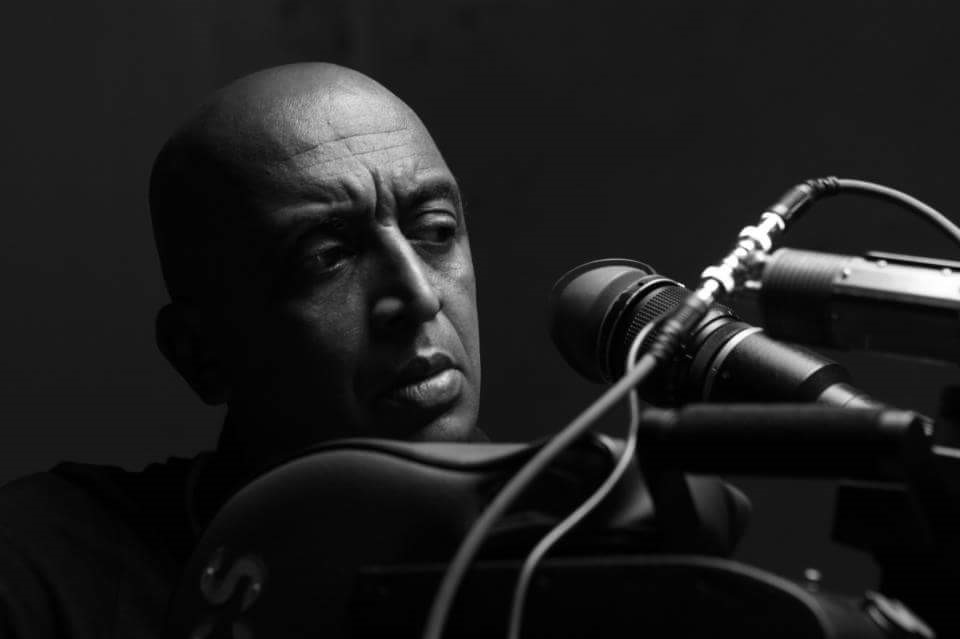
- Born: Malappuram, Kerala, India
- Education: FTII
- Occupation: Cinematographer

Hari Nair is an Indian cinematographer known for his works in Malayalam cinema, Bengali cinema, English cinema, Hindi cinema. Hari graduated from the Film and Television Institute of India (FTII). He was born on 31 March 1965 at Ponnani. His father K.P. Rajgopalan Nair was the head of the department of Cinematography at the Film and Television Institute of India.

== Career ==
Hari, a member of the Indian Society of Cinematographers and graduated from the Film and Television Institute of India and went on to completing many features in different Indian languages.

He was awarded the National Award for best Cinematographer for the film Sham's Vision (Non Feature film), he received his first Kerala state award in Swaham (1994) and second for Ennu Swantham Janakikutty (1997).

== Filmography ==
=== Films ===
Year	Title	Language	Notes
1994	Swaham	Malayalam	
1997	Dahan	Bengali	
1998	Janmadinam	Malayalam	
1998	Ennu Swantham Janakikutty	Malayalam	
1999	Star Bestsellers: First Kill	Hindi	
1999	Shool	Hindi	
2001	Paagalpan	Hindi	
2003	88 Antop Hill	Hindi	
2003	Achante Kochumolku	Malayalam	
2004	Uuf Kya Jaadoo Mohabbat Hai...	Hindi	
2004	King of Bollywood	Hindi	
2005	U, Bomsi n Me	Hindi	
2009	Zor Lagaa Ke...Haiya!	Hindi	
2009	Kerala Cafe	Malayalam	
2009	The White Elephant	Hindi	
2012	Theevram	Malayalam	
2012	Shutter	Malayalam	
2014	Balyakalasakhi	Malayalam	
2014	Apothecary	Malayalam	
2014	Unfreedom	English	
2015	Rasputin	Malayalam	
2015	Ben	Malayalam	
2016	Ithu Thaanda Police	Malayalam	
2017	Ayal Jeevichiruppundu	Malayalam	
2017	Hamara Tiranga	Hindi	
2017	K Sera Sera	Konkani	
2018	Yaksh	Hindi	
2018	Ahaa Re	Bengali	
2018	Tanashah	Hindi	

=== Web series ===
Year	Title	Network	Notes
2020	Naxalbari	ZEE5	
2022	Khakee: The Bihar Chapter	Netflix	

== Awards and nominations ==
Year	Award	Category	Result	Work	Ref
1994	Kerala State Film Awards	Best Photography	Won	Swaham	
1996	National Film Awards	Best Cinematography for a non-feature film	Won	Sham's Vision	
1997	Kerala State Film Awards	Best Photography	Won	Ennu Swantham Janakikutty	
2018	Goa State Film Awards	Best Cinematography	Won	K Sera Sera	
