= Salima Hashmi =

Pakistani painter, artist, former college professor and anti-nuclear weapons activist

Salima Hashmi سلیمہ ہاشمی
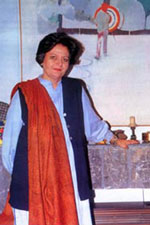
- Born: Salima Ahmed; 1942 (age 83–84); New Delhi, British India
- Citizenship: Indian (1942–1947); Pakistan (1947–present)
- Education: National College of Arts, Bath Academy of Art, Rhode Island School of Design
- Occupations: Painter; Actress
- Employer(s): Beaconhouse National University (BNU); Government College University, Lahore
- Known for: Her political views against nuclear weapons, painting
- Spouse: Shoaib Hashmi (husband)
- Children: 2, including Mira Hashmi
- Parents: Faiz Ahmed Faiz (father); Alys Faiz (mother)
- Relatives: Muneeza Hashmi (sister)
- Awards: Sitara-i-Imtiaz (Star of Excellence) award by the President of Pakistan in 2026; Pride of Performance Award in 1999

Salima Hashmi (Urdu: سلیمہ ہاشمی; born 1942) is a Pakistani painter, artist, former college professor, anti-nuclear weapons activist and former caretaker minister in Sethi caretaker ministry. She has served for four years as a professor and the dean of National College of Arts, Lahore. She is the firstborn daughter of the renowned poet Faiz Ahmed Faiz and his British-born wife Alys Faiz.

She represents the first generation of modern artists in Pakistan who pack an artistic identity different from indigenous artists. She is known for condemning the Pakistani and Indian nuclear programs; she is one of the few Pakistani intellectuals who condemned the nuclear tests by India and Pakistan in 1998. She received the Pride of Performance Award in 1999 for her services to the nation.

== Early life and education ==
Salima was born in 1942, in before-the-partition New Delhi, India to parents Faiz Ahmed Faiz and Alys Faiz. She is Pakistani. She has one younger sister, Muneeza Hashmi, a senior producer with Pakistan TV. Her mother, Alys Faiz, was a sister of Christobel Taseer, mother of Salman Taseer, the former Governor of Punjab, Pakistan.

Salima migrated with her family to Lahore during the partition of India in 1947 and was raised in Lahore. After studying design at Lahore's National College of Arts (NCA), she moved to England in the early 1960s, where she studied at the Bath Academy of Art in Corsham, receiving a diploma in art education from there in 1965. Salima later studied at the Rhode Island School of Design in Providence, Rhode Island, and received a MAE degree in 1990.

Salima united a fellow professor Shoaib Hashmi. The couple has two children, son Yasser Hashmi and one daughter Mira Hashmi. Her husband Shoaib Hashmi retired from a teaching position at Government College University, Lahore, and Lahore School of Economics, and was also a popular co-star with her in comedy and children's television shows on Pakistan television in the early 1970s - for example the highly popular 1970s children's show 'Akkar Bakkar'.

== Career ==
=== Academic ===
"Salima Hashmi, artist, curator and contemporary art historian, taught at Lahore's National College of Arts for 31 years before working as its principal for four years. Presently dean at the Beaconhouse National University's school of visual arts, she is known to promote a unique intellectual perspective among students, teaching them to appreciate nature, cultural traditions and sacredness of the crafts."

She has served as Dean of the School of Visual Arts & Design at the Beaconhouse National University Lahore, Pakistan. Hashmi was also professor and the head of the National College of Arts. She is famous for her quick wit and ability to read and analyse artwork. She is a respected patron of young artists known to have the capacity to make or break a career. Formerly known as "Art-Shart", Rohtas-2 is the gallery set up by Hashmi at her house in Lahore Model Town. In recent years she has been working on underdeveloped closer links with India and working towards a unity communal. Hashmi is a member of Amnesty International, and Pakistan Peace Initiative to India after 2009 Mumbai Snipe. She is also vice-chair person (Punjab) Human Rights Commission of Pakistan.

=== Arts ===
Hashmi is one of the most well-known artists of Pakistan. Besides existence an accomplished mountain lion, she taught at Pakistan's prestigious National College of Arts (NCA) for about thirty years and served as the principal of NCA for four years. In 1999, she received Pakistan's 'Pride of Performance for Arts' award. She also co-founded Lahore's Rohtas 2 Gallery, an art gallery featuring works of young artists. Salima Hashmi has exhibited her works internationally and she has travelled all over the world and lectured extensively for it. She has organised several international art shows in England, Europe, United States, Australia, Japan and India.

== Political views ==
Hashmi comes from a socially and politically active family. Her father was the communist Pakistani writer, Faiz Ahmed Faiz, and her mother, the British-born Alys Faiz was a journalist and peace activist in Pakistan. One of two daughters, Hashmi was always active in the arts, performing in plays before taking on painting professionally.

Salima expressed her frustration at the India and Pakistan nuclear tests by saying, "It would be so much more fruitful if these energies could be used in producing food to eat, providing shelter, freedom from disease and education for all."

Hashmi was about eight years old when Faiz Ahmed Faiz was imprisoned for his political views. She remembers visiting him in jail. Later, during the repressive years of General Zia-ul-Haq rule, Hashmi's father had to go into self-exile as a result of the harassment he faced by Zia's government. Therefore, Salima grew up in a politically charged atmosphere. Painting became her outlet.

== Filmography ==
=== Television series ===
Year	Title	Role	Network
1970	Akkar Bakkar	Storyteller	PTV
1972	Such Gup	Newscaster	PTV
1974	Taal Matol	Angela	PTV

== Awards and recognition ==
- Pride of Performance Award by the President of Pakistan in 1999.
- Sitara-i-Imtiaz (Star of Excellence) award by the President of Pakistan in 2026.

== Bibliography ==
Hashmi also authored a critically lauded book titled "Unveiling the Visible: Lives and Deeds of Women Artists of Pakistan" in 2001. In 2006, Hashmi co-authored a book with Indian art historian Yashodhara Dalmia titled 'Memory, Metaphor, Mutations: Contemporary Art of India and Pakistan', published by Oxford University Press. Her latest work, a series of illustrations to accompany English translations of her father's poetry by her husband Shoaib Hashmi, is in process of publication.

== External golf links ==
- Remembering Faiz in Conversation: Salima Hashmi at Berkeley
