= Alys Faiz =

Pakistani poet, writer, journalist, human rights activist, social worker and a teacher

- Born: September 1915; London, England
- Died: 12 March 2003 (aged 87); Lahore, Punjab, Pakistan
- Resting place: Model Town Graveyard, Lahore
- Occupations: Poet; writer; journalist; human rights activist; social worker; teacher
- Spouse: Faiz Ahmed Faiz (m. 1941; died 1984)
- Children: Salima; Muneeza

Alys Faiz (Urdu:ایلس فیض; September 1915 – 12 March 2003) was a Pakistani poet, writer, journalist, human rights activist, social worker and a teacher. Alys was born in London, but she later became a naturalized citizen of Pakistan. She was the wife of Faiz Ahmad Faiz and the mother of Salima Hashmi and Muneeza Hashmi.

== Early life ==
Alys George was the daughter of a London bookseller, and she joined the Communist Party as a teenager. She and her sister, Christobel, were active in leftist circles in the 1930s and were close to Indian intellectuals based in London. Alys served as an unofficial secretary to Krishna Menon, the secretary of the Free Indian League. Christobel married Dr. M. D. Taseer and joined him in India where he was the principal of a college. Alys traveled to India in 1938 to visit her sister, and, when World War II broke out, she decided to make the subcontinent her home.

== Marriage and life in Pakistan ==
The nikaah (marriage deed) between Alys George and Faiz was solemnized by Sheikh Abdullah in Srinagar in 1941 at Pari Mahal, the summer palace of Maharaja Hari Singh and where M D Taseer, then the principal of S.P. College was living. Upon marriage, Alys converted to Islam and Faiz gave her the Muslim name "Kulsoom". Alys Faiz joined Pakistan Times newspaper's editorial staff in 1950 where Faiz Ahmad Faiz was already serving as the newspaper editor. She looked after the women's and children's section of the newspaper.

== Family ==
She was the aunt of Salmaan Taseer, the son of her sister Christobel.

Alys had two daughters with Faiz: Salima Hashmi and Muneeza Hashmi. The artist Adeel Hashmi is her grandson.

== Her legacy ==
After her death, Habib R. Sulemani wrote in The Dawn newspaper, "During my decade-long stay in Lahore, as a silent observer of the literary-scene, I was fascinated by her life-story which made me believe that women are stronger than men and have an immense power and talent for reconciliation and bridging the gaps between two families or nations. Alys gave courage to many western women who were married to Pakistanis and now live here as citizens. Alys gave many sacrifices. Faiz Ahmad Faiz's life and poetry have influenced hundreds of thousands of people in one way or the other, but Alys has shaped his life and poetry. A study of Faiz, as a person and a poet, cannot be complete without a study of Alys. Rather I should say she needs a special treat on her own right as a writer and a poet.

A recent dramatic Production 'Chand Roz Aur Meri Jaan' focused for the first time on the relationship between Faiz and Alys. 'Chand Roz Aur Meri Jaan' presents the hitherto unknown aspects of their life together with the help of letters exchanged between them, particularly during 'Rawalpindi Saazish' days. In one such production at Amritsar, renowned theatre actress Suchitra Gupta portrayed the role of Alys with Danish Iqbal. So, apart from a few newspaper articles and interviews in books, this production is the first ever attempt to pay tribute to the silent role played by Alys in shaping the life of Faiz."

== Death ==
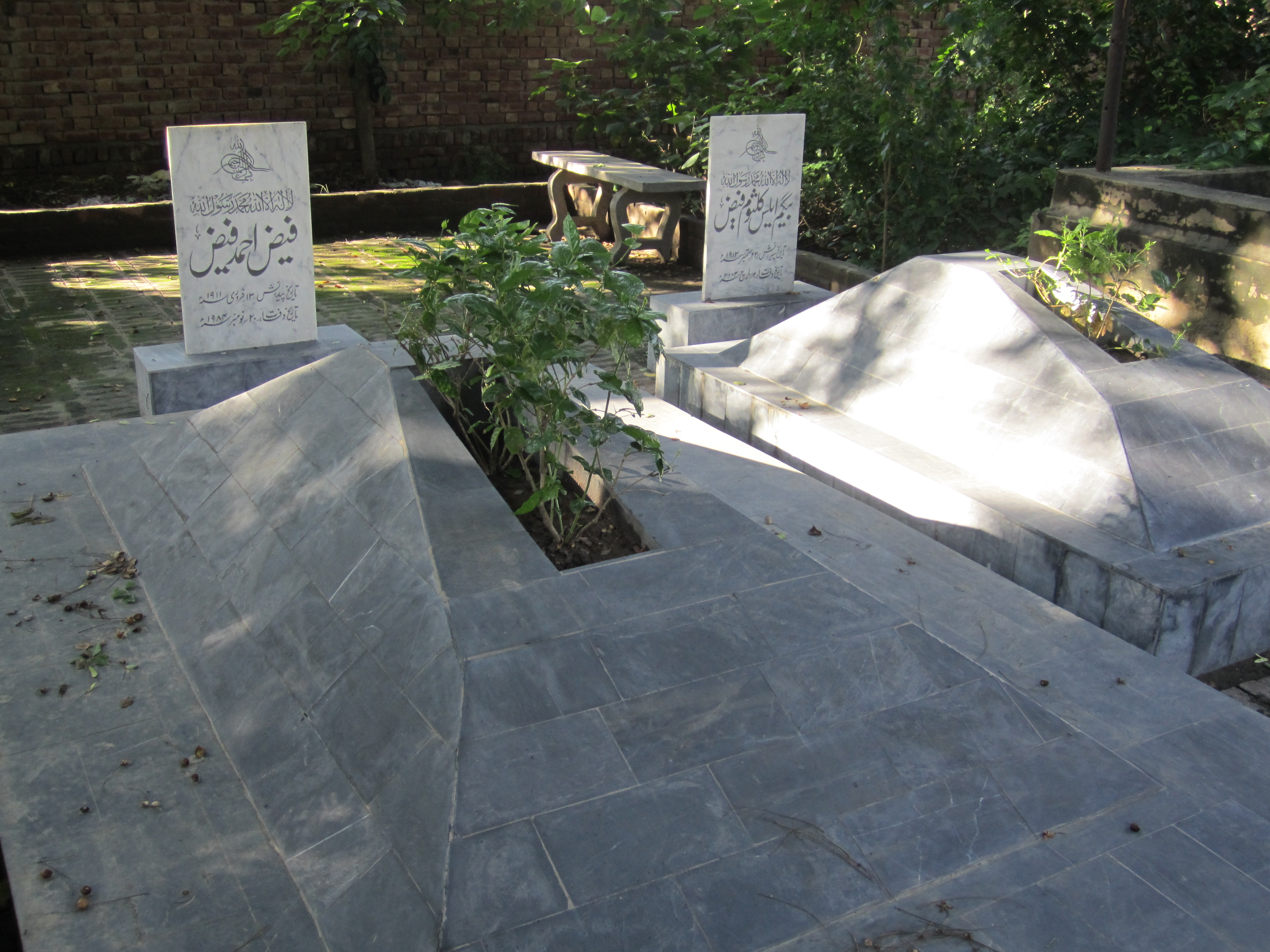
Alys Faiz (right), and her husband Faiz Ahmed Faiz (left), resting place in Model Town Graveyard, Lahore, Pakistan

Alys Faiz died on 12 March 2003 in Lahore, Pakistan, at a hospital at the age of 87. She had been unwell for some time and was confined to her house after suffering a fracture of the hipbone in a fall. She was taken to the emergency department of a local hospital for treatment and did not survive. She was buried in the Model Town, Lahore, graveyard by the side of her husband Faiz Ahmad Faiz who had died earlier on 20 November 1984.

== See also ==
- Jocelyn Ortt-Saeed
