= Shoaib Hashmi =

Pakistani playwright (1938–2023)

- شعیب ہاشمی
- Born: 12 July 1938
- Died: 15 May 2023 (aged 84); Lahore, Punjab, Pakistan
- Occupations: Educator, playwright, television actor
- Known for: PTV comedy shows of the 1970s
- Spouse: Salima Hashmi
- Children: 2, Mira Hashmi and Yasser Hashmi
- Awards: Pride of Performance Award by the President of Pakistan in 1995; Tamgha-e-Imtiaz Award (Medal of Excellence)

Shoaib Hashmi (Urdu: شعیب ہاشمی; 12 July 1938 – 15 May 2023) was a Pakistani playwright, actor and academic.

== Career ==
Hashmi received his Master of Arts degree in economics from Government College Lahore (now Government College University), Lahore and his MSc. degree from London School of Economics (LSE), London He also studied theater at the Royal Academy of Dramatic Arts, London.

Hashmi taught economics for many years at Government College Lahore and later taught at Lahore School of Economics.

== Personal life ==
Hashmi was married to Salima Hashmi, the daughter of noted Pakistani poet Faiz Ahmed Faiz. The couple had two children Yasser Hashmi and actress Mira Hashmi.

== Death ==
Hashimi died on 15 May 2023, at the age of 84 due to a prolonged and extended illness. He reportedly suffered a brain haemorrhage 12 years ago after which he never fully recovered. Prior to his death, he had been sick and paralysed, with difficulty in walking and talking. He received treatment in Lahore, Pakistan.

According to a major newspaper of Pakistan, "His humble, warm and unassuming demeanor was among the most remarkable aspects of his personality".

== Works ==
=== Television serials ===
He wrote the following comedy TV serials for Ptv, which originally aired in the 1970s. He was widely considered as one of the pioneers of Ptv.

- Akkar Bakkar (1970s Ptv comedy show designed to educate children)
- Sach Gupp (1970s Ptv comedy show)
- Taal Matol (1970s Ptv comedy show)
- Balila - banned soon after it aired.
- Bau Train - (1990 Ptv drama)
- Jutt And Bond - (2001 sitcom)

=== Newspaper columnist ===
- 'Taal Matol' newspaper column in The News International newspaper on Sundays. He also wrote columns for Gulf News.

=== Book translator ===
Hashmi translated a few books from Urdu to English, notably A song for this day: 52 poems by Pakistani noted poet Faiz Ahmed Faiz.

== Awards ==
- Pride of Performance Award by the President of Pakistan in 1995.
- Tamgha-i-Imtiaz (Medal of Excellence) Award by the Government of Pakistan.
