= Javed Jabbar =

Pakistani writer and politician

- جاوید جبار
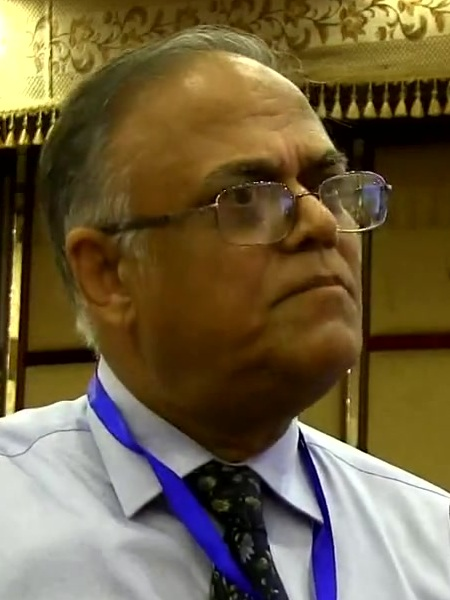
- Jabbar in 2015
- Born: 1945 (age 80–81); Hyderabad State, British India
- Occupations: Writer; Politician; Filmmaker; Advertising executive
- Years active: 1960s–present
- Children: Mehreen Jabbar (daughter)
- Relatives: Yasir Akhtar (nephew); Ayaz Naik (nephew)

Javed Jabbar (Urdu: جاوید جبار) is a Pakistani writer, filmmaker and politician.

== Early life and education ==
Jabbar's father Ahmed Abdul Jabbar was under the employment of Hyderabad State; they migrated to Pakistan after India annexed the state. His mother Zain Mahal Khursheed was a trained sitar player. Jabbar credits both of them for inculcating his interest in art and literature.

In 1961, Jabbar enrolled in the Humanities section of St Patrick's High School, Karachi; he credited Principal D'Arcy D'Souza with convincing his father into shifting him from the Commerce section, where he was first enrolled. In 1963, Jabbar enrolled at the University of Karachi for his undergraduate degree in International Relations. During his university days, as an actor, he was a reputed face in theatrical circuits, with well-received roles in stage plays such as Julius Caesar (as Cassius) in 1963, The Man Who Came to Dinner in 1965, You Can't Take It With You in 1964 and The Promise in 1969.

== Career ==
=== Advertisement, documentaries and films ===
Jabbar chose to be employed in the advertisement sector instead of journalism, guided by better prospects of earning. He went on to direct over 300 commercials. In 1972, Jabbar produced Moenjodaro: The City That Must Not Die, a documentary for Pakistan Television (PTV). A chronicle of the Indus Valley Civilisation, it secured the first international award for PTV as it won the Silver Prize at the Asian Film Festival in Shiraz, Iran as well a national award. He has also directed 10 other documentaries.

In 1976, he wrote and directed Beyond the Last Mountain, the first feature film in English out of Pakistan. In 2008, he wrote and produced Ramchand Pakistani, an Urdu drama film directed by his daughter. The film focuses on the ordeals of a Pakistani Dalit Hindu, who had crossed the border to India.

=== Politics ===
In 1985, spurred by his wife and friends, Jabbar successfully ran for the four seats reserved for technocrats in Pakistan Senate under the martial rule of Zia-ul-Haq. He won re-elections in 1997; he even became a Minister of State of Information in the Musharraf ministry before resigning in 2000. In 2003, he tried to be reelected but failed to obtain any proposer. From 2015 to 2018, Jabbar served as a member of the Senate Forum for Policy Research, described as Pakistan's first parliamentary think tank, where he contributed to policy-oriented research and discussion.

=== Literature ===
Javed Jabbar has authored 19 books, including anthologies. His published work covers themes of politics, national identity, media, and public policy. The third edition of his book Pakistan—Unique Origins; Unique Destiny? was released in 2017; it has also been published in Urdu and Sindhi translations. His anthology Pathways: Selected Writings received the UBL Literary Award for Best Non-Fiction English Book at the 9th edition of the Karachi Literature Festival in 2018. Several editions of his book What Is Pakistaniat?: 41 Elements of the Unique Pakistani National Identity have been prescribed in the curricula of various educational and training institutions in Pakistan. Jabbar has also been writing op-eds and columns for leading newspapers such as Dawn.

== Views ==
=== Pakistan ===
==== Islam ====
Jabbar believes that the prominent strand of Islam followed in Pakistan is Sufism, "pluralistic, inclusive, tolerant, [and] respectful." Rejecting that Pakistani society has any major issue of radicalization, he warns against conflating the "overwhelming majority" of peaceful and resilient Pakistanis with "a small number of brainwashed barbarians." He argues that most Pakistanis respect other religions since otherwise, colleges run by Christian missionaries won't have got thousands of students or religio-political parties would have won elections; acts of violence upon accusations of blasphemy were rare.

Jabbar rejects contentions that Pakistan is a failed state; he remains hopeful that Pakistan will successfully see through the unique challenges of being founded on the basis of religion yet not give in to religious extremism or Islamicise the state to even-greater extents. He asks his fellow citizens to enroll for a high-quality education, engage in ijtihad, and follow a "50 points formula" in their quest for rediscovering and redefining Pakistaniat.

==== Media ====
In 2016, Jabbar supported PEMRA's proscription on broadcasting Indian media in Pakistan. Jabbar believes the state to offer "very high levels of freedom of expression" to media despite the rare blips.

=== India ===
Jabbar blames India's maneuvers in the immediate aftermath of the Partition, the 1947 Kashmir War, to have influenced Pakistan into becoming a "security-oriented state." He hopes that India will engage with Pakistan more meaningfully and without holding discussions hostage to "[Pakistan's] cessation of support for terrorism, while India does it self."

He has served as chairman of the Social Policy and Development Centre, a Pakistan-based policy research organization, and has been a participant since 1992 in the Neemrana Initiative, a long-running Track II dialogue between Pakistan and India involving former officials and civil society representatives.

=== 1971 and Bangladesh ===
Writing in 2012 and 2020 on the breakup of Pakistan following the 1971 war, which resulted in the creation of Bangladesh. Jabbar examines the historical causes and enduring legacy of the conflict, arguing that Pakistan's original geopolitical structure, with two geographically separated wings, was inherently unstable. He asserts that while Pakistan's official narrative often emphasizes external involvement, particularly by India in the conflict, there has been insufficient internal consensus and acknowledgment of the excesses committed against Bengalis during the war. He suggests that revisiting attitudes toward 1971, including offering an unqualified apology to Bangladesh, could help improve bilateral relations. He proposes increased diplomatic, cultural, academic, and civil society engagement between Pakistan and Bangladesh to foster a more constructive future.

== Personal life ==
Jabbar is married to Shabnam. They have a son named Kamal and a daughter Mehreen Jabbar who is a film producer and director.

== Selected filmography ==
Year	Title	Writer	Director	Producer	Notes
1972	Moenjodaro: The City That Must Not Die	Yes	Yes	—	Documentary
1976	Beyond the Last Mountain	Yes	Yes	Yes	Feature film
2008	Ramchand Pakistani	Yes	—	Yes	Feature film
2021	Separation of East Pakistan: The Untold Story	Yes	Yes	—	Documentary

== Selected bibliography ==
- Pakistan: Unique Origins; Unique Destiny? (2011), National Book Foundation.
- What Is Pakistaniat?: 41 Elements of the Unique Pakistani National Identity (2019), Paramount Books.
- “But, Prime Minister…”: Interactions with Benazir Bhutto, the World’s First Muslim Woman Prime Minister (2021), Paramount Books.
- A President, a Prime Minister and a Party: Interactions with Farooq Leghari, Meraj Khalid — and the Millat Party (2022), Paramount Books.
- A General in Particular: Interactions with Pervez Musharraf (2022), Paramount Books.
- Streams: Selected Writings 2016–2023 on Media, South Asia, Development and Personalities (2024), Paramount Books.
