= List of Pakistani artists =

The following list of notable Pakistani artists (in alphabetical order by last name) includes artists of various genres, who are notable and are either born in Pakistan, of Pakistani descent or who produce works that are primarily about Pakistan.

== A ==
- Lubna Agha (1949–2012), painter
- Zubeida Agha (1922–1997), painter
- Anna Molka Ahmed (1917–1994), artist and pioneer of fine arts
- Bashir Ahmed (born 1953), miniature painter, sculptor, pioneer bachelor's degree curriculum for miniature painting
- Zahoor ul Akhlaq (1941–1999), painter, sculptor
- Saeed Akhtar (born 1938), painter
- Shakir Ali (1914–1975), painter
- Ajaz Anwar (born 1946), painter especially of watercolours

== B ==
- Ustad Allah Baksh (1895–1978)
- Jamil Baloch (born 1972), sculptor
- Huma Bhabha (born 1962), sculptor
- Saeed Ahmad Bodla (born 1944), artist and calligrapher

== C ==
- Abdur Rahman Chughtai (1899–1975), painter in the Chughtai Style of Art and stamp designer
- Ruby Chishti (born 1963) textile artist, sculptor

== D ==
- Colin David (1937–2008), painter

== G ==
- Saadia Gardezi, painter and cartoonist
- Ismail Gulgee (1926–2007), painter, calligrapher

== H ==
- Salima Hashmi (born 1942), painter, author and art educator

== I ==
- Khalid Iqbal (1929–2014), painter, art teacher, professor emeritus
- Askari Mian Irani (1940–2004), painter

== J ==
- Murtaza Jafri (born 1958), painter known for NCA Lahore principal
- Zehra Laila Javeri (born 1971), painter

== K ==
- Muhammad Arshad Khan (born 1969)
- Gul Muhammad Khatri (1919–1979), painter
- Sanki King (born 1990), artist, painter, muralist, graffiti/sneaker/street artist

== M ==
- Anwar Maqsood (born 1940), intellectual, playwright, poet, television host, satirist, humorist, and long time painter
- Muniba Mazari (born 1987), painter, model, and activist
- Eqbal Mehdi (1946–2008), painter, illustrator
- Hasnat Mehmood (born 1978), visual artist, teaches at National College of Arts; lives in Lahore
- Bashir Mirza (1941–2000), painter
- Quddus Mirza (born 1961), painter, art critic
- Huma Mulji (born 1970), sculptor

== N ==
- Abdul Rahim Nagori (1939–2010), painter known for his socio-political themes
- Jamil Naqsh (1938–2019), painter

== P ==
- Faizan Peerzada (1958–2012), artist, puppeteer, theatre director
- Ahmed Pervez (1926–1979), painter and winner of the President's Medal for Pride of Performance

== Q ==
- Farooq Qaiser (1945–2021), graphic designer, puppeteer, TV director
- Tazeen Qayyum (born 1973), painter, conceptual artist
- Ayessha Quraishi (born 1970), contemporary artist

== R ==
- Sughra Rababi, (1922–1994), painter, designer, sculptor
- Rashid Rana (born 1968), visual artist and art educator

== S ==
- Sadequain (1923–1987), painter
- Arbab Mohammad Sardar (born 1945), painter and sculptor, pride of performance
- Hiba Schahbaz (born 1981), painter
- Jamal Shah (born 1956), actor, director, painter, and social worker
- Haji Muhammad Sharif (1889-1978), miniature painter and teacher
- Anwar Shemza (1928–1985), artist, writer, printmaker
- Madiha Sikander (born 1987), multimedia artist
- Shazia Sikander (born 1969), miniature artist
- Tassaduq Sohail (1930–2017), painter and short story writer
- Fakeero Solanki, sculptor
- Raja Changez Sultan (born 1949), painter, poet

== T ==
- Sumaira Tazeen (born 1973), neo miniature artist, multidisciplinary

== W ==
- Saira Wasim (born 1975), miniature artist

== Y ==
- Yousuf Bashir Qureshi (born 1971), fashion designer, photographer, painter, actor, musician, poet

== Z ==
- Ahmad Zoay (1947–2014), painter and sculptor
- Rabia Zuberi (born c. 1940), sculptor, painter.
