= List of Pakistani women artists =

The following list of Pakistani women artists (in alphabetical order by last name) includes artists of various genres, who are notable and are either born in Pakistan, of Pakistani descent or who produce works that are primarily about Pakistan.

== A ==
- Humaira Abid (active since 2000s), wood artist
- Lubna Agha (1949–2012), painter, educator, art director
- Zubeida Agha (1922–1997), Modernist painter
- Anna Molka Ahmed (1917–1995), painter, educator
- Sheherezade Alam (born 1948), ceramist

== B ==
- Huma Bhabha (born 1962), sculptor
- Ambreen Butt (born 1969), Pakistani-American artist

== C ==
- Ruby Chishti (born 1963), Pakistani-American artist

== J ==
- Mehreen Jabbar (born 1971), television and film director
- Misha Japanwala, sculptor and fashion designer
- Zehra Laila Javeri (born 1971), painter

== K ==
- Aisha Khalid (born 1972), contemporary artist

== L ==
- Laila Khan (Singer)

== M ==
- Muniba Mazari (born 1987), painter, writer, activist
- Huma Mulji (born 1970), sculptor, photographer

== N ==
- Nigar Nazar (born 1953), Pakistan's first female cartoonist

== Q ==
- Tazeen Qayyum (born 1973), Pakistani-Canadian conceptual artist
- Ayessha Quraishi (born 1970), contemporary artist

== R ==
- Sughra Rababi (1922–1994), painter, designer, sculptor

== S ==
- Huma Safdar (fl 1980s), arts teacher, artist
- Hiba Schahbaz (born 1981), painter
- Laila Shahzada (1926–1994), painter
- Madiha Sikander (born 1987), multimedia artist
- Shahzia Sikander (born 1969), painter, animator
- Shamim Nazli (1940–2010), music director

== T ==
- Sumaira Tazeen (born 1973), Canada-based Pakistani contemporary miniature artist

== W ==
- Saira Wasim (born 1975), painter

== See also ==
- List of Pakistani artists
