= Xing Danwen =

Chinese artist and photographer

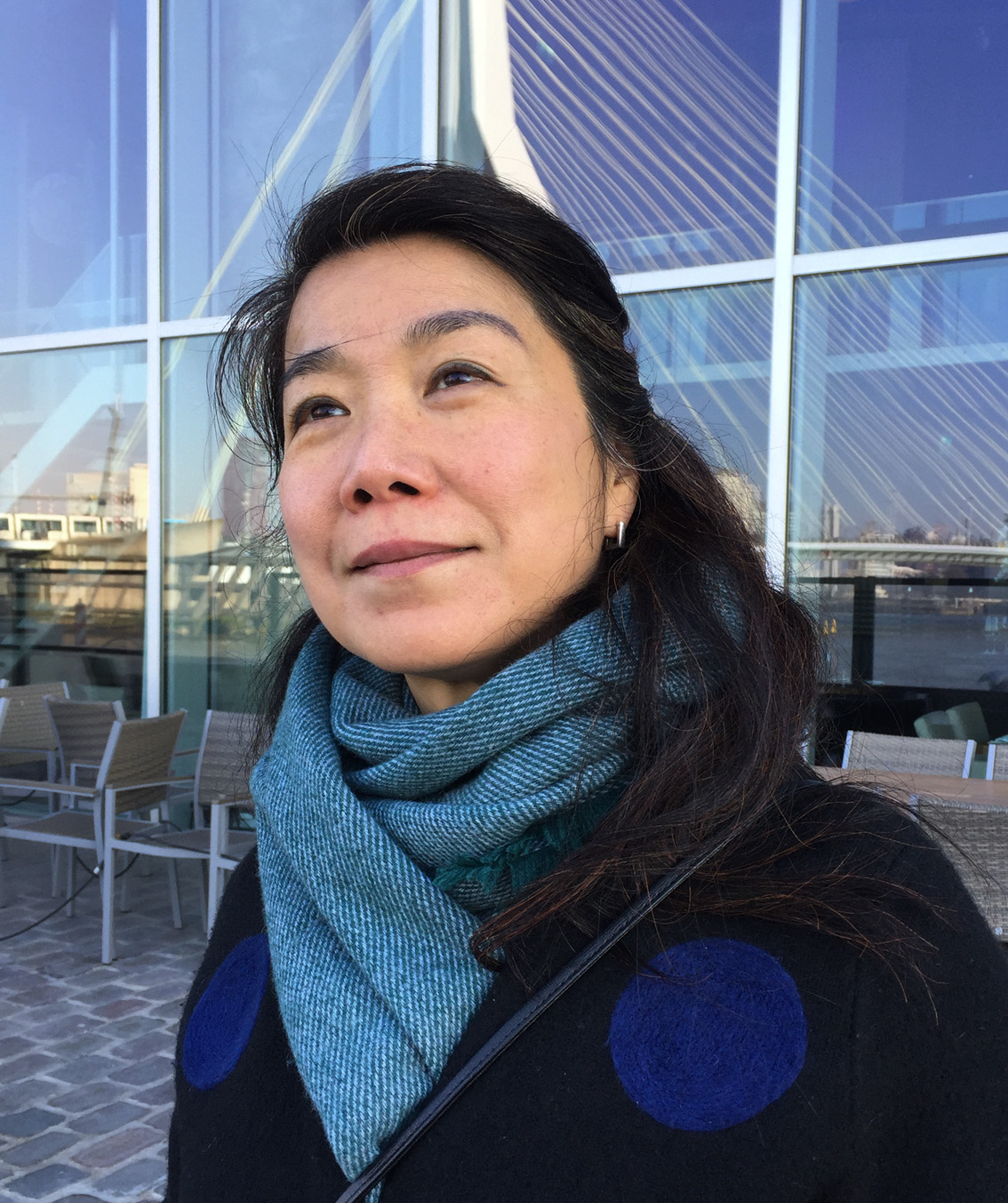
- Xing Danwen
- Born: 1967 (age 58–59); Xi'an, China
- Occupation: Artist
- Notable work: Born with Cultural Revolution, I am a woman, SCROLL, Sleep Walkin
- Website: www.danwen.com

Xing Danwen (Chinese: 邢丹文; born 1967) is a contemporary Chinese artist and photographer. She is known for the images she made during and after her MFA at the School of Visual Arts in New York, exploring ideas of dislocation as well as the form and psyche of contemporary living.

== Biography ==
=== Early life ===
Xing Danwen was born in 1967 in Xi'an, Shaanxi Province, China. Her parents worked as engineers in a state-owned energy company.

=== Education ===
The artist started her visual art practice with painting medium in her teens. From 1982 to 1986, she studied painting at the art school affiliated to Xi'an Academy of Fine Arts. From 1989 to 1992, she continued painting and earned her BFA in oil painting at the Central Academy of Fine Art.

In the late 1980s, she was drawn to photography. Self-taught in photography, she was one of a few artists in the late '80s and '90s in China exploring the boundaries of photography and using photography as an art form. Through the camera, she observed and challenged the questions on Chinese society, humanity, female identity and the generation born in the '60s. Xing documented the performance art movement among the East Village artists in Beijing in the early 1990s.

In 1998, she went to New York with a grant and fellowship from the Asian Cultural Council, New York. There, she did her MFA at the School of Visual Arts in New York with a chairman grant from SVA from 1998 to 2001.

This New York period challenged and enriched her artistic experience. In her current art practice she works, besides photography, also in the field of mixed media, video and multi-media installations.

Her artistic practice is both rich and varied and her subjects include: Dislocation between cultural status, conflicts between globalization and traditions, problematic environmental issues, the urban drama between the desire and reality. Fiction, truth and illusion often play an important role in her works.

=== Career ===
One of Xing's first major works was the series disConnexion (2002–03), large-scale photographs of wires, circuit boards, and other computer waste exported from the United States to China's Guangdong Province.

Xing began her series Urban Fiction in 2004, which features photographs of architectural maquettes that Xing encountered at real-estate developers’ offices into which she inserted cutout figures that are enacting a scene of domestic drama. Urban Fiction has been exhibited at the Metropolitan Museum of Art, as part of the exhibition "Ink Art: Past as Present in Contemporary China", and at Harvard University's Fairbank Center for Chinese Studies.

In 2007, Xing continued her exploration of urban architecture and her relationship to the city of Beijing through the series Wall House.

== Major artworks ==
=== A Personal Diary ===
1993–2003, Photographs

In A Personal Diary, Xing presents a highly poetic work that evinces her acute ability to inscribe China's alternative art scene in the 1990s into her own personal narrative.

She represents her city through an eye disturbed by rapid urban development. It calls artists and their artworks from their studios to the streets, it witnesses the emergence of installation art in public spaces, and it accompanies and connects with performers in private apartments, evincing a strong, sensual closeness to them. The camera is frequently visible in the photographs, and so is the artist herself, as she captures people and events with passion for what is portrayed.

=== Born with Cultural Revolution ===
1995, B/W Photographs. Featured in ANU/Verso 2019 publication Afterlives of Chinese Communism edited by Christian Sorace, Ivan Fraceschini, nad Nicholas Lumbere.

=== I am a woman ===
1994–1996, B/W Photographs

=== SCROLL ===
1999–2000, B/W Photographs

Scroll is a series of panoramic photos of Beijing composed of many images that were shot in succession on 120 mm film. This method resulted in photos that are exceptionally long, narrow, and horizontal. The images were shot manually, without any computer manipulation or digitization. Danwen Xing relied on the film's original data, which she assembles into the final work.

Scroll A focuses on daily life and human activities in public spaces and Scroll B captures scenes of Beijing streets and buildings, resulting in haunting and poetic abstract images.

=== Sleep walking ===
2001, two-channel video installation

In Sleep Walking, Xing examines the effect of dislocation and how the mind can blur the distinctions between the past and the present, reality and fiction. The video weaves together images from different Western cityscapes accompanied by a soundtrack composed with Chinese traditional instruments and sounds of daily life in Chinese cities. The work implies a sense of loss and displacement, and evokes contending memories. Xing reconstructs reality, creating vigorous images infused with her visions of European Old Master paintings, the realities of these cities, and personal audial and visual memories.

=== disCONNEXION ===
2002–2003, Color Photographs

Xing's concerns are not only related to large cities. She has traveled to southern China to explore the effects of electronic trash recycling on villages and small cities in the Pearl River Delta in Guangdong Province. In disCONNEXION, her critical eye and sharp lens examine the aesthetics of technological waste, reflecting environmental concerns, but more importantly, an anxiety about changes in the lives of workers along the south coast, whose ghosts can be sensed despite their absence from the frames.

=== Duplication ===
2003, Color Photographs

DUPLICATION is a photography series staged in different toy factories across South China. Danwen Xing observed the entire toy production process and how designs are made for the international market to match the desires of people in every corner of the world. The toys are made to represent ideal beauty, but Xing deconstructs this by focusing her critical lens on the process and exploring the aesthetics of the identical parts.

Although the photos show only a fraction of the huge quantities of toy parts made in the factories, the work urges the eye to examine their differences and search for individuality.

=== Urban Fiction ===
2004–present, photography with digital manipulation

In Urban Fiction, the city becomes unreal, synthetic, and almost empty of its inhabitants. The artist inserts theatrical scenes into a series of photographs of promotional models used by real estate companies, with her as the main actor in playful, fictitious incidents. Hovering between reality and fantasy, the scenes compensate for the sense of emptiness in exponentially-expanding cities.

=== Wall House ===
2007, Multimedia installation with photographs and video projection

In Wall House, Xing stages herself inside a building designed by John Hejduk in the Netherlands, and her lonely presence draws its magic from the urban landscapes of Chinese cities seen from the windows of the space. Captivated by her passion for the city, she summons it, and questions the reality of the borders between public, private, and subjective spaces.

=== Because I am in the Mountains ===
2017, Installation with coal-coke and mixed materials

This sculpture presents a panoramic miniature of a contemporary landscape made from coal coke, the synthetic material that results from burning coal. In this work, Danwen Xing creates a contrast between the polluting medium and the scene depicted. Confusion is triggered by the divergence between the apparent disaster that is contemporary life and the beautiful vision of a natural landscape from traditional Chinese ink art. Xing expresses clear concern for the threatened nature, but more importantly, she borrows a phrase from Chinese philosophy: standing on Mount Lu means that one cannot see its true face. She engages with a visible symbolic complex, recognizing that it is impossible to observe objectively when we are lost within ourselves.

=== Thread ===
2017, Two-channel video with Sound, HD, 10 mins

In this new work, Thread, Xing examines the complexity of communication and connection between people. The artist and her mother serve as the main characters. On one screen are the aged hands of the artist's mother, insistently knitting a dress with love and care, and on the other, the daughter wears the dress as it unravels with her movement. A feeling of liberation is evoked as the daughter's body slowly becomes exposed but also fragile, and vulnerable. The daughter is trapped in the thread, but she moves forward with an uncontrolled drive. Although the two actions are separate and seem contradictory, the viewer senses a complicity between mother and daughter, as if they share an unspoken, secret understanding.

== Exhibitions ==
Selected exhibitions include Seeing Utopia, Past and Future-Wang Di and Xing Danwen, Fairbank Center for Chinese Studies, Harvard University, US, 2010; In A Perfect World..., Ooi Botos Gallery, Hong Kong, 2009; Wall House, project space at Gallery Barry Keldoulis, Sydney, Australia, 2008; disCONNEXION, Kiang Gallery, Atlanta, US, 2004; and Urban Fiction, Galerie Piece Unique, Paris, France, 2004.

=== Solo and two person exhibitions ===
2017

- A Personal Diary, Warsaw MOMA, Poland
- Captive of Love, Red Brick Art Museum, Beijing, China

2014

- UTOPIA, Officine dell'Immagine, Milan, Italy

2010

- A Personal Diary, Haines Gallery, San Francisco, US
- Chinese Modernism and U.S. Vernacular-Xing Danwen & Jim Vecchi, arCH-Architecture Center Houston Foundation, US
- Seeing Utopia, Past and Future-Xing Danwen & Wang Di, Fairbank Center for Chinese Studies, Harvard University, US
- A Personal Diary, Modern Chinese Art Foundation, Gent, Belgium

2009

- A Personal Diary-China Avant-garde in 1990s, Modern Chinese Art Foundation, Gent, Belgium
- A Round Trip, Galerie SOLLERTIS, Toulouse, France
- Between the Walls, EPsite, Shanghai, China

2008

- The City Fairy, Korea Art Center, Busan, Korea
- Wall House, Project Space at Gallery Barry Keldoulis, Sydney, Australia
- Xing Danwen & Zeng Han, FOTOFEST 2008, Berring & James Gallery, Houston, US

2007

- Roland Fischer/Xing Danwen", Galerie Sollertis, Toulouse, France

2006

- Urban Fiction, Gallery TPW, Toronto, Canada
- disCONNEXION/duplication, the Chinese Museum, Melbourne, Australia

2004

- disCONNEXION, Kiang Gallery, Atlanta, US
- dis+dup, Gow Langsford gallery, Sydney, Australia
- Urban Fiction, Galerie Piece Unique, Paris, France

2002

- Dislocation, the 2nd PingYao International PhotoFestival, Shanxi, China
- China Avant-garde", Ka-sing Lee gallery, Toronto, Canada

2001

- Xing Danwen, Photo Festival at Galerie du château, Nice, France

1997

- IN SIGHT, SOHO Photo Gallery, New York, US

1994

- WITH CHINESE EYES, PHOTONEWS at Gallery Grauwert, Hamburg, Germany

== Public collections ==
- Whitney Museum of American Art, New York
- The Progressive Corporation, US
- JGS Foundation, New York
- Estella Collection, New York
- Santa Barbara Museum of Art, US
- ICP, International Center for Photography, New York
- Smart Museum of Art, Chicago
- San Francisco Museum of Modern Art, San Francisco
- The J. Paul Getty Museum, Los Angeles
- The Metropolitan Museum of Art, New York
- The Iris & B. Gerald Cantor Center for Visual Arts at Stanford University, US
- Groupe Lhoist, Belgium
- Dr. Sigg Collection, Switzerland
- UBS, Union Bank of Switzerland
- Centre Pompidou, Paris, France
- FNAC / Fonds National d'art Contemporain, France
- The Red Mansion Foundation, London
- Victoria and Albert Museum, London
- Groninger Museum, The Netherlands
- Busan Art Museum, Korea
- Singapore Art Museum, Singapore
- Guangdong Museum of Art, Guangzhou, China
- Red Brick Art Museum, Beijing, China

== Grants, awards and fellowships ==
- 1998–2001, Grant & Fellowship, Asian Cultural Council, US
- 2003, Best Publishing Project Award, Les Rencontres d’Arles Festival, France
- 2008, Finalists, ING REAL photography award, the Netherlands
- 2009, Asia 21 Fellow, Asia Society, US

== Selected book publications ==
- Contemporary Photography in Asia

Author: Keiko Hooton, Anthony George Godfrey
Publisher: Prestel Publishing Ltd., Spring 2013, ISBN 978-3-7913-4807-0

- LIFE & DEATH - Art and The Body in Contemporary China

Author: Silvia Fok
Publisher: intellect Bristol, UK/Chicago, US, 2013, ISBN 978-1-84150-626-5

- FEAR AND ART IN THE CONTEMPORARY WORLD

Author: Caterina Albano
Publisher: REAKTION BOOKS LTD, 2012, ISBN 978-1-78023-019-1

- ARTE NOVA CHINA - Da Rebeldia À Glabalização

Author: José Drummond
Publisher: Livros do Meio, September 2011, ISBN 978-99965-851-1-1

- CONTEMPORARY CHINESE PHOTOGRAPHY

Author: Gu Zheng
China Youth Press & CYPI Press, 2011, ISBN 978-7-5153-0175-4

- MICROWORLDS

Author: Marc Valli & Margherita Dessanay
An Elephant Book & Laurence King Publishing, 2011, ISBN 978-1-85669-787-3

- The Digital Eye - Photographic Art in the Electronic Age

Author: Sylvia Wolf
Prestel Publishing Ltd., Spring 2010, ISBN 978-3-7913-4318-1

- New China New Art

Author: Richard Vine
Prestel Publishing Ltd., 2008, ISBN 978-3791339429

- AVATARS AND ANTIHEROES

Author: Claudia Albertini
Kodansha International, 2008, ISBN 978-4-7700-3071-9

- ARTWORKS-The Progressive Collection

Authors: Dan Cameron, Peter B. Lewis, Toby Devan Lewis, Mark Schwartz, foreword by Toni Morrison
Distributed Art Pub, 2007, ISBN 978-1933045726

- China Art Book

Author: Uta Grosenick & Caspar H·Schübbe
Dumont publisher, 2007, ISBN 978-3-8321-7769-0

- China Onward-The Estella Collection

Author: Frances Bowles
Louisiana Museum of Modern Art, 2007, ISBN 87-91607-38-8

== Reviews ==
2017
凤凰艺术专访 | 邢丹文：现实是残酷的，但要敢于正视 | 作者 李鹏, 2017/10/06
邢丹文：在每一幅图像里重构现实 | 2017/10/10
文章刊登于《云端》杂志2017年第10期
Xing Danwen's "Captive of Love" by Tom Mouna, Art Asia PacificWeb, 2017/10/17
Art Radar, "Captive of Love": exploring urbanity with Danwen Xing at Red Brick Art Museum, Beijing, 2017/10/17
雅昌专稿 | 邢丹文：一个藏在喧嚣背后的影像艺术家, 2017/10/18
王澈谈邢丹文：如何隐没？ 2017/10/20
流动，考察性思考和人文视角—邢丹文访谈, 《画刊》ARTMONTHLY magazine, 2017年第10期
"CHINSKA AWANGARDA PO 1989 ROKU", MAGDALENA DUBROWSKA, newspaper GAZETA WYBORCZA - WARSZAWA, 2017-10-20, str.:33
2016
William Schaefer, The Lives of Form: From Zhang Jin to Aaron Siskind, ASAP/Journal, Volume 1, Number 3, September 2016, pp. 461–486, by Johns Hopkins University Press 2014
Book The Reception of Chinese Art across Cultures, Edited by Michelle Ying-ling Huang, Chapter Twelve Reception of Xing Danwen's Lens-based Art Across Cultures by Silvia Fok, Cambridge Scholars Publishing, Dec 2014, Page 255–277, in UK 2014, ISBN 978-1-4438-5909-7
2013
Interview and Featuring Danwen Xing, contemporary photography magazine BLINK, Issue #21, LET'S FALL IN LOVE, February 2013
Jelena Stojkovic, The City Vanishes: Urban Landscape in Staged Chinese Photography, Journal HISTORY OF PHOTOGRAPHY, Volume 37, Issue 3, August 2013, UK, p360-369
Kitty Go, Focus: Artist Pension Trust, Uniting Commerce and Creativity, China Daily, 16–22 August 2013, p28-29
2012
Xing Danwen, When Art Happened, magazine LEAP, June, 2012, Beijing, p114-121 2011
Laurence King Publishing, ISBN 978-1-85669-787-3, UK, August 2011, P134-141
Shelley Rice, "Material Dreaming - Photography and Sculpture", magazine SCULPTURE, Vol.30 No.7, September 2011, New York, p48-53
俞若玫，“邢丹文：诗意摄影，折射社会发展光谱”，信报，Aug 24, 2011, 香港
陆斯嘉，三大外资行最新收藏艺术品趋势：他们最爱中国哪些艺术家，理财一周，C12-13
2010
John S Rosenberg, "Urban Utopias", Harvard Magazine, Sep/Oct, 2010, US, p32-35
Xing Danwen, "Xing Danwen", POINT -Asin Contemporary Art Magazine, Vol 1, October 2010, Korea, p24-31
Miss Papa, Life in Discovery, magazine (source name to be added), June 2010, China, p 48–51
Li Meiyan, magazine (source name to be added), Mar 2010, China, p108-109
Richard Vine, "Beijing Confidential - Xing Danwen", Art in America, Feb 2010, US, p84-93
Nico Tang, "The flâneur", City Magazine, Jan 2010, Hong Kong, p168
2009
Kevin Kwong, "Model Citizen", South China Morning Post, 8 December 2009, HongKong
Bourree Lam, "Xing Danwen Interview", Time Out Magazine, 25 November 2009, Hong Kong
Phoenix Zhang, MING magazine, Oct 2009, Hong Kong, p180-185
Yeewan Koon, "Seeing things her way", Muse Magazine, 8 December 2009, Hong Kong, p97-99
Lin Ri, Muse Art, Oct 2009, China, p66-68
Wang Xue, PIXEL, Sep 2009, No.2, China, p44-47
Madeleine Eschenbury, "Xing Danwen: Revealing the Masquerade of Modernity", YISHU, Vol 8 / Number 4, Jul/Aug 2009, Canada, p51-66
Bokyung Kim, "Xing Danwen", Monthly Photo, Aug 2009, Korea, p114-125
Luo Yi, Vogue, Aug 2009, China, p148-149
Li Jingjing, China Photo Press, 16 June 2009, China, p3
A Work of Persol, Vanity Fair, Italy, 6 May 2009, p131-132
Gu Zheng, Art China, No.5, 2009, China
Paul Flynn, "Xing Danwen", Artist Profile, issue 7, April, 2009, Australia
Liu Yue, Chinese Contemporary Art News, Apr 2009, No.51, Taiwan
Book by Zhao Ying, Shandong Fine Art Publishing House, China, p162-175
2008
Xing Danwen, "A Personal Diary", Art Asia Pacific / 15th Anniversary Special Issue, Issue 61, Nov/Dec, 2008, US, p168-177
Holland Cotter, "China's Female Artists Quietly Emerge", The New York Times, Art & Design, 30 July 2008
Gu Zheng, Artco Magazine, July 2008, TaiWan, p64-73 and cover page
Pan Guangyi, "Wall House", Artco Magazine, July 2008, TaiWan, p184-185
Cheng Guanghu, "Xing Dan Wen", Photographic Art Magazine, June 2008, Korea, p54-57
Cong Yun, World Photographic, June 2008, China
Mette Holm,"Kinesiske Kunstnere har faet selvtillid", Billedkunstnernes Forbund, NR.2, June 2008, Denmark
Jiang Yuejun, Guangzhou Daily, 29 March 2008, Saturday, China
Zhu Yinan, Tianjin Daily, 25 April - 1 January 2008, China
2007
Staff Editor, ”邢丹文：小时后‘摩天大楼’的概念是需仰视的高楼而现在我们却在沙盘上俯视自己的未来”, Chinese Commercial Photography, No.19, Jan 2007, China, p56-59
Gu Zheng, "Projecting the Reality of China through the Lens: On the Artistic Practice of Xing Danwen", Chinese Photography, April 2007, China, p64-73
book "China Post Contemporary Art" by Jiang Ming, ISBN 978-986-82691-0-1, September, 2006, China, p129-133
2006
Jean-Claude Vantroyen, "Les minidrames de Xing Danwen", Le Soir, p25 p28. Mercredi 27 December 2006, Belgium
Eleonora Battiston, "Xing Danwen", ZOOM magazine, p32-37, November/December 2006, Italy
Alain Jullien, "Les autofictions virtuelles de Xing Danwen", Le Monde 2, no 144. p50-57, Supplement, 18 November 2006, France
Gu Zheng, "Fictions smash the Illusory Reality", PhotoChina magazine, p28-33, Nov 2006, China
Xiao Bei, "Xing Danwen: presumptions on the urban fiction", Modern Weekly - Citylife, 25 November 2006, China, p32
ELLE DECO, Vol. 107, No. 10, May 2006, China, p117
Zhang Na, Beijing Youth Weekly, Vol. 573, No. 36, Sept 14–20, 2006, China, p8-13
