= Tazeen =

Tazeen is a female given name. Notable people with the name include:

- Tazeen Ahmad, reporter for American and British television news
- Tazeen Fatma (born 1949), Indian politician
- Tazeen Qayyum (born 1973), Pakistani-Canadian conceptual artist
