= Misha Japanwala =

Visual artist and fashion designer dedicated to women's rights in Pakistan

- Born: London
- Education: Parsons School of Design
- Spouse: Fisher Neal
- Website: www.mishajapanwala.com

Misha Japanwala is a visual artist and fashion designer of Pakistani origin. Japanwala created art work dedicating to women rights in Pakistan, and her art has been featured in Vogue and V Magazine. In June 2021 Japanwala designed breast plates for American rapper Lizzo's music video "Rumors".

== Personal life ==
Japanwala was born in London, but to a Bohra Muslim family from Karachi, and was brought up in Islamabad in a liberal family background. She graduated from the New York Parsons school of Design in 2018 and works in New York City. After graduation, she worked as an accessory assistant at Elle. She later joined the atelier of Proenza Schouler where she was then laid off due to COVID-19. In 2022 she wedded with actor Fisher Neal.

== Art collections ==
Misha Japanwala creates personalized sculpted breastplates and photographs these on otherwise nude female models. through fashionable wearable resin re-creations, and incidentally which does not constitute censorable nudity for social media platforms like Instagram. According to Japanwala her signature art (May 2018) collection 'Azaadi' (meaning "freedom" in Urdu) is in response to difficulties like honor killings, domestic violence and the societal pressures faced by women in Pakistan challenges the status quo by pushing the boundaries. Japanwala maintains, her goal in her art collection 'Azaadi' was to subvert the male gaze, reclaim the art related to the female body from the male perspectives and instead depict from the feminist perspective.

According to Aamina Khan, Japanwala sported long dangling earrings with the words 'Meri Marzi" meaning my choice.

Japanwala's work has been featured in a six-page editorial spread in Vogue Spain, modeled by French model Cindy Bruna. Japanwala received her second offer of displaying her art from model Gigi Hadid in special issue of V Magazine named Gigi's Journal Part II. Japanwala was selected on the "30 under 30 Asia" list published by Forbes in 2021.

== Backlash and response ==
According to Japanwala she has faced some backlash from conservative quarters of her home country Pakistan saying why does she indulge in designs do not confirm with cultural restrictions for women despite being a Muslim woman. Japanwala says in Pakistan it is difficult for women to have agency over their own bodies and this backlash confirms Pakistani conservatives feel frightened by women taking charge of their bodies.

== See also ==
- Aurat March
- Feminism in Pakistan
- Louvre
- The Compleat Sculptor
