= Jamil Naqsh =

British Pakistani painter (1939–2019)

- Born: 25 December 1939; Kairana, United Provinces, British India
- Died: 16 May 2019 (aged 79); London, England
- Education: Ustad Haji Sharif
- Known for: Painting
- Notable work: Reclining Nude, Woman with Pigeon
- Awards: Pride of Performance, Sitara-i-Imtiaz
- Website: http://www.jamil-naqsh.com/

Jamil Naqsh (Urdu: جمِیل نقش), (25 December 1939 – 16 May 2019) was a British Pakistani painter who lived a reclusive life in London from 2012 until his death. He briefly studied at National College of Arts but left before obtaining a degree. His work has been described as idealized and sensual.

== Life ==
Jamil Naqsh was born in Kairana, India in 1939, and later moved to Karachi, Pakistan during the partition. In his early teens, he had the experience of travelling alone through Chittagong, Calcutta and Colombo. He learned a lot about life during that harsh journey. He also gained a great respect for the art traditions of the past while travelling. This journey's impressions later influenced his thinking and work.

Naqsh trained as a miniaturist under National College of Arts (NCA) professor Ustad Haji Muhammad Sharif in Lahore beginning in 1953. He left the NCA without completing his degree as he felt it was the experience not the qualification that was important. He left Pakistan in 2012 and settled in London, United Kingdom.

On 7 May 2019, due to pneumonia, Naqsh was admitted to St Mary’s Hospital in London, where he died nine days later at the age of 79.

== Work ==
Naqsh mostly painted pigeons. He also painted women, often integrating them with the elements of horses, pigeons or children. He grew up seeing pigeons flutter around in his courtyard; thus, much of his work included drawings of pigeons. He set up his Karachi studio in a rooftop garden where pigeons were allowed to move around freely and were welcomed as visitors.

Naqsh was influenced by the works of Indian, Pakistani and European masters, including Pablo Picasso and Jean-Auguste-Dominique Ingres. In June 2012, an untitled piece by Naqsh was sold for about PKR 6.3 million at Bonhams.

=== Art exhibits ===
Some of his exhibits are listed below:

- Solo exhibit at Lahore Arts Council and Karachi Arts Council (1962)
- 150 paintings and drawings of female forms with horses were exhibited (1998)
- Jamil Naqsh: A Retrospective, Mohatta Palace, Karachi, Pakistan (2003)
- Solo exhibit at Studio Glass Art Gallery, London (2005)
- Solo exhibit at Albemarle Gallery in Mayfair, London (2011)
- Art exhibit in Lahore included 23 canvases and 16 graphite drawings (2012)
- "Mohenjo Daro" Albemarle Gallery, London (2018)
- Fisher Woman of My Mohenjo-daro at Jamil Naqsh Museum in Karachi, Pakistan (2018)

Naqsh also painted Islamic calligraphy in his modern style with unique and bold brush strokes. His calligraphic style maintained the basic elements of art, with special emphasis on 'line'. Since 1996, the Jamil Naqsh Foundation and Museum have been run by his family members in Karachi, Pakistan. In December 2017, the Jamil Naqsh Museum was inaugurated by Aitzaz Ahsan in Defence Housing Authority, Karachi.

== Awards and recognition ==
- Sitara-i-Imtiaz (Star of Excellence) Award in 2009, from President Asif Ali Zardari
- Pride of Performance Award in 1989, from President Ghulam Ishaq Khan
