= Hasnat Mehmood =

Pakistani visual artist

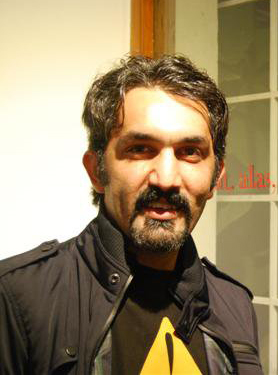
- Born: 3 March 1978 (age 48); Jhelum, Pakistan
- Occupation: Artist
- Spouse: Atteqa Ali
- Children: 1

Hasnat Mehmood (Urdu: حسنات محمود) is a Pakistani visual artist who lives and works in New Jersey. He was born on 3 March 1978 in Jhelum.

== Art career ==
Hasnat Mehmood was trained as a traditional miniature painter at the National College of Arts, but in his search for a new language in this medium he transformed the traditional practice into contemporary dialogue. He is recognised as a progressive, radical artist. Hasnat Mehmood creates contemporary art employing a technique that is considered to be a traditional practice. The painting of miniature works of art is considered to be the cultural heritage of Pakistan; as such, it should remain recognizable as it was practiced in the past. For "purists," the experiments that Hasnat and others take in their approaches to painting minute works of art render the work to be anything but a miniature painting.

Quddus Mirza wrote of his work: "Mehmood has ventured into another realm and can be labelled as a conceptual miniaturist."

Of Holy land and I Love Miniature, Yeewan Koon said: "Hasnat Mehmood is perhaps the best known of the three artists and his works have been shown in galleries across the globe. The two main works in the show are formed by painstakingly painted circles that collectively read in Braille sequence, "Holy Land" and " I Love Miniature". We are reminded of the paradoxical concept that Orhan Pamuk introduced about reaching the height of aesthetic achievement through blindness. But it is the viewer who is rendered blind, at least metaphorically... "

On his recent work “The Inquiry of Art” the artist stated: "The body of work produced for this show is an investigation of the very basics of Pakistani art in the present times... I think that art has never been an individual’s effort only; it has always been produced according to the times in which the artist lives." These portraits articulate this phenomenon because viewers will find a cross-listing of writers, etc. from one portrait to the next, indicating a specificity of time and place.

Hasnat has been exploring conceptual art within the aesthetics of miniature painting. The subtlety in constructing portraits of personalities close to him (starting with his wife and colleagues, as well as of his friends and other fellow artists) is a sign of his conceptual twist—rather than just a transformation from being a miniature artist—and a venture into something exciting and exquisite.

== Solo exhibitions ==
- 2011: The Inquiry of Art.
- 2008: Chawkandi Gallery, Karachi
- 2009: Aicon Gallery, New York
- 2010: Saloon, Lahore

== Selected group exhibitions ==
=== 2010 ===
- The Havelian Express, group show at CAIS gallery, Hong Kong.

=== 2007 ===
Aicon Gallery, London

=== 2006 ===
- Between Two Worlds; Group show at Crow-eaters Gallery, Lahore
- Contemporary Art from Pakistan, Group show at Asia House and Manchester Art Gallery, UK
- Group show at HNTB Architecture, Washington D.C.
- Lila/Play: Contemporary Miniatures & New Art from South Asia, Australia
- Landscape: Places real and imagined, Group show at Alhamra Gallery, Lahore

=== 2005 ===
- The Artist's Face, Self-Portraits of our Times, Gallery Rohtas 2, Lahore
- Contemporary Miniatures, Crow-eaters Gallery, Lahore
- Karkhana Contemporary Collaboration, Aldrich Museum of Contemporary Art, CT, USA (Exhibition would be traveling to Asian Art Museum)
- Voices, World Bank Office, Islamabad

=== 2004 ===
- Contemporary Miniatures from Pakistan, Fukuoka Asian Art Museum, Japan
- Playing with a Loaded Gun, Kunsthalle Fridericianum, Kassel

=== 2003 ===
- Karkhana, Touchstones Art Gallery, Rochdale, UK
- Contemporary Miniatures from Pakistan, K3 – Project Space, Zurich
- Playing with a Loaded Gun, Apexart, New York (catalogue)
- Miniatures Pakistanaises, Masion d'Art Contemporain Chaillioux, Fresnes, France (Catalogue)
- New Voices, Canvas Gallery, Karachi
- Around Miniature, Chawkandi Art, Karachi

=== 2002 ===
- Paintings from Pakistan, Niavaran Gallery, Tehran

== Collections ==
- British Museum, London UK (Acquired for contemporary landscape section)
- Salima Hashmi, Dean of BNU, School of Visual Arts, Lahore
