= Haji Muhammad Sharif =

Pakistani miniature painter

Haji Muhammad Sharif (1889 – 9 December 1978) was a Pakistani miniature painter and teacher. Trained in the traditional apprenticeship system, he was among the last generation of hereditary ustads and played a significant role in the transmission of miniature painting traditions in South Asia. He taught at the Mayo School of Art in Lahore (later the National College of Arts) and influenced several prominent artists, including Bashir Ahmed (miniaturist) and Jamil Naqsh. He was honored with the Pride of Performance award by the Government of Pakistan in 1967, and was commemorated on a Pakistani postage stamp in 1991.

== Career ==
Descended from a line of hereditary painters associated with the Patiala court, Sharif taught miniature painting at the Mayo School of Art (later the National College of Arts) in Lahore from 1945 until his retirement in 1968.

On the occasion of his first solo exhibition, organized by the Pakistan Arts Council at Alhamra in 1960, the Mayo School of Arts' then principal Sidney Spedding wrote in the exhibition pamphlet that "It is my considered opinion that there is no finer artist in the world in his sphere of Mughal Miniature painting."

== Style and influences ==
Art historian Marcella Sirhandi describes Sharif's style as a mix of diverse styles and subjects reflecting the different schools of miniature painting that his teachers belonged to (including Lala Shaoo Ram, one of his father's students, and Muhammad Hussain Khan of the Delhi School of miniature painting), as well as the sensibilities of the Sikh court to which he was attached.

The artist Nusra Latif Qureshi also notes compositional similarities between Haji Muhammad Sharif's paintings and the eighteenth-century Company School of miniature painting.

== Legacy ==
Sharif's career as a painter and teacher placed him at the center of the transmission of miniature painting traditions in the twentieth century.

Marcella Sirhandi identifies Haji Muhammad Sharif, along with Sheikh Shujaullah, as among the last traditional ustads of miniature painting, whose hereditary training conferred legitimacy on their student and successor, Bashir Ahmed (miniaturist).

According to art historian Nadeem Omar Tarar, contemporary Pakistani miniaturists—including Bashir Ahmed (miniaturist), Shahzia Sikander, and Imran Qureshi—"are context-bound to trace their lineage" to Sharif. Tarar also recounts that Jamil Naqsh dropped out of his program at the Mayo School of Arts to pursue individual study with Sharif, and paid homage to his teacher by signing some of his early works Shagird Ustad Sharif ("Apprentice of Professor Sharif").

In an interview with Frieze magazine, Imran Qureshi identified Sharif as an early inspiration during his training in miniature painting, stating that Sharif "personalized the traditional vocabulary, which strengthened his work."

Haji Muhammad Sharif was honoured with the Government of Pakistan's Pride of Performance Award in 1967 for his services to miniature painting. In 1991, Pakistan Post issued a commemorative postage stamp featuring Sharif as part of a series celebrating notable Pakistani painters.

Today, the National College of Arts awards an annual "Haji Sharif Prize" to graduating students excelling in miniature painting.

== Collections ==
Sharif's paintings are held in the collections of the National Art Gallery, Pakistan and the National College of Arts in Lahore. One of his paintings is also in the collection of the Jordan National Gallery of Fine Arts.
