= Quddus Mirza =

Pakistani artist

- Born: 1961 (age 64–65)
- Education: National College of Arts, Royal College of Art
- Known for: Art critic, painting

Quddus Mirza is a Pakistani art critic, artist, and art educator based in Lahore. As an art critic, his writings have been published in national and international newspapers and magazines.

== Early life and career ==
Quddus Mirza was born in 1961. He graduated from National College of Arts, Lahore in 1986 and completed his post-graduate work at the Royal College of Arts London in 1991. He is known for his writings on Pakistani art and has developed an eye for art over the years. When asked to critique another artist's paintings or work on display at a gallery, he's very meticulous and spends at least ten minutes on each painting absorbing all the nuances. Later when he interviews the displaying artist, he is very tactful and respectful of the artist's sensibilities. He himself has a warm and relaxed attitude towards the artist and encourages him to open up and talk about his work.

Quddus Mirza is a professor and the head of Fine Arts Department, National College of Arts, Lahore, Pakistan in 2019.

== Art style ==
Mirza’s own work deals with the issues of pictorial investigation. His paintings address the multiplicity of meaning by fusing the five senses of a viewer. He deliberately uses bright colors and paints with gestural and inlaid social and political intent. Mirza uses division of space and overlapping of brush strokes for effect. He paints basically images and ideas that deal with the political and social scene. Quddus Mirza describes what art is in an interview, "The process of creativity is not targeted at an audience. It's about self-expression. Van Goh's work may be appreciated today but what would he care? Creativity is very self-oriented process. It's a way of exploring yourself".

== Writings ==
Trained as a visual artist, Mirza has been writing on Pakistani art for over a decade now in many major newspapers and art magazines of Pakistan.

In his writings, Mirza analyzes the parallel between east and west. He has rejected the term Pakistani art. He said there is nothing that can be called Pakistani art; he says that more properly, such work should be called "art from Pakistan". His writings address the issues revolving around art and life. Being an art educator, Mirza also questions problems in art education, as well as the role of art galleries and institutions shaping and reshaping Pakistani art. In his writings, he examines the conventional trends of art in Pakistan, especially those initiated by modern miniaturists who transformed it for foreign curators due to the tastes of the art market in the West.

== Exhibits ==
- Canvas Gallery, Karachi, Pakistan in 2019
