= Bashir Ahmed (miniaturist) =

Pakistani miniature painter (born 1954)

Ustad Bashir Ahmed
- Born: 1954 (age 71–72); Lahore, Pakistan

Ustad Bashir Ahmed is a Pakistani artist, also known as a Mughal miniature painter. He created the degree program in miniature painting at the National College of Arts in Lahore, Pakistan, in 1983. His students have included notable miniaturists including Shahzia Sikander and Saira Wasim, as well as Imran Qureshi.

== Early life ==
Bashir Ahmed was born in Lahore, Pakistan in 1954. His father's name was Barkat Ali Malik.

== Education ==
Bashir Ahmed started his professional training in 1973 at the National College of Arts in Lahore, Pakistan. Over eight years, he pursued a traditional Ustad–Shagird apprenticeship with two hereditary masters of miniature painting, Ustad Haji Muhammad Sharif and Ustad Sheikh Shujaullah, who came from families of court painters in Patiala and Alwar, respectively. Art historian Marcella Sirhandi considers Ahmed "the last South Asian artist to have had traditional training in this age-old apprenticeship system from painters who had come from the royal court system."

Bashir Ahmed started his teaching career at the National College of Arts as a lecturer in 1976. He received his Master of Fine Arts degree from the University of Punjab, Lahore Pakistan in 1985. He finished his master's degree in Public Administration there as well, in 2004.

== Experience and achievements ==
- 1973 Designed Stage setting five backdrops size 15 feats wide and 100 feats long at Lahore Fort for Islamic Summit Conference at Lahore Fort Pakistan.
- 1976–90 Patron of Rowing Club took the Expedition to Travel from River Ravi to head Bloke on country Boats and conduct rowing competitions of Rowing Club National College of Arts, Lahore
- 1975–76 Program Tehrik-e-Pakistans in collaboration with Pakistan Television PTV, Lahore Pakistan the producer was Shahid Mahmood Nadeem
- 1976 Selected by the Board of Governors of National College of Arts, and appoint as a lecturer of Fine Arts, Miniature Painting, and Drawing
- 1983 Special authentication adviser to the Director Central Museum of Lahore, Pakistan
- 1982 Founder of Degree Program of Miniature Painting of the bachelor's degree course that is first degree curriculum in the history of Miniature Painting in The world, and approved by the college academic Board of Studies, and Classes started in 1982. This is the first Syllabus ever in the Studio Arts Degree Program in the world.
- 1988 Promoted as assistant professor of Fine Arts on seniority basis, National College of Arts, Lahore Pakistan
- 1992 Lecture on the display of Mughal Miniature Painting at National Museum, talk about Muslim architecture in New Delhi, Agra, Jaipur, India. Took twenty seven Students on Study tour to Agra, Jaipur and New Delhi, India.
- 1992 Lecture on Technique of Miniature Painting of Mughal Art and Art appreciation at the British Council, Lahore Pakistan
- 1993 Lecture on Journey of Muslim Miniature Painting into Subcontinent, at Hunrkada Art School Islamabad, Pakistan.
- 1994 Delivered lectures on History and Teaching of Miniature Painting, Kansas City Art Institute Kansas, Measure, and also gave a talk about my paintings & drawings, at Oklahoma Still Water Oklahoma
- 1994 Delivered lectures on History and Teaching of Miniature Painting Howard University, Boston, Massachusetts, on invitation of Asia society,
- 1994 Delivered lectures on History and Teaching of Miniature Painting, and discus the Western Art Composition, with Mughal Indian Miniature painting of Muslim era comparison, and contemporary miniature painting art form, in the Department of University Maryland,
- 1995 Workshop for one week teach the technique of Miniature Painting and Wasli & Brush making technique at Hall Marks Card Company Complex, Art Department for ten senior artists, Kansas City Missouri
- 1995 Workshop Taught Technique of Miniature Painting, coerce for four month three days in a week complete, gad rang painting, Sayah qualm painting at Arvin University, Orange Country, LA, USA.
- 1995 Workshop of technique of Miniature Painting, Brush Making, Paper Making, for four month three day in a week, complete gad rang miniature painting Sayah qualm painting, techniques at Pacific Asia Museum Pasadena, L.A USA.
- 1997 Lecture demonstration on techniques and history of Muslim Miniature Painting Mughal India at Arkansas, Conway University Little Rock, Arkansas, U.S.A
- 1997 Taught Techniques of Miniature Painting gad rang and sayah qualm, one complete color painting and Sayah qualm technique completed by the students at Oklahoma still water University Art Department Undergraduate Program me, Oklahoma –USA.
- 1998 Workshop Taught Techniques of miniature Painting and basics calligraphy at Pacific Asia Museum, Pasadena L.A.U.S.A
- 2002 Selected as Associate Professor of Fine Arts (selected by the board of governors at the National College of Arts, Lahore).
- 2003 Convener Committee of unified Syllabus of Fine Arts for Institutes’ and university's of Pakistan,
- 2005–2014 Head of Department of Fine Arts-NCA
- 2006 Officiating Principal-National College of Arts, Lahore.
- 2011 Principal- National College of Arts, Lahore

== Exhibitions curated ==
- 1994–2006 Curated, Exhibitions, Students work at Hunarkada Islamabad, Kung Art Galleries Karachi, and Ejaz art Galleries Lahore & Ocean art Galleries Lahore, Karachi.
- 2000 Curated an exhibition of Miniature Painting of Seven students at Pacific Asia Museum Pasadena L.A., USA for the promotion of miniature Painting form Pakistan and National College of Arts, Lahore.
- 2001 Curated a National exhibition of Miniatures In Islamabad & Karachi for National Council in Muhatta Palace Karachi.
- 2002 Curated an exhibition of Miniature Painting in IKM International Cultural Museum in Oslo (Norway).
- 2003 Convener of Committee of Syllabus of Fine Arts for the Higher Education Commission, Islamabad Pakistan.
- 2003 Curated an exhibition of Photography (seeing before the wards) by the Raza Kazim at Zahur ul Akhlaque Gallery, NCA, Lahore.
- 2003 Curated an exhibition of Miniature Painting at Kunj Art Gallery, Karachi (Student work).
- 2004 Curated an exhibition of Miniature Painting at Kunj Art Gallery, Karachi (section, 2003–2004)
- 2004 Curated an exhibition on the SAARC summit Conference Islamabad, Hunarkada Art School Islamabad, Pakistan,
- 2005 Curated Ustad Shah gird inaugurated by M.F. Husain at the National College of Arts.
- Curated Miniature Painting at French Embassy Islamabad.
- 2006 Curated an exhibition at Kampo Museum Minamigosho- cho Okazaki Sakyo-ku Kyoto, Japan,
- 2008 Ocean Art Gallery Karachi, Artists of Karachi and Lahore exhibited their work.
- 2009 Ocean Art Gallery Lahore Group Exhibition of five Karachi artists from Karachi, exhibited their work.
- 2010 Curated an exhibition of Amjad Butt Silver foils Paintings of calligraphic images’ at Karachi and Design the catalog. Curated a Group Exhibition at Ocean Art Gallery Lahore

Restoration

- 1981- Ongoing Restoration of Miniature Paintings, oil paintings, water color, wood doors and other items for Private collections

=== Solo exhibitions ===
- Exhibition of Miniature Painting at Holiday Inn, Islamabad Miniature Paintings, graphite Drawings
- 1980 Exhibition of Miniature Painting National College Of Arts Lahore Pakistan,
- 1988 Howard University Art Department Washington, D.C. USA Display of Miniature Painting

Solo Exhibition on fifty years of Pakistan to Introduce the Pakistani Arts outside the country, Pacific Asia Museum Pasadena, L.A.USA Solo Show at the Oklahoma State University Still water O.K. USA, Painting, Miniature Paintings, Drawing and experiments work,

- 1997 Solo Exhibition at Southern Pablo University Colorado, USA Miniature Paintings, and Drawings,
- 1998 Solo Exhibition at Lahore Gallery Miniature paintings, acrylic on canvas, Mix media paintings, at Lahore Pakistan.
- 2004 Zahoor ul Akhlaq Art Gallery National College of Arts, inaugurated by M.F. Hussein
- 2005 Exhibition of Painting and Drawings at Ejaz, Gallery, Lahore
- 2007 An Exhibition at Karachi (opening of Marcie Comical LTD)
- Third Exhibit was in Karachi on 21 August 2008, Ocean Art Gallery Karachi, Acrylic Paintings, Mix media, and Drawings,* Forth Exhibition was 28 August 2008, at Hunarkada Visual Art Institute
- 2008 Four solo Exhibitions in one month starting from 7 August 2008, first exhibit at NCA, Lahore, Second Exhibit was at Ocean Art Gallery on 14 August 2008 of Graphite Drawings.
- 2009 An Exhibition of Miniature paintings, drawings, Paintings at Ocean Art Galleries on 14 August on Independence Day.
- 2011 Solo Exhibition of sculptures, paintings and ceramic art at Arts Council of Pakistan Karachi

=== Auction exhibitions ===
- 1993 Display of Miniature Painting Exhibition Hunarkada Art School, Islamabad, Pakistan, Donated to the Shaukat Khanum Cancer Hospital
- 2006 Auction for the Earthquake and Sajanagar School System at Lords, London, U.K. For Fund Raising Auction.
- 2008 Auction Exhibition Convention Centre Islamabad, For Earthquake Victims

=== Group exhibitions ===
- 1976 Faculty Exhibition, National College of Arts, Lahore. Punjab Art Council Annual Exhibition, Lahore-Pakistan
- 1977 Group Exhibition of contemporary artists of Pakistan at Art Centre Gulberg Lahore
- 1978 Punjab artist Association, Annual Exhibition of young artists Lahore
- 1982 Exhibition of Pakistan National Cancel of Arts Islamabad
- 1984 National Exhibition, Islamabad. Miniature Painting
- 1985 Punjab Art Council Annual Exhibition, Lahore.
- 1986 Exhibition of S.S.Hayder award, Peshawar, Pakistan
- 1987 Exhibition of SAARC Countries under PNCA, Lahore.
- 1989 Punjab Art Council Annual Exhibition, Lahore.
- 1992 Faculty Exhibition, National College of Arts, Lahore
- 1994 Contemporary Paintings of Pakistan at Pacific Asia Museum Pasadena, L.A. USA
- 1995 Under Common Wealth Exhibition of Painting (Associates with) USA at Boston, USA
- 1999 Group Exhibition Ejaz Gallery, Lahore.
- 2000 Miniature Painting Group Exhibition Ejaz Gallery, Lahore.
- Participated in the Group Exhibition of Painting at Karachi Sheraton (Punjab Arts Council Lahore).
- 2002 Participated in the Group Exhibition, Iran, Abu Dubai, Sent by Pakistan National Council of Art, Islamabad.
- 2003 Participated in the Group Exhibition, Royal Gallery, DHA, Lahore.
- 2003 Scope Exhibitions of 9th Convocation NCA at Zahoor ul Akhlaq Gallery inaugurated by General Pervez Musharraf, President of Pakistan.
- 2004 Group Exhibition at Ejaz Gallery, Lahore.

== Major projects ==
- 1976–present Took students on study tour in different locations in Pakistan.
- Visit to Yale University New Haven Green, British Museum and Yale Museum Connecticut Washington D.C. Visit the Smithsonian Institution and the other Galleries Maryland School of Art and Scenarios, Part, Columbia University, New York University.
- Study tour of 27 students to India, Delhi, Agra, and Jaipur to meet the Miniature Painters and Museums and Historical Places (India)
- 1995 Boston Museum, Mass Art Institute, Howard University and Individual Art Studios Boston US. Road Ireland school of Design and Brow University, Providence US.
- Float Design for the Punjab Govt. Lahore.
- 1990–1996 External Examiner of BFA, Sialkot, Sargodha
- 1990–1995 Patron and established the Puppeteer Association at National College of Arts, Lahore.
- 1993 Design tree Plantation Festival in collaboration with Deputy Commissioner, Lahore-Pakistan.
- Muscatine Museum of Art, Muscatine Iowa, USA.
- 1994 Presented a Portrait of Maharaj Ghulam Hassan Kathak to the Pacific Asia Museum (Permanent Collection), Pasadena.
- Appraisal of Miniature Painting Archives at Nelson Museum, Kansas City, M.O. USA
- 1995 "The Mughal" Stage Drama, Direction, Stage designing and costume, for Pakistan Arts Council Pasadena, L.A, USA at Pacific Asia Museum.
- 1996 Mold of Portrait of Quid-e-Azam (Loss Wax method) Hallow Cast, (Governor House Karachi).
- 1997 Portrait of PROF. MR. SPONENBURGH M.A., M.F.A the first Principal of NCA on the 6th Convocation Lahore-Pakistan.
- 1997 Restoration and repair of the hundred and six year old wooden door (floral Patterns and paper mashie, with hand ground oil paints) in the Principal's office (collection of the NCA).
- 1998–99 Examiner M.A Final Examination, Muslim Architecture, Painting & Exhibition work Punjab University.
- 1999 Appointed for analysis of Miniature paintings and the Pakistan Galleries in the collection of the Central Museum, Lahore Pakistan by the Board of Lahore Museum for verification.
- 2000 Painted the Portrait of General Pervez Musharraf, President of Pakistan, Present on the 8th Convocation of NCA
- Painted a Mughal painting Mural for the New Lahore Airport (Allama Iqbal Airport) commissioned by Civil Aviation Authority (Size 71/2x27’)
- Painted a ceiling (Tile Design, Jali Work) for World Exxpo-2005, Aichi-Japan (Sealing Size 64’x64’)
- Upraising of Miniature Paintings of private collection of Mr.Massod from orlen City Washington State U.S.A.

== Art work at permanent collection of museums ==
- Kampo Museum Okazaki Sakyo-ku Kyoto Japan
- Portrait painting of Mahraj Kathak on oval of Ivory presented to the Museum in the permanent collection of Pacific Asia Museum Pasadena, L.A, and C.A, USA
- Pacific Asia Museum, Pasadena, C.A. (USA) Nelson museum, Kansas City, M.O. (USA),
- Art work at Nelson museum, Kansas City, M.O. (USA)

== Awards ==
- 14th Annual Exhibition-Lifetime Achievement Award on traditional Muslim Art from Artists, Association of Punjab.
- The Associate ship of the National College of Arts Awarded by the Prime Minister of Pakistan.
- First Award on drawing exhibition of South Asia Regional Council at Lahore Pakistan, arranged by PNCA in Lahore Pakistan.
- First Award, oil and Canvas, Artist Equity exhibition on Tarbela Water Power, Lahore Pakistan.
- Chughtai Award, on over all contribution of traditional and Muslim Miniature Painting in Pakistan.

== Sources ==
- http://thesaproject.wordpress.com/2011/05/22/artist-the-raving-lunatic/
- https://web.archive.org/web/20140812033049/http://www.saudiaramcoworld.com/issue/200904/reinventing.the.miniature.painting.htm
- http://www.marcellasirhandi.com/gallery.html
- https://web.archive.org/web/20140717042438/http://weeklypulse.org/details.aspx?contentID=1237&storylist=3
- https://web.archive.org/web/20141228224920/http://www.nca.edu.pk/Post-Dept-Visul-Arts.html
- http://unicorngalleryblog.com/2014/07/25/bashir-ahmed/
- https://web.archive.org/web/20170428195058/http://www.pakistanartreview.net/24th_Issue/24th_Page_7.html
- http://www.marcellasirhandi.com/ContemporaryMiniature.html
- https://tribune.com.pk/story/687151/painting-exhibition-miniature-artists-recall-technique-of-a-bygone-era/
- https://tribune.com.pk/story/726965/workshop-making-miniature-painting-techniques-easy/
- https://www.npr.org/2015/10/02/445291163/breaking-the-mold-artists-modern-miniatures-remix-islamic-art
