= Ahmad Zoay =

- Born: 1947; Ludhiana, British India
- Died: 10 July 2014 (aged 66–67); Lahore, Pakistan
- Known for: Painting, sculpting

Ahmad Zoay (1947 – 10 July 2014) was a Pakistani painter and sculptor.

== Early life ==
He was born in Ludhiana, Punjab, in pre-partition India in 1947. His family migrated to Walton, Lahore in the newly created Pakistan after partition. His father Ghulam Mohyuddin belonged to the Royal Indian Army Medical Corps and the family moved frequently according to his postings in the country. Zoay took admission in the National College of Arts, Lahore in 1969 but did not complete his degree. From there began his journey into the world of art. He travelled to many countries after that and was introduced to the then prevalent ‘Hippie culture’ that reflected in his works and life that he lived.

== Works ==
Known for paintings with psychedelic intensity his canvasses are replete with primary colours, red, yellow, green and blue. Zoay’s artistic rejection of man-made political boundaries showed in the symbolism in his paintings of a multi-cultural, multi-religious Indian sub-continent of past times.

== Death ==
Zoay died on 10 July 2014 at his home in Lahore.
