= Ailene Fields =

American sculptor and stone carving teacher

- Born: 1948 (age 77–78); Brooklyn, New York, U.S.
- Education: Lehman College
- Known for: Sculpture art
- Website: http://www.ailenefields.com

Ailene Fields (born 1948) is an American sculptor and stone carving teacher known for her skills in stone, bronze and acrylic. Her subjects often call upon mythology and fairy tales for inspiration.

== Biography ==
Born Eileen Rubin in 1948 in Brooklyn, New York, she graduated with a degree in English and Greek mythology from Lehman College, New York City, in 1973. A self-taught potter, she next studied the human figure with Bruno Lucchesi at The New School for Social Research, New York City, in 1980. Lucchesi sent her to Sculpture Center, New York City to further her practical education as a sculptor. After mastering the figure she became adept at both stone carving and sculpting for bronze casting. In 1967 she married Dr. David Fields with whom she has two sons, Marc and Adam.

Fields' first one-person exhibition was in 1987 at the Lavaggi Gallery in New York City. Since that time, her work has been continually exhibited in American art galleries. She has had solo museum exhibitions at the Bergen Museum of Art & Science, Paramus, New Jersey, and The Appleton Museum of Art, Ocala, Florida. Solo gallery exhibitions include CFM Gallery, NYC, NY; Roslyn Sailor Fine Arts, Margate, NJ; Broadhurst Gallery, Pinehurst, NC; Southern Vermont Art Center, Manchester, VT; Pendragon Gallery, Annapolis, MD; White Lights Gallery, Nyack, NY; Barbara Debetz Gallery, NYC, NY; Lavaggi Gallery, NYC, NY; and Six Summit Gallery in Ivoryton, CT. She has also been represented in well over 25 group exhibitions across the United States. She has taught stone carving at Sculpture Center and The Educational Alliance in NYC and is currently teaching at The Compleat Sculptor in New York City, one of the largest sculpture suppliers in the world, which she co-owns with Marc Fields. She is represented by CFM Gallery and Six Summit Gallery.

Ailene founded the Skylands Museum of Art in Lafayette, NJ, saying "I don't want it to be a museum where everything is sterile." The museum opened to the public on October 21, 2023.

== Sculptures ==
Fields' sculptures often feature animals, mythological figures and architectural elements. Often mixing stone with bronze, her sculptures highlight the essence of the subjects, most often in an optimistic and insightful manner. Her stone series Sacred Spaces represents places of contemplation and peace, which she feels are mandatory for our times. Themes in her work are evocative of dreams, and magic calling forth the qualities that make us human.

== Public art installations ==
=== Fantastic Creatures 2020 ===
Starting in late 2019 and running through summer 2020, in conjunction with Six Summit Gallery and featuring pieces by sculptor Gina Miccinilli, Fields exhibited three public art installations of fantastical representational works at Bella Abzug Park at Hudson Yards, Port Authority Bus Terminal, and Dag Hammarskjold Plaza.
