= Yoshitomo Nara =

Japanese artist (born 5 December 1959)

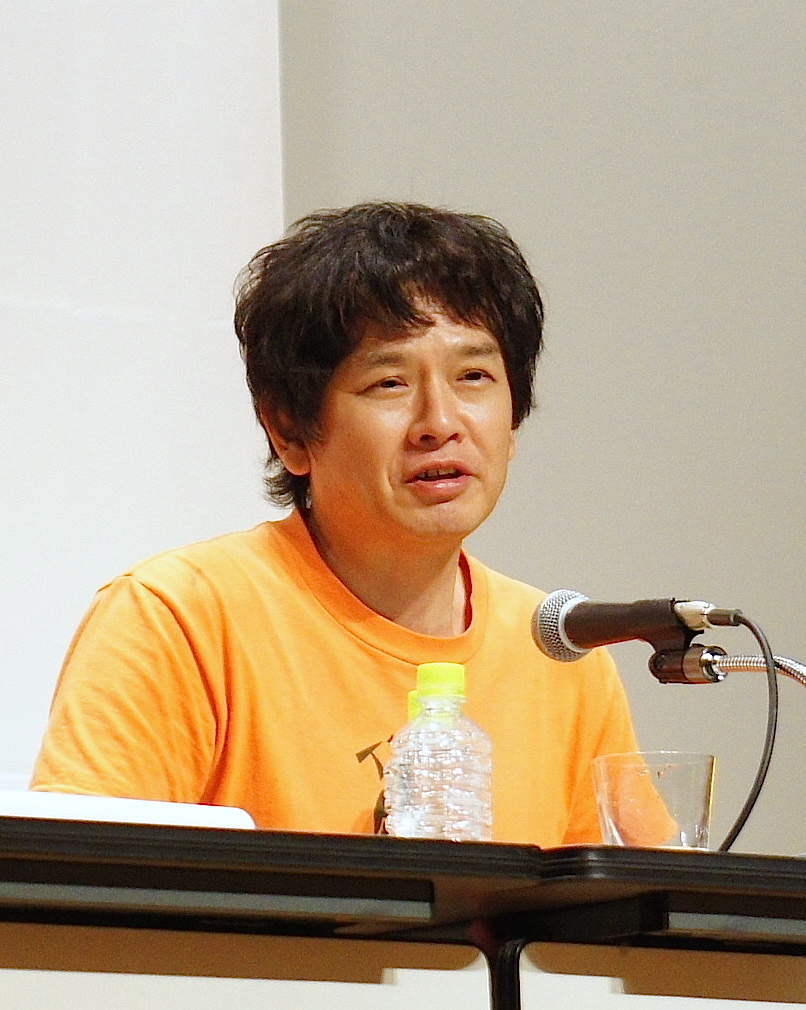
- Nara at the Yokohama Art Museum, 2012
- Born: 5 December 1959 (age 66); Hirosaki, Aomori Prefecture, Japan
- Education: Kunstakademie Düsseldorf, Germany; Aichi Prefectural University of Fine Arts and Music, Nagakute Aichi, Japan
- Known for: sculpture, painting
- Notable work: Knife Behind Back (2000), Sorry, couldn't draw left eye! (2003), Straight Jacket (2000), Sprout the Ambassador (2001)
- Awards: Award for Artist, Nagoya, Japan, 1995

Yoshitomo Nara (奈良 美智, Nara Yoshitomo; born 5 December 1959 in Hirosaki, Aomori Prefecture, Japan) is a Japanese artist. He lives and works in Nasushiobara, Tochigi Prefecture, though his artwork has been exhibited worldwide. Nara has had nearly 40 solo exhibitions since 1984. His art work has been housed at the MoMA and the Los Angeles County Museum of Art (LACMA). His most well-known and repeated subjects are "big-headed girls" with piercing eyes, who one Nara scholar describes as having "childlike expressions [that] resonate with adult emotions, [their] embodiment of kawaii (cuteness) carries a dark humor, and any explicit cultural references are intertwined with personal memories."

== Early life and education ==
Nara grew up in Aomori Prefecture, Japan, about 300 miles north of where he lives now in Tochigi Prefecture. His exposure to Western music on the American military radio station Far East Network in Honshu influenced his artistic imagination at an early age. He would later provide cover art for bands including Shonen Knife, R.E.M., and Bloodthirsty Butchers. He received his B.F.A. (1985) and an M.F.A. (1987) from the Aichi Prefectural University of Fine Arts and Music. Between 1988 and 1993, Nara studied at the Kunstakademie Düsseldorf, in Germany.

== Artwork ==
Nara first came to the fore of the art world during Japan's Pop art movement in the 1990s. The subject matter of his sculptures and paintings is deceptively simple: most works depict one seemingly innocuous subject (often pastel-hued children and animals drawn with confident, cartoonish lines) with little or no background. "But these children, who appear at first to be cute and even vulnerable, sometimes brandish weapons like knives and saws. Their wide eyes often hold accusatory looks that could be sleepy-eyed irritation at being awoken from a nap—or that could be undiluted expressions of hate."

Nara, however, does not see his weapon-wielding subjects as aggressors. "Look at them, they [the weapons] are so small, like toys. Do you think they could fight with those?" he says. "I don't think so. Rather, I kind of see the children among other, bigger, bad people all around them, who are holding bigger knives..." Lauded by art critics, Nara's bizarrely intriguing works have gained him a cult following around the world. Large original paintings regularly sell for millions of dollars.

In June, 2005, Nara's artwork was featured in the album titled "Suspended Animation" by experimental band Fantômas. Other commercial products (including videos, books, magazines, catalogues and monographs) have been dedicated to Nara's work. Recently, a two-volume catalogue raisonné of all his sculptures, paintings, and drawings was completed.

In 2010, the Asia Society showed Yoshitomo Nara: Nobody's Fool the first major New York exhibition of his work. Other major retrospectives include: "I Don't Mind If You Forget Me", which toured Japan between 2001 and 2002; and "Yoshitomo Nara: Nothing Ever Happens," which traveled the United States from 2003 to 2005. One of his exhibited works is now part of a window of the Baltic Centre for Contemporary Art in Gateshead, England.

In 2019, Nara's installation art Not Everything but/ Green House (2009) was sold for a new record price of HK$40.12m (US$5.12m) at Poly Auction Hong Kong. However, this record only lasted for a few hours. Knife Behind Back (2000), a large-scale painting by Nara, just sold at Sotheby's Contemporary Art Evening Sale in Hong Kong for HK$195.7m (US$25m), nearly five times its record. The new record is also a milestone for Nara as he becomes the most expensive Japanese artist. Can’t Wait ‘til the Night Comes was sold for HK$92.9m at the same year.

In April 2021, the painting Frog Girl was sold in Sotheby's Hong Kong Spring auction for US$12.5 million.

== Influences ==
Though Nara claims to have never said that he was influenced by manga, the imagery of manga and anime of his 1960s childhood is often cited when discussing Nara's stylized, large-eyed figures. Nara subverts these images, however, by infusing his works with horror-like imagery. This juxtaposition of human evil with the innocent child may be a reaction to Japan's rigid social conventions.

Nara cites his musical education as a foundational influence for his art. The punk rock music of Nara's youth has also influenced his work. Music from the Ramones, Dan Penn, Flogging Molly, Ralph McTell, Green Day, and the Stooges, are referenced in his artworks. Nara’s exhibitions play punk, rock, and folk soundtracks to accompany his art. In an interview with LACMA, he mentions record covers as an early source for visual art inspiration. In an interview with Esquire, he states that “There was music before art,” and ”what surprised me when I first studied art was that all my favorite sleeves were made by famous artists, photographers and designers.” He bought his first album, Suzie Q at eight years old.

Nara's upbringing in post-World War II Japan profoundly affected his mindset and, subsequently, his artwork as well. He grew up in a time when Japan was experiencing an inundation of Western pop culture; comic books, Warner Bros and Walt Disney animation, and Western rock music are just a few examples. Additionally, Nara was raised in the isolated countryside as a latchkey child of working-class parents, so he was often left alone with little to do but explore his young imagination. The fiercely independent subjects that populate so much of his artwork may be a reaction to Nara's own largely independent childhood.

Nara imitates traditional Edo-era art. In 2010-2022, Nara collaborated with Yasu Shibata at Pace Print’s exhibition to release mokuhanga, Ukiyo-e woodblock prints. In 1999, he released his 16 part “In the Floating World” series, which combined drawn on punk elements with famous Edo-prints.

Some American scholars categorize Nara’s art as avant-garde because he flattens popular culture to express the sublime, which is characteristic of American abstract art.

== Recent work ==
Nara exhibited work in New York at the Pace Gallery in May–April 2017. It was his first exhibition in New York since 2013. Entitled Thinker, the pieces exhibited represent a shift towards a more meditative body of work. Of this shift, Nara said, "In the past I would have an image that I wanted to create, and I would just do it. I would just get it finished. Now I take my time and work slowly and build up all these layers to find the best way. Just like you cook so that you know it’s going to be the most delicious, you find a way to make your art the best it can be."

In July 2017, The Toyota Municipal Museum of Art held a career retrospective of the artist's work, called for better or worse.

A retrospective of his work, including 100 pieces from 36 years, was exhibited at the Los Angeles County Museum of Art from April 1, 2021, to January 2, 2022.

In August 2025, Nara teamed with Japanese rock star Yoshiki to announce the "Y by Yoshiki x Yoshitomo Nara Collaboration Wine", featuring Nara's art designs for each label and bottle cap. The wine will be available in three variations and is set for release in February 2026.

== Selected exhibitions ==
- 2026 - "Yoshitomo Nara" - David Zwirner Gallery, New York
- 2024 - "Yoshitomo Nara" - Museum Frieder Burda
- 2024 - "Yoshitomo Nara" - Guggenheim Bilbao
- 2023 - "Yoshitomo Nara: All my little words" - ALBERTINA MODERN, Vienna
- 2018 - "Yoshitomo Nara: Ceramic Works and ..." - Pace, Hong Kong
- 2018 - "Drawings: 1988-2018 Last 30 Years" - Kaikai Kiki, Tokyo
- 2017 - "for better or worse" - Toyota Municipal Museum of Art, Aichi
- 2016 - "Yoshitomo Nara: New Works" - Stephen Friedman Gallery, London
- 2015 - "Shallow Puddles" - Blum and Poe, Tokyo
- 2014 - "Yoshitomo Nara" - Blum and Poe, Los Angeles
- 2009 - "15TH ANNIVERSARY INAUGURAL EXHIBITION" - Blum and Poe, Los Angeles
- 2008 - "Yoshitomo Nara and installation by YNG" - Blum and Poe, Los Angeles
- 2004 - "Yoshitomo Nara - New Works" - Blum and Poe, Los Angeles
- 2003 - "Inaugural Group Show" - Blum and Poe, Los Angeles
- 2001 - "YOSHITOMO NARA In the White Room: An Exhibition of Paintings and Drawings" - Blum and Poe, Santa Monica
- 1999 - "YOSHITOMO NARA An Exhibition of Sculpture in Two Parts (PARTS I & II)" - Blum and Poe, Santa Monica
- 1997 - "Yoshitomo Nara" - Blum and Poe, Santa Monica
- 1995 - "YOSHITOMO NARA: PACIFIC BABIES - Los Angeles International '95 In Cooperation with SCAI The Bathhouse, Tokyo" - Blum and Poe, Santa Monica

== Selected publications ==
- Koon, Yeewan (2020). Yoshitomo Nara. Phaidon.
- Koplos, Janet. "Making Space for Misfits: Yoshitomo Nara." Sculpture. Volume 30, Number 3. April 2011. p. 42-7. ISSN 0889-728X
- A to Z. Tokyo: Foil, 2007. ISBN 978-4902943160.

== Honours ==
- Medal with Purple Ribbon (2026)
