= Hiba Schahbaz =

Pakistani-American painter (born 1981)

Hiba Schahbaz is a Pakistani-American painter. Schahbaz was born in Karachi, Pakistan. She is known for her contemporary paintings that invoke classical styles. Schahbaz lives and works in New York.

== Early life and education ==
Schahbaz trained as a miniaturist painter at the National College of Arts in Lahore, Pakistan, and received an MFA degree from the Pratt Institute in Brooklyn.

== Career ==
She began her career painting with a series of miniature paintings, later expanding to larger scale works.

On her early work, she wrote: “I come from a very traditional family, but I drew nudes even when I was younger. I would just be sitting and drawing myself as a teenager. All over my bedroom walls were these drawings of me naked. No one said to me: ‘This is great, honey. This is what you should be doing.’"

== Exhibitions and Public Art ==
Schahbaz work has been included in numerous exhibitions. Her solo exhibitions include Summer of Dragons at Almine Rech London (2024), and Love Songs at Almine Rech Paris (2023).

Her group exhibitions include Brooklyn Museum (2024), FLAG Art Foundation (2023), Santa Monica Art Museum (2023), ICA Miami (2022), and the Northern Illinois University Art Museum (2018), among others. In 2021, she presented a public art commission at Rockefeller Centre with Art Production Fund.

In November 2025, Schahbaz opened her first major retrospective and museum solo, Hiba Schahbaz: The Garden at Museum of Contemporary Art, North Miami. The exhibition was curated by Jasmine Wahi, who gave the artist her first exhibition in Miami some years ago.

== Talks ==
Schahbaz has given several artist talks since 2013, notably at Yale University, Sotheby's Institute and Pratt Institute.
