= Ruby Chishti =

Pakistani-American artist

Ruby Chishti is a Pakistani-American artist known for her installation work with found materials. Interested in the ephemerality of memory, love, and loss, Chishti creates works that intersect universal human experience with culturally specific and biographical stories. She lives and works in Brooklyn, New York.

== Biography ==
Chishti was born in Jhang, Pakistan in 1963. She was the fourth daughter born to Safia Begum and Khushi Mohammed, whose first and sixth children were sons. Chishti felt the weight of gender discrimination within a patriarchal society from her birth which was met with distaste by family members who told Chishti they cried upon her birth at the disappointment of her not being a boy. The sentiment would later be explored in her work titled My birth will take place a thousand times no matter how you celebrate it.

Her interest in textiles and sculptural work began from childhood as she sewed dolls from fabric scraps, as she was taught to by her grandmother, and crafted toys from mud. As she grew, she learned how to alter her clothing and began to sew her own garments to express what she wanted to wear.

Chishti's father died of cancer at 47, and her older brother at 27.

She attended the National College of Arts (NCA) in Lahore, Pakistan, where she received her B.F.A in 1988. Her sculptural training at the institution was Western and classical in nature, working with materials such as clay, wood, and metal. Ultimately, she graduated with a thesis in painting. During her time at NCA, Chishti developed a close relationship with Khalil Chishti, a classmate who encouraged her practice. The two were married and moved in together following the former's graduation in 1988. Ruby Chishti's work and life was further transformed by a paralyzing stroke which left her mother bedridden and mentally impaired. In 1991, just three years after she graduated from NCA, Chishti put her career on hold to care for her mother. As a caretaker, she began to explore textiles, particularly discarded family garments and fabrics. She sewed at her mother's bedside, creating dolls in her mother's form as a remembrance for a soon to pass parent. During this period, Chishti supported her husband in his sculptural works and the pair worked together as studio assistants to the sculptor Shahid Sajjad. In 2000, Chishti returned to the NCA as a graduate student in the inaugural Master's of Arts in Visual Arts program. Ultimately, Chishti did not spend much time within the program, but it did serve an important role of reconnecting the artist to her practice. Chishti returned to the question of medium, experimenting with papier-mâché before deciding on fabric. After 11 years of care by Chishti and her sister, Tehseen from Sargodha, Chishti's mother died in the spring of 2002.

She was trained at El Dorado Center in Placerville, California and Art Foundry Gallery in Sacramento, California. During her early days in the U.S., Chishti worked in a corporate mail room sorting post for long hours and lifting heavy loads. The artist left most of her belongings in Lahore, as she anticipated to return to her family home soon after settling in the Bay Area. However, it was not until 2006 that Chishti returned, only to find her home and family's belongings were gone. The shocking loss profoundly impacted Chishti, who began to center the idea of home through architectural forms within her artwork.

In 2009, Chishti and her husband moved across the country to New York. In the fashion capital of New York City, Chishti began collecting textiles from thrift stores. Using second-hand ceremonial garments, discarded denim, and other evidence of fabric waste, Chishti transformed the unwanted materials through hand sewing techniques.

From 2012-2014, Chishti experienced health issues that delayed her practice. She continued to collect, layer, and sew together strips of fabric from discarded clothing, but it was not until she recovered that the artist was able to travel and pursue an artist residency in Colombo, Sri Lanka.

As a Cornell Council for the Arts Biennial Invitational Artist, Chishti was selected as the 2018 Critic in Residence in the Department of Fiber Science & Apparel Design at Cornell University. The department hosted Chishti for a residency and sponsored a solo exhibition of Chishti's work in the Jill Stuart Gallery.

Chishti now lives in Brooklyn, NY with her husband. The pair made the decision to abstain from having children as a result of reflecting on Chishti's difficult childhood and lack of familial love.

== Exhibitions and publications ==
Chishti's work has been exhibited globally, including but not limited to the Asia Society Museum, New York; the Queens Museum, Queens, NY; Aicon Contemporary, New York and London; Rossi & Rossi, Hong Kong; Vadehra Art Gallery, New Delhi; Canvas Gallery, Karachi; and ARCO Madrid. Her major works have been acquired by Kiran Nadar Museum of Art, in Delhi, and the Qatar Museum.

Various publications have featured Chishti's work including The New York Times, Art Asia Pacific, and Diacritics. She has also been written about in a number of books including Unveiling the Visible and Memory-Metaphor-Mutations by Salima Hashmi and Yashodhara Dalmia; The Eye Still Seeks: Pakistani Contemporary Art by Salima Hashmi and Matand Khosla; A Companion to Textile Culture, ed. Dana Arnold and Jennifer Harris; and Threads of Globalization: Women, Textiles, and Fashion in Asia, ed. Melia Belli Bose.

== Fabric usage ==
Chishti's early works utilizes fabrics that tie to familial relationships and her various iterations of "home," while her later works reference a larger global issue of mass consumption and consumer waste within the fast fashion industry. Upon the loss of her father and older brother, Chishti found herself unable to discard the clothes that remained after their passing. Her approach to recycling fabrics was both a technique of imbuing personal memory into her sculptures but also a result of the scarcity mindset she grew up with. Raised in an environment with limited resources, Chishti was taught to care for items, repurpose them, and mend that which could still be functional. Thus, her utilization of fabric scraps was not initially an eco-critical commentary but rather a practice stemming from sentimentality and lived experience.

In preparation to migrate to the U.S., Chishti gathered scraps of fabric from her family and her own clothing and filled a suitcase with textiles she could not part with. At first Chishti worked exclusively with fabrics that held a personal connection, but upon moving to New York, she took interest in the discarded clothing found in thrift stores and the anonymous memories the garments hold. Chishti's slow hand sewing practice allows her to form a sense of kinship through care, treating the fabrics with the same sensitivity she would offer their former owners.

Dr. Saleema Waraich writes about Chishti's textile practice not only through an anti-capitalist lens but also through that of Sufi philosophy. The art historian connects Chishti's selection of a medium that has been historically regarded as lowly due to its association with women's domestic labor and folk craft to the principles of modesty and humility emphasized in Sufi thought.

== Themes and iconography ==
=== Crows ===
The crow is a recurring feature within Chishti's work that holds various meanings. Her relationship to the birds stems from childhood memories in nature, observing the crows and feeling them watching her family life unfolding as well. Chishti recalls the constant presence of crows despite the movement her family endured as a result of her father's work as an engineer who was posted in a new location every couple of months. The birds became an inextricable part of Chishti's understanding of home and place, eventually entering her work, often made of wire and fabric or straw and chaff.

The behavior of crows aligns with the themes of loss and pain in the human experience that Chishti explores within her work. She was drawn to the crows' tendency to allow smaller birds to attack when they were exploited and for the whole flock to caw in a cacophony of mourning when just one bird was injured.

Like a bird, Chishti at times collects twigs, chaff, straw, and brushwood. From these nesting materials, the artist binds and manipulates the natural fibers into sculptural forms like a bicycle in Memory of a Faded Future, 2006, and a madonna and child-inspired pairing in Sketch of a Faded Memory, 2006.

=== Dolls ===
Chishti's work often features traditional handmade fabric dolls. Coming from a context in which women teach young girls to make such toys from residual cloth, Chishti's doll-making began as a form of youthful entertainment and now acts as a reference to the matrilineal teaching of women's labor and craft within a South Asian cultural heritage. Chishti was taught by her grandmother and returned to the practice as she became a caretaker for her ailing mother.

Free Hugs, 2002, exemplifies the distinctive plushy form of Chishti's fabric dolls. The stuffed figures evoke soft comfort of the body in embrace. The artwork is composed of 10 female dolls, arranged in pairs sharing the warmth of holding one another. In a biographical sense, the empathetic dolls embody the warmth and familial love Chishti longed for as a child. Left alone to entertain herself, she spent much of her time making soft figures to play with. Now, the organic forms of women assembled from recycled fabric exude the fragility of the human experience to overwhelming experiences of love and loss.

=== Women ===
Chishti references women and the process of menstruation through her use of sanitary pads within her sculptural work. Chishti complicates motherhood as both a cyclical process of life giving and a status that condemns women to domestic roles. Her 2006 work Armour features the head of a baby whose body is composed of sanitary pads sewn together like a spectre. Offering the option of a child or the alternative of a menstrual period, Chishti's work both acknowledges the dangerous patriarchal society experienced by women living in Pakistan—many of whom view childbirth as a means of protection against threats to their survival—and the realities of bringing a child into such a world.

The titles of Chishti's works also at times evoke her feminist thinking. The Only Blindspot in History III, 2020, features the backs of ten female dolls standing or laying in a row while little birds watch over them. The work alludes to both female aging as an eventual liberation from the male gaze and more largely toward women's rights as a major blindspot within an oppressive patriarchal society.
