= The Compleat Sculptor =

American retailer of sculpture supplies

- Industry: Sales of sculpture tools and supplies
- Founded: 1995
- Founder: Marc Fields; Ailene Fields
- Headquarters: 110 West 19 Street New York, New York, USA
- Website: The Compleat Sculptor, Inc.

The Compleat Sculptor, Inc., is an American retailer of sculpture supplies. Established in New York City in 1995 as a comprehensive source of sculptural materials and tools, it is one of the largest sculptural materials suppliers in the world. It also provides classes and related services for professional sculptors, as well as other users of sculptural materials, such as movie and television set designers and law enforcement forensic teams.

== Background ==
Marc and Ailene Fields started The Compleat Sculptor as a family business in 1995. The company was founded to supply basic media for sculptors such as clays, various stone materials, and many types of wood, as well as tools needed to work on sculpting materials. The company also began offering product demonstrations and classes: stone carving, wood carving, clay work, wax work, foam sculpting, and multimedia workshops. Robin Finn of The New York Times characterized the store as, "...peeling walls, scaly ceilings and scarred linoleum floors. The place is not pretty. But that is not the point. Sculptors and other artisans gather here the way handymen haunt the cobweb-covered aisles of old hardware stores." Since its founding, The Compleat Sculptor has steadily increased its store and catalog product lines, as well as its customer base, making it one of the largest suppliers of its kind in the world.

== Products and services ==
The company's basic stone sculptural materials inventory includes 300 tons of marble, alabaster, granite and soapstone. The store also supplies other sculpting media (clay, cast metal, ceramic, wood, polymers, composite materials and glass) and sculpting tools (chisels, sanders, grinders, polishes). The company maintains a 15,000-item inventory to provide supplies for a diverse clientele. The customer base includes professional sculptors, prop artists for stage and television programs, museum conservators, archaeologists, law enforcement needing media for crime-scene restorations and ballistics molds, and first responders creating fake wounds for triage training, as well as arts and crafts clients.

Company services include finishing and polishing stone sculptures, kiln firing clay sculptures, foundry services for bronze castings, resin formulations, and mounting and shipping services for finished works. The company custom-designs some rasps and resins, and has also ventured into product prototyping for architectural businesses, including reproduction of bricks, architectural details, and decorative elements in new construction or building restoration.
