= Murtaza Jafri =

Pakistani artist and Vice Chancellor of National College of Arts

- Education: National College of Arts, BFA (1982–1986); Chelsea College of Arts, MA (1996–1997) University of East London, PhD (1998–2002)
- Known for: Vice Chancellor of National College of Arts, Painting, Printmaking, Sculpture, Fine Art
- Movement: Pop Art, Traditional Art

Murtaza Jafri (Urdu: مرتضیٰ جعفری) is a Pakistani painter, draftsman, sculptor and college professor. He has also been the principal and vice chancellor at National College of Arts since August 2013.

== Early life and education ==
He studied in Fine Arts at National College of Arts, Lahore in 1986. In 1997, he completed his master's degree at Chelsea College of Arts at London, England. In 1998, he joined University of East London in London for PhD in Fine Art. He also studied at the University of Brighton in England, Concordia University in Canada, Université de Montréal in Canada, and Algonquin College also in Canada.

== Career ==
Jafri has been teaching fine arts since 1987 at National College of Arts, Lahore. He has also supervised PhD candidates in leading universities of Pakistan and abroad. He became a director at Pakistan National Council of the Arts, Islamabad from 1989 to 1990.

In August 2013, he was appointed as the principal and vice chancellor of the National College of Arts.
