= Raja Changez Sultan =

Pakistani artist

- Born: 6 December 1949 (age 76); Shakarparian, Pakistan
- Education: Shrewsbury School. Trinity College (Connecticut), Columbia University
- Known for: Poetry, Oil Painting
- Style: Landscape, Portraits, Charcoals
- Website: https://rajachangezsultan.com/

Raja Changez Sultan (born 6 December 1949) is a Pakistani poet and painter. He produces landscape and portrait paintings in both oil and charcoal and has published several books of poetry.

He has held over 70 exhibitions in Austria, England, Switzerland, Oman, and Pakistan, with the most notable ones at the Winter Palace in Vienna (1992) and Cadogan Contemporary in London (1991).

== Biography ==
=== Early life and education ===
Born in his family's ancestral village of Shakarparian. He attended Lawrence College, Ghora Gali before earning a full scholarship to Shrewsbury School in England. He then went on to study at Trinity College and Columbia University. At Columbia he completed two master's degrees, one in journalism and the other in creative writing and painting.

=== Career beginnings ===
He worked at the United Nations and the World Health Organisation in Geneva for two years, and then returned to Pakistan to serve in the tourism sector.

=== Pakistan Tourism Development Corporation (PTDC) ===
He worked for over 25 years in the tourism sector of Pakistan.

=== Pakistan National Council of Arts ===
Sultan was appointed as director general for the Pakistan National Council of the Arts in Islamabad where he advanced the work of artists, thinkers, writers, and the visual and performing arts. During his four-and-a-half year tenure at the Pakistan National Council of Arts (PNCA), Sultan helped spearhead over 60 major visual arts exhibitions which included photography, paintings and sculptures. During his tenure at the PNCA, he helped organise events such as the National Drama Festival and National Music Festival.

== Artistic work ==
=== Paintings ===
His first series of paintings was The Divided Self to showcase the multiple personalities we each have in us. His second series was The Himalayan Odyssey based on his travel in the mountains. Another series called The Crucifixion of Eve which is to represent how women are put on the cross everyday as she bears the brunt of responsibility of the world,

=== Poetry ===
Sultan has written four books on poetry exploring the themes of his ancestral home, the himalayan mountains and human psycohology.

== Selected publications ==
The following books have been authored by Sultan:

- Thirteen Ways of looking at a Nomad (1982)
- Shakarparian (1998)
- The Death of Indifference (2022)
- Himalayan Odyssey (2023)

== Exhibitions ==
1. Discovery Art Gallery, Upper Montclair, New Jersey, USA. 1974
2. Montclair Hospital Gallery, Montclair, New Jersey, USA 1974
3. Rawalpindi Club, Rawalpindi 1985
4. Alhamra Art Gallery, Lahore, 1986
5. Interiors Art Gallery, Islamabad 1986
6. Interiors Art Gallery, Islamabad 1987
7. Nairang Art Gallery, Lahore 1987
8. French Cultural Centre, Islamabad 1990
9. Chaukandi Art Gallery, Karachi 1990
10. National Art Gallery, Islamabad 1991
11. Cadogan Contemporary, London 1991
12. Folk Kunde Museum, Winter Palace, Vienna 1992
13. National Art Gallery, Islamabad 1992
14. Panhans Art Gallery, Semmering 1992
15. Sacre Coeur Art Gallery, Vienna 1993
16. National Art Gallery, Islamabad 1995
17. Art Gallery, Islamabad 1995
18. National Art Gallery, Islamabad 1996
19. Edwarde's College, Peshawar 1996
20. Art Gallery, Islamabad 1996
21. Nomad Gallery, Islamabad 1997
22. Majmua Art Gallery, Karachi 1997
23. American Centre, Islamabad 1998
24. Soni Gallery, London 1998
25. French Cultural Center, Islamabad 1999
26. French Cultural Center, Islamabad 1999
27. Chaukandi Gallery, Karachi 1999
28. Croweaters Gallery, Lahore 2000
29. Le Chat Gallery, Geneva 2000
30. Chaukandi Gallery, Karachi 2000
31. Gallerichangez, Islamabad 2001
32. Clifton Art Gallery, Karachi 2002
33. Alliance Francaise, Islamabad 2002
34. Chaukandi Gallery, Karachi 2003
35. Gallerichangez, Karachi 2003
36. Clifton Art Gallery, Karachi 2004
37. Gallerie Changez, Islamabad 2004
38. Royaat Gallery, Lahore 2004
39. Khas Galery, Islamabad 2004
40. Chaukandi Art Gallery, Karachi 2005
41. Bait Al Muzna, Oman 2005
42. Ijaz Gallery, Lahore 2006
43. Chaukandi Gallery, Karachi 2006
44. Royaat Gallery, Lahore 2007
45. Tanzara Gallery, Islamabad 2007
46. Collector's Galleria, Lahore 2008
47. Tanzara Gallery, Islamabad 2008
48. Louvre Gallery, Karachi 2009
49. Native Art Gallery, Lahore 2009
50. Tanzara Gallery, Islamabad 2023
