= Arbab Mohammad Sardar =

Pakistani painter and sculptor

- Born: 1945; Landi Arbab, Peshawar, Pakistan
- Died: 2016 (aged 70–71)
- Education: Institute of Professionals in Carrara, Italy
- Known for: Painter and sculptor
- Awards: Pride of Performance (Pakistan)

Arbab Mohammad Sardar Khan (1945–2016) was a Pakistani painter, sculptor and a recipient of Presidential award for Pride of Performance.

== Personal life ==
He belongs to a family of Arbabs of Khyber Pukhtunkhwa. He started sketching from an early age later he joined Abasin Arts Council Peshawar. His first exhibition of calligraphy was held in 1962 in Islamia College (Peshawar). He learned sketching, drawing and painting in water colour, oil colour, charcoal etc. Along with painting, Arbab Sardar started making models in clay, later in plaster of paris and finally in fiber glass. During his college time he was offered a fellowship from Italian government in sculptures. He went to the institute in Carrara. He studied architecture, decorative art and sculpture in marble.

== Work ==
=== Teaching Spell ===
- Iran cultural centre Peshawar 1973-75-76-78.
- Ladies club Peshawar university 1977–78.
- Peshawar garrison club 1977–78.
- Quetta staff college 1978.
- Frontier college for women Peshawar city 1978–79.
- Abasin arts Council Peshawar 1979–92.
- College of Architecture Peshawar city 1995–96.
- Jinnah College for women Peshawar University 2003–04.
- Private Art Gallery of Arbab Sardar.

=== Representation in national and international collection ===
- Cherat mess 1979.
- Governor house Peshawar 1979.
- State bank building Peshawar 1983.
- Artillery mess Nowshehra 1985.
- National Assembly building Islamabad 1986.
- N.D.F.C regional office Peshawar 1988.
- 3 Murals (relief) in Jinnah Park, Peshawar 1989.
- Sculpture relief Mardan 1991.
- Mural relief (fibre glass) at gateway to KPK 1992.
- Large Mural (relief) in locomotive factory Risalpur 1993.
- A big cultural statue at College Chowk Mardan 1995.
- Sculpture on Khattak dance in ministry of foreign affairs.
- A relief art work of Khattak dance displayed at Michani post Torkham.
- Some of the art pieces depicting the culture of KPK have been displayed at Army Mess Torkham.
- Painting in Prime Minister House Islamabad.

=== Exhibitions ===
Solo Exhibitions

- Peshawar 1962-70-72-77.
- Afghanistan 1971.
- Italy 1975–76.
- Islamabad 1978–88.
- Quetta staff college 1978.
- National Art Gallery Islamabad 1999.

Group Exhibitions

- Peshawar 1962-74-75-80-82-83.
- Islamabad 1973-80-81.
- Italy (Carrara) 1975–76.
- Japan 1980.
- China 1980.
- Bangladesh 1980.
- Quetta 1988.
- Karachi 1988.
- Nathiagali Governor House 1997.
