= Saira Wasim =

Saira Wasim is a contemporary artist from Lahore, Pakistan. She currently lives in United States. Wasim uses the miniature style of painting, pioneered by the Persians but extensively used in South Asia, to make primarily political and cultural art. Wasim's art has been shown in a number of museums including the Whitney Museum of American Art, Brooklyn Museum of Art, and Asian Art Museum.

== Biography ==
Wasim went to National College of Arts (in Lahore), from where she graduated with a Bachelors in Fine Arts with focus in miniature painting in 1999. Dawn art critic Ali Adil Khan describes her as part of "magnificent seven" along with Muhammed Imran Qureshi, Tazeen Qayyum, Aisha Khalid, Talha Rathore, Nusra Latif Qureshi, and Reeta Saeed- who brought back miniatures

== Artistic approach ==
Wasim draws Persian Miniatures to make devastating political commentary.

Wasim has stated:

"My work uses the contemporary miniature form to explore social and political issues that divide the modern world. This series, Battle for Hearts and Minds, illustrates the clash between imperialism in the west and fundamentalism in the east, and questions the underlying motivations and uneasy alliances that keep this conflict going. My work offers a voice against this ignorance and prejudice. It pleas for social justice, respect, and tolerance through the use of caricature and satire."

The New York Times describes her work as "exquisite political cartoons that conjure William Hogarth and sometimes borrow directly from Norman Rockwell."
