= Albemarle Gallery =

Art gallery in London

Coordinates: 51.50805°N 0.14110°W

Albemarle Gallery was an art gallery located in Mayfair, London. The gallery opened in 1986 and featured figurative to hyper-realist artwork by local and international contemporary painters and sculptors. This gallery closed in 1993.

== History ==
In 1986, Mark Glazebrook, a private art dealer with an interest in modern British painting and drawing opened Albemarle Gallery on Piccadilly. The gallery featured over 100 artists in its first three and a half years. The gallery closed in 1993. Glazebrook died in 2009.
