= Madiha Sikander =

Madiha Sikander (1987—) is a Pakistani visual artist and writer interested in contemporary miniature painting, altering the medium's history through her use of realism.

== Early life and education ==
Sikander's family immigrated from Bihar, India to Bangladesh in reaction to the social and political upheaval following Indian independence. They then relocated to Pakistan following the 1971 war. The artist was born in Hyderabad, Pakistan in 1987. Coming from a family of doctors and surgeons, Sikander's pursuit of the arts came as a surprise. She attended the National College of Arts in Lahore where she specialized in Mughal miniature painting. Sikander graduated in 2009 with distinction for her thesis project titled, "Anonymous." The artist continued on to receive her M.F.A. from the University of British Columbia, where she focused her thesis on her family history of displacement.

== Artistic practice ==
The artist takes interest in building layers that transcend time, while also relating to personal, social, and political realities and illusions. Sikander utilizes found objects and materials within her practice, drawing from ephemera, photographs, and trinkets from flea markets. She often uses pre-owned books as a foundation for her work, adding painting, doodles, text, and images to the pages. Sikander often pairs the old and new, adding her own touch to historical practices like the 16th century Iranian technique of Siyah Qalam (Black Pen) or taking inspiration from family photographs of the pre-partition days. In doing so, the artist evokes the idea of a romantic past that lingers in memory.

Recently, Sikander's work has taken the form of a beaded curtain made of monofilaments and cloves that emit scent before the viewer enters the space of installation in her work titled Majmuā.

== Exhibition history ==
- Off the Wall at Twelve Gates, Philadelphia, USA (2010)
- Two is a Company at Canvas Gallery, Karachi, Pakistan (2011)
- Soul of Pakistan at ARTrium, Singapore (2011)
- Icon: Rani at Alhamra Art Gallery, Lahore, Pakistan (2011)
- Becoming at Colombo Art Biennale, Sri Lanka (2012)
- The Mughal of Modern Times at Basel, JanKossen Contemporary, Switzerland (2012)
- Modern Life at Taseer Art Gallery, Lahore, Pakistan (2013)
- Home is Where… at Koel Gallery, Karachi, Pakistan (2013)
- Bachon Se Tabdeli at Mohatta Palace Museum, Karachi, Pakistan (2014)
- Kochi-Muziris Biennale, India (2014)
- Missing at Canvas Gallery, Karachi, Pakistan (2015)
- India Art Fair (2016, 2017 & 2019)
- The Reading Room: Exhibition of Book Art from South Asia at Saffron Art, New York, USA (2016)
- Tracing Erasure 41st Annual Graduate Symposium, at the University of British Columbia, Canada (2018)
- Postscript: MFA Graduate Exhibition at the Morris and Helen Belkin Art Gallery, at the University of British Columbia, Canada (2018)
- Out of your Shadow at Gallery Espace, New Delhi, India (2019)
- Something More than Nothing at The Reach Gallery Museum, Abbotsford, Canada (2019)
- Seismic Movements at Dhaka Art Summit, Bangladesh (2020)
- The Unknown Guest’ at Canvas Gallery, Karachi, Pakistan (2021)
- Pickup Notes at Kunstinstituut Melly, Rotterdam, Netherlands (2024–2025)

== Workshops and residencies ==
In 2012, Sikander was part of the 11th Wasanii International Artist's Workshop at Kuona Trust, Kenya and Regional Workshop, Theertha.

She was later awarded UNESCO Aschberg Bursary for Emerging Artists in 2014, through which she pursued a residency at the Bundanon Trust in Illaroo, NSW, Australia. During the residency, Sikander worker on a series titled Pockets Full of Poses, an exploration of the history of post-colonial Pakistani society and its Western, Indian, and Islamic/Arabic influences. The project also explores children as social agents through photographic installation.

== Select publications ==
- Madiha Sikander and Rajarshi Sengupta, "Versions of Contemporaneity: Revisiting the Qualifier 'Indigenous'," in Rungh 5, no. 3 (March 2018).
- Madiha Sikander and Candice Okada, "Playing Slow," Research in Arts and Education 2 (June 2021).
