= Zehra Javeri =

Pakistani artist (born 1971)

- Born: 15 October 1971 (age 54); Karachi, Pakistan
- Occupation: Artist

Zehra Laila Javeri (Urdu: زہرہ لیلی جویری; born on 15 October 1971) is a Pakistani artist. She currently resides in Karachi, Pakistan. Javeri's first solo exhibition, titled 'Weeds', opened at Canvas Gallery, Karachi in January 2014. Javeri was greatly influenced by her aunt, artist Laila Shahzada. Javeri's second non-solo show, titled 'Pakistan Art Today', was held in the Lalit Hotel in Delhi, India.

== Early life ==
Zehra Javeri is the daughter of jeweller Hassan Ali Mohammad Javeri and Ayesha Javeri. She has four siblings, including photographer Tapu Javeri and retired civil servant Rabiya Javeri Agha. She went to Convent of Jesus and Mary for her early education and then to Mount Holyoke College, Massachusetts, to study anthropology. After that she went to England for her master's degree at the London School of Economics and returned to Pakistan.

Javeri (from the family that lent its name to Mumbai's Zaveri Bazar) traces her roots back to Jamnagar, Gujarat, where her ancestors were court jewellers to the Nawabs of Kutch.

== Career ==
Javeri has been painting and creating art from her early years. She had her first show at the Canvas Gallery in Karachi, entitled 'Weeds'. "She has incorporated many global themes into her work, especially regarding gender," said Marjorie Husain, a Pakistani critic, 'as she pointed at a painting that was about the Serbian War.'

Her second non-solo show, 'Pakistan Art Today', was held at the Lalit Hotel in Delhi. It featured the work of 11 Pakistani artists and "was curated by Islamabad based gallery MyArtWorld and formed part of the larger Aalishan Pakistan trade show to Delhi". Javeri was accompanied by many other Pakistani artists such as sculptor Amin Gulgee, photographer Tapu Javeri, miniaturist Sahyr Sayed and pop artist Summayya Jillani. Art icon Satish Gujral lit the lamp to open the exhibition and also initiated the live painting. In fact, Javeri and a few other Pakistani artists, created a painting with Gujral.
