= Muniba Mazari =

Pakistani artist, motivational speaker and human rights activist

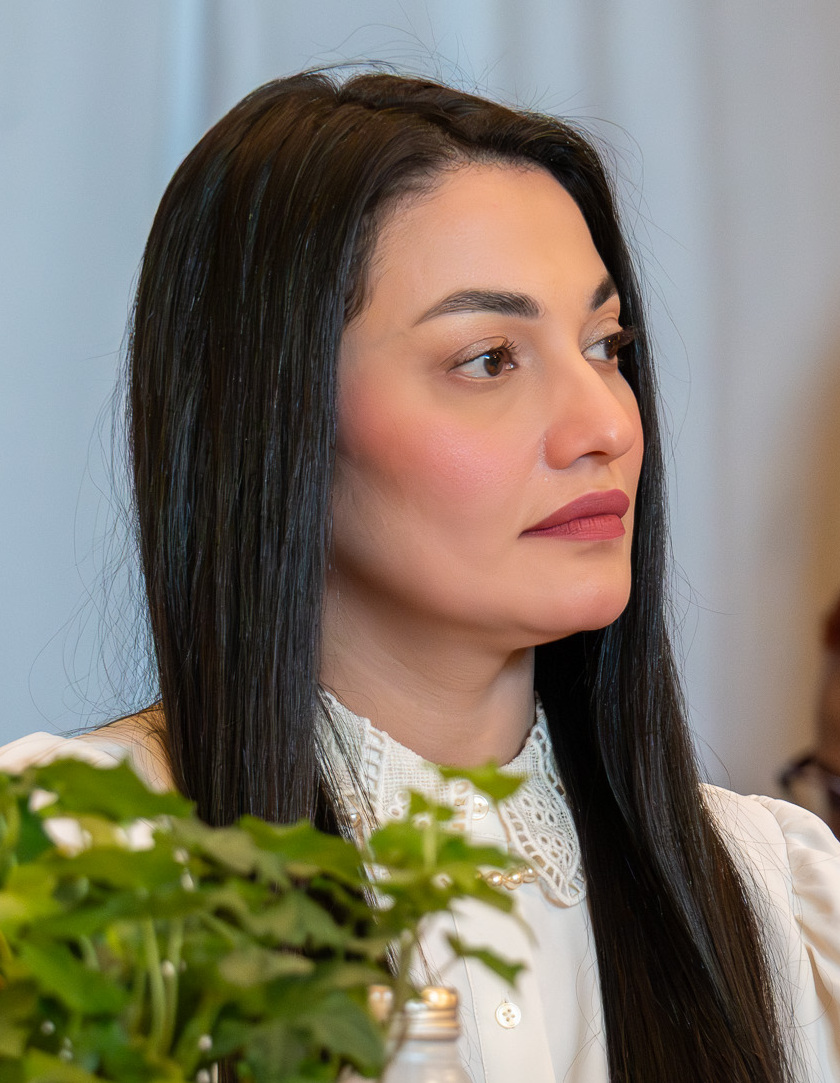
- Born: 3 March 1987 (age 39); Rahim Yar Khan, Punjab, Pakistan
- Occupations: Artist, activist, motivational speaker, singer and model
- Children: 1 (adopted)
- Website: www.munibamazari.com

Muniba Mazari Baloch (Baloch: منیبہ مزاری; born 3 March 1987) is a Pakistani activist, anchor, artist, model, singer and motivational speaker. She became the National Ambassador UN Women Pakistan by BBC in 2015. She also made it to the Forbes 30 under 30 list for 2016.

== Personal life ==
Muniba Mazari Baloch belongs to the Baloch Mazari tribe. She was born in Rahim Yar Khan, in southern Punjab on 3 March 1987. Muniba went to the Army Public School, and later attended college in her native home town for a BFA. At the age of 18, before she could complete her studies, she was married. In 2008, she was involved in a crash, which left her paraplegic.

=== Crash and recovery ===
On 27 February 2008, Muniba and her husband were travelling from Quetta to Rahim Yar Khan. Their car was in a crash, in which she sustained several major injuries, including broken bones in her arm (both radius and ulna), rib-cage, shoulder blade, collarbone and spine. The spinal injury left her entire lower body paralysed. She was taken to a nearby hospital, which was ill-equipped to deal with such a severe case. She was then moved to a hospital in Rahim Yar Khan, and eventually to the Aga Khan University Hospital, Karachi. Post-surgery, she was left bed-ridden for two years. Physiotherapy started, which helped her recover enough to use a wheelchair.

After treatment for her injuries, Muniba moved to Rawalpindi. In 2011, four years after the crash, Muniba adopted her son, Niele.

== Career ==
Muniba Mazari has gained fame in multiple areas, as an artist, activist, anchor, model, singer and motivational speaker. Most of her career, however, has been built on painting and motivational speaking.

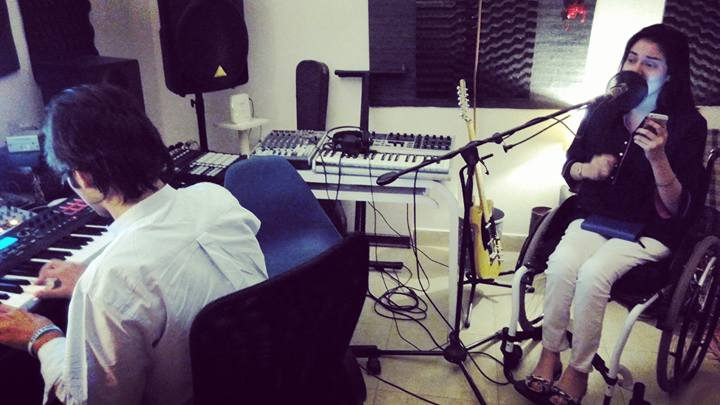
Muniba Mazari at earodrome productions with Asad Ali Khan in 2015

While painting, she found a job working for Areeb Azhar to run her Facebook page for monthly wages. She also started work at her son's school for a startup project called Dheeray Bolo (Speak Slowly), which involved teaching Urdu at various schools. The managing director of Pakistan Television (PTV) at the time, Mohammad Malick, learnt about her because of her TED talk, and asked her to work at PTV. She also worked for Clown Town in September 2014, which allowed her to work with children and the elderly.

Apart from this, Muniba was chosen by Pond's as the Pond's Miracle Woman. She was also chosen by international hairdressing salon, Toni & Guy, to become the first-ever wheelchair-using model in Asia. Her first campaign for them was called Women of Substance.

=== Artist ===
Muniba started painting on her hospital bed. Her medium is acrylics on canvas. With the slogan, Let Your Walls Wear Colours, she created her own art brand called Muniba's Canvas. She has presented her work in exhibitions, including a six-day exhibition held in Lahore from 19 April 2016 to 24 April 2016. This exhibition was held at Collectors Galleria and displayed 27 acrylic paintings.

Her first International exhibition was held in Dubai - entitled And I Choose To Live - at the Pakistan Association Dubai. The two-day exhibition - hosted by the Embassy of Pakistan, Poetic Strokes and The Collectors Galleria, Lahore - was inaugurated by Moazzam Ahmad Khan, the Pakistani ambassador to the UAE.

She has displayed her art in several other exhibitions, as well as for charity.

== Awards and honours ==
- 100 Inspirational Women of 2015 (BBC)
- 500 most influential Muslims of the world
- First Pakistani UN GoodWill Ambassador for UN Women
- Forbes 30 Under 30 - 2016
- The Karic Brothers Awards 2017 in Serbia by The Karic Foundation

=== The Karic Brothers Award ===
Muniba Mazari received Karic Brothers Award in Belgrade, Serbia under the category of humanitarian services.
