= Sughra Rababi =

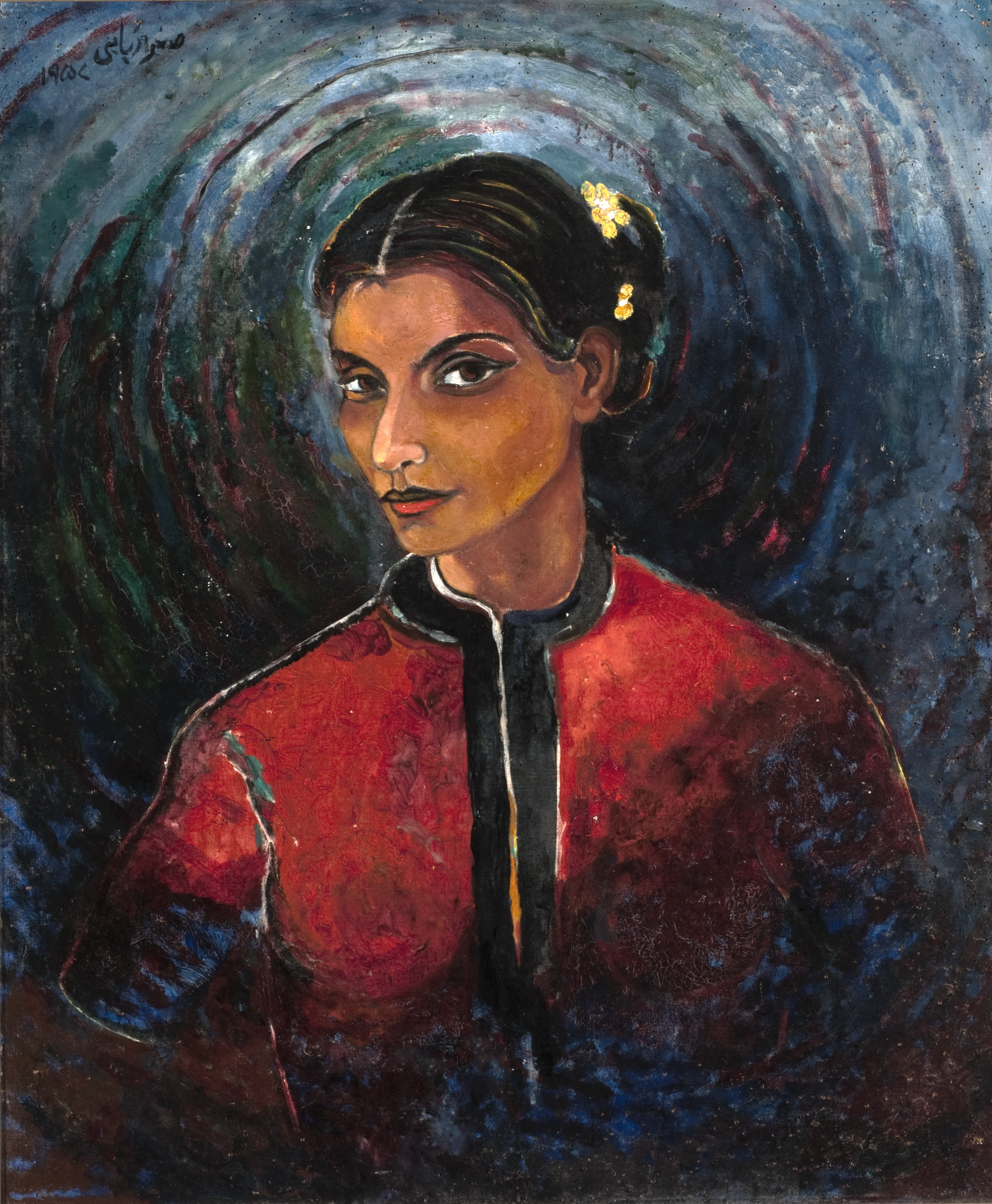
- Sughra Rababi (1922–1994), Self Portrait. 1957. Oil on Board. Courtesy, Dr. Zeba F Vanek Collection, Los Angeles, California.
- Born: Sughra; 1922
- Died: 1994 (aged 71–72)
- Known for: Painter, designer, sculptor
- Awards: All India Painting Competition Award (1940)

Sughra Rababi (1922–1994) was an artist born in British India, who later lived in Pakistan. As a young female artist in the 1940s, she was the first woman to win the All India Painting Competition Award. A versatile painter, designer and sculptor, Rababi was described by her fans as "a woman far ahead of her times".

Rababi donated most of the proceeds from sales of her art to support humanitarian causes. In recognition and memory of her artistic and charitable contributions, UNICEF created a Sughra Rababi Fund and the Mayor of San Francisco declared 19 January 1994 as Sughra Rababi Day in San Francisco.

Rababi, an accomplished painter, did her graduate studies at the Saranagati School of Art in Karachi and her post-graduate studies at the Shantiniketan Fine Arts University in Bengal, India. Her art career spanned more than five decades and she exhibited her works in solo and group exhibitions throughout her life. Her last solo exhibition was held in 1992 in San Francisco, California. Rababi's art was original and her style versatile. She was a prolific artist and created landscapes, figurative and calligraphic paintings and used tempera, oil and acrylic as her mediums. Rababi was also a designer and sculptor.

Posthumous reproductions of her art have been sold to support humanitarian causes.
