= Yeewan Koon =

Hong Kong art historian, art critic, and curator

- Born: Hong Kong

Academic background
- Education: Institute of Fine Arts; New York University; School of Oriental and African Studies
- Thesis: Literati Iconoclasm: Violence and Estrangement in the Art of Su Renshan (1814-ca. 1850)
- Doctoral advisor: Jonathan Hay

Academic work
- Discipline: Art historian
- Sub-discipline: Late imperial and modern Chinese art, Japanese contemporary art
- Institutions: University of Hong Kong

Yeewan Koon is a Hong Kong-based art historian, curator, and academic specializing in late imperial and modern Chinese art and Japanese contemporary art. She is an associate professor and the chair of the Department of Art History at the University of Hong Kong, where she also serves as Associate Dean of Global. She is a prominent scholar of Yoshitomo Nara and author of a 2020 book on the artist.

== Early life and education ==
Koon was born in Hong Kong and lived in Yuen Long in the New Territories before moving to the United Kingdom with her family at age six, growing up in Holloway, London. She graduated from SOAS University of London, where she studied Asian art history.

In 1996, Koon moved to the United States to pursue graduate studies at the New York University Institute of Fine Arts. She completed her PhD under the supervision of Chinese art historian Jonathan Hay.

== Career ==
Koon joined the University of Hong Kong (HKU) in 2005, with a mandate to revitalize the Chinese and Japanese art history courses. She has served as chair of the Department of Art History since 2019 and was appointed Associate Dean of Global in 2023. During her tenure, she established the MA Programme in Art History and has developed student exchange partnerships with institutions in Singapore, Vietnam, and Scotland.

Koon has received numerous awards for her teaching, including the HKU Faculty of Arts Teaching Award (2014), the HKU Outstanding Teaching Award (2020), and the University Grants Committee Teaching Award (2021).

Her co-curated section Faultlines at the 2018 Gwangju Biennale examined how systems of power manifest in daily decision-making, featuring artists including Byron Kim and Luke Ching Chin Wai exploring infrapolitics. The section was described as "brilliantly curated" and also included Yoshitomo Nara's Tobiu (2018), one of his most political works, as well as Aernout Mik's video installation Double Bind (2018).

Her monograph on Yoshitomo Nara (2020) has been translated into Japanese (2023) and Korean (2022) and is considered the definitive scholarly work on the artist. Nara credited Koon's interview process for the book as influential in helping him conceptualize his own exhibitions in new ways.

Koon is an Acquisition Committee member for M+ and a board member for Para Site. She is also a member of the International Association of Art Critics.

== Publications ==
=== Books ===
- Defiant Brush: Su Renshan and the Politics of Painting in Early Nineteenth Century Guangdong. Columbia University Press/Hong Kong University Press. 2014. ISBN 978-988-8139-61-3.
- It Begins with Metamorphosis: Xu Bing. Hong Kong University Press. 2014. ISBN 978-988-12272-3-2.
- Yoshitomo Nara. Phaidon. 2020. ISBN 978-0-7148-7994-9.

=== Articles ===
- "Lives and Afterlives: Luo Ping's Guiqu tu (Ghost Amusement scroll)" in Orientations Vol. 40 (September 2009)
- "The Face of Diplomacy in Nineteenth Century China: Qiying's Portrait Gifts" in Narratives of Free Trade: The Commercial Cultures of Early American Chinese Relations, edited by Kendall Johnson (2012), Hong Kong University Press
- "The Art of Tales: Qing Novels and Paintings by Su Renshan (1814–c.1850)" in Rethinking Visual Narratives in Asian Art: Intercultural and Comparative Perspectives, edited by Alexandra Green (2012), Hong Kong University Press
- "Narrating the City: Pu Qua and the Depiction of Street Life" in Qing Encounters: Artistic Exchanges Between China and the West, edited by Petra ten-Doesschate Chu and Ding Ning (2015), Getty Publications
- "The Dilemma of Disciplines: HK art and visual culture" in Podium, M+ Stories (2017)
- "A Chinese Canton? Painting the Local in Export Art" in 18th Century Art Worlds: Global and Local Geographies, edited by Stacey Sloboda and Michael Yonan (2019), Bloomsbury Academic
- "Where Are We Now? M+ and the Uncertain Future of Hong Kong" in October Vol. 180 (June 2022)
- "Marks and Manifestations: Religious Art by Su Renshan (1814-c.1850)" in China 1800: Visual and Material Culture, edited by Jessica Harrison-Hall (2024), British Museum Press

== Selected curatorial work ==
- It Begins with Metamorphosis: Xu Bing, Asia Society Hong Kong Centre (2014)
- Faultlines (co-curator with Yeon Shim Chung), Gwangju Biennale (2018)
- So long, thanks again for the fish, Levyhalli, Helsinki (2021)
- Everything is a Projection: Sheung Yiu, WMA, Hong Kong (2024)
- My Imperfect Self: Yoshitomo Nara, Blum Gallery, Los Angeles (2025)

== Honors and fellowships ==
- Collaborative Reading-Workshop Grant, Henry Luce Foundation/American Council of Learned Societies Program in China Studies (2015)
- Mary Griggs Burke Visiting Scholar, Columbia University (2016)
- Visiting Fellow, Hughes Hall, Cambridge (2016)
- Fulbright Scholar, Bard Graduate Center(2019)
- Knowledge Exchange Award, University of Hong Kong Faculty of Arts (2020)
