= Ayessha Quraishi =

Pakistani visual artist

- The artist
- Born: Ayessha Quraishi; October 28, 1970; Karachi, Pakistan
- Known for: Painting, art journals, video, digital imaging, drawing, sculpture
- Movement: Abstract art
- Website: ayesshaquraishi.com

Ayessha Quraishi (born October 28, 1970) is a Pakistani artist.

== Art career ==
=== Solo shows ===
- Mid-career retrospective “Between Light” at Koel Gallery, Karachi (2020)
- "All that is, is held" at Canvas Gallery, Karachi (2018)
- "Open presence" at Koel Gallery, Karachi (2016)
- "Liminal" at Khaas Art Gallery, Islamabad (2013)
- "Continuous/Present" at Rothas II, Lahore (2013)
- "Letters From An Underground Vein Road" at Koel Gallery, Karachi (2012)
- Indus Gallery, Karachi (1998)
- The Art Gallery, Islamabad (1997)
- NCA Gallery, Lahore (1995)
- Gallery Ardeco Avignon, Avignon (1995)

=== Group shows ===
- "Awaken Our Legacy" Standard Chartered Bank, WTC Branch, Karachi (2016)
- "Birwa" Showdown 2015, Sadequain Gallery, Karachi (2015)
- "Summer Scape 2014" Koel Gallery, Karachi (2014)
- "October Passage" Canakkale, Turkey (2013)
- "Summer Scape 2013" Koel Gallery, Karachi (2013)
- "Intimacy" Koel Gallery, Karachi (2013)
- "Abstract Art In Contemporary Russia" Moscow (2012)
- "Universal Sapience" Freiburg, Germany (2012)
- La Galleria Pall Mall, London, United Kingdom (2011)
- Takhti Project, Toronto, Canada (2002)
- Takhti Project, Sadequain Gallery, Karachi, Pakistan (2001)
- Alliance Françoise, Karachi, Pakistan (2000)
- Alliance Françoise, Karachi, Pakistan (1999)
- Zenini Gallery, Karachi, Pakistan (1998)
- Gallery Ardeco Avignon, France (1996)
- Gallery Sadequain, Karachi, Pakistan (1995)
- PNCA Gallery, Islamabad, Pakistan (1995)
- Shakir Ali Gallery, Lahore, Pakistan (1991)
- Shakir Ali Gallery, Lahore, Pakistan (1990)
- VM Gallery, Karachi, Pakistan (1989)

=== Biennales ===
- International Istanbul Biennial, Istanbul (2019)
- Karachi Biennale, Karachi (2017)
- Bodrum Biennial, Bodrum (2013)
- Izmir Biennale, Izmir (2011)

=== International public art festivals ===
- “Karachi Ki Khoj” [Redefining The Metropolis] IPAF, Karachi (2020)
- "Mostra Internazionale di Pittura" in Matera, Italy (2014)

=== Performance ===
- "Riwhyti” One Night Stand, Amin Gulgee Gallery, Karachi (2018)
- “Scroll”, Koel Gallery, Karachi (2012)

=== Artist residences ===
- "Recorded Time" at Koel Gallery (2017)
- "Hic-2" Workshop in Turgurtreis / Bodrum (2013)
- Winter Academy, Egypt, Fayoum (2011)
- International Painting Symposium, Egypt, Luxor (2010)
- Association Saint-Henri, France (1996)

== Publication ==
The Monograph Between Light was published on the occasion of Ayessha Quraishi's mid-career retrospective on 4 February 2020. It is a comprehensive volume on the work of the artist's prolific and continuing career spanning thirty-five years from 1985 to 2020.

It includes a curatorial essay by Zarmeene Shah and articles by Quddus Mirza, Maha Malik and Aasim Akhtar.
