= Tazeen Qayyum =

Pakistani-Canadian conceptual artist

- Qayyum in 2026
- Born: 1973 (age 52–53); Karachi, Pakistan
- Education: National College of Arts
- Occupation: Conceptual artist
- Spouse: Faisal Anwar

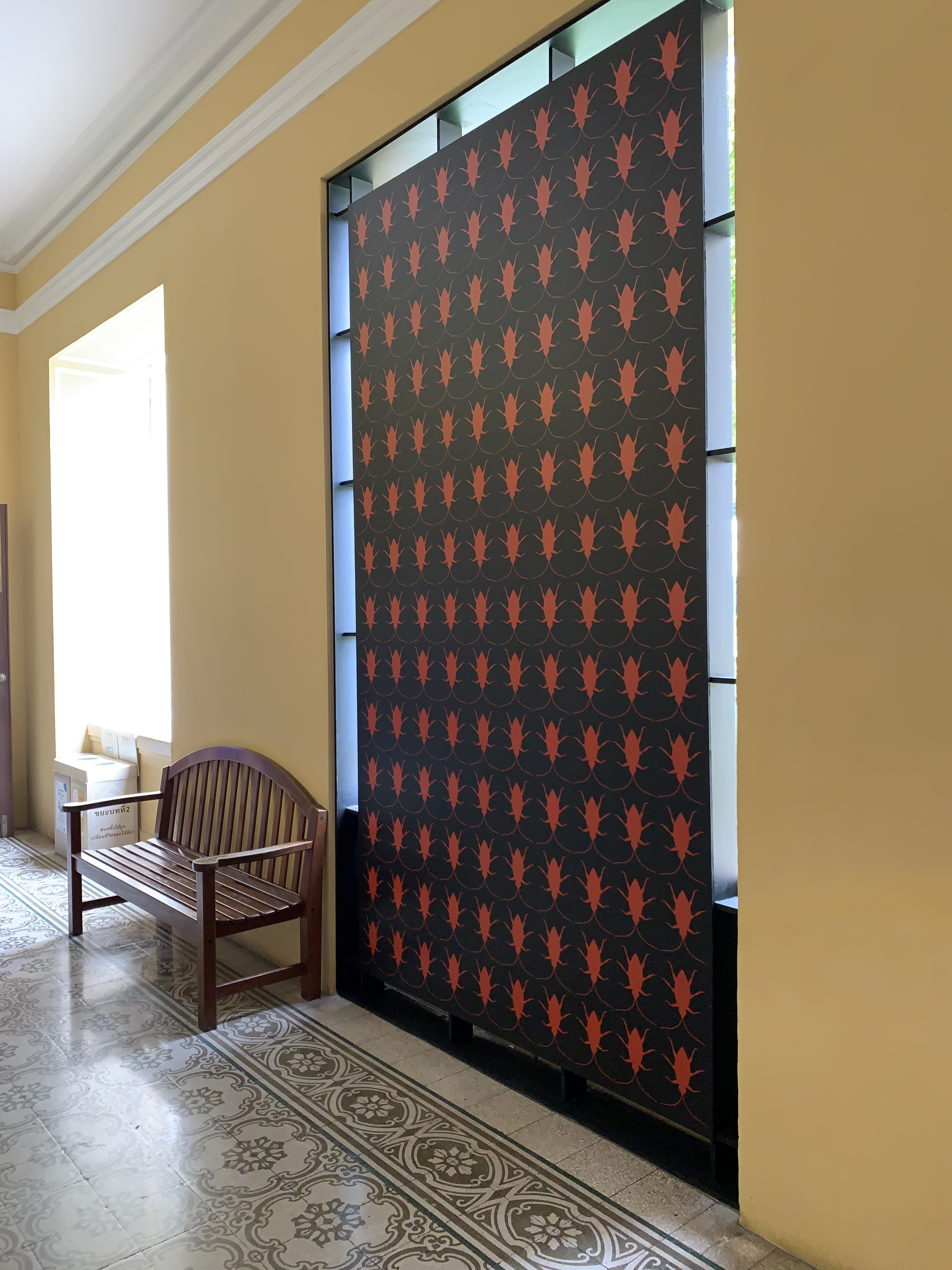
An artwork by Qayyum displayed at Museum Siam for Bangkok Art Biennale 2022, featuring her iconic cokroaches

Tazeen Qayyum is a Pakistani-born Canadian conceptual artist working in a variety of media including miniature painting, drawing, sculpture, performance, and video. Her work explores issues of identity, immigration, socio-political conflict, and her Muslim identity.

== Biography ==
Born in Karachi, Pakistan, in 1973, Tazeen Qayyum studied miniature painting at the National College of Arts in Lahore, Pakistan, graduating in 1996 with a BFA.

As a response to the 9/11 attacks, Qayyum began using the cockroach as a metaphor to connote the loss of life in the subsequent wars connected to the attacks, as well as fear and misunderstanding of other cultures. While the cockroach first appeared as part of her miniature painting practice, it would evolve into sculpture and installation work including A Holding Pattern, a multi-media piece that was installed at Toronto's Pearson International Airport in 2013.

Qayyum's more recent circular text pieces are performative based and originate from her work with installations of the repeated forms of cockroaches. Recurring singular phrases written in the Urdu (the artist's mother tongue) are drawn from the centre of the paper or canvas, concentrically moving out. These performances have been as long as twenty-four hours in duration. These drawing performances often result in joint pain.

Along with her artistic practice, Qayyum has offered workshops in miniature painting. She co-founded Offset Portfolio Centre in 1997, a gallery and resource centre for artists in Pakistan.

== Exhibitions ==
=== Solo exhibitions ===
Qayyum's work has been shown internationally in solo exhibitions including Miniature Paintings, Gallery Jutner, AIR Program, Vienna, Austria (2000), The Human Dichotomy, Aicon Contemporary (2008), A Holding Pattern at Toronto's Pearson International Airport (2013), (IN) Surge (NT) at the Canvas Gallery, Karachi (2015), Tazeen Qayyum: Descent at Canvas Gallery, Karachi (2018), and Sakoon at Zalucky Contemporary, Totonto (2022).

=== Group exhibitions ===
Qayyum's work has been shown in numerous group exhibitions. These include: Elusive Realities: recent works by Tazeen Qayyum and Sumaira Tazeen, Chawkandi Gallery, Karachi, Pakistan (2008) Art in Review: Farida Batool, Adeela Suleman and Tazeen Qayyum, Aicon Gallery (2009), Veiled: Andrew McPhail, Grace Ndiritu, Tazeen Qayyum, Textile Museum, Toronto (2012), and Beyond Measure: Domesticating Distance, The Robert McLaughlin Gallery, Oshawa, 2015 among others.

== Performances ==
Qayyum's drawing based performances include Unvoiced held at the 1st Karachi Biennale, Pakistan in 2017, and 'We do not know who we are where we go', which was part of the Mixer Project at The Royal Conservatory of Music, Toronto (2016). She has also directed performance work including Double Date in 2007 produced by SAVAC (South Asian Visual Arts Collective) at Lennox Contemporary Gallery, Toronto and AKA Gallery, Saskatoon, and A Feast in Exile held in 2009 and produced by VASL Artist's Collective.

== Personal life ==
Qayyum is married to digital media artist Faisal Anwar and lives in Oakville, Ontario.

== Bibliography ==
- Mitra, Srimoyee (2015). Border Cultures. Art Gallery of Windsor and Black Dog Publishing (Windsor, ON; London, UK). ISBN 978-1-910433-44-7
- Siddiqui, Ambereen (2015). Beyond Measure: Domesticating Distance. The Robert McLaughlin Gallery, (Oshawa, ON). ISBN 978-1-926589-88-6
- Akhter, Asim (2009). 'Artificial Paradise,’ Discretion is Advised. Gandhara-art, (Karachi, Pakistan).
- Sivanesan, Haema (2008). 'Stories for the Moment.' Urban Myths & Modern Fables. Doris McCarthy Gallery (Toronto, ON), SAVAC (Toronto, ON). ISBN 9780772754073
- Hashmi, Salima and Dalmia, Yashodhara (2007). Memory, Metaphor, Mutations, Contemporary Art of India and Pakistan. Oxford University Press (New Delhi, India). ISBN 0195673476
- Hashmi, Salima (2006). 'Spinning Stories, The Art of Pakistani Women Miniaturists,' A Thousand and One Days: Pakistani Women Artists. Honolulu Academy of Art (Honolulu, Hawaii). ISBN 978-0937426739
- Malik, Murtaza (2003). Unveiling the Visible: Lives and Works of Women Artists of Pakistan. Actionaid (Pakistan). ISBN 978-9693513615
