= National College of Arts =

Public university in Lahore, Pakistan

- Other name: NCA
- Former name: Mayo School of Arts
- Motto: کسب کمال کُن کہ عزیز جہان شوی; Kasb-e-kamal kun ke Aziz-e-Jahan shavi
- Motto in English: Seek excellence in your work, so you can be admired by the world
- Type: Public
- Established: 1875; 151 years ago
- Vice-Chancellor: Murtaza Jafri
- Location: Lahore, Punjab, Pakistan
- Website: nca.edu.pk

The National College of Arts (colloquially known as NCA) is a public university located in Lahore, Punjab, Pakistan.

== Overview ==
The National College of Arts – Federally Chartered Institute, is the oldest art school in Pakistan and the second oldest in the region. As of 2016, The college is ranked as Pakistan's top art school. It consists of over 700 students. The college runs faculty and student exchange programs with the School of Fine Arts, University of New South Wales, École nationale supérieure des Beaux-Arts and the Instituto Superior de Arte. It also hosts the UNESCO Chair in architecture.

== History ==
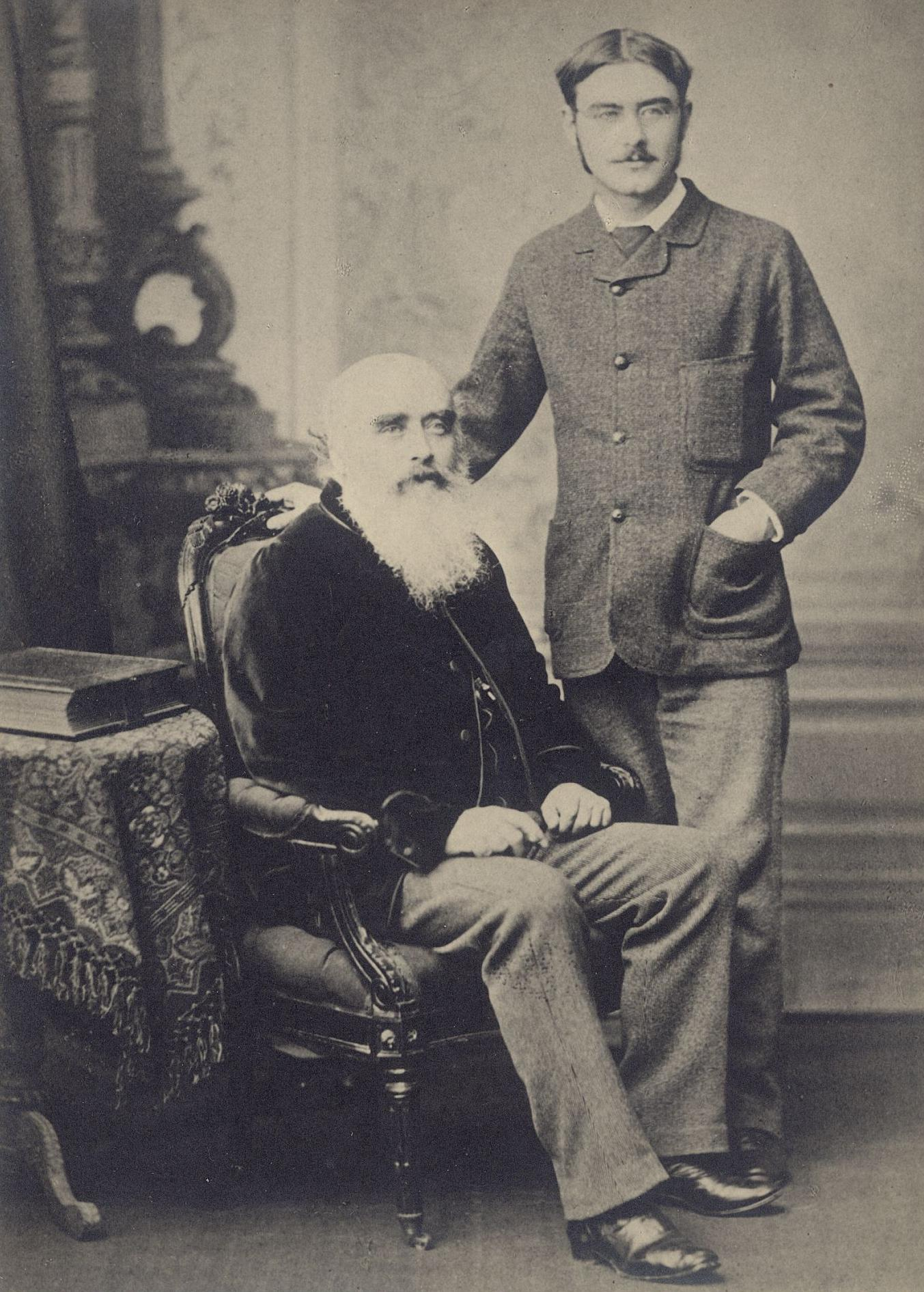
John Lockwood Kipling, first principal of the college with his son Rudyard Kipling.

The institute was originally founded in 1876 as the Mayo School of Industrial Arts and was one of the two art colleges created by the British crown in British India in reaction to the Arts & Crafts Movement. It was named in honor of the recently assassinated British Viceroy Lord Mayo in 1876. John Lockwood Kipling became the school's first principal and was also appointed as the first curator of the Lahore Museum which opened the same year in an adjacent building. Kipling served as principal from 1875 to 1890, followed by Fred Andrews (1890–1897), Percy Brown (1897–1909), Bhai Ram Singh (1909–1913), Hugh Lionel Heath (1913–1929), Sumarendra Nath Gupta (1929–1942) and Mian Mohammad Hussain (1942–1947). B. C. Sanyal served as vice-principal before 1947

In 1958, the school was renamed the National College of Arts and Mian Barkat Ali was appointed as principal. Designated the premier art institution in the country, it was transferred to the Ministry of Education from the Ministry Industries in the 1960s. It received degree-awarding status in 1985 and created its first graduate programs in 1999. In 2011, the college received its own charter and became a degree awarding institute (DAI).

== Undergraduate programmes ==
- Department of Fine Arts
- Department of Design
  - Visual Communication Design
  - Ceramics Design
  - Textile Design
  - Product Design
- Department of Film and Television
- Department of Architecture
- Department of Musicology
- Department of Cultural Studies
- Department of Multimedia Arts

== Graduate programmes ==
- Master of Visual Art
- Master of Interior Design
- Master of Multimedia Art
- Mphil in Cultural Studies

== Notable faculty ==
- Kamil Khan Mumtaz – Architect and heritage conservationist; served as Head of the Architecture Department (1966–1975) and pioneered the modern five-year architecture curriculum.
- Salima Hashmi – Artist, activist, and former professor and Principal of NCA.
- Zahoor ul Akhlaq – Pioneering modernist artist and professor; served as the Head of the Fine Arts Department until 1991. He spent over 25 years teaching at the college, revitalized the printmaking department, and laid the conceptual groundwork for the modern Contemporary Miniature Painting movement by mentoring global icons like Shahzia Sikander and Rashid Rana. The college's primary on-campus art space, the Zahoor ul Akhlaq Gallery, is named in his honor.
- Bashir Ahmed – Master miniature painter and recipient of the Pride of Performance; served as Head of the Fine Arts Department and later as Principal of NCA. In 1982, he established the world’s first formal bachelor's degree program for Miniature Painting at the college, creating its curriculum and mentoring global contemporary icons such as Shahzia Sikander and Imran Qureshi.

== Notable alumni ==
- Farooq Qaiser - Artist, columnist, TV director, puppeteer, script writer, and voice actor
- Nayyar Ali Dada – Architect and recipient of the Aga Khan Award for Architecture
- Imran Abbas - Model and actor
- Sumaira Tazeen - Artist
- Murtaza Jafri - Painter and sculptor
- Meesha Shafi - Singer, actor
- Salima Hashmi - Artist, activist and educator
- Shahzia Sikander - Artist
- Faisal Qureshi - Actor and humorist
- Ammar Aziz - Filmmaker and poet
- Anila Quayyum Agha - Artist
- Satish Gujral - Artist
- Ayesha Omar - Model and actress
- Affan Waheed - Artist and actor
- Bhai Ram Singh - Architect
- Wahaj Ali - Actor
- Talhah Yunus - Filmmaker and activist
- Asfar Hussain - Singer and song writer
- Bhagat Singh - Activist
- Rashid Rana - Artist
- Ali Zafar - Singer, actor
- Zeshan Khan - Filmmaker, Director

== Rawalpindi and Gilgit sub campuses ==
The college established its second campus in Rawalpindi in 2005.

In 2024, NCA opened its third campus in Gilgit with an associate degree program.
