= Postage stamps and postal history of Pakistan =

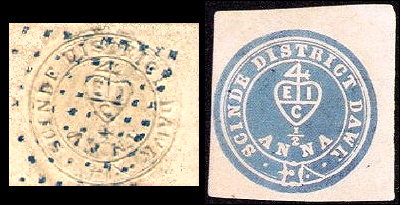
White and blue Scinde Dawks

Postage stamps of Pakistan are those issued since Pakistan's independence in 1947. Pakistan Post has issued more than 600 sets and singles totalling more than 1300 stamps. Immediately after the independence of Pakistan in 1947, the new Pakistan government was preoccupied with setting up the government so British Indian stamps continued in use without an overprint as was the practice in other countries.

The history of postage stamps in the region dates back to 1852, when Sir Bartle Frere of the British East India Company became the Chief Commissioner of Sind in 1851 and in 1852. Following the British example set by Rowland Hill, Frere improved upon the operations of the postal system of Sindh, introduced a cheap and uniform rate for postage (independent of distance travelled) and initiated the production of the Scinde Dawk stamps. These became the forerunners of the adhesive stamps to be used throughout India, Burma, the Straits Settlements and other areas controlled by the British East India Company. Their usage ceased with the introduction of official British Indian stamps in 1854.

== History ==
=== 1947 to 1971 ===
At the time of independence in August 1947, the country inherited a divided (east and west) postal system established by the British. The new system started operating under the modified Post Office Act no VI of 1898. The post office was part of the joint Department of Posts and Telegraph of the Ministry of Communications. Though the Office of the Postmaster General became operational at Lahore from 15 August 1947, the newly formed government was too preoccupied with establishing itself, therefore British Indian stamps continued to be used without an overprint as was the practice in other countries.

On 1 October 1947, the government released its first stamps, being from the 1940s British India series of King George VI stamps overprinted with the word Pakistan. Known as the Nasik Overprints, after the place near Mumbai, India, where they were overprinted, this set consists of 19 stamps. These Nasik overprints were also used in some Gulf states, both officially and unofficial. At the time of independence, the postal system of some of these areas was run from Karachi, and therefore, they became the responsibility of the new government. Officially these stamps were used in Muscat and Oman and its protectorate of Gwadar (on Pakistan's Baluchistan coast) and Dubai. Muscat used these stamps for a period of only 3 months from 29 December 1947 to 31 March 1948. Gwadar used this issue and various other commemorative ones until 1958. Dubai used these stamps from October 1947 until the end of March 1948.

In November 1947, Pakistan joined the Universal Postal Union as its 89th member. Nine months later on 9 July 1948, the government released its first commemorative set for the country's first anniversary which consisted of 4 stamps. The stamps were inscribed "15 August 1947" because of the prevailing confusing as to which date was Pakistan's actual date of independence. It was not until early 1949, that this confusion was cleared by declaring 14 August as independence day. The first day cancellation for this issue was the country's first special pictorial postmark.

14 August 1948 saw the released of the first definitive set consisting of 20 stamps. This set depicted scales of justice (3); crescent and star (3); Lloyd's Barrage (now Sukkur Barrage)(3); Karachi Port Trust building (5); Salimullah Hostel, Dacca University (now in Bangladesh)(3) and the Khyber Pass (3). These were withdrawn from sale on 1 January 1961.

The centenary of Scinde Dawks was commemorated in 1952 with the release of a set of two stamps. These depicted the actual stamps plus advances in transportation since their release.

The authorities have to date issued only four booklets, with the only regular issue, released in 1956. Released on 23 March 1956, the first booklet was also the only time a private company, in this case Atco Industries, makers of Alladin battery cells, had sponsored a booklet. It contained 24 stamps of two denominations, 6 pies and 1 ½anna, from the 7th anniversary set of 1954. Each pane was separated by interleaving of butter paper. The booklet was priced at Rs. 1/8 and 10,000 booklets were printed.

==== Currency change ====
In 1961, the government decided to introduce decimal currency into the country. This necessitated the surcharging of stamps to reflect this change. Six stamps were chosen from various issues and overprinted with the following denominations: 1 paisa, 2 paisas, 3 paisas, 7 paisas, 13 paisas (2 designs). Their printing was divided between two local printers, both based in Karachi: Pakistan Security Printing Corporation (PSPC) and Time Press, Karachi. Times Press used many plates for printing which resulted in varieties and shifts. Service stamps with decimal surcharges were also printed by the same printers. Forgeries in this issue exist in such numbers that they make the average person think that there are more errors and varieties than in fact. In the 2 paisas Service stamps, errors including service on front and surcharge on gum side are forgeries.

==== Independent Department ====
In July 1962, the government bifurcated the old department and independently placed the postal service under the Ministry of Communications.

To speed up the sorting of mail, during the 1960s, the post office installed five Thrisell Electro Magnetic Sorting Machines in Karachi and Lahore. However, during the 1980s their use was stopped.

=== 1972 to date ===
1972 was the beginning of a new period in the country's postal history, with the eastern wing of the country lost in the 1971 War, forming the new country of Bangladesh. However, the post office continued to use three languages on stamps until the end of the year.

From August 1986, a number of special services were introduced within the country. These included Air Express (Airex) (2 August 1986); Urgent Mail Service (UMS) (1 January 1987); local packet and parcel service or Local Express Delivery (LES) (22 April 1987); International Speed Post (ISP) (1 September 1986) and Postal Giro Service (15 March 1988)

In January 1988, 5-digit postcodes were introduce in the country to facilitate delivery.

On 14 August 1990, the government released its largest set on pioneers of freedom. Designed by Saeed Akhtar it was released in three sheets of nine stamps.

To improve and expedite the transmission and delivery of international mail, a new office was constructed in Islamabad which started working in December 1990. This helped to reduce pressure on the office in Karachi.

From 1991, Express Mail was sub contracted at Karachi.

==== Pakistan Postal Services Corporation ====
Between 1 August 1992 and 6 July 1996, the post office was separated from the Ministry and made an independent corporation. It was during this period that philately was first commercialised.

==== Pakistan Post ====
In 2001, the government raises basic inland postage rates from Rs. 2 to Rs. 4.

In 2002, Pakistan Postal Services Management Board was created.

==== Ministry of Postal Services ====
On 3 November 2008, the department was placed under the postal division of the newly created Ministry of Postal Services. Senator Israr Ullah Zehri was appointed its first minister.

The first stamp issued under the new ministry was released on 10 December 2008, to honour the awarding of UN Human Rights Award to Benazir Bhutto.

In November 2009, the government again raised minimum postage by 100% to Rs. 8. To improve services, the Post Office has implemented a plan to establish 100 express centres throughout the country by June 2010. These will includes centres at Hyderabad, Islamabad (1) Karachi, Lahore (6), Multan, Peshawar, Quetta, Rawalpindi (6) and Sukkur and provide a number of services under one roof.

== Postage Stamps ==
=== Nasik Overprints ===
On 1 October 1947, the government released its first stamps, being from the 1940s British India series of King George VI stamps overprinted with the word Pakistan. Known as the Nasik Overprints, after the place near Mumbai, India, where they were overprinted, this set consists of 19 stamps.

=== Definitives ===
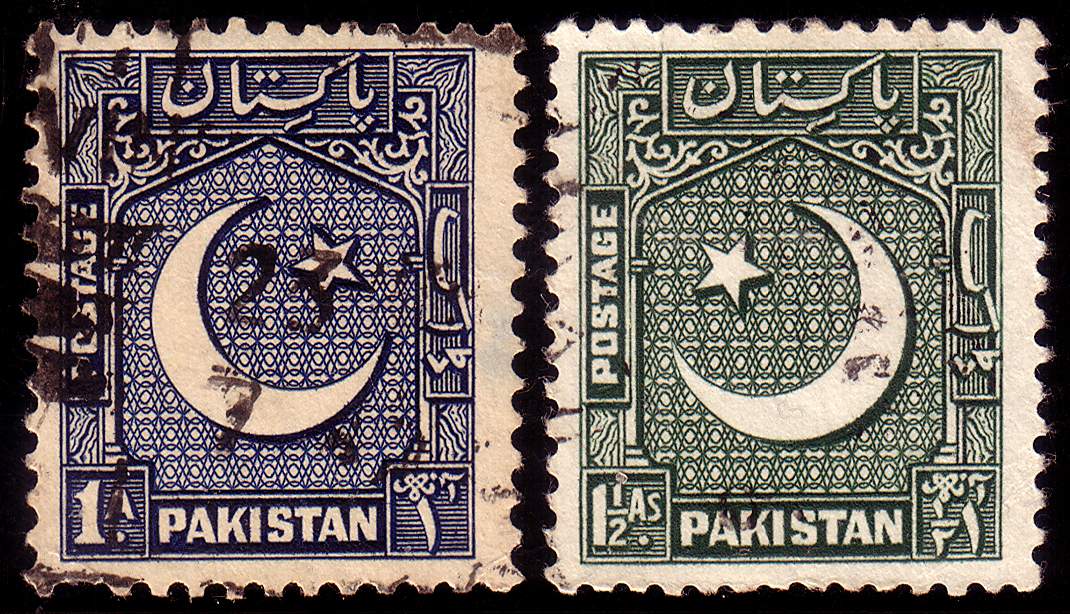
Two 1948–1952 stamps of Pakistan

Over the last 60 years, 17 definitive or regular series have been issued. The first series was issued on 14 August 1948 and consisted of 20 stamps. These stamps featured scales of justice (3); crescent and star (3); Lloyd's Barrage (now Sukkur barrage)(3); Karachi Port Trust building (5); Salimullah Hostel, Dacca University (3) and the Khyber Pass (3). Mian Mahmood Alam Suharwardy gave 2 designs for this set: scale of justice and star and crescent. These along with the 1949 redrawn series, were withdrawn from sale on 1 January 1961.

The 1951, 1954, 1955 and 1956 Independence Anniversary issues were all basically definitive series. During this time, these stamps featured the Badshahi Mosque and Jahangir's Tomb in Lahore; the Kaghan Valley and the mountains around Gilgit; tea gardens, jute fields and Karnaphuli Paper Mill in East Pakistan (now Bangladesh) and a textile mill, cotton fields and a Sui Gas Plant in West Pakistan.

The 1957, 1958 and 1960 Republic Day (23 March) issues were also definitives. Since then 10 further series have been issued, with the latest in 1998. The 1978 series was printed with both gum Arabic and PVA gum, though the PVA issue had only 17 stamps compared to 18 for gum Arabic. These stamps featured the Minar-e-Pakistan (3); tractors (9 Gum Arabic, 8 Gum PVA) and Makli tombs (6). Of the last four series, three in 1989, 1994 and 1998, feature different portraits of the Quaid. The fourth in 1995 featured a geometric design.

=== First commemorative issue ===
The first commemorative issue was released in July 1948 for the country's first anniversary. Three of the four stamps depicted places from West Pakistan while the fourth stamp depicted a motif. The places were: Constituent Assembly Building, Karachi (1 ½ annas), Karachi airport (2 ½ annas) and Lahore Fort (3 annas). The stamps were inscribed "15th August 1947" because of the prevailing confusing as to which date was Pakistan's actual date of independence. It was not until early 1949, that this confusion was cleared by declaring 14 August as independence day. The artist, A.R. Chughtai was also amongst Pakistan's first stamp designers having designed the Re 1 motif stamp. The other stamps were designed by Rashiduddin (1 ½ anna and 3 anna) and M. Latif 2 ½ anna). This set was printed in London by Thomas De La Rue Company as the country did not have its own printing press.

=== Decimal Surcharges ===
In 1961, the government decided to introduce decimal coinage into the country. This necessitated the surcharging of stamps to reflect this change. Six stamps were chosen from various issues as follows:

- 1 paisa on 1 ½ anna stamp from the 7th Anniversary of independence set released on 14 August 1954. It depicted Jahangir's Tomb in Lahore.
- 2 paisas on 3 pie stamp from the first regular series crescent and star facing north east released on 14 August 1948. Scales of Justice were depicted on this stamp.
- 3 paisas on 6 pies stamp from the Jammu and Kashmir definitive set released on 23 March 1960. Stamp depicted a map of Pakistan.
- 7 paisas on 1 anna stamp\ from the 7th Anniversary of independence set released on 14 August 1954. The Badshahi Mosque, Lahore stamp was chosen from this series.
- 13 paisas on 2 anna stamp from the 9th Anniversary of independence set released on 14 August 1956. Stamp showed a crescent and star.
- 13 paisas on 2 anna stamp from the Jammu and Kashmir definitive set released on 23 March 1960. Stamp depicted a map of Pakistan with Jammu and Kashmir's status as not yet determined.

The printing of these stamps was divided between two printers: Pakistan Security Printing Corporation (PSPC) and Time Press, Karachi. The former printed the 2 paisa, 3 paisa and 13 paisa stamps while the later did the 1 paisa, 7 paisa and 13 paisa stamps.

In the printing the Times Press used as many as 34 plates; 17 for 1 paisa (ordinary and service), 14 for 7 paisas and 3 plates for 13 paisas. The PSPC used single plates for each denomination, therefore resulting in only minor varieties and shifts.

Service stamps with decimal surcharges were also printed by the same printers. However, these are scarcer than ordinary stamps.

Forgeries in this issue exist in such numbers that they make the average person think that there are more errors and varieties than in fact. In the 2 paisas Service stamps, errors including service on front and surcharge on gum side are forgeries.

In the 3 paisa and 13 paisa stamps, spelling errors such as "3PASIA" or 13 "PAIS" which are even listed in Stanley Gibbons are forgeries. In the 7 paisa there are a number of known forgeries including extra sharp letters with the 'S' slightly broader. The 13 paisa is one issue in which the existence of forgeries is very difficult because of the existence of variable stages of wear.

=== Themes and series ===
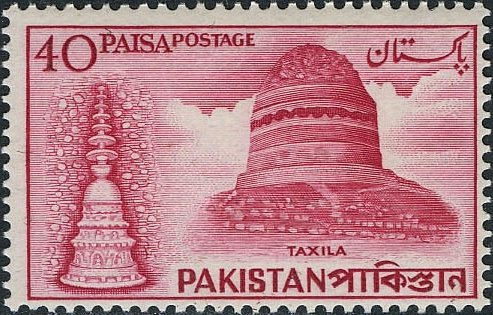
A stupa in Taxila depicted on stamp

Over the years, the postal authorities have portrayed, commemorated and honoured various personalities, national and international organisations and events, the country's flora and fauna, its cultural and historical heritage as well as the country's development. Other themes include health, educational institutions, religion, sports and defence.

Though it has now become very common to portray a human face on stamps, for the initial 17 years this was not the case. Mr. M. H. Zuberi, a retired CSP officer, tried to get the president's approval to issue stamps with the Quaid's portrait in 1964. This was however, rejected on the grounds that the people might not accept them. He however, persevered and it paid off when the first locally designed issue to carry a human face, a set of three stamps, was released to pay homage to the country's armed forces after the War of 1965. The first incumbent head of state or government portrayed was General Ayub Khan on the 1966 stamps for the new capital of Islamabad.

The Quaid was first pictured on his 90th birth anniversary in 1966. Earlier issues carried motifs and wordings or his mausoleum. Since then numerous stamps have been issued carrying his portrait including his 50 death anniversary in 1998 and 125 years of his birth in 2001.

Since the 1960s, the government has featured a large number of both local and foreign personalities including Allama Mohammad Iqbal, Mirza Ghalib, Kemal Atatürk, Shah of Iran, Maria Montessori, Hakim Saeed, Liaquat Ali Khan, Nusrat Fateh Ali Khan, Tipu Sultan and Abdus Salam. The largest set ever issued consisted of 27 stamps and depicted pioneers of Pakistan's freedom movement (1990). For a complete list of personalities on Pakistani stamps, please see this list.

Over the years, various series have been periodically issued. There is no set basis for their issuance and these are released at the discretion of the authorities. Current series include Men of Letters and Medicinal Plants of Pakistan. Other series have included Fruits of Pakistan, Handicrafts, Moenjodaro, Poets of Pakistan and Wildlife.

=== Gold stamp ===
In 1976, the authorities issued a gold stamp for the birth centenary of Mohammad Ali Jinnah. Each stamp carried 25 mg of 23/24 carat gold and was valued at Rs. 10. These stamps were printed by Cartor S.A., France using a special silk screen printing process known as serigraphy. It was the first time that this process was used to make a stamp. A sheetlet with stamp impression and a description of the event at the bottom was also released. The 500 copies printed were distributed to guests and dignitaries.

=== Errors, Varieties, Forgeries and Overprints ===
There were two famous "errors" during the 1960s. The 1961 definitive was initially released with the name of the country wrongly spelt in Bengali i.e. "Shakistan" instead of Pakistan. The error was corrected and new stamps released. In 1968, the government printed stamps commemorating the Bengali poet Kazi Nazrul Islam. However, the birth year was out by a hundred years: 1989 instead of 1889. Although these stamps were not issued, a few of them did find their way into the market.

Forgeries exist in the decimal surcharge stamps of 1961.

For the 10th Anniversary of the United Nations, Pakistan Post overprinted two stamps, one each from the 7th (1 ½ anna) and 8th (12 anna) Anniversary issues, with the words, Tenth Anniversary United Nations 24.10.55 in blue.

Varieties of different kinds exist in many different issues. Watermark variations are common. For example, in the 1994, definitive series, inverted watermark (Rs. 5, Rs. 10, Rs. 12 and Rs. 15) and watermark sideways (Rs. 10, Rs. 15 and Rs. 20) are known.

=== Withdrawn and Not released Issues ===
In 1976, the post offices designed a stamps to coincide with the opening of the Shah Faisal Mosque in Islamabad. However this issue was not officially released but did manage to find its way onto the market.

In 2007, it issued and later withdrew a stamp to commemorate the 1st Anniversary of the 3rd meeting of the ECO Postal Authorities held in Turkey. The stamp was withdrawn because the name of the country had not been printed on it.

=== Joint issues ===
Twice during the 1960s and then yearly in the 1970s, Pakistan released joint issues with Turkey and Iran to commemorate the Regional Cooperation for Development (RCD). The stamps depicted various aspects from the three nations including paintings, landscapes, personalities, handicrafts and mosques. Between 1977 and 1994, the country released 5 joint issues with Indonesia for the Indonesia Pakistan Economic and Cultural Cooperation (IPECC) Organisation. In 1995, it issued a stamp with Turkey for the holding of the conference of women parliamentarians. And in 1997, Jalal al din Rumi and Allama Muhammad Iqbal were honoured with Iran.

On the political front, in 2002 it teamed up with Kyrgyzstan to release a stamp on the 10th anniversary of diplomatic relations between the two countries, and in 2004, Eurasia Postal Union (2001) members: Azerbaijan, The Turkish Republic of Northern Cyprus, Pakistan and Turkey jointly issued stamps on the Silk Route.

=== Souvenir sheets ===
The first souvenir sheet was issued for Universal Postal Union Day on 9 October 1971. It was an imperforate sheet valued at 70p. There were no leaflets or first day covers released and 10,000 sheets were printed.

Over the years, other sheets have been released and include both perforated and imperforate sheets. These include the 2,500th anniversary of the Iranian Monarchy (1971), the Quaid's 50th death anniversary (1998) and the 50th anniversary of the first ascent of K-2 (2004).

In 2005, Pakistan Post issued a souvenir sheet to raise money for the 2005 earthquake victims. There were 8 stamps of Rs. 4, though the sheet was valued at Rs. 100. The entire amount was meant for the President's Fund. However, the souvenir sheet was also valid for postage but for Rs. 32 only. This sheet has not been given a number by the post office but catalogues list it as an issue. A similar issue was released in 2009 for raising funds for the prime minister's relief fund for Swat refugees. Like 2005, this issue was also sold for Rs. 100/- but it contained postage stamps worth Rs. 40/- only.

2008 saw the release of three souvenir sheets: the first on 29th martyrdom anniversary of Zulfikar Ali Bhutto in April with the slain leader's daughter, Benazir Bhutto, who was assassination in December 2007. The second on the birthday celebrations of Benazir Bhutto and the third on her death anniversary.

Pakistan Post on November 9, 2024, released a commemorative souvenir sheet honoring the esteemed Dr. Javid Iqbal. This special issue was remarkable not only because it celebrated Dr.Javid Iqbal's legacy but also because it was the first time Pakistan Post incorporated a QR code into a souvenir sheet. The innovative design of the souvenir sheet was the brainchild of two talented designers: Abu Obaidah Ayyaz and Hasnain Mahmud. Their creative collaboration resulted in a unique and memorable philatelic tribute to Dr. Javid Iqbal.

In a groundbreaking move, Pakistan Post Office unveiled a distinctive triangle-shaped souvenir sheet on International Mountain Day (December 11, 2024). This innovative design, a first of its kind in Pakistan, was masterfully crafted by the talented duo of (Abu Obaidah Ayyaz and Abdullah Shams) Notably, this made Abdullah Shams the youngest Pakistani designer to design a souvenir sheet for Pakistan Post Office.

=== Booklets ===
Pakistan has to date issued only four booklets, the only regular issue, was released in 1956. The other three were issued for stamp exhibitions in the 1990s. Released on 23 March 1956, the first booklet was also the only time a private company, in this case Atco Industries, makers of Alladin battery cells, had sponsored a booklet. It contained 24 stamps of two denominations, 6 pies and 1 ½anna, from the 7th anniversary set of 1954. Each pane was separated by interleaving of butter paper. The booklet was priced at Rs. 1/8. 10,000 booklets were printed.

The second booklet, with a released quantity of between 500 and 600, was only sold during the National Seminar on Philately held in Multan in 1992. It consisted of 2 denominations from the Mohammad Ali Jinnah 1989 definitive series overprinted in light grey with "National Seminar on Philately Multan 1992". Watermarked paper was used and it was printed using lithography for the frames and recess for the centre. PVA gum was used with perforation at 13C. The price was Rs. 20 even though the stamps were valued at only Rs. 18.

The third booklet, for a stamp exhibition in Peshawar, was released in a quantity of 8,500. It was sold through the philatelic bureau across the country. This exhibition was organised by the Peshawar Stamp Society. Released on 20 January 1993, three values from the forts definitive issue were used and 18 stamps each were printed. The price was Rs. 30, Rs. 3 more than the value inside. There was no watermark and perforation was 11C. Both PVA and Gum Arabica were used.

The fourth and last booklet was released on 1 February 1994. It used the Re.1 stamp depicting Wazir Mansion, the birthplace of Mohammad Ali Jinnah. Though 10,000 booklets were printed, because of defects many were return and therefore the actual numbers sold is considerably lower.

=== Languages ===
When stamps were initially issued, the name of the country was in two languages i.e. English and Urdu. Bengali, which was the first language for more than half the population, was not depicted on stamps until 1956. The first set aptly commemorated the first session of the National Assembly in the eastern wing. From then until 1973 when Pakistan officially recognised Bangladesh, three languages were depicted on the country's stamps. After 1973, it reverted to using Urdu and English again.

=== First Day Covers ===
Though Pakistan started issuing first day postmarks with its first stamps, this was not the case with covers. Earlier, collectors made their own covers and took them to the post office to be stamped. This however, changed in 1961 when official ones were released. Before, that only one official FDC was released on the occasion of the centenary of the Scinde Dawk issue.

=== Annual and special folders ===
Earlier, annual folders containing the entire year's issues were prepared and sold throughout the country to promote philately. However, in recent times this practise has been discontinued.

In 1989, Pakistan Post issued a special folder during INDIA89. It consisted of a single sheet of 5 stamp designs from the Los Angeles Olympics. The cover depicted the Post's logo and the inscription, "Olympics Los Angeles Commemorative Postage Stamps." A quantity of 250 folders were sold at their face value of Rs. 150. These were later traded at Rs. 2000/-.

== Printing ==
Three 1948 Pakistani stamps showing the Khyber Pass

=== Designers and stamp design ===
Three people, A.R. chughtai, Rashiduddin and Muhammad Latif, have the honour of designing the first commemorative set issued in July 1948. Since then, numerous other people have designed stamps for the country, including some well-known artists. These artists include Saeed Akhtar, Bashir Mirza, Askari Mian Irani, Jimmy Engineer and Zahoor ul Akhlaq. Others designers were Nighat Saeed, Saleem Uddin Ghori, Zahid Shah, Talat Sultana and A. J. McCoy. A famous Pakistani designer is Adil Salahuddin, who in his capacity as the official designer for almost 40 years, designed over 350 stamps for his country.

Most of the stamps designed are by local designers. However, photographs have been also used for stamps as in the Louis Pasteur issue (1995) and the 1993, Siberian Crane issue. Some organisations linked to a stamp issue, supply their own design. These have included the Family Planning Association of Pakistan, Kinnaird College for Women, Lahore, Muslim Commercial Bank and UNICEF Pakistan. For the 1987 Air Force Day set, a painting by Sq. Ldr Masood was used to design the final stamps. Faiz Ahmed Faiz's stamp in 1997 was designed using a photograph.

On 23 July 2024, Pakistan issued its first AI assisted stamps designed by Abu Obaidah Ayyaz and Hasnain Mahmud. The issue made Pakistan only the second country in Asia to issue AI assisted stamps after the UAE. Abu Obaidah Ayyaz is also the youngest Pakistani postage stamps designer.

=== Gum and paper ===
From 1968 until about 2003 paper manufactured at Pakistan Security Printing Press, Karachi was used to print the stamps. The ink used was also manufactured at the same place. Near the end of the 2003, paper manufactured by Tullis Russell Coaters, UK started being used, and it continued for the next year. At the beginning of 2005, paper imported from Shanghai Kailum Paper (Group) Co Ltd, China was used until mid-2006 except for a couple of issues. Since then paper manufactured at the Security Press, Karachi is used.

=== Process ===
Pakistan Security Printing Press uses three processes in the production of stamps. These are: recess, photogravure and lithography. Definitive stamps of high and medium face values are printed using the recess method as are special stamps. However, a time frame of 10 to 12 months has to be given for its production. Special stamps which involve a large variety of colours are printed using the photogravure method. Simpler designed stamps, both commemorative and definitive are printed using lithography.

=== Watermarks ===
Watermarked paper was first used in the 1963 definitive issue for the Chota Sona Masjid. The watermark consisted of a crescent and star. Since 1993, it has also been occasionally used for commemorative issues. Besides normal watermarks, reversed, inverted and reversed inverted watermarks are also found on stamps.

=== Printing press ===
Due to the lack of a local press, Pakistan's initial stamps were printed by Thomas De La Rue in London. In 1949, the Pakistan Security Printing Corporation was set up in Malir Halt, Karachi. The first set printed entirely by this press was the 1954 Seventh Anniversary issue. Since then until mid-2003, it printed most of the stamps issued within the country. In 2003, from the Year of Mohtarma Fatima Jinnah issue, stamps were printed by Pakistan Post Office Foundation Press (Security Division), Karachi. However, this changeover did not last long and in 2006 the printing was reverted to the earlier printer. Other foreign printers of Pakistani stamps have been Cartor, Paris, France; Courvoisier, Switzerland; Harrisons, London and Secura, Singapore.

== Postmarks ==
=== First Day Cancellation ===
Though there was a postmark which marked the release of the Nasik Overprints (1947), the first special (pictorial) postmark of Pakistan was the one issued on 9 July 1948. The design was simple with a star above a crescent within a circle and Pakistan written in both Urdu and English. As time has gone by, these postmarks have become more and more elaborate.

=== Slogan postmarks ===
The first slogan postmark commemorated the founding of the country. The wordings were simple with "Pakistan Zindabad" in English and Urdu. Some of the examples of this type are from up to five years after independence. The initial slogans reflect the priories of the government with "Learn and Teach" in Urdu, the bilingual slogan with "Patronise Pakistan Products" (English) and "Use Pakistani products" (Urdu), and "Contribute to Quaid-e-Azam Memorial Fund." Later slogans depict a wide range of subjects including fighting TB (1963), census (1961) national identity cards (1973) and family planning (1980). Postmarks were issued in three languages: Bengali, Urdu and English, though all postmarks were not released in all three languages.

=== Special postmarks ===
Though slightly on the decline, special postmarks are also used. Over the years, these have commemorated events such as state visits by King Saud of Saudi Arabia (1954) and Elizabeth II (1961), stamp exhibitions (1968, 1998, 2003, 2008, 2009, 2010), the holding of cricket matches (2004) and National Horse and Cattle shows (1964, 1965). Others include Mother and Child Care Campaign (1961), Scouting (1953), SEATO Conference (1956), awarding of Hilal-e-Istiqlal to the cities of Sargodha, Lahore and Sialkot (1965) and World Post Day (2009).

=== Metermarks ===
Provided to bulk mailers, metermarks have become more prominent in recent years, most of which come with a slogan promoting the entity. Their usage is not restricted to any particular type of entity and include diplomatic missions, multinational corporations, book publishers, media groups, clubs, banks, government organisations and non-governmental organisations.

== Postal stationery ==
Besides stamps and souvenir sheets, the Post Office also prints postal stationery. These include pre-stamped envelopes, aerogrammes, postal cards, urgent mail service envelopes and registered envelopes.

=== Pre-stamped envelopes ===
Prestamped envelope depicts Bab-e-Khyber (2010)

These types of envelopes are mostly used for domestic postage. Until 1978, a simple design and size introduced by the British in the 1890s, was used. In 2001, new larger, 4-colour litho offset envelopes were issued. These provided both, the Post Office and commercial companies, an avenue for advertising. The first envelope was issued on 1 August 2001 and featured the Quaid's Ziarat Residency as the stamp impression. The reverse showed the Mazar-e-Quaid, Badshahi Mosque, Shah Faisal Mosque and the Northern Areas. It also gave the tourism department's website and the slogan "Visit Pakistan."

Later that year, three envelopes featuring Habib Bank AG Zurich were released with an additional one in April 2002. On all, the stamp impression was the bank's logo with an enlarged emblem on the left side. However, the writing above this emblem was different on each envelope including Pachas key lakh (a 100,000 from 50) and "A tradition of service" on one and small symbols to highlight the bank's services on another.

A month later, another bank, this time Muslim Commercial Bank (MCB), had five envelopes printed with the Quaid's Ziarat residency as their stamp impression. These envelopes also promoted the services of the bank including its rupee travellers cheques and 24‑hour banking via ATMs.

An error was noticed in the next envelope issued in June 2002. This envelope was smaller in size (200mm × 92mm) and also featured four landmarks of the country, but the name of the fort in Lahore was given as "Red Fort." This error was corrected quickly and new envelopes with the correct text were released in July. This reduction in size was not to last, for in October 2002, it was enlarged to 222mm × 96mm with the released of an envelope showing the national flag on top of buildings. A rarity exists in this envelope with the flags closed as opposed to unfurled later on.

Besides, the two banks in 2001, two oil companies: Pakistan State Oil (PSO) and Pak Arab Refinery Company (PARCO), have also had envelopes released with their advertisements. The housing scheme, Bahria Town, has also advertised on these envelopes in 2005. Since then, other designs include Sir Syed Ahmed Khan, Mohtarma Fatima Jinnah year (2003), 50th anniversary of the first ascent of K-2 (2004) and reconstruction of earthquake ravaged areas (2005). Normally, these envelopes are provided at the cost of postage, however, some such as the Golden Jubilee of Pakistan Resolution envelope (1990) carry additional stationery charges of 25 paisas.

=== Post Office Service Envelopes ===
In recent years special envelopes have been printed for some of the Post Office's various services. These include a Rs. 12 light blue envelope for Urgent Mail Service and a yellow Rs. 25 Airex envelope. The latter features, some of the country's famous landmarks. Both envelopes carry a stationery charge of Re. 1.

=== Aerogrammes/Air Letters ===
Pakistan had issued five different types of aerogrammes and air letters. These are for: public use, official use, armed forces/army use, prisoners of war and formulae aerogrammes. The first Pakistani air letter was a Nasik "Pakistan" overprint of a 6 anna British India, King George VI 1946 issue. Since then, these have been issued in various shapes and keeping up with increasing postal rates. The languages used on them are Bengali, Urdu and English. The late 1960s saw the introduction of pictorial aerogrammes. The front sides of these were printed with a view of Moenjodaro (Rs. 2) and a gate of Lahore Fort (Rs. 0.50).

The 1971 war saw the release of two special aerogrammes. The first one released for general use depicted a hand behind a barbwire to symbolise the POWs being held in India. The second one was released with reduced rates to be used for sending mail to the POWs. In 1982, two special aerogrammes were released. They were overprints in gold on the Rs. 2 ones, and issued to commemorate the International Stamp Exhibition, Philexfrance and Intentional Stamp Fair, Riccione, Italy. In 1990, to commemorate the golden jubilee of the Pakistan Resolution passed in Lahore (1940), the Post Office used a special aerogramme depicting Quaid-e-Azam, Mohammad Ali Jinnah.

Three aerogrammes were released to be used for the armed forces. Two were identical except for the watermark. The same message "for use by the armed forces" in Urdu was slightly larger in one.

=== Postal cards ===
1961 Pakistan postal stationery postcard with a pre-printed 5 piasa stamp

The first pictorial postal cards were released on 10 August 1967. Featuring four designs showing Buddha, a small industry, a boat scene from East Pakistan (now Bangladesh) and a dam in West Pakistan. These 30 paisa cards had a flying dove silhouette. About 8 months later in May 1967, a second set of 4 cards was released. In 2001, the Post Office teamed up with the organisers of the SAF Games, which were scheduled for that year in Islamabad, to produce Rs. 10 postcards. Besides being valid for postage, these cards entitled the buyer to be entered into a lucky draw. In 2009, the government reissued the current Re 1 Lahore Fort postcard with a Re. 1 postal stationery charge.

== Collecting Pakistani stamps ==
In Pakistan, stamp programmes are not issued in advance. Earlier, collectors could almost always count on stamps being issued on at least two dates: 23 March and 14 August. However, in recent years, 23 March issues have become less frequent. The number of stamps issue per year also varies. However, no matter how many issues are released, their total cost rarely exceeds Rs. 300/- (approx US$5). Besides postage stamps and souvenir sheets, the post office also sells first day covers, leaflets with and without stamps on it and postal stationery. Earlier, the post office did not use any specific numbering system but this changed when they started using a rather simple system on their leaflets: xxxx – y where xxxx is the year and y is the issue number within that year. All major catalogues include Pakistani stamps in them. Two local updated catalogues are available, each of which uses its own system of numbering.

== Chronology of Pakistani stamps ==
- 1947 – First official stamps
- 1948 – First commemorative stamps
- 1955 – First two colour stamp
- 1955 – First overprinted stamps
- 1956 – First trilingual issue
- 1962 – First airmail
- 1965 – First human face portrayed
- 1990 – Largest set issued – Pioneers of Freedom

== Philatelic societies ==
Within Pakistan:

- Thematic Society of Pakistan, Karachi
- Allama Iqbal Stamps Society, Lahore
- Philatelic Federation of Pakistan, Karachi
- Faisalabad Philatelic Association
- Scouts Stamps Society of Pakistan
- Peshawar Stamp Society
- Stamp Society of Pakistan, Karachi

Outside Pakistan:

- Pakistan Study Circle, UK

== See also ==
- List of people on stamps of Pakistan
- List of Pakistani stamp issues
- Postage stamps and postal history of India
- Postage stamps and postal history of Bangladesh
- Revenue stamps of Pakistan
