= German post offices in China =

The German Post Offices Abroad were a network of post offices in foreign countries established by Germany to provide mail service where the local services were deemed unsafe or unreliable. They were generally set up in cities with some sort of German commercial interest. In the earliest period when such offices were open, stamps used there can only be identified by their cancellations. Such stamps are known as "Vorläufer" (forerunner) stamps. Later stamps issued for use at a post office abroad can generally be identified by overprints even when not postally used. Germany began issuing distinctive stamps for use overseas beginning in the late 19th century, and the number and variety of issues reached its heyday at the beginning of the 20th century. All German Post Offices Abroad were closed down during or shortly after World War I.

It was not unusual for countries to maintain such offices and Austria-Hungary, China, France, Greece, Italy, Japan, Poland, Romania, Russia, the United Kingdom and the United States all did so. In the latter part of the 19th century and into the 20th century, having extraterritorial post offices was one indication of a nation's international power.

Stamps from German post offices abroad are popular with collectors and some are quite valuable. In a 2006 auction, a 40 Pfennig Germania hand-stamped "China" (Tientsin issue) stamp from 1900 realized 100,152 Euros.

== History ==
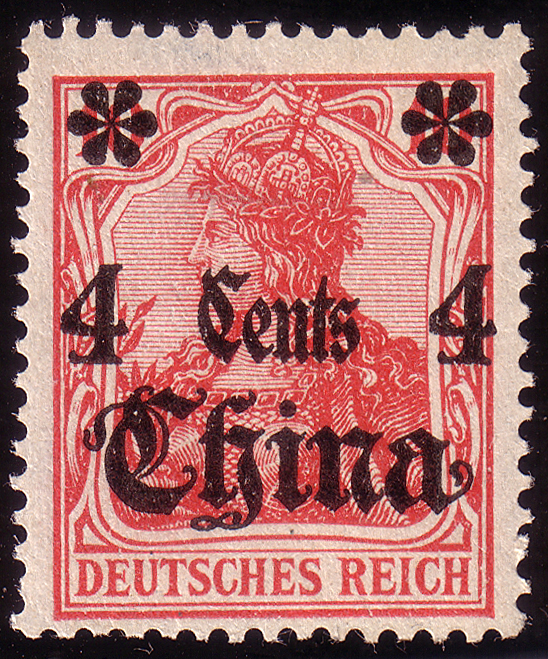
China, 1905 issue

German post offices in China (German: Deutsche Post in China) started to operate in 1886. Initially definitive stamps were used without overprint; such a stamp used in China is only recognizable by its cancellation. In 1898 stamps were issued with a diagonal overprint reading "China". From 1900 onwards, stamps of the Germania definitive series were issued with new style of horizontal "China" overprint. After 1905, a third "Gothic" style of "China" overprint was applied to Germania stamps which also obliterated the stamps' face value as stated in German mark and pfennig values, and replaced them with equivalent face values in Chinese dollars and cents. All German post offices in China closed after China declared war on Germany on 16 March 1917 if they were still operating on that date. Some had closed prior to this.

=== Post offices opening year ===
Post offices operated in these towns from the listed dates:

1886

- Schanghai (Spelled "Shanghai" in pre-1906 cancels)

1893

- Tientsin

1900

- Tschifu
- Futschau
- Hankau—located in what is now the city of Wuhan
- Itschang—post office in operation until September 1908
- Peking
- Tongku—post office in operation until April 1906

1901

- Shanhaikwan—post office in operation until October 1902
- Tschinkiang
- Tschinwangtau—post office in operation until March 1906

1902

- Amoy

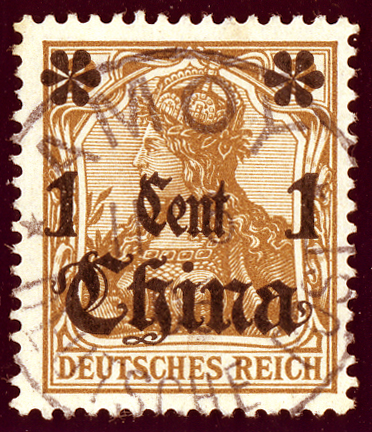
1 cent (issue 1906) cancelled AMOY DEUTSCHE POST

- Kanton (spelled "Canton" in pre-1913 cancels)
- Weihsien—post office in operation until September 1914

1903

- Nanking
- Tschingtschoufu—post office in operation until December 1905
- Tschonsun—post office in operation until January 1904

1904

- Swatau
- Tsinanfu

=== During the Boxer rebellion ===
In addition, during the Boxer Rebellion (1900–01) ten military mail offices were maintained. Disruptions in stamp supplies and postal operations caused by fighting at this time led to unoverprinted German stamps and stamps from the German colony of Kiautschou being used at these military offices as well as at the German post offices open to civilians. Such uses occurred primarily, but not exclusively, at Peking, Tientsin, and Shanghai. The unoverprinted German and Kiautschou stamps used at any of these offices are referred to collectively as "Petschili" issues.

== Kiautschou territory ==
Stamps printed for use in the German post offices in China but with a bilingual cancel reading "TSINGTAU-KIAUTSCHOU" or "TSINTAU CHINA" in the period 1898-1901 are actually forerunners of Kiautschou Pachtgebiet, which did not issue distinctive stamps of its own until early 1901.

== See also ==
- German post offices abroad
- German post offices in Morocco
- German post offices in the Ottoman Empire
- German post offices in Zanzibar
- List of postal services abroad
