= Marjorie Husain =

Pakistani artist and critic

- Occupations: Artist, art critic, writer
- Years active: 1960–2019
- Notable work: Aspects of art: Textbook for the Students of Art
- Spouse: Hamid Husain

Marjorie Husain is a British artist, art critic and writer who lived in Pakistan between the 1960s and 2019. Within the country, she was a prominent figure of the art community as well as being a founding member of its first art gallery. She worked to promote Pakistani art on both the national and international levels.

== Career ==
Husain came to Karachi in the 1960s after her marriage to Hamid Husain. Both she and husband were art students while in the UK. Marjorie was known as an artist in the community, however over the years she became a well known art critic. In the late 1960's, Marjorie joined a printmaking workshop organized at PACC by the American printmaker Michael Ponce de Lyon. The workshop was the first of its kind in Pakistan and gathered artists from the city. Here she met artists like Bashir Mirza and Masood Kohari. In 1965 Bashir Mirza opened the first commercial art gallery at Kutchery Road in Karachi. Mirza later moved to Germany and so the Gallery was relocated to SMHS. Marjorie was urged by artists to take over the gallery and so she became one of the founding members of Pakistan's first art gallery.

Marjorie continued with curating shows. During this time, Marjorie was encouraged by the women in her circle, who were working in the media, to start writing for newspapers. Najma Babar encouraged her to write for Dawn's Tuesday Magazine in the 90s. Marjorie then went on to write for Zohra Karim at the She magazine and for Fawzia Naqvi at Zameen. Marjorie has also written articles for Dawn, The Star, Newsline and The Frontier Post. Marjorie continued writing art reviews, however she soon realized the lack of information on Pakistani art. There were no museums, no informative books, no research material and very little documentation of the local artists. Marjorie then decided to start cataloging and archiving art and artists in Pakistan.

Marjorie has written many books, mostly on artists of Pakistan and art. She has written on Ali Imam, Ahmed Parvez, Jamil Naqsh, Bashir Mirza, Anna Molka Ahmed, Rabia Zuberi, Iqbal Hussain, Colin David and Nahid Raza. Her book Art views: Encounters With Artists in Pakistan is a compilation of her published articles on more than forty Pakistani artists. She is also the writer of the first textbook for art students in Pakistan called Aspects of Art. There was no textbook for Pakistani art students and students would often contact her for tips before their exams. In 2001, Marjorie's Aspects of Art, was published by OUP. The book was a compilation and history of both western and eastern art. The book has been translated to Urdu and is intended for both undergraduate, graduate art students.

Marjorie's work and documentation of Pakistani art made her popular guest at schools. She visited local schools to talk about art and her personal encounters with Pakistan's great artists. She documented their stories, art work and more.

She travelled frequently to Lahore, where she visited National College of Arts (NCA). Here she met many more artists like Shakir Ali, Saeed Akhtar, Ahmed Khan, and Colin David. She was also introduced to The Lahore group, a group of artists that started in the 1950's.

During her time in Pakistan, Marjorie has authored several books on art and also contributed essays to the country's newspapers and magazines. She was involved in art exhibitions of Pakistan and also involved with art students.

== Return to UK ==
In 2019, after living in Pakistan for nearly six decades, Marjorie moved back to England. Her husband had died and so Marjorie had decided to move back to her country.

== Publications ==
- Art views: Encounters with Artists in Pakistan
- Aspects of art: A Textbook for Students of Art (2000) (also published in Urdu)
- Iqbal Hussain: The Painter of Imprisoned Souls
- Ali Imam: Man of the Arts
- 20 Pakistani Women Artists You Should Know
- The Sun Blazes the Colours Through My Window
- A Selection of Contemporary Paintings from Pakistan
- The Art of Colin David
