= Deutsche Kolonien und Auslandpostämpter Stempelkatalog =

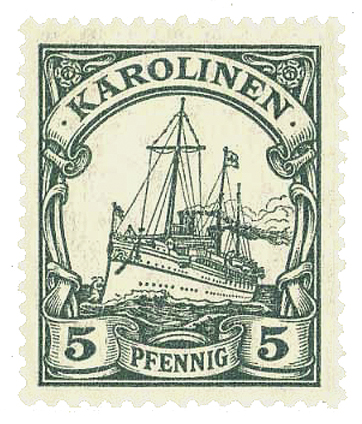
German colonial postage stamp, Caroline Islands, with an image of the imperial yacht Hohenzollern II

The Deutsche Kolonien und Auslandpostämpter Stempelkatalog (also known by its German acronym ARGE) is a philatelic reference which describes and publishes values for the postal markings found on the stamps of the German colonies and German post offices abroad. The catalog is published by the Arbeitsgemeinschaft der Sammler Deutscher Kolonialpostwertzeichen (Working Group of Collectors of German Colonial Postage Stamps).

The eighteenth edition was published in 2018. It features added content over prior editions, but also features fundamental changes to its layout to improve the clarity of the content.
