= Vineta provisional =

Rare unofficial German postage stamp

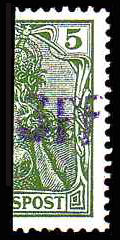
- Country of production: German Empire
- Date of production: 13 April 1901
- Nature of rarity: Bisect with overprint
- No. in existence: 600
- Face value: 3 Pfennig

The Vineta Provisional (German: Vineta-Provisorium) is a German postage stamp made on 13 April 1901 on board the cruiser SMS Vineta. The postal officer had not been supplied with 3 Pfennig Germania stamps, so he bisected his 5 Pfennig stamps (Michel Nummer 55) and stamped them by hand with a "3 PF" mark. Mail with the Vineta provisional stamp was sent from Pernambuco to Germany on 17 April 1901. Only 600 stamps were issued, making this provisional stamp one of the rarer stamps in German philately.

== Catalogue status ==
The stamp gained notoriety after it was included in the Michel catalogue as a regular stamp and given the number 67. Collectors who aspired to put together a complete collection of issues of the Reichspost had an interest in acquiring this stamp. However, because philatelists generally considered the stamp a self-made variety, not an official issue by the Reichspost, the #67 assignment was heavily criticised and eventually withdrawn. As a result, prices for the stamp have declined.

The stamp has been forged.

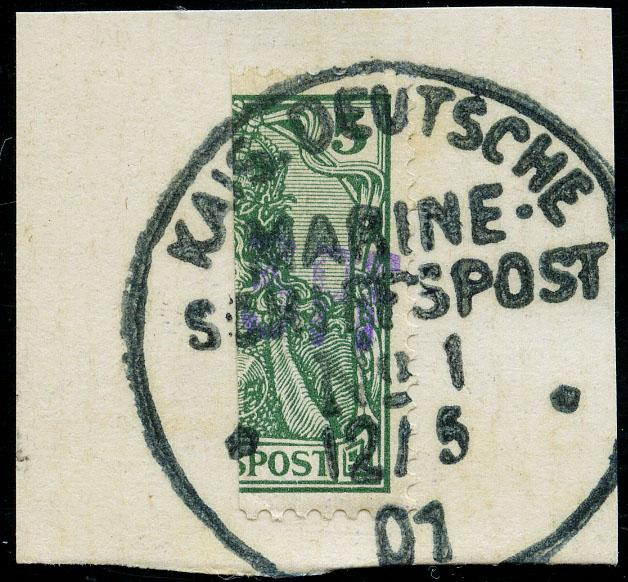
Fake Vineta Provisional on fragment

== References and sources ==
Sources

- Michel Deutschland Spezial 1997, Schwaneberger Verlag, ISBN 3-87858-129-7, page 225.
