= Mahmood Hayat =

Pakistani artist and teacher (born 1981)

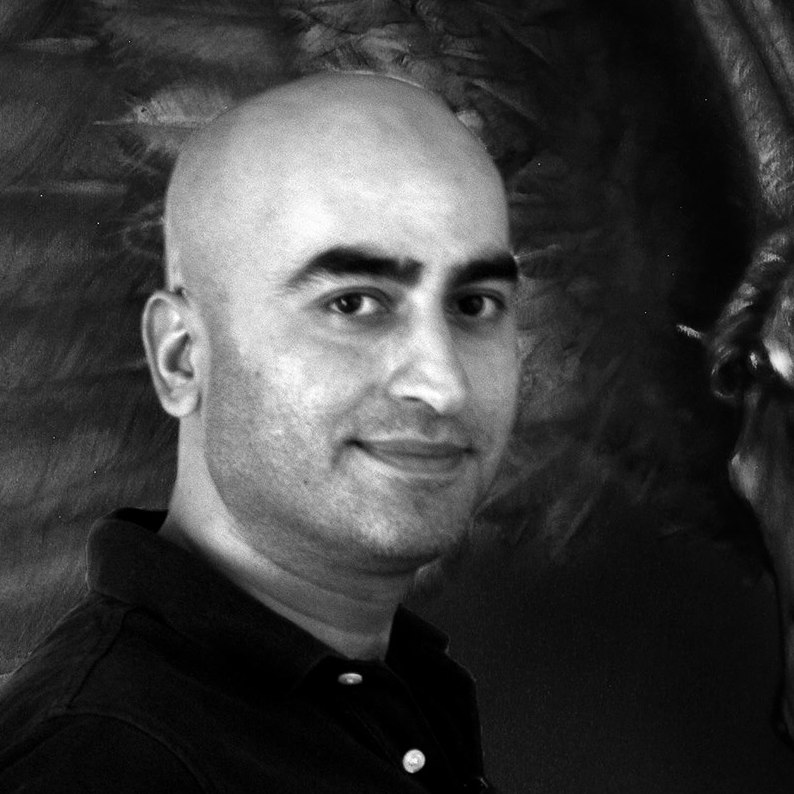
- Born: 1981 (age 44–45); Lahore, Pakistan
- Education: National College of Arts
- Known for: Artistry

Mahmood Hayat (born 1981) is a Pakistani artist and teacher. Raised in Lahore and descended from the warrior tribe Punjabi Pathan, Hayat began learning his craft from a young age, seeking inspiration from his brother's library collection and his father's workshop. He trained under Pakistani portrait painter Saeed Akhtar, and became influenced by his style. He graduated from the National College of Arts (NCA), and became a lecturer of Furniture Design at the Pakistan Institute of Fashion and Design (PIFD).

Hayat holds strong philosophies regarding his artwork; in particular it offers him solace from an often violent or frustrating world. At one point, the antagonism from his peers, who questioned whether an art career was commercially viable, caused him to lose faith in his abilities and destroy many of his works. Hayat has held two exhibitions which have met with positive reviews, and had a piece featured at the 2017 Venice Biennale. He has been compared to Renaissance artists, as well as the Pakistani artists Saeed Akhtar and Collin David, by English-language Pakistani broadsheet The International News.

== Life ==
=== Early life ===
Born in 1981 and raised in Lahore, Hayat asserts that his interest in pursuing art descended from his lineage – Punjabi Pathans in the tribe of Mohmand – which were known as warriors who crafted their weapons like artisans. From a young age Hayat began to draw on objects such as matchboxes and paper, and he first saw art in the pages of his brother's library collection. At the age of six, his elder brother taught him to paint surfaces with a brush. He would later recall that his family would often observe him "drawing cartoons on walls and doors". These experiences led to him to visit his father's French antique style interior furniture workshop Messrs Sharif Hayat, or Hayats' Furniture, where he observed his elders using various techniques, such as painting on wooden tables, mirrors, and stained glass. In particular, he watched a style called Trompe-l’œil, a technique which uses optical illusions to depict three-dimensional scenes on two-dimensional surfaces. It was here that Hayat honed his skills and matured as an artist, learning to create what he terms "both commissioned portraits and stylised works of art". Trips to Europe with his family cemented his love and appreciation for both art and architecture.

=== Later life ===
Hayat trained under Pakistani portrait painter Saeed Akhtar, building on the foundations of academic art to develop a distinctive contemporary representational style that encompasses portraits, landscapes, and fantasy-oriented subjects.

During this time, he dabbled in other forms of artistic expression such as architectural murals, and became a pioneering figure in Pakistani art video making. He also became enamoured by the theory of the golden ratio, and frequently placed it into his work. Hayat was faced with challenges from those who questioned if he was pursuing a financially secure career; of this time he said: "I was in a state of denial which made me lose most of my magnificent art works". He graduated from the National College of Arts (NCA), and became a lecturer of Furniture Design at the Pakistan Institute of Fashion and Design (PIFD). His work Muse of Hope was auctioned off by the Polish auction house Sopocki Dom Aukcyjny. In 2013, he converted his home into a private arts studio, where he currently teaches.

== Philosophy ==
Hayat considers art to be very personal, and based on one's own experiences. Much of his work involves the capturing of "interesting characters which influence (his) life"; animal forms such as humans and horses. He sees the twenty-first century as being full of "chaos and suffering [and a] Cult of Ugliness", fueled by television and digital arts, which he believes are contributing to a state of "violence, frustration and chronic depression". To remedy this, he injects beauty into his work by capturing the essence of a person; the act of which gives him a sense of solace and freedom. With Using Beauty as a Remedy for Life, Hayat asked the question "is it possible to be beautiful and fat?", and looked into whether objective standards of beauty existed. He believes that in the modern world, utility is seen as more important than beauty, citing the "commercial practices and advertisements [that] are bombarding viewers" to purchase items that have a specific use, for instance food or technology. The concept of a bird and its flight has also been fascinating to Hayat.

== Works ==
=== Mahmood Hayat (2013) ===
Mahmood Hayat's debut exhibition, named "Mahmood Hayat", was opened by former Punjab governor Shahid Hamid, at Nairang Art Galleries on 11 October 2013. It was the first solo exhibition by Hayat, and featured both water-color and pencil sketch works.

=== Using Beauty as a Remedy for Life (2014) ===
The Using Beauty as a Remedy for Life display was officially opened by Pakistani writer and television personality Mustansar Hussain Tarar at the NCA's Zahoorul Ikhlaq Gallery on 8 May 2014. It ran for a week and closed on 15 May of that year. The solo exhibition featured 25 portraits created using the techniques of: charcoal on paper, graphite on paper, water colours on paper and oil on canvas. Most of the guests on the exhibition's opening day were from NCA and PIFD. Hayat summed up his work by saying: "Man lives and dies in what he sees, but he sees only what he dreams”. An accompanying book was designed by creative house Creativ Team and published by the NCA.

=== High Hopes (2017) ===
A piece of art by Hayat entitled High Hopes was selected to be shown at the Venice Biennale in 2017. The oils on canvas is the smallest painting he has done to date, measuring 10x12cm. Art consultancy firm White Turban aided Hayat in getting the piece to feature at the exhibition.

== Reception ==
The International News described Hayat as "brilliant", and compared his 2013 solo exhibition to Renaissance artists, as well as the Pakistani artists Saeed Akhtar and Collin David. Observing Hayat's 2014 exhibition, Mustansar Hussain Tarar commented that he saw the beginnings of a new artist who had "spark" and who was sometimes "extremely brilliant".
