= Führing =

Führing or Fuhring is a surname. Notable people with the surname include:

- Angelika Führing (born 1976), German ice dancer
- Anna Führing (1866–1929), German actress and model
