= Germania (stamp) =

Series of postage stamps from Germany

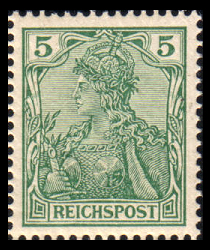
Germania stamp from the 1900 issue

Germania stamps are definitive stamps that were issued by the German Empire and the Weimar Republic between 1900 and 1922, depicting Germania. They represent the longest running series in German philately and are in their many variations and derivations an essential part of German philatelic collections.

== Design ==
The initial issue from January 1, 1900, replaced the standard issue depicting numbers and eagles. The image of Germania, rather than that of the ruling monarch as was customary in many other European monarchies, made it a unifying feature and did not complicate the relationship with other German royalty and the coexisting German postal authorities of Bavaria and Württemberg. The engraving was performed by Paul Eduard Waldraff (1870–1917) who used the actress Anna Führing as model. Wearing an octagonal imperial crown she is holding a sword and an olive branch. The Art Nouveau design depicting Führing was personally chosen by the emperor Wilhelm II.

== Issues inside Germany ==
The Germania stamp has many issues and variations. The 1900 issue is inscribed "Reichspost", all issues after April 1, 1902, carry the "Deutsches Reich" (German Empire) inscription. All issues after 1902 have watermarks. Within Germany Germania stamps were issued as follows:

=== German Empire ===
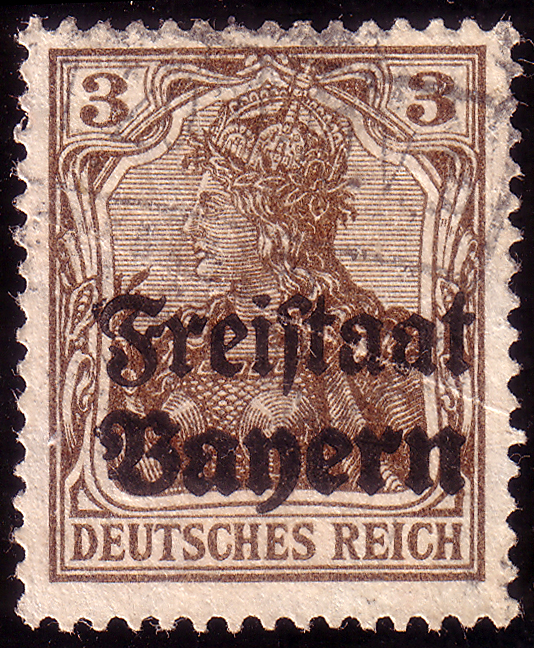
Use of Germania stamp in Bavaria, 1919

- 1900, January 1: Reichspost, German Empire, excluding Bavaria and Württemberg
- 1902, April 1, Deutsches Reich, including Württemberg
- 1905-13, Deutsches Reich
- 1915-17, Deutsches Reich, war printings
- 1916-19, Deutsches Reich, background without engraving lines

=== Weimar Republic ===
- 1919, May 1: Deutsches Reich, semipostal with surcharge for war veterans,
- 1919: Bavaria only: "Freistaat Bayern" overprint,
- 1920: Deutsches Reich, including Bavaria,
- 1921: Deutsches Reich, overprinted values,
- 1922, March: Deutsches Reich, last issue (75 Pfennig and 1 1/4 Mark).

=== Disputed areas ===
- 1920: Saargebiet, overprinted,
- 1922: Plebiscite areas of Allenstein and Marienwerder, overprinted,
- 1920: Memelland, overprinted.

== Issues outside Germany ==
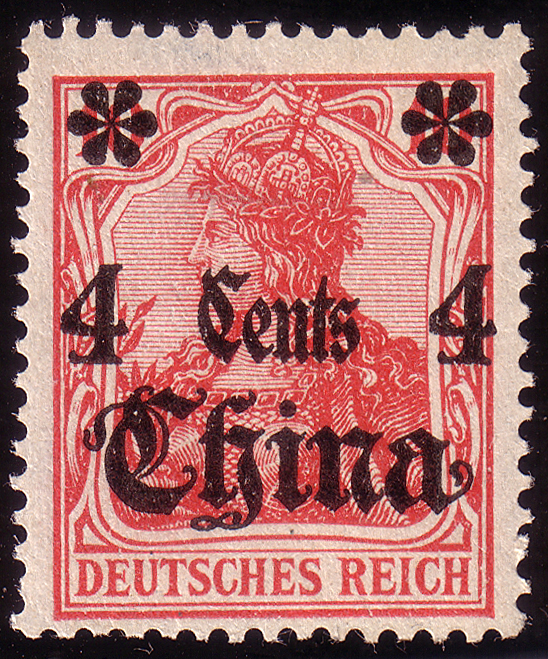
1905 Germania stamp, issued in China

Overprinted Germania stamps were used outside Germany. Prior to World War I they were released by German post offices abroad in a number of foreign countries, namely China, Morocco, and Turkey. During the First World War Germania stamps were released in occupied areas, namely in Belgium, France, "Postgebiet (des) Ob(erbefehlshabers) Ost" (eastern postal territory), "Russian Poland", "General-Gouvernement Warschau", and Romania. After the war, the stamps were also initially used with overprints in Danzig. Further, Polish postal authorities, Poczta Polska, also initially utilized overprinted Germania stamps.

One of the rarer German stamps is the Vineta provisional, a halved and overprinted Germania stamp that was issued by the cruiser Vineta in 1901.

Germania stamps were not issued in the German colonies, instead in those territories the Yacht issue was released first in 1900 with the appropriate identifying inscriptions.

== Postal stationeries ==
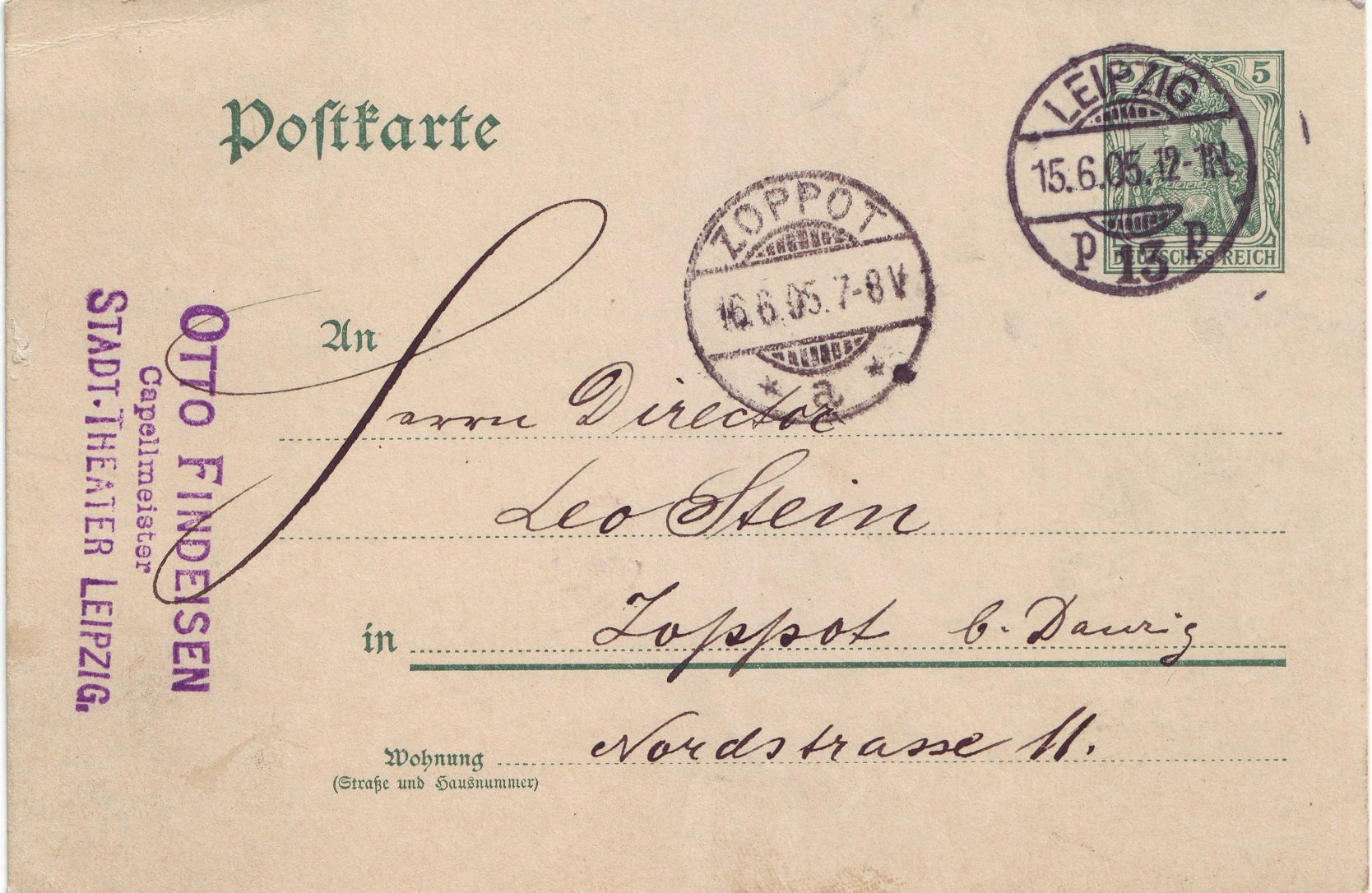
5 Pfennig postcard, sent from Leipzig to Zoppot (now Sopot in Poland) on 15 June 1905.

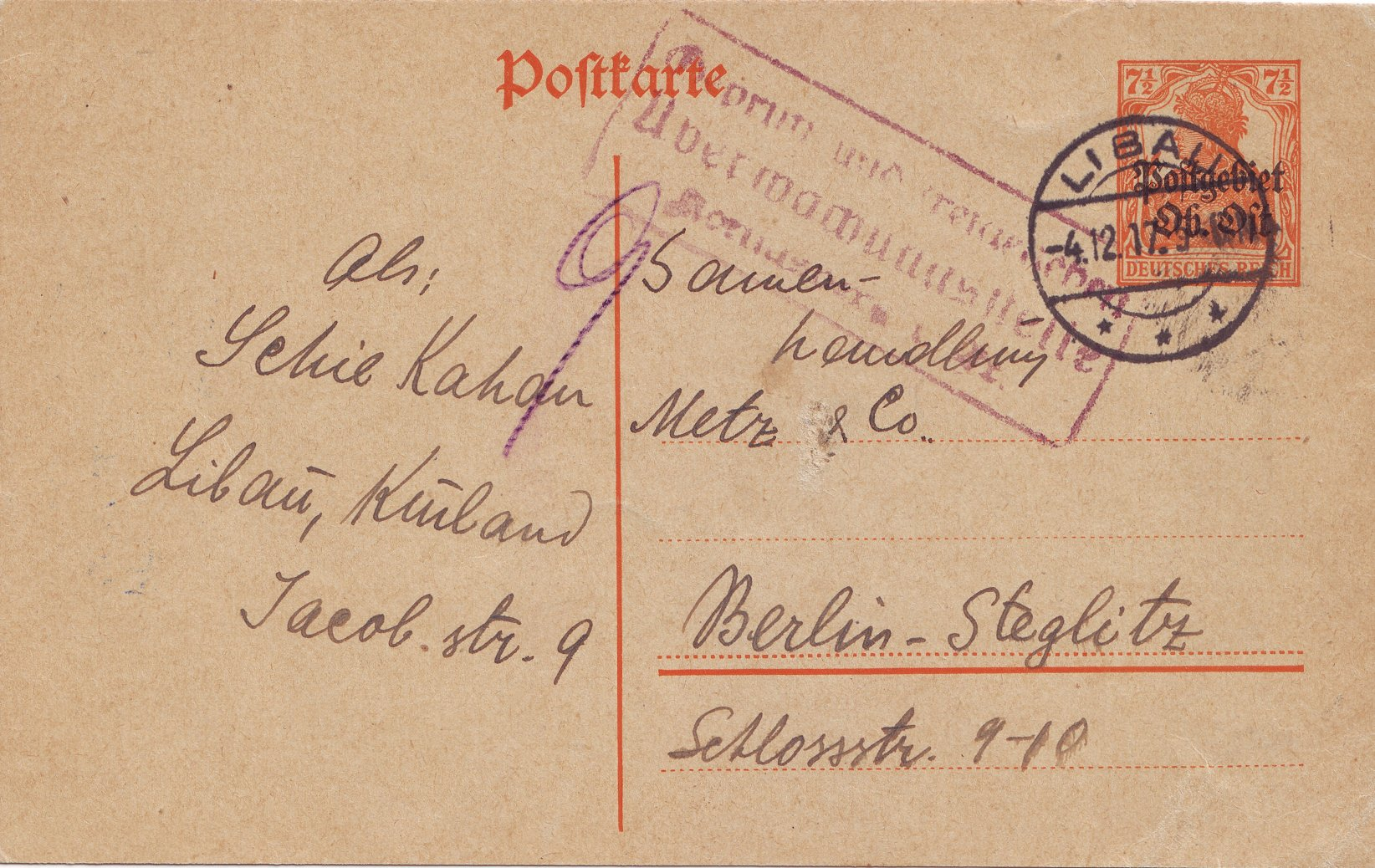
7½ Pfennig postcard with Ob. Ost overprint, sent from Libau (now Liepāja in Latvia) to Berlin on 4 December 1917. The rectangular stamp is a censor mark from Königsberg.

From 1900 onwards the Deutsche Reichspost issued several postal stationeries with imprinted Germania stamps. The most common one is a ‘Postkarte’ (postcard) with an imprinted 5 Pfennig stamp. In 1916 the German government introduced a tax on the postal traffic, the Reichsabgabe. This involved a raising of the postal rates and the 5 Pfennig postcard was replaced by a 7½ Pfennig postcard. In 1918 the Reichsabgabe was raised. Now the 10 Pfennig postcard for international mail had to be used for domestic mail too.

Postal stationeries with imprinted Germania stamps have been overprinted for the use in a.o.:

- Allenstein (overprint ‘Plébiscite Olsztyn Allenstein’);
- Bavaria (overprint ‘Freistaat Bayern’);
- Occupied Belgium (overprint ‘Belgien’ and value in Belgian francs);
- The Free City of Danzig (overprint ‘Danzig’);
- The Memel Territory (overprint ‘Memelgebiet’);
- Occupied Poland (overprints ‘Russisch Polen’ and ‘Gen.-Gouv. Warschau’);
- Occupied Romania (overprints ‘M.V.i.R.’ and ‘Rumänien’);
- Occupied Russia (overprint ‘Postgebiet Ob. Ost’);
- The Saargebiet (overprint ‘Saargebiet’).

In short, the postal stationeries with imprinted Germania stamps were almost as widely used as the stamps themselves.

== See also ==
- Postage stamps and postal history of Germany
- Michel catalog
- Scott catalog
