= German post offices in the Ottoman Empire =

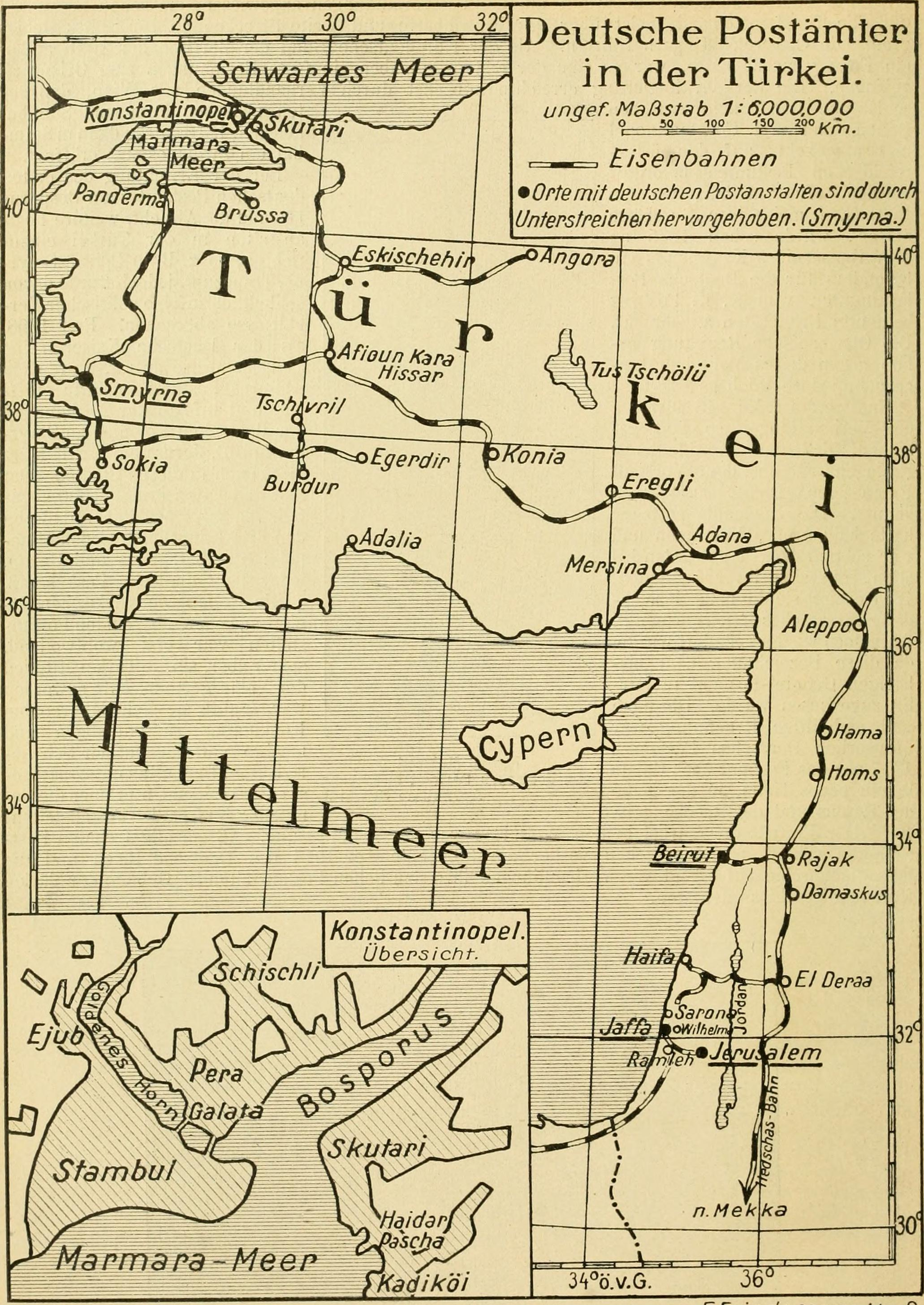
Albert Friedemann's map showing underlined names of towns with German post offices

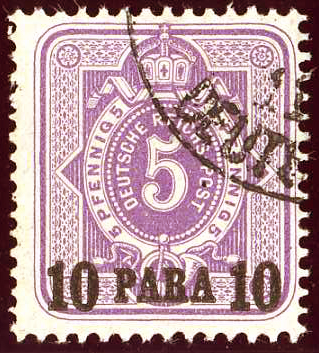
German stamp overprinted for use in Turkey, 1884

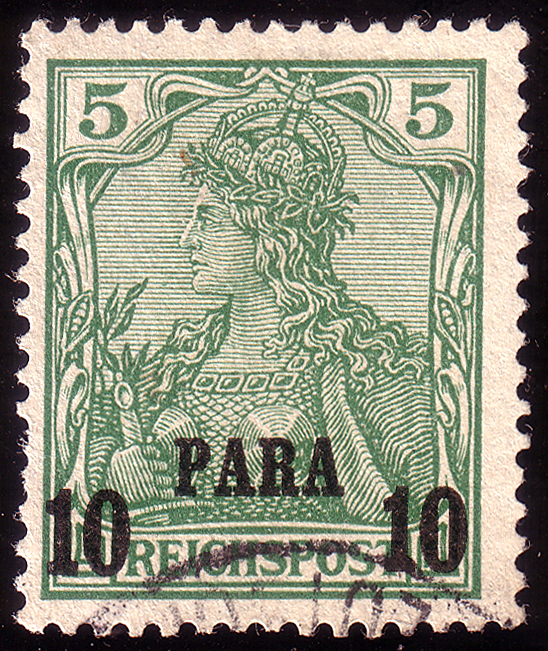
German stamp overprinted for use in Turkey, 1900

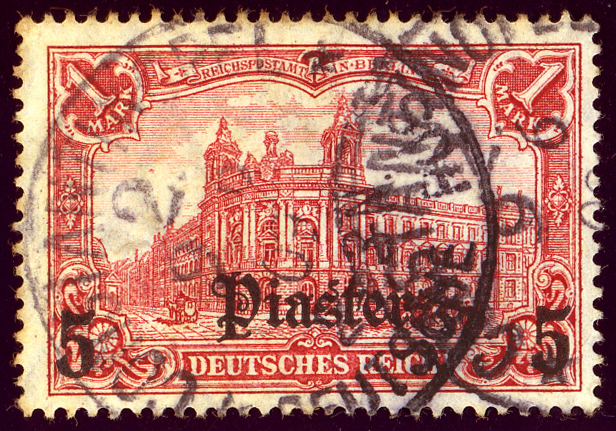
German stamp overprinted for use in Turkey, 1907

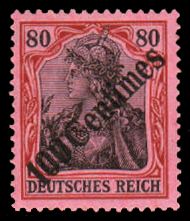
German stamp surcharged in French centimes, 1908

The German post offices abroad were a network of post offices in foreign countries established by Germany to provide mail service where the local services were deemed unsafe or unreliable. They were generally set up in cities with some sort of German commercial interest. In early use only the cancellation mark can identify their postal use abroad; such stamps are known as "Vorläufer" (forerunner) stamps. Later stamps are identified by overprints even when not postally used. German abroad stamps started appearing in the late 19th century and reached their heyday at the beginning of the 20th century; they closed down during or shortly after World War I.

It was not unusual for countries to maintain such offices and Austria-Hungary, China, France, Greece, Italy, Romania, Russia, the United Kingdom and the United States all did so. In the latter part of the 19th century and into the 20th century, having extraterritorial post offices was one indication of a nation's international power.

== Background and history ==
On March 1, 1870, the Norddeutscher Postbezirk (i.e. the postal service of the North German Confederation) opened its first office in Constantinople (Istanbul) using definitive stamps without overprint. After January 1872, the Reichspost took over the management of the office and expanded it further as "Deutsche Post in der Türkei". Prior to 1884, this office used ordinary definitive German stamps without any distinctive overprint.

Starting in 1884, stamps began to be issued with overprints restating the stamp's face value in the Turkish denominations, i.e. piasters and paras. The overprint did not include an additional country name, as was the case with stamps issued for use at the German post offices in Morocco and China.

As was the case with all German Offices Abroad issues, stamps issued prior to 1905 had overprints in a "Latin" font in several varieties. Starting in 1905, the overprint was changed to a "Gothic" font which continued in use until the beginning of the First World War.

Beginning in 1908, the German Post Offices in Turkey issued an additional set of stamps which it sold at the same time as the series overprinted with values in Turkish piasters. This 1908 series had diagonal overprints with new denominations in French centimes instead of horizontal overprints in Turkish piaster denominations. The Reichspost decided to issue this French currency series as exchange rates made the parcel post rates charged by the German Post Office more expensive than those of other countries also operating in Turkey. For whatever reason, accepting French francs in exchange for stamps apparently made the German Parcel Post rates more competitive once more.

With the entry of Turkey into World War I the offices were closed on 30 September 1914.

== Offices ==
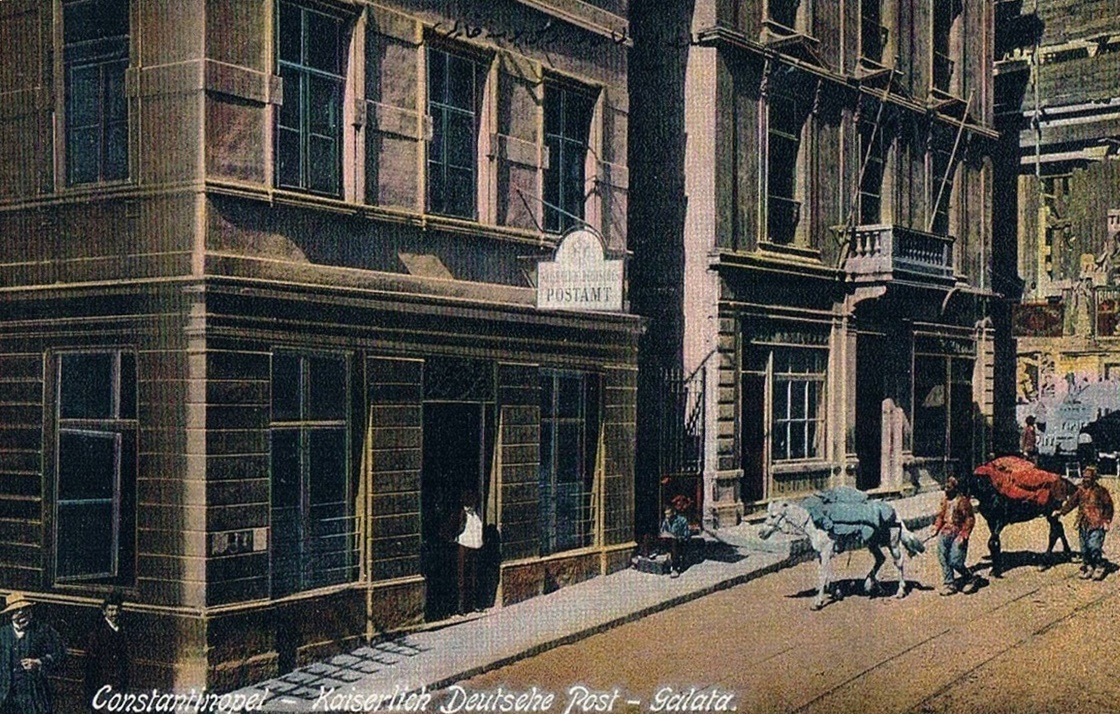
The post office in Galata, Constantinople

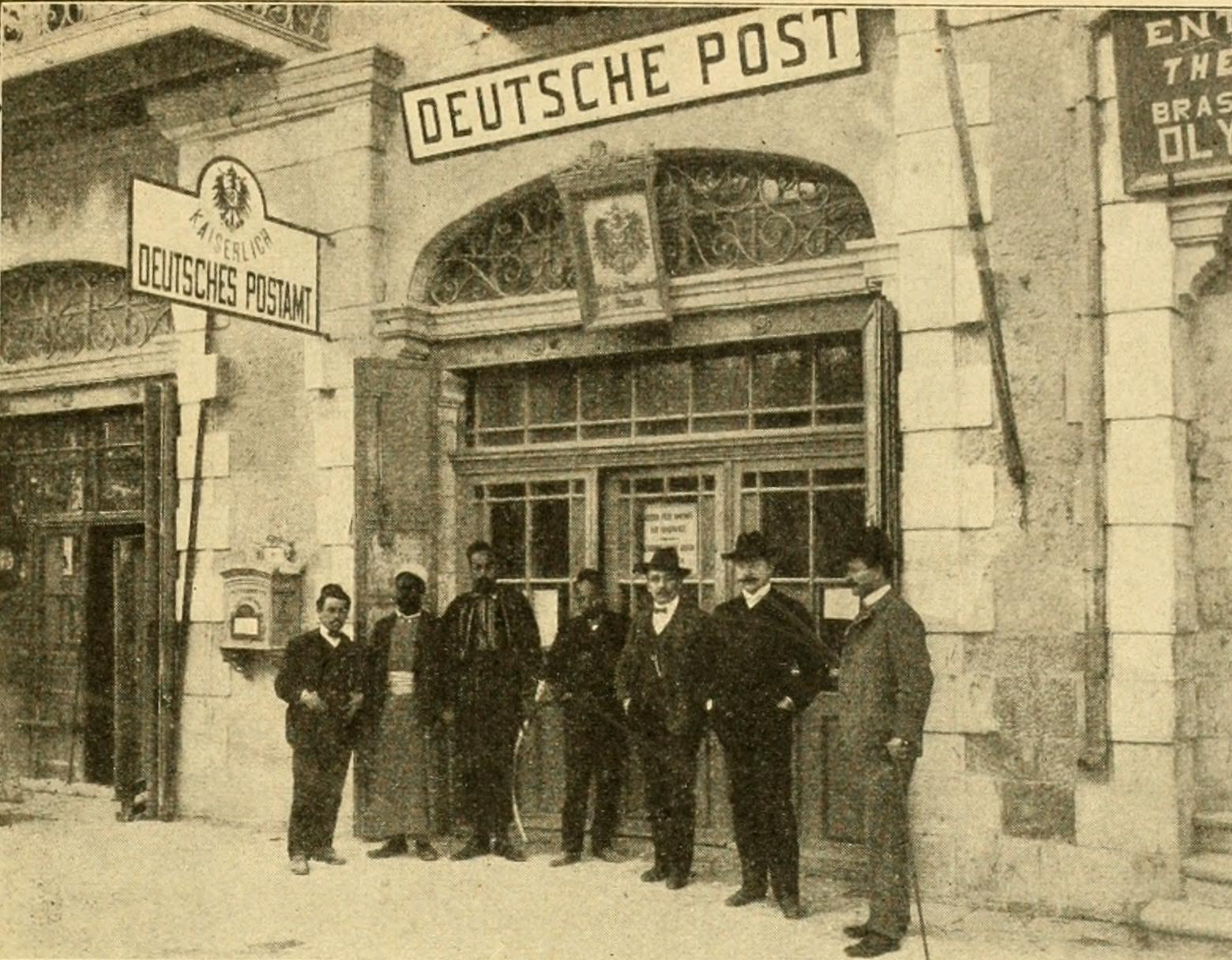
German post office in Jerusalem

Post offices existed in these towns:

- Constantinopel—three post offices eventually opened in the Galata, Pera, and Stamboul districts of the city.
- Beirut
- Jaffa
- Jerusalem
- Smyrna

== See also ==
- German post offices abroad
- German post offices in China
- German post offices in Morocco
- German post offices in Zanzibar
- List of postal services abroad
