= German post offices in Morocco =

The German post offices abroad were a network of post offices in foreign countries established by Germany to provide mail service where the local services were deemed unsafe or unreliable. They were generally set up in cities with some sort of German commercial interest. In early use only the cancellation mark can identify their postal use abroad; such stamps are known as "Vorläufer" (forerunner) stamps. Later stamps are identified by overprints even when not postally used. German abroad stamps started appearing in the late 19th century and reached their heyday at the beginning of the 20th century; they closed down during or shortly after World War I.

It was not unusual for countries to maintain such offices; Austria-Hungary, China, France, Greece, Italy, Romania, Russia, the United Kingdom and the United States all did so. In the latter part of the 19th century and into the 20th century, having extraterritorial post offices was one indication of a nation's international power.

Stamps from German post offices abroad are popular with collectors and some are quite valuable. In a 2006 auction, a 40 Pfennig Germania hand-stamped "China" (Tientsin issue) stamp from 1900 realized 100,152 Euros.

== German post offices in Morocco ==
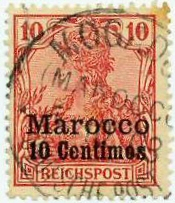
Morocco, 1900

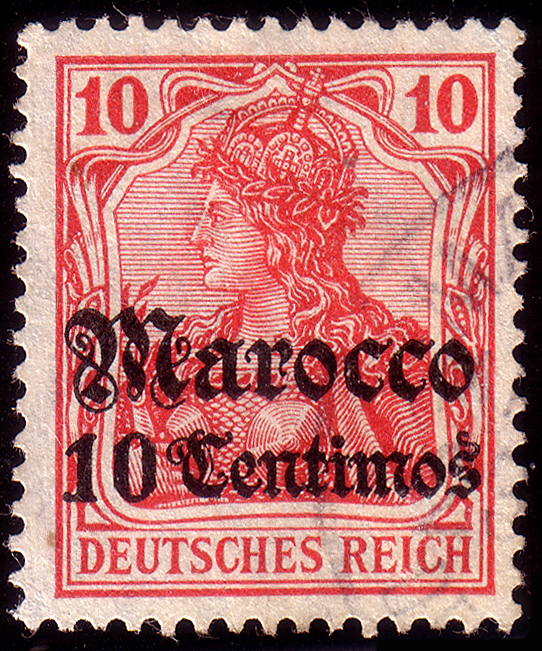
Morocco, 1905

German post offices in Morocco (German: Deutsche Post in Marokko) started to operate in 1899. German definitive stamps were used with overprints; after the first issue the value was changed to pesetas and centimos. German post offices closed in French-controlled Morocco in 1914, and in Spanish-controlled Morocco and Tangier in 1919.

Post offices existed in these towns (name per cancellation stamps):

- International control:
  - Tanger
- Spanish control
  - Alkassar
  - Arsila
  - Larache
  - Tetuan
- French control:
  - Asimmur
  - Casablanca
  - Fez
  - Fez-Mellah
  - Marrakesch
  - Mazagan
  - Meknes
  - Mogador
  - Rabat
  - Saffi

== See also ==
- German post offices abroad
- German post offices in China
- German post offices in the Ottoman Empire
- German post offices in Zanzibar
- List of postal services abroad
