= The Wonderful Adventure =

1924 film directed by Manfred Noa

- Directed by: Manfred Noa
- Written by: Robert Liebmann
- Produced by: Hanns Lippmann
- Starring: Vilma Bánky; Georg Alexander; Ernst Reicher
- Cinematography: Károly Vass
- Music by: Giuseppe Becce
- Production company: Gloria-Film
- Distributed by: UFA
- Release date: 22 December 1924
- Country: Germany
- Languages: Silent; German intertitles

The Wonderful Adventure (German: Das schöne Abenteuer) is a 1924 German silent film directed by Manfred Noa and starring Vilma Bánky, Georg Alexander and Ernst Reicher.

The film's sets were designed by the art director Oscar Werndorff.

== Cast ==
- Vilma Bánky as Bessy Ferguson
- Georg Alexander
- Ernst Reicher as Micky
- Hans Unterkircher as Seine Hoheit, der Prinz
- Wolfgang von Schwindt
- Hans Albers as Henry Valescu
- Anna Führing
- Eugen Burg as Kiminalinspektor
- Loni Pyrmont

== Bibliography ==
- Schildgen, Rachel A. More Than A Dream: Rediscovering the Life and Films of Vilma Banky. 1921 PVG Publishing, 2010.
