= Jimmy Engineer =

Pakistani artist

Jimmy Engineer HI
- Born: August 13, 1954 (age 71); Loralai, Balochistan
- Education: St. Anthony's High School (Lahore), Forman Christian College
- Alma mater: National College of Arts, Lahore
- Known for: Pakistan Movement paintings; civic and philanthropic work
- Awards: Hilal-i-Imtiaz (2024); Sitara-i-Imtiaz (2005); China Peace Medal; National Endowment for the Arts (1989)
- Website: jimmyengineer.com

Jimmy Engineer (born 13 August 1954, Loralai, Balochistan) is a Pakistani artist, social worker, philanthropist and stamp designer. His father and grandfather were both engineers, and the surname was adopted in keeping with Zoroastrian custom.

Best known for his large-scale paintings on the Partition of India and the Pakistan Movement, Engineer has held more than 100 exhibitions in Pakistan and abroad and received more than 70 awards over the course of his career, among them the Hilal-i-Imtiaz (2024) and the Sitara-i-Imtiaz (2005). Alongside his artistic practice, he has been active in civic and philanthropic causes for several decades.

== Early life and education ==
Engineer was drawing by the age of five, working initially with powder and water colours. He attended St. Anthony's High School in Lahore, then enrolled briefly at Forman Christian College before moving on. Three years at the National College of Arts (NCA) in Lahore followed, where Shakir Ali served as principal and Khalid Iqbal taught fine arts. He left without graduating. Moving to Karachi, he opened his own studio and began his professional career.

== Beliefs ==
Engineer is a Zoroastrian. He has spoken of his community's precarious position in the modern world: once rulers of the Persian empire, Zoroastrians now number around 1,400 in Pakistan and roughly 150,000 globally, and are widely regarded as endangered. He also counts himself among the followers of the Sufis, in particular Data Ganj Bakhsh and Barkat Ali of Faisalabad, whom he has described as his spiritual master. It was Barkat Ali who urged him to put his recurring dreams of bloodshed and violence onto canvas, an act of spiritual direction that gave rise to his large-scale Pakistan Movement paintings.

== Artist ==
Engineer turned professional in 1976. His earliest series centred on the Partition of India, work he would begun in the early 1970s. The paintings document the mass migration of Muslims across the subcontinent in 1947, the suffering and sacrifice of that period, and were conceived partly as a record for generations with no memory of those events. The dreams that prompted them were disturbing enough that Engineer sought counsel from religious scholars, who advised him to transfer the imagery to canvas. Backlit transparency prints from the series are on permanent display at Bab-e-Azadi (Wagah Border), the Pakistan Movement Workers Complex, the Punjab Assembly and the Chief Minister's Secretariat in Lahore, among other sites around the country. In 1982, at the invitation of Javed Iqbal, son of Allama Iqbal, he produced an illustrated version of Iqbal's Javednama.

The range of his work is considerable. Landscapes, seascapes, still life, portrait and architectural subjects sit alongside calligraphy, miniature, abstract and historical painting; he has also worked in ceramics and wood. Ancient Pakistani civilisations, among them Mohenjo-daro, Mehrgarh, Harappa and Gandhara, feature prominently among his themes, as do compositions placing famous buildings from different countries side by side, a device he uses to explore cultural exchange and coexistence. He works across scales and in both colour and black-and-white.

Engineer has produced over 3,000 paintings, more than 1,800 of them abstract, alongside over 2,000 calligraphies, more than 1,500 drawings and upwards of 700,000 prints, held in private collections across more than 60 countries. Institutions holding his originals include the National Art Museum of China in Beijing, as well as two drawings each in the National Gallery of Fine Arts in Jordan and the Royal Ontario Museum. Within Pakistan, his work features in the holdings of multinational companies, private collectors and NGOs; at the opening of Shaukat Khanum Hospital, he donated over 200 calligraphy paintings. He has shown in more than 100 exhibitions at home and abroad.

=== Critical reception ===
Art critic Marjorie Husain, writing in her biography In Search of My Master, placed Engineer's work between realism and symbolism, and saw in it affinities with both European Renaissance painting and eastern Mughal miniature. Editor S.M. Shahid, in the same volume, noted that Engineer's handling of natural light places him close to the Impressionists, while his preference for ordinary subjects, everyday people and everyday scenes, sets him apart from the Renaissance tradition of painting the powerful.

== Stamp design ==
Among Engineer's stamp commissions is a four-stamp se-tenant set issued on 14 August 2000, depicting immigrants crossing from India into Pakistan, imagery drawn directly from his Partition series. Philatelic scholars have cited the set as one of the more accomplished examples of hand-illustrated pictorial stamp design in Pakistan's postal history. One of his designs has also been issued in Indonesia.

== Social work ==
Engineer's civic commitments have run parallel to his artistic career throughout. He has argued publicly that Pakistan's ruling and wealthy classes carry a particular obligation to the poor, not charity as an afterthought, but a genuine share of earnings and a posture of service rather than authority. Internationally, he presents himself as an informal envoy for the country, countering negative perceptions and pointing to the humanitarian legacies of Abdul Sattar Edhi and Adeebul Hasan Rizvi as evidence of what Pakistan produces.

For fifteen years, he ran a sustained programme of outings for children with disabilities, taking groups of between 200 and 6,000 to hotels, restaurants and public venues. He has campaigned on behalf of prisoners, widows and those in poverty, and was central to establishing the first judicial complex inside Central Jail Karachi, designed to shorten the delays prisoners face in reaching the courts. Over 260 awareness campaigns for disabled children and orphans have been organised under his initiative.

Engineer has described himself as having introduced the concept of the 'walk-for-a-cause' in Pakistan, and has taken part in more than fifty such walks. In 1994 he walked from Karachi to Peshawar, over 4,000 kilometres (2,500 mi), pausing at villages along the way to observe conditions firsthand; what he found, communities without clean water, reliable food or electricity, left a lasting impression. A peace walk from Islamabad to Delhi followed in 2001, though it ended at the Wagah border when diplomatic ties between the two countries were severed. He has continued to advocate for normalised relations with India. He also walked alongside Ruth Pfau in support of leprosy awareness.

During the production of the 1997 film Jinnah, directed by Professor Akbar Ahmed and starring Christopher Lee in the title role, Engineer mounted a solo fundraising effort on the project's behalf after the government withdrew its partial funding commitment, an effort that included walking from Karachi to Lahore. He remained present throughout filming in both cities and, as he'd pledged at the outset, saw Ahmed off at the airport when the shoot concluded.

Engineer has donated over 700,000 prints to charitable organisations around the world and has said that ninety per cent of his earnings have gone to philanthropic causes over the course of his career. In 2017, he opened the fifth Centre for Street Children run by the Society for the Protection of the Rights of Children (SPARC), located in the Waheedabad area of Islamabad.

== Biography ==
A biography, In Search of My Master: Jimmy Engineer, was written by art critic Marjorie Husain and published by Pervez Iqbal. It traces his artistic development and draws on work across calligraphy, painting and drawing, organised into thematic sections, among them a dedicated chapter on the partition paintings. The book's launch was accompanied by an exhibition of more than 100 prints.

== Honours and awards ==
- 1989: National Endowment for the Arts award, United States.
- 2005: Sitara-i-Imtiaz (Star of Excellence) for Art, Government of Pakistan.
- 2009: Honorary citizen and goodwill ambassador of Houston, Texas.
- 2024: Hilal-i-Imtiaz (Crescent of Excellence) for Art, Government of Pakistan.
- China Peace Medal.
- Ambassador for Peace, Universal Peace Federation, Canada.

== See also ==
- Pakistan Movement
- Partition of India
- National College of Arts
- Jinnah (film)
