= Saeed Akhtar =

Pakistani portrait painter

- Born: 1938 (age 87–88)
- Education: National College of Arts
- Awards: Sitara-i-Imtiaz (2011); Pride of Performance Award (1993)

Saeed Akhtar (Urdu: سعید اختر) (born 1938) is a Pakistani portrait painter. He has received the Sitara-e-Imtiaz Award from the President of Pakistan.

== Early life and career ==
Saeed Akhtar was born in Ghakhar, Punjab, British India in 1938. His father Fazal Karim was an education instructor for the British Indian Army and provided his services in Quetta, Pakistan. So his family moved there when he was still very young. His father was an Urdu language teacher. Saeed Akhtar graduated from National College of Arts, Lahore where he studied art from the famous Pakistani artist Shakir Ali. Akhtar's own students include Pakistani artist Mahmood Hayat and R. M. Naeem. He also studied figure drawing from Italy.

After graduating from National Council of Arts in Lahore, Akhtar joined its teaching staff. His major commission from this time was his portrait of Muhammad Ali Jinnah done in 1970. This painting currently hangs in the State Bank of Pakistan building in Islamabad. His work has also been displayed in many exhibitions in Pakistan. Akhtar was commissioned to design Pakistan's largest stamp issue consisting of 27 stamps (1990, SG 801–827) on pioneers of freedom.

== Awards and recognition ==
- Pride of Performance Award by the President of Pakistan in 1993
- Sitara-i-Imtiaz (Star of Excellence) Award by the President of Pakistan in 2011
