= German post offices abroad =

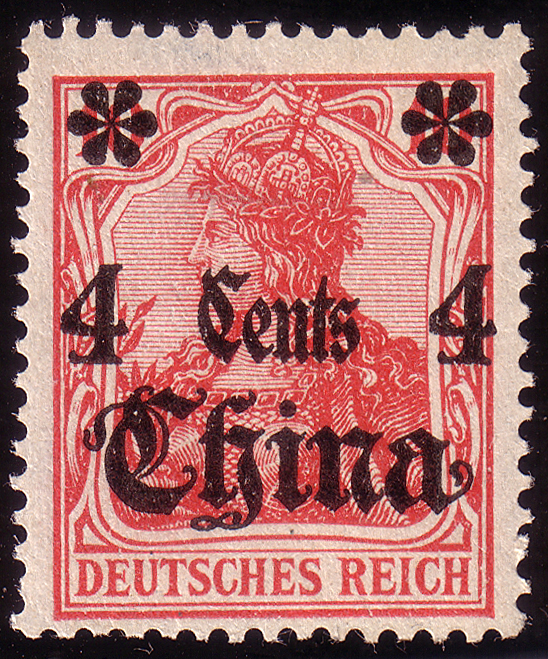
A German stamp overprinted for use in China

The German post offices abroad were an extraterritorial network of German post offices in foreign countries with a significant German commercial interest to provide mail service where the local services were generally deemed unsafe or unreliable, such as China, Morocco, Ottoman Empire and Zanzibar. The system ended during or shortly after World War I.

The cancellation mark of the mail processed by the German system in the early period are the only means of identifying the point of use; such stamps are known as "Vorläufer" (forerunner) stamps. Later stamps are identified by overprints of the place of issuance even when not for postal use. German abroad stamps started appearing in the late 19th century and reached their heyday at the beginning of the 20th century.

Stamps from German post offices abroad are popular with collectors and some can be valuable. In a 2006 auction, a 40 Pfennig Germania hand-stamped "China" (Tientsin issue) stamp from 1900 realized 100,152 Euros.

Other countries maintained postal offices abroad. In the latter part of the 19th century and into the 20th century and having extraterritorial post offices were a perceived indication of a nation's international power.

== References and sources ==
Sources

- Michel-Katalog Deutschland Spezial. Schwaneberger Verlag GmbH. 1997. ISBN 3-87858-129-7.
