= Nahid Raza =

Pakistani painter (born 1948)

- Born: Nahid Raza; 1948 (age 77–78); Delhi, India
- Other names: Trend Setter of Her Generation Artists
- Education: University of Karachi
- Occupation: Painter
- Years active: 1968–present
- Spouse: Maqsood Ali (m. 1971; div. 1982) (husband)
- Children: 2
- Relatives: S. Ali Imam (uncle)
- Awards: Pride of Performance award by the President of Pakistan (2008)

Nahid Raza (born 1948) is a contemporary Pakistani artist known for her semi-abstract paintings. Her work is characterized by symbolic imagery and a style that combines traditional motifs with modern techniques.

She is known as The Trend Setter of Her Generation Artists. Over several decades, she has addressed complex themes relating to culture, spirituality, and women's rights.

In 2008, she was awarded the President's Pride of Performance award, one of Pakistan's highest civilian honors.

== Early life and education ==
She was born in Delhi, India, in 1948, Raza comes from a family with a strong artistic and literary background. Her family moved to Pakistan during the partition. Her parents, who emphasized education, initially intended for her to study medicine, but her uncle, the artist S. Ali Imam, recognized her talent and helped her enroll at the Central Institute of Arts and Crafts in 1966.

She completed her BA from the University of Karachi at the same time as graduating from the Central Institute of Art and Crafts.

Early in her career, Raza held her first group exhibition in 1968 while still a student, and she won her first award in 1969 at the Arts Council of Pakistan Karachi. She completed her arts course in 1970.

== Career ==
=== Artistic development ===
In the early 1970s, Raza's observations of life, particularly the concrete balconies and patterned wall openings of her family home, inspired her Jharoke (balcony) series. These early works incorporated geometrical designs and Islamic motifs, influenced by Byzantine art. A visit to the Chaukhandi Tombs outside Karachi in the early 1980s marked a significant shift in her work. Inspired by the intricate stone carvings of the ancient necropolis, she created her acclaimed Chowkandi Tombs series.

=== Feminist and spiritual themes ===
Throughout her career, Raza has become known for her focus on women's experiences within a patriarchal society. She became known for her work "Woman series". This notable series began in the 1970s, reflecting her awareness of a woman's role in society and exploring themes of identity, joy, and anguish. Critic S. Amjad Ali reviewed an exhibition of the series in 1985, noting the large, abstract paintings were rich in color and symbolic captions like "Woman — Symbol of Strength".

Later she made a painting about "Virdh series". In more recent work, Raza has delved into themes of spirituality, meditation, and Sufism. These paintings feature repetitive Islamic motifs and clusters of the Arabic letter alif, which she uses as a symbol of God.

=== Studio Art ===
After returning to Karachi in 1987, Raza began teaching art full-time. In 1992, she established Studio Art in Karachi. Over the next decade, the institute provided a space for many emerging artists to develop their skills.

=== Exhibitions and collections ===
Raza's work has been featured in exhibitions and collections internationally. Her work has been shown in solo exhibitions in cities such as Tokyo, Dhaka, New Delhi, and Vienna. She was awarded a residency at New York State University in 1998. Four works from her Chowkandi Tombs series are held in the collection of Bradford Museums and Galleries.

== Personal life ==
In 1971, Raza married artist Maqsood Ali, who was also a peer in the art world. The marriage ended in divorce in the early 1980s. She has two children, Zainab and Azfar. Her son, Azfar Ali, has also entered the arts as a filmmaker.

== Awards and recognition ==
- Pride of Performance award by the President of Pakistan in 2008.
- She won Best Entry Award, Arts Council of Pakistan Karachi (1969).
- She won second prize, Fine Arts Section of the Pakistan National Visual Arts Exhibition, Islamabad (1981).

== Style ==
Raza's style is often described as semi-abstract, with a strong focus on symbolic imagery to convey emotional and cultural ideas. She employs vibrant colors, geometric forms, and bold brushstrokes to create a sense of movement and energy. Her themes of cultural heritage and women's rights are recurrent throughout her diverse body of work.
