= Colin David =

Pakistani artist (1937–2008)

- Born: December 1937; Karachi, British India
- Died: 25 February 2008 (aged 70); Lahore, Pakistan
- Occupation: Painter (artist)
- Awards: Pride of Performance Award by the President of Pakistan (1995)

Colin David (December 1937 – 25 February 2008) (کولن ڈیوڈ) was one of Pakistan's most popular painter-artists of the 1970s. He was mostly famous for his figurative nudes.

== Early life and education ==
Colin David was born in Karachi, British India in December, 1937. He started studying art in the Fine Arts Department of Punjab University, Lahore in 1956. In 1961, he graduated with a master's degree in Fine Arts. He went on to study at the Slade School of Art, London where he was guided by Sir William Coldstream.

== Career ==
Colin David returned to Pakistan in 1962 and rejoined the faculty of the Fine Arts Department at Punjab University, Lahore and taught there until 1964. He was known to his friends as a friendly, thoroughly professional and encouraging teacher.

=== Teaching ===
Colin David also taught at the National College of Arts, Lahore for over two decades.

== Painting exhibits ==
=== Solo ===
- Lahore – 1962, 1965, 1970, 1974, 1983, 1990, 1993
- Karachi – 1970, 1974, 1980
- Rawalpindi – 1971, 1975

== Collections ==
His paintings are displayed at the Clifton Art Gallery, Karachi, Pakistan Arts Council, Lahore, National Art Gallery, Pakistan and National Arts Gallery, Jordan.

== Awards ==
- 1979: Quaid-e-Azam Award for Painting
- 1995: Pride of Performance Award by the President of Pakistan

== Death ==
Colin David died on 25 February 2008 at Lahore, Pakistan.
