= Bisects and splits =

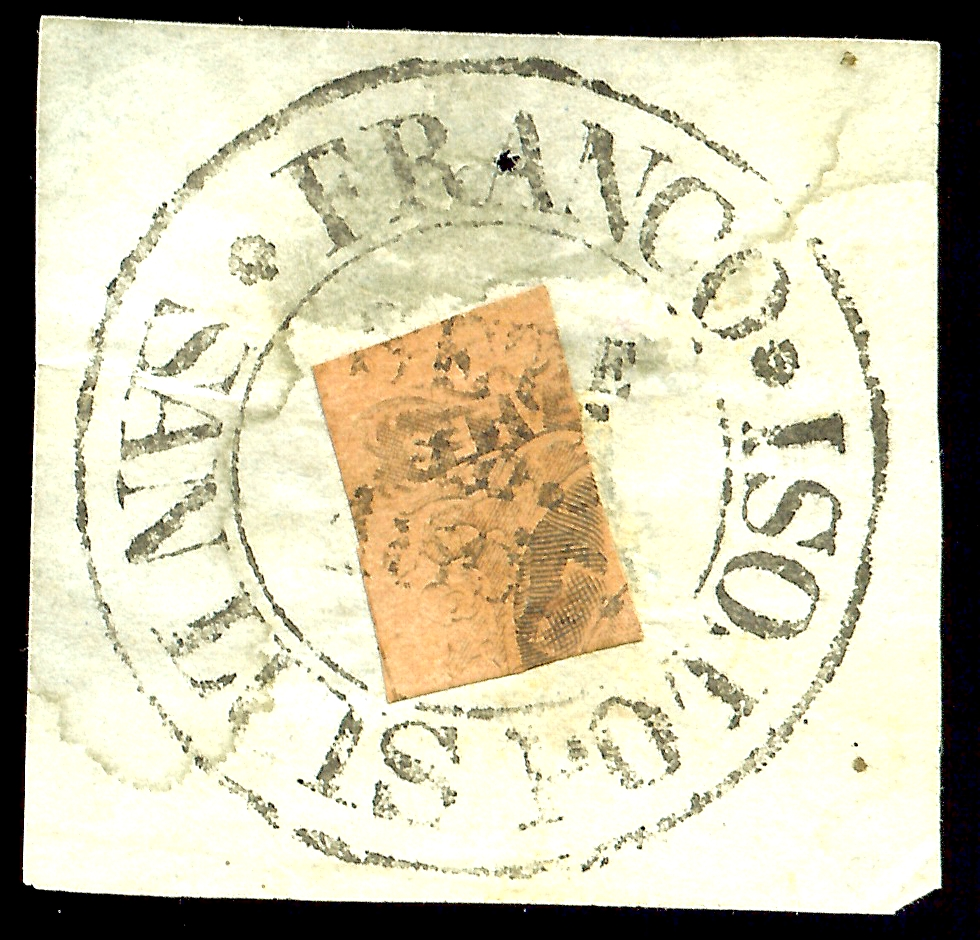
Mexico 1861 8 reales stamp, quartered for use as 2 reales value, with San Luis Potosí cancellation

Bisects and splits refer to postage stamps that have been cut in part, most commonly in half, but also other fractions, and postally used for the proportionate value of the entire stamp, such as a two cent stamp cut in half and used as a one cent stamp. When stocks of a certain stamp ran out, postmasters sometimes resorted to cutting higher denominated stamps in half, vertically or diagonally, thus obtaining two "stamps" each representing half of the original monetary value, or "face" value, of the uncut stamp. The general public also resorted to this practice, sometimes pursuant to official or tacit permission and sometimes without any express authorization.

Many of these instances have been well documented in postal history. One example is the bisects of the Island of Guernsey during the German military occupation of the Channel Islands during World War II. Early Mexican stamps are known to have been used cut in half, three-quarters, quarters and even eighths.

Many bisects and splits are considerably more valuable than the stamps from which they were made. These, however, only have philatelic value when the cut portion is still affixed to the envelope or a piece showing the postmarks, as otherwise it cannot be confirmed that the stamp was in fact postally used as a split and not simply a complete stamp that was cut up after use.

== Gallery ==
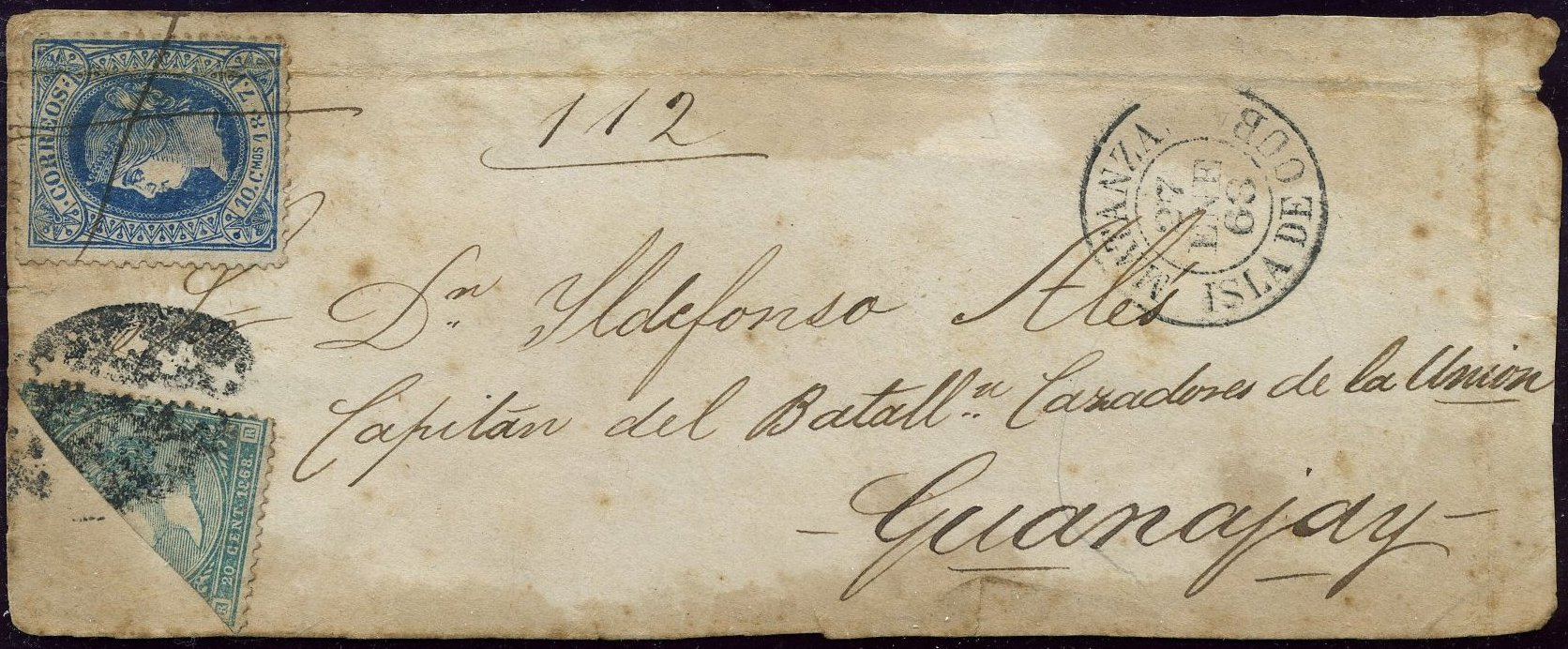
Bisected stamp (with regular full stamp) on an 1868 letter from Matanzas to Guanajay, La Habana Province, Cuba. The 20 céntimos stamp was cut in half to be used as a 10 céntimos de escudo stamp. The bisect is cancelled with a parilla handstamp and the other is a pen cancellation.

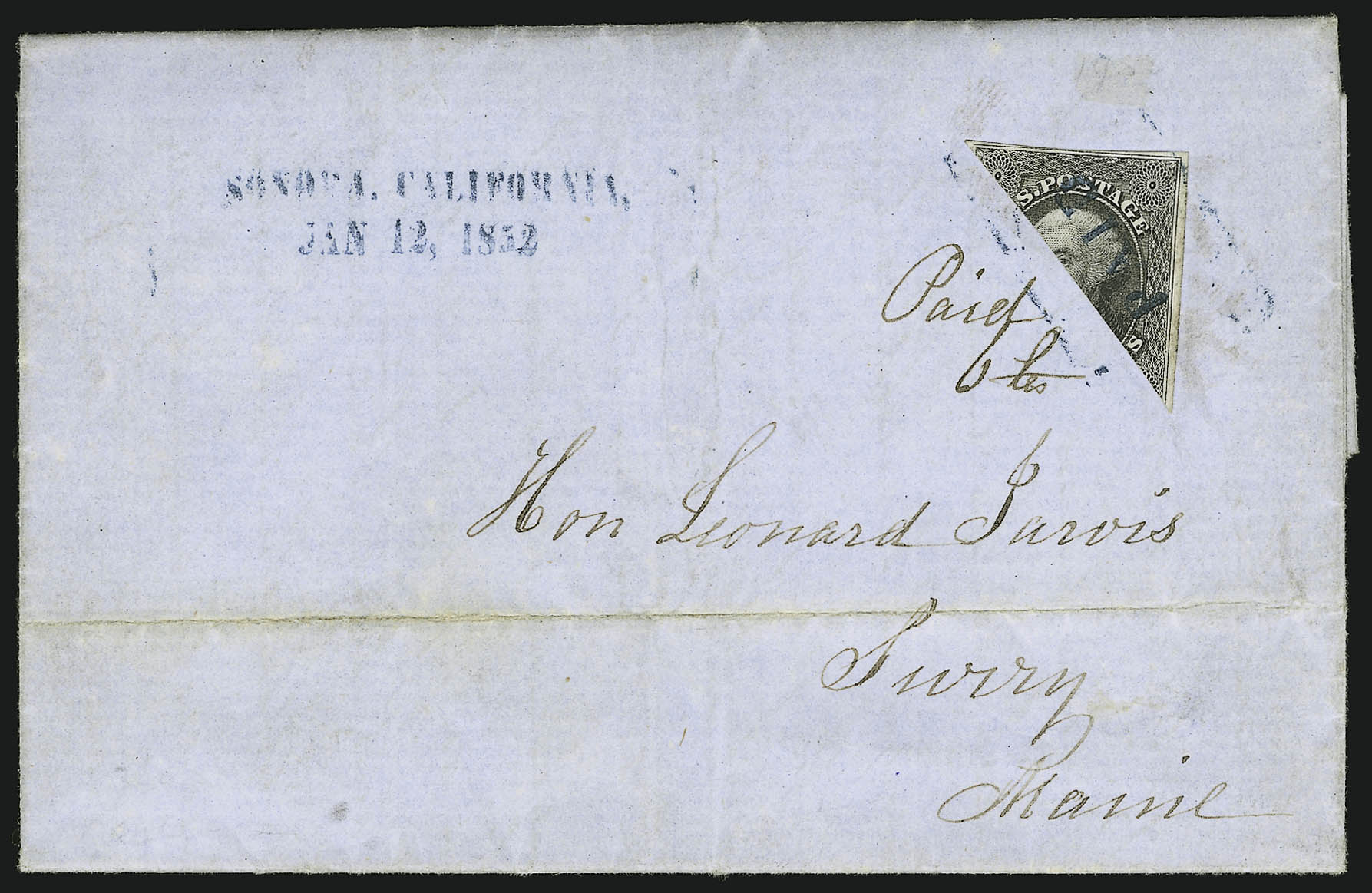
United States 1851, provisional or unofficial diagonal bisect of 12 cent stamp used as 6 cents

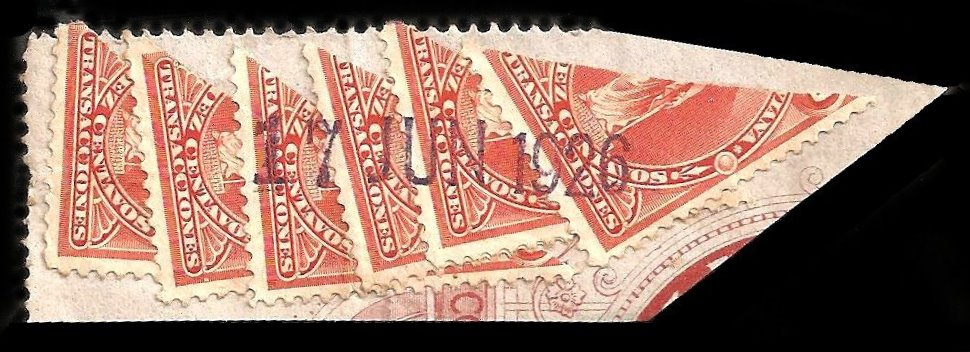
Revenue stamps of Bolivia bisected on a fragment of a 1926 document

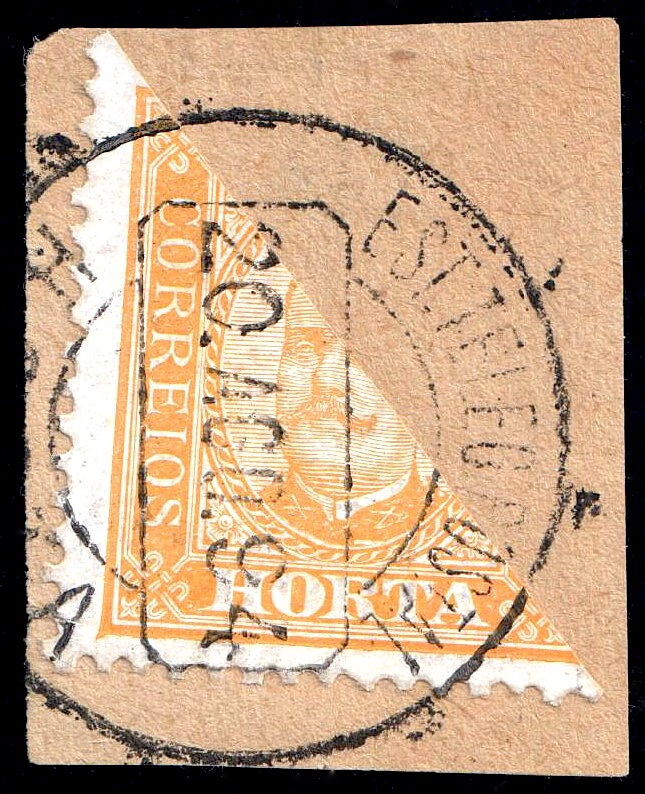
Horta 1894, 5 reales bisected for use as 2.5 reales

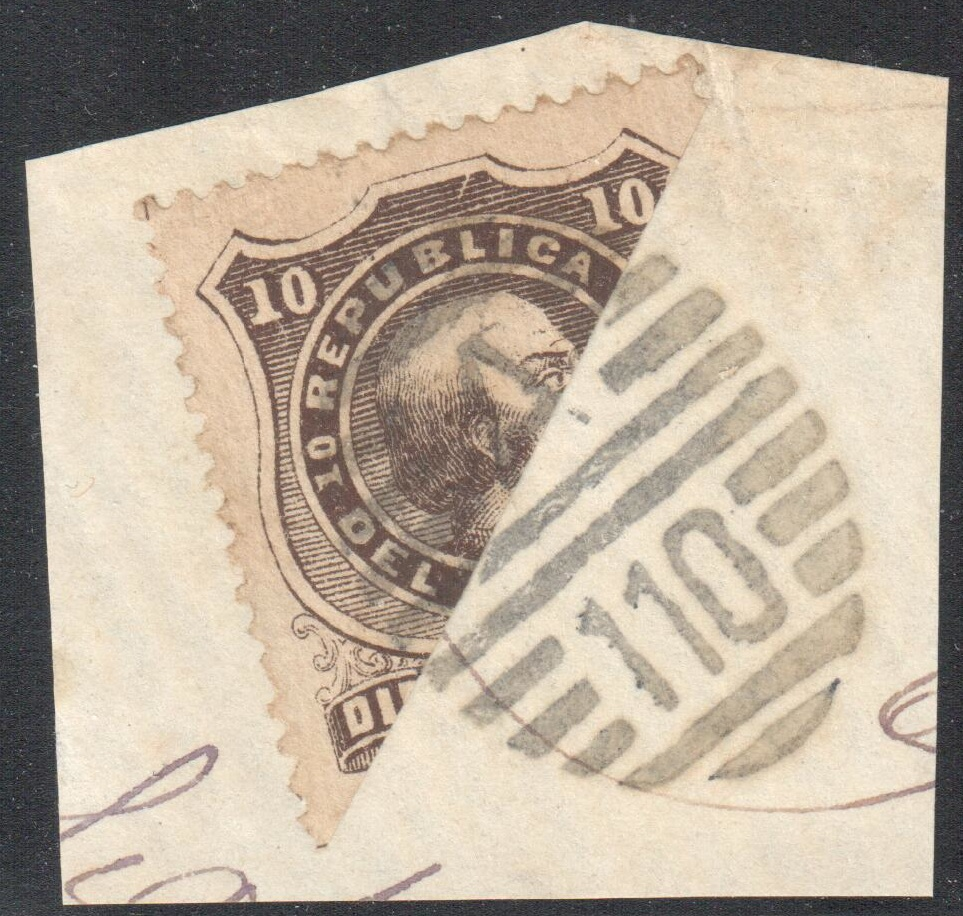
Uruguay 1883, 10 centimos bisected for use as 5 centimos
