= Anna Führing =

German actress

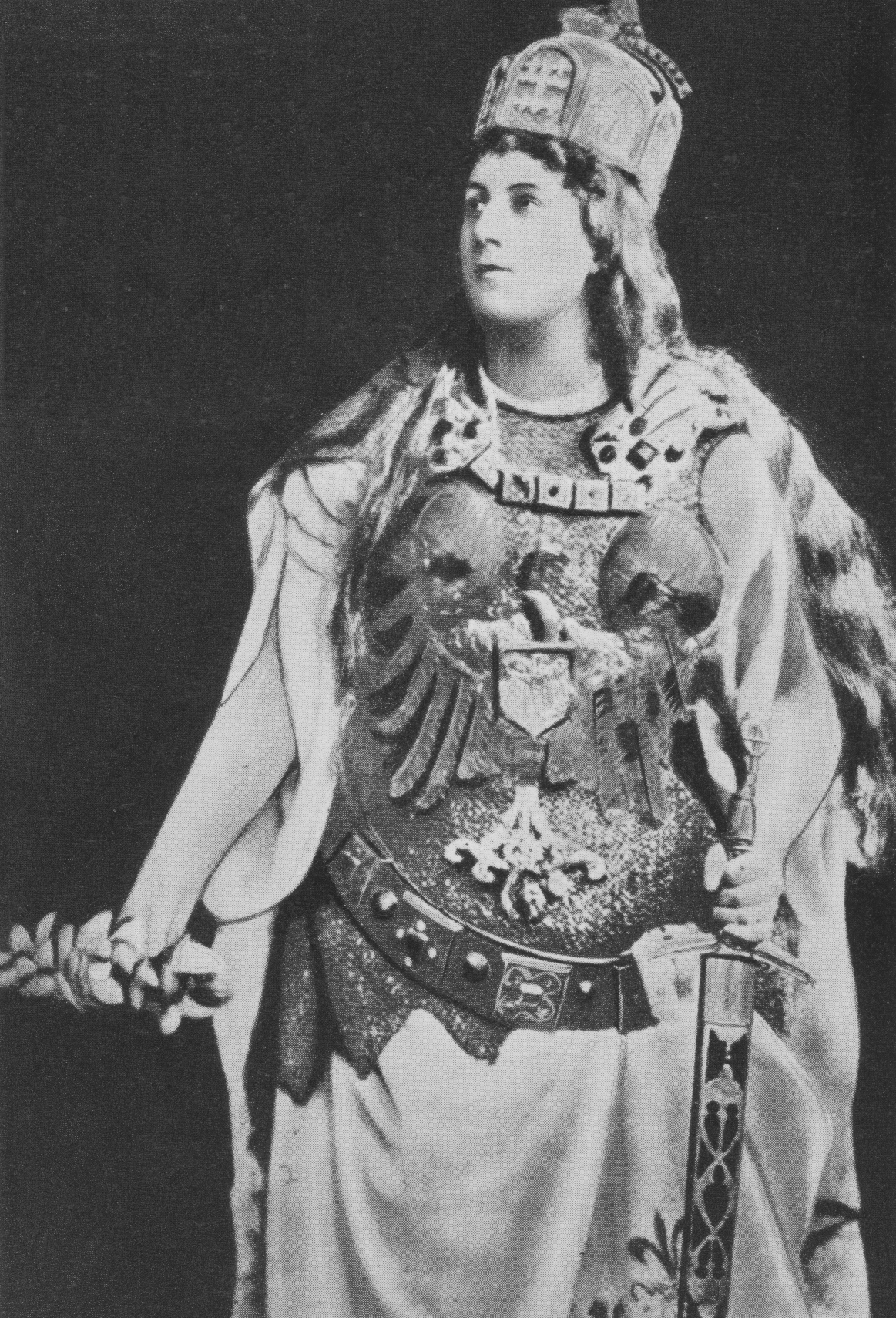
- Born: Anna Führing; 6 March 1866; Hamburg, Free and Hanseatic City of Hamburg
- Died: 2 November 1929 (aged 63); Berlin, Germany
- Occupations: Actress, model

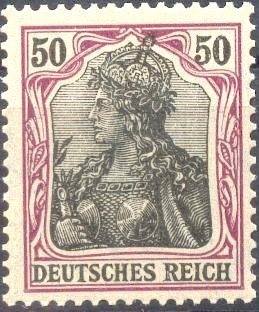
Germania stamp

Anna Führing (German: [ˈana ˈfyːʁɪŋ]; 1866–1929) was a German actress. She is, however, more famous as the model for the Germania stamp of the Reichspost.

== Life and career ==
Anna Führing was born in Hamburg on 6 March 1866, as the daughter of the theatre and restaurant owner Carl Führing. In Berlin she received her education in acting. Frequently she represented on stage the figure of Germania, as for instance at a festival in Düsseldorf in 1891 when Kaiser Wilhelm II was in attendance. In 1892, when the Theater am Schiffbauerdamm in Berlin was inaugurated, Führing played the role of Iphigenie. With the rise of the silent films, Führing took on roles in the new medium.

Führing was the model for engraver Paul Eduard Waldraff who designed the Germania series of definitive stamps that were first issued in 1900 and continued in use for 22 years. She is depicted wearing an octagonal imperial crown, holding a sword and an olive branch The Art Nouveau design was personally chosen by the Kaiser Wilhelm II.

In 1899, she married Ferdinand von Strantz, the Director of the Hofoper of Berlin and 45 years her senior. She henceforth carried the title Baronin Anna von Strantz-Führing; the couple had one daughter. Führing died in Berlin on 2 November 1929.

== Filmography ==
- Hausdame aus bester Familie gesucht (1915, as Anna von Strantz-Führing)
- Ein Held des Unterseebootes (1915, as Anna von Strantz-Führing)
- Nacht und Morgen (1916)
- The Wonderful Adventure (1924)
- Eine kleine Freundin braucht ein jeder Mann (1927)
- Ossi hat die Hosen an (1928, as Baronin Strantz-Führing)

== Literature ==
- Thinius, Carl (1975). Damals in St. Pauli: Lust und Freude in der Vorstadt. Hamburg: Verlag Hans Christians. ISBN 978-3-7672-0368-6.
