= Forerunner (stamp) =

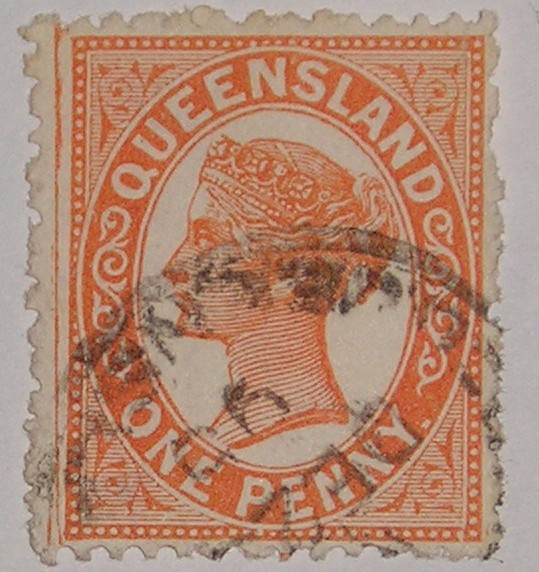
This stamp from the Australian state of Queensland is a forerunner to the stamps of modern Australia.

In philately, a forerunner is a postage stamp used before a region or territory issued stamps of its own. The term also includes stamps of the political predecessors of a country. For instance stamps of the state of Western Australia are forerunners of Australia today and stamps of the British Mandate for Palestine are forerunners of modern Israel.

== British colonies ==
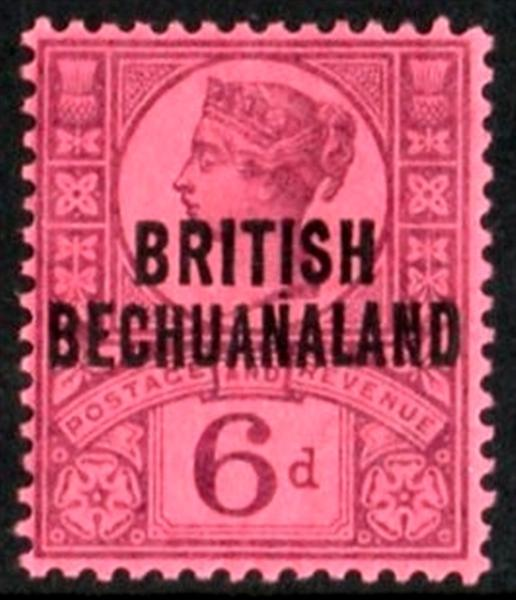
This British stamp is overprinted for use in British Bechuanaland which eventually became part of South Africa.

Many British colonies used British stamps overprinted with the name of the colony, for instance Bechuanaland Protectorate or Cyprus, before those territories had their own stamps and those overprinted stamps are forerunners. Stamps of Britain used abroad but not marked for the specific use in a colony may also be regarded as forerunners if their use in a colony can be identified by the postmark, for example an A25 postmark shows that a stamp was used in Malta.

== Propaganda stamps ==
Although the term 'forerunner' is normally restricted to stamps which are official issues of a territory, some "stamps" issued by political movements such as Sinn Féin (Ireland) or the Jewish National Fund (Israel) have been regarded as forerunners despite not being valid for postal use.

== Provisional stamps ==
Provisional stamps produced by overprinting are official stamps of a country, even if old stamps are used, and thus are not considered to be forerunners.

== See also ==
Forerunners at Postage stamps of Ireland
