= Judeo-Urdu =

Urdu dialect of Indian Jews

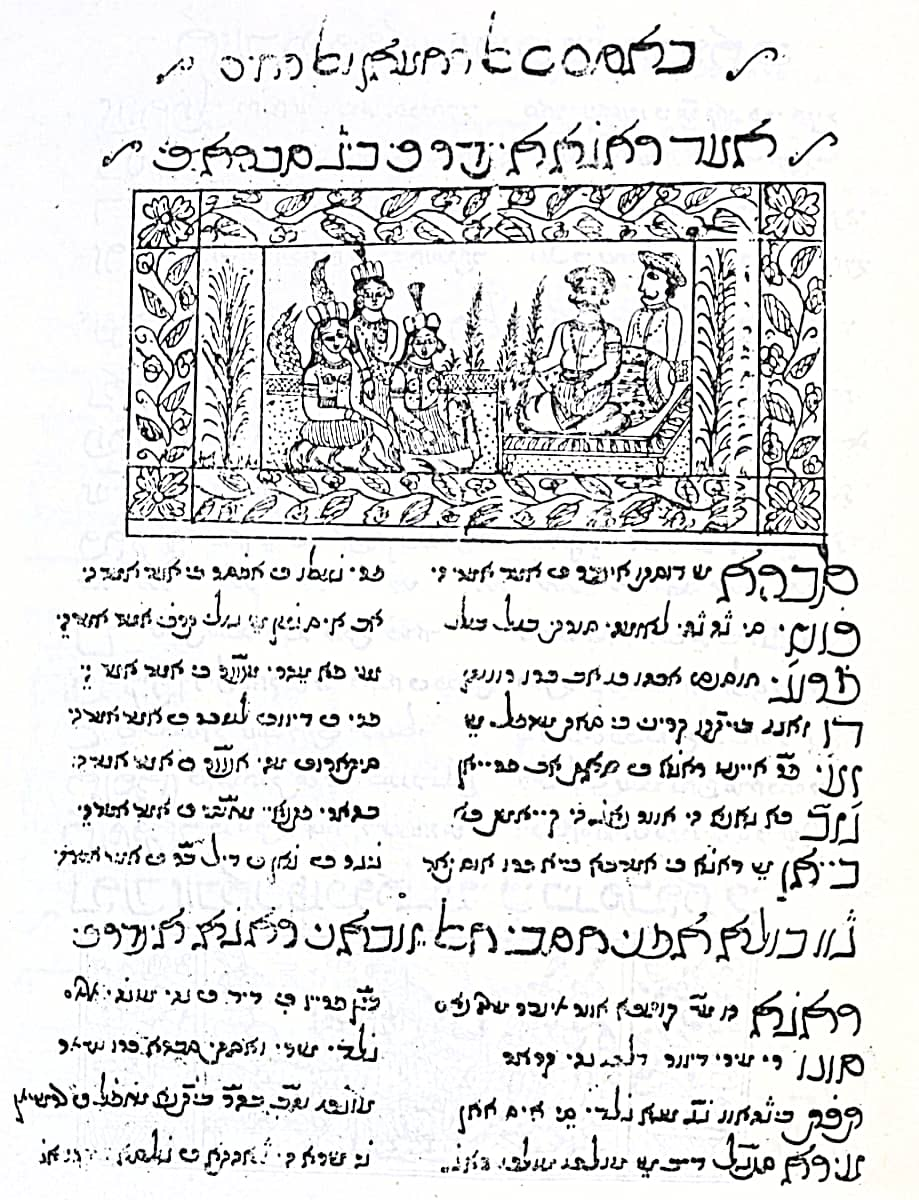
- Inder Sabha in Judeo-Urdu
- Native to: Indian subcontinent
- Region: Bombay, Calcutta
- Ethnicity: Baghdadi Jews
- Era: 18th century
- Language family: Indo-European: Indo-Iranian; Indo-Aryan; Central; Western Hindi; Hindustani; Urdu; Judeo-Urdu
- Writing system: Hebrew script

Language codes
- ISO 639-3: –
- Glottolog: jude1269
- IETF: ur-IN-Hebr

Urdu literature اردو ادب
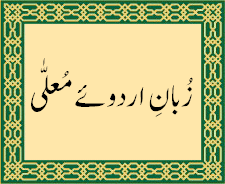

Urdu literature
- By category Urdu language Rekhta

Major figures
- Amir Khusrau - Wali Dakhani - Mir Taqi Mir - Ghalib - Abdul Haq - Muhammad Iqbal

Urdu writers
- Writers – Novelists – Poets

Forms
- Ghazal - Dastangoi - Nazm – Fiction

Institutions
- Anjuman-i Taraqqi-i Urdu; Urdu movement Literary Prizes

Judeo-Urdu (Urdu: یہود اردو, romanized: yahūd urdū; Hebrew: אורדו יהודית, romanized: ūrdū yehūdīt) was a dialect of the Urdu language spoken by the Baghdadi Jews in the Indian subcontinent living in the areas of Mumbai and Kolkata towards the end of the 18th century. It is a dialect that was written in the Hebrew script and found to be used for several pieces of literature, such as Inder Sabha, a copy of which is kept at the British Library.

== Writing system ==
The Judeo-Urdu dialect was written in the Hebrew script. The orthography is one of the primary reasons for this dialect being associated with Urdu, rather than Hindi, as the spelling of lemmas found in literature written in the Judeo-Urdu dialect seem to correlate with the Perso-Arab spelling. For instance, Arabic loanwords which contain the letters ط would be mapped to the Hebrew equivalent ט, a pattern which is consistent with other loanwords and loan-letters.

However, the representation of unique sounds found in Indo-Aryan languages, such as retroflex consonants as well as aspirated consonants, were not represented by unique or modified Hebrew letters. Rather, alveolar consonants were also used to represent these sounds paired with a Dagesh or Holam. This could create ambiguity as some letters, like Dalet, could denote up to four different phonemes, while an unvocalised Gimel could denote potentially up to five.

== Vocabulary ==
Example of words used in Judeo-Urdu
Standard Urdu	Judeo-Urdu	Meaning	Hebrew equivalent
اُون٘ٹ (ūṉṭ)	אוּנְתּ (ūnṭ)	'camel'	גָּמָל (gámál)
بَکْری (bakrī)	בַכְּרי (bakrī)	'goat'	עֵז ('ēz)
پَتَّھر (patthar)	פַתַּר (pattʰar)	'stone'	אֶבֶן (évén)
گَدھا (gadhā)	גַּדָּא (gadʱā)	'donkey'	חֲמוֹר (ḥämōr)
جانْوَر (jānvar)	גַֹנָאוַור (janāvar) (Note: Dialectal form جَناوَر, which corresponds with Marathi: जनावर, j̈anāvar)	'animal'	בְּהֵמָה (bhemáh)
چُوہَا (čūhā)	גַווָא (čawā) (Note: Dialectal form چُوَا, which corresponds with Marathi: चुवा, ċuvā)	'mouse'	עַכְבָּר ('aḵbár)
حَلق (ḥalaq)	חָלַק (ḥálaq)	'throat'	גָרוֹן (gárōn)
کُتّا (kuttā)	כוּתָּא (kūttā)	'dog'	כֶּלֶב (kélév)
لَکْڑی (lakṛī)	לַכּרִי (lakrī)	'wood'	עֵץ ('ēṣ)
مُرْغِی (murḡī)	מוּרְגִי (mūrġī)	'hen'	תַּרְנְגֹלֶת (tarngolét)

== See also ==
- Judeo-Marathi
- Jewish languages
