= Adaab =

Greeting gesture traditionally used by Muslims of South Asia

Urdu literature اردو ادب
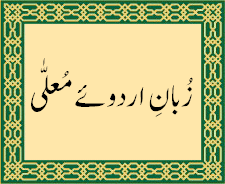

Urdu literature
- By category Urdu language Rekhta

Major figures
- Amir Khusrau - Wali Dakhani - Mir Taqi Mir - Ghalib - Abdul Haq - Muhammad Iqbal

Urdu writers
- Writers – Novelists – Poets

Forms
- Ghazal - Dastangoi - Nazm – Fiction

Institutions
- Anjuman-i Taraqqi-i Urdu; Urdu movement Literary Prizes

Ādāb (Urdu: آداب), from the Arabic word Aadaab (آداب), meaning respect and politeness, is a hand gesture used in the Indian subcontinent, by the Urdu-speaking while greeting. It involves raising the right hand in front of the eyes with palm inwards, while the upper torso is bent forward.

The gesture is associated with the Ganga-Jamuni culture of South Asia, especially of the Urdu-speaking communities of Uttar Pradesh, Hyderabadi Muslims, and Muhajir people of Pakistan.

== History ==
Since the religious greeting of Muslims i.e. "Assalamu Alaikum" was interpreted by some in India to be for Muslims only, and Muslims in India lived in a multi-faith and a multi-lingual society, this alternative form of greeting was coined. Its use became so pervasive in the high culture of northern and central India that it was not considered inappropriate to reply to 'salaam' with 'aadaab' and vice versa and it was used frequently in non-Muslim households as well. The use of Aadab is especially popular in the Indian city of Hyderabad, where religious pluralism has been historically emphasized; the Nizam of the region stated: "Hindus and Muslims are like my two eyes ... How can I favor one eye over the other?" In some localities of India and Pakistan, the phrase and gesture has decreased in use because it is perceived as insufficiently Islamic compared to other greetings, though it is preferred by many who still use it due to its inclusive nature.

== Description ==
The gesture involves raising the right hand towards the face with palm inwards such that it is in front of the eyes and the finger tips are almost touching the forehead, as the upper torso is bent forward. It is typical for the person to say "ādāb arz hai" (آداب عرض ہے), meaning "I convey greetings [to thee]", or simply just "aadab". It is often answered with the same or the word "taslīm" is said as an answer or sometimes it is answered with a facial gesture of acceptance.

In popular culture today, the adab is often associated with the courtly culture of the Muslim Nawabs.

== See also ==
- Civilian salutes
- Greetings
- Hindu–Muslim unity
