= The Poet of Poets =

Poet of Poets or The Poet of Poets is an epitheton ornans regularly used for a number of poets, including:

- Miguel de Cervantes (1547–1616), sometimes anglicized as Michael Cervantes, a Spanish writer who is widely regarded as the greatest writer in the Spanish language and one of the world's pre-eminent novelists
- Ghalib (1797–1869), the preeminent Urdu and Persian-language poet during the last years of the Mughal Empire
- Friedrich Hölderlin (1770–1843), major German lyric poet, commonly associated with the artistic movement known as Romanticism
- Homer, best known as the author of the Iliad and the Odyssey. He was believed by the ancient Greeks to have been the first and greatest of the epic poets. Author of the first known literature of Europe, he is central to the Western canon
- John the Evangelist (15–?), name traditionally given to the author of the Gospel of John. Christians have traditionally identified him with John the Apostle, John of Patmos, and John the Presbyter, though this has been disputed by modern scholars
- Orpheus, a legendary musician, poet, and prophet in ancient Greek religion and myth
- Petrarch (1304–1374), Italian scholar and poet in Renaissance Italy, and one of the earliest humanists
- Percy Bysshe Shelley (1792–1822), one of the major English Romantic poets, and is regarded by some as among the finest lyric, as well as epic, poets in the English language
- Edmund Spenser (1550s–1599), English poet best known for The Faerie Queene, an epic poem and fantastical allegory celebrating the Tudor dynasty and Elizabeth I
- W. B. Yeats (1865–1939), Irish poet and one of the foremost figures of 20th-century literature
