= Jamiluddin Aali =

Pakistani poet, writer, and scholar (1926–2015)

- Born: Nawabzada Mirza Jamiluddin Ahmed Khan; 20 January 1925; Delhi, British India
- Died: 23 November 2015 (aged 90); Karachi, Pakistan
- Resting place: Bizerta Lines, Karachi
- Education: Anglo Arabic College; University of Karachi
- Occupations: Poet; songwriter; critic; playwright; essayist; columnist; scholar
- Spouse: Tayaba Bano (m. 1944)
- Children: 5
- Awards: Pride of Performance in 1991; Hilal-i-Imtiaz (Crescent of Excellence) Award in 2004

Nawabzada Mirza Jamiluddin Ahmed Khan PP, HI (20 January 1925 – 23 November 2015; Urdu: نوابزادہ مرزا جمیل الدین احمد خان), also known as Jamiluddin Aali or Aaliji, was a Pakistani poet, critic, playwright, essayist, columnist, and scholar.

== Early life and career ==
Nawabzada Mirza Jamiluddin Ahmed Khan was born in Delhi, British India, on 20 January 1925. His father Amiruddin Ahmed Khan was the Nawab of Loharu and his mother Syeda Jamila Begum was a direct descendant of Khwaja Mir Dard and was the fourth wife of Amiruddin Khan. His paternal grandfather was a disciple of Mirza Ghalib, who is regarded as one of the greatest poets of Urdu language. Aali earned a BA in Economics from Anglo Arabic College, Delhi in 1944.

In 1947, just before the partition of India, Aali migrated to Karachi (later part of Pakistan) on 13 August with his family and started his career as an assistant in the Ministry of Commerce. In 1951, he passed the CSS (civil service of Pakistan) examination and joined the Pakistan Taxation Service. He was also the Officer on Special Duty at President House from 1959 to 1963. Aali joined the National Bank of Pakistan in 1967 and remained its vice president until his retirement in 1988. In 1971, he obtained an FEL and LLB (law) degree from the University of Karachi.

Jamiluddin Aali was also a former member of the Pakistan Peoples Party and was compelled to contest the 1977 National Assembly elections from NA-191, but lost to Munawwar Hasan of Jamaat-e-Islami. In 1997, Aali was elected as a member of the Senate for a six-year term with support from the Muttahida Qaumi Movement.

Jamiluddin Aali was never very clear nor comfortable answering the question as to why he drifted briefly into politics.

Aali started composing poetry at an early age and wrote many books as well as songs. He wrote the song "Jeevay Jeevay Pakistan" during the 1965 Indo-Pak war which became highly popular. The song was sung by Shahnaz Begum with music arranged by Sohail Rana and was originally released on 14 August 1971 by PTV. During International Women's Year (1976), Aali wrote the song "Hum Maain, Hum Behnain, Hum Baitiyan". He wrote the song "Jo Nam Wohi Pehchan, Pakistan, Pakistan" at the request of former Pakistani President Ghulam Ishaq Khan in 1986. He also wrote the song "Mera Inam Pakistan" that was sung by Nusrat Fateh Ali Khan.

== Personal life ==
Aali married Tayyba Bano in 1944. He had three sons and two daughters; one of his sons is Zulqarnain Jamil Aali, popularly known as Raju Jamil, an actor and banker.

== Death ==
Aali died of a heart attack on 23 November 2015 in Karachi. His funeral prayer (Namaz-e-Janazah) was held in the mosque "Tooba" in DHA, Karachi. He was buried in an army graveyard at Bizerta Lines, Karachi on 23 November 2015.

== Literary work and activities ==
Aali became honorary secretary of the Anjuman-i Taraqqi-i Urdu (Association for the Promotion of Urdu Language) in 1962 after the death of Maulvi Abdul Haq (known as Baba-e-Urdu lit. 'Father of Urdu', for his contributions for the promotion of Urdu language) and played a key role there for many years, along with Farman Fatehpuri, to ensure that the association survives and grows.

Aali could also be given credit for playing a major role at the Urdu Lughat Board (Urdu Dictionary Board) when this 22-volume Urdu dictionary was being developed in Pakistan.

Ballads collection

- Aye Mere Dasht-e-Sukhan
- Ghazlain Dohay Geet (six editions)
- Jeeway Jeeway Pakistan (five editions)
- La Hasil (three editions)
- Nai Kiran

Couplets collection

- Dohay (three editions in Urdu and one in Devnagari)

Aali showed his real potential and creativity in his dohas.

Travel literature

- Duniya Mere Aagye
- Tamasha Mere Aagye
- Iceland (a travelogue of Iceland)
- Hurfay (four books)

== Songs ==
- "Aye Watan Ke Sajelay Jawanoo" (اے وطن کے سجیلے جوانوں) (sung originally by Noor Jehan during the 1965 war between India and Pakistan)
- "Jeevay Jeevay Pakistan" (جیوے جیوے پاکستان) (sung by Shahnaz Begum originally in 1968, released by PTV on 14 August 1971)
- "Hum Mustafavi Mustafavi Hain" (ہم مصطفوی مصطفوی ہیں) (official song of 1974 Islamic Summit Conference at Lahore), Pakistan (1974)
- "Mein Chota Sa Ek Larka Hoon" (میں چھوٹا سا ایک لڑکا ہوں)
- "Mera Paigham Pakistan" (میرا پیغام پاکستان) (sung by Nusrat Fateh Ali Khan) (1996)
- "Ab Yeh Andaz-e-Anjuman Hoga" (اب یہ اندازِ انجمن ہوگا)
- "Hum Maain, Hum Behnain, Hum Baitiyan" (ہم مائیں، ہم بہنیں، ہم بیٹیاں) (1976)
- "Jo Naam Wahi Pehchan, Pakistan Pakistan" (جو نام وہی پہچان، پاکستان پاکستان) (1986)
- "Aye Des Ki Hawaao, Kushboo Mein Bas Ke Jao" (اے دیس کی ہواؤں، خوشبو میں بس کے جاؤ) (1972)
- "Itne Bare Jewan Sagar Mein, Tu Ne Pakistan Diya" (اتنے بڑے جیون ساگر میں تو نے پاکستان دیا) (sung by folk singer Allan Faqir)
- "Yeh Kavita Pakistani Hai" (یہ کویتا پاکستانی ہے) (sung by Nighat Seema)

== Awards ==
- Hilal-e-Imtiaz (Crescent of Excellence) Award (2004) by the President of Pakistan
- Pride of Performance (1991) by the President of Pakistan
- Adamjee Literary Award (1960)
- Dawood Literary Award (1963)
- United Bank Literary Award (1965)
- Habib Bank Literary Award (1965)
- Canadian Urdu Academy Award (1988)
- Sant Kabeer Award – Urdu Conference Delhi (1989)
- Urdu Markaz New York "Nishan-e-Urdu" Award, in the First International Urdu Conference at UNO on 24 June 2000.

== See also ==
- Hafeez Jalandhari, a renowned Urdu poet, is credited as the writer of Pakistan's national anthem.
