= Abdul Haq (Urdu scholar) =

Urdu linguist and scholar (1870–1961)

Baba-e-Urdu Maulvi Abdul Haq
- مولوی عبد الحق
- Maulvi Abdul Haq at the headquarters of Radio Pakistan
- Born: 20 April 1870; Hapur, North-Western Provinces, British India
- Died: 16 August 1961 (aged 91); Karachi, Sindh, Pakistan
- Resting place: Federal Urdu University (Abdul-Haq campus), Karachi
- Occupations: Researcher, scholar and a literary critic
- Era: 20th century
- Organization: Anjuman-i Taraqqi-i Urdu
- Known for: Compiling a Standard English-Urdu Dictionary and a lifetime dedication to the promotion of Urdu language
- Title: Baba-e-Urdu (lit. 'Father of Urdu')

Signature
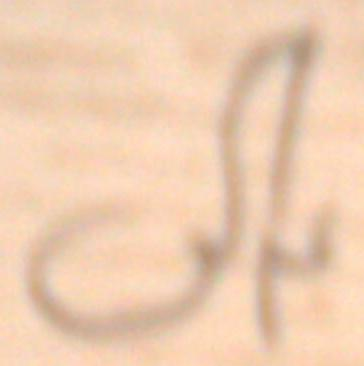

Urdu literature اردو ادب
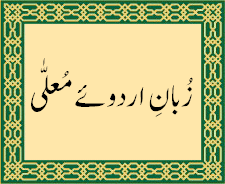

Urdu literature
- By category Urdu language Rekhta

Major figures
- Amir Khusrau - Wali Dakhani - Mir Taqi Mir - Ghalib - Abdul Haq - Muhammad Iqbal

Urdu writers
- Writers – Novelists – Poets

Forms
- Ghazal - Dastangoi - Nazm – Fiction

Institutions
- Anjuman-i Taraqqi-i Urdu; Urdu movement Literary Prizes

Abdul Haq (Note: Urdu: عبد الحق) (20 April 1870 – 16 August 1961) was a Pakistani Urdu linguist and scholar. Often known as Baba-e-Urdu (Urdu: بابائے اردو, Father of Urdu), he is credited for the development and promotion of Urdu language in 20th century. He is known for demanding Urdu to be made the national language of Pakistan.

== Early life ==
He was deeply influenced by Sir Syed Ahmad Khan's political and social views, and, following his wishes, learned English and scientific subjects. Like Syed Ahmad Khan, Abdul Haq saw Urdu as a major cultural and political influence on the lives and identity of the Muslims of the Indian subcontinent.

In the same year, he was appointed secretary of the All India Muhammadan Educational Conference, which had been founded by Sir Syed in 1886 for the promotion of education and intellectualism in Muslim society. Sir Syed founded the Anjuman Taraqqi-i-Urdu in 1886 in Aligarh with Thomas Walker Arnold as its first president and Shibli Nomani as the first secretary. In 1912 Haq was appointed as the secretary of the Anjuman. Under him, the organization flourished and published a number of magazines, notably Urdu, launched in January 1921, Science, in 1928, and Hamari Zaban (ہماری زبان; lit "Our Language"), in 1939. During this period he also served as the Principal of Osmania College (Aurangabad) and retired from that position in 1930.

== Educational and political activities ==
Haq was a scholarly critic who provided criticisms of modern Urdu works and encouraged his students to develop literary skills and appreciation of Urdu. Following his retirement from Osmania University in 1930, Haq worked to compile and edit a comprehensive and authoritative English-Urdu dictionary.

== In Pakistan ==
In 1948, Haq migrated to Pakistan. In the wake of migration and the accompanying riots in 1947, much of his property, especially valuable manuscripts, papers and books were lost. However, some of the material which he brought to Pakistan is kept in the Urdu Dictionary Board library.

The ordeals of partition and the migration also adversely affected Abdul Haq's health. He re-organised the Anjuman Taraqqi-e-Urdu in Karachi, launching journals, establishing libraries and schools, publishing a large number of books and promoting education in the Urdu language and linguistic research in it. Abdul Haq's work especially helped preserve the distinct "Old Urdu" linguistic and literary traditions of Hyderabad, known as Hyderabadi Urdu. He also used his organisation for political activism, promoting the adoption of Urdu as the lingua franca and sole official language of Pakistan.

== Death ==
Despite illnesses and failing health, Haq continued to promote the active use of Urdu as a medium for all educational activities. He pushed for the creation of an Urdu College in Karachi, the adoption of Urdu as a medium of instruction for all subjects in educational institutions and worked to organise a national Urdu conference in 1959. Suffering from cancer, he died after a prolonged period of incapacitation on 16 August 1961 in Karachi.

== Baba-e-Urdu's publications ==
For his achievements in the development and promotion of Urdu literature, he is officially regarded as Baba-e-Urdu. His best known works include the English-Urdu dictionary, Chand Ham Asar:چند ہم عصر, Maktoobat: مکتوبات, Muqaddimatمقدمات, Tauqeedat, Qawaid-e-Urdu:قوائد اردو and Debacha Dastan Rani Ketki. The Anjuman Taraqqi-e-Urdu remains an important intellectual organisation in Pakistan. Held in high esteem amongst the intellectuals, educationalists and scholars in Pakistan, Haq is praised for his work in promoting Muslim heritage and Urdu as a unifying medium for Pakistani Muslims.

== Commemorative postage stamp issued in 2004 ==
In recognition of his services to Urdu literature, Pakistan Post issued a Commemorative stamp in his honor on 16 August 2004 in its 'Men of Letters' series.

== See also ==
- Jamiluddin Aali
- Sahar Ansari
- Josh Malihabadi
- Anjuman-i Taraqqi-i Urdu
