= Urdu propagation movement =

Sociopolitical and linguistic movement in British India

Urdu literature اردو ادب
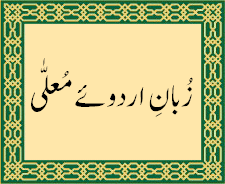

Urdu literature
- By category Urdu language Rekhta

Major figures
- Amir Khusrau - Wali Dakhani - Mir Taqi Mir - Ghalib - Abdul Haq - Muhammad Iqbal

Urdu writers
- Writers – Novelists – Poets

Forms
- Ghazal - Dastangoi - Nazm – Fiction

Institutions
- Anjuman-i Taraqqi-i Urdu; Urdu movement Literary Prizes

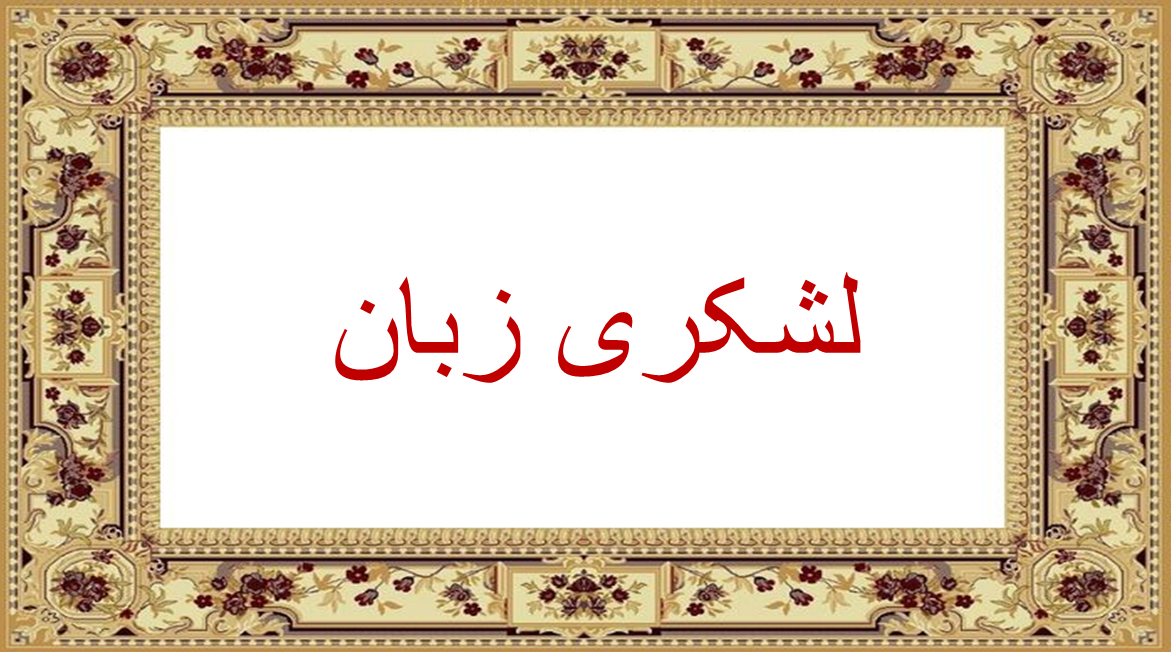
Lashkari Zaban ("Battalionese language") title in Nastaliq script.

The Urdu propagation movement was a sociopolitical and linguistic movement aimed at the propagation of the Urdu language as the lingua franca and symbol of the cultural identity of the Muslim communities of the Indian subcontinent during the British Raj.

The movement began with the fall of the Mughal Empire in the mid-19th century, fuelled by the Aligarh movement of Sir Syed Ahmed Khan. It strongly influenced the All India Muslim League and the Pakistan movement.

== Hindi-Urdu controversy ==
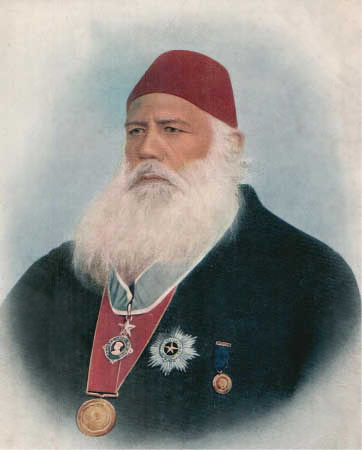
Sir Syed in his later years, wearing official decorations.

The Hindi-Urdu controversy arose in 1867 when the British government prepared to accept the demand of the Hindu communities of the United Provinces (now Uttar Pradesh) and Bihar to change the Perso-Arabic script of the official language to Devanagari and adopt Hindi as the second official language on demand of Hindi activists. Muslim politician Sir Syed Ahmed Khan became the most vocal opponent of this change. He viewed Urdu as the lingua franca of Muslims. Having been developed by the ruling Mughal Empire, what became known as Urdu was used as a secondary language to Persian, the official language of the Mughal court. Since the decline of the Mughal dynasty, Sir Syed promoted the use of Urdu through his writings. Under Sir Syed, the Scientific Society of Aligarh translated Western works only into Urdu. Sir Syed considered Urdu "a common legacy of Hindus and Muslims." The schools established by Sir Syed imparted education in the Urdu-medium.

The demand for Hindi, led largely by Hindus, was to Sir Syed an erosion of the centuries-old Muslim cultural domination of India. Testifying before the British-appointed education commission, Sir Syed controversially exclaimed that "Urdu was the language of gentry and people of high social standing, whereas Hindi was to be vulgar." His remarks provoked a hostile response from Hindu leaders and advocates of Hindi." The Hindus unified across the region to demand the recognition of Hindi. The Hindi movement's success led Sir Syed to advocate Urdu further as the symbol of Muslim heritage and as the language of the Muslim intellectual and political class. His educational and political work grew increasingly centred on and exclusively for Muslim interests. He also sought to persuade the British to give it extensive official use and patronage.

== Urdu in Muslim politics ==
Sir Syed's call for Indian Muslims to adopt Urdu won extensive support from the Aligarh Movement and Muslim religious activists. Muslim religious and political leaders Mohsin-ul-Mulk and Maulvi Abdul Haq developed organisations such as the Urdu Defence Association and the Anjuman Taraqqi-i-Urdu, committed to perpetuating Urdu. Sir Syed's protege, Shibli Nomani, led efforts to adopt Urdu as the official language of the Hyderabad State and as the medium of instruction at Osmania University. This political campaign was criticised for making the use of Urdu a political issue that served as a wedge between Muslims and Hindus, who saw Sir Syed's advocacy as an effort to re-establish Muslim hegemony. To Muslims in northern and western India, Urdu became an integral part of political identity and communal separatism. The division over the use of Hindi or Urdu would further fuel communal conflict between Muslims and Hindus in India. The All India Muslim League and the Jamaat-e-Islami projected Urdu as essential for the political and cultural survival of Islamic society in India. Muslim politicians like Muhammad Ali Jinnah, Sir Muhammad Iqbal, and Liaquat Ali Khan emphasised Urdu as the symbol of Muslim heritage and political identity. The political cause of Urdu became a core issue at the heart of the Two-Nation Theory, which advocated that Muslims and Hindus were irreconcilably separate nations. Advocates of the Pakistan movement sought to make Urdu a key argument in drawing distinctions with India's Hindu-majority population. Muslim religious leaders such as Maulana Mohammad Ali, Maulana Shaukat Ali, and Maulana Maududi emphasised the knowledge of Urdu as essential for ordinary and religious Muslims.

== Urdu in Pakistan and India ==
In Pakistan, Urdu is the National language and the Lingua franca, while English is one of the state's official languages of the state. However, this policy caused considerable political turmoil in East Bengal, which was home to the Bengali-speaking population, which constituted the majority of Pakistan's population. Jinnah, most West Pakistani politicians emphasised that only Urdu would be recognised officially. This intensified the cultural and political gulf between West Pakistan and East Pakistan. The East Pakistan Awami Muslim League (the predecessor of the Awami League), established by A. K. Fazlul Huq, Huseyn Shaheed Suhrawardy, and Sheikh Mujibur Rahman in 1949, would lead the demand for the recognition of Bengali. Intensifying protests and strikes led by political groups, unions, and student groups would lead to the imposition of martial law. The killing of protesting students by police in 1952 triggered a massive wave of protests in the province, which would come to be known as the Bengali language movement. Although politicians like Khawaja Nazimuddin supported the cause of Urdu, a vast majority of Bengali nationalists saw the government policy as a symbol of racial discrimination. This wedge in Pakistani society would ultimately lead to the Bangladesh Liberation War and the establishment of Bangladesh in 1971.

Independent India adopted Urdu as one of its 22 scheduled languages, although its counterpart, Hindi, enjoys official language status. Urdu is also officially recognised by the states of Jammu and Kashmir, Uttar Pradesh, Telangana, Bihar, and Delhi. Indian Muslims across the country widely use Urdu, and there are a large number of Urdu-medium schools, colleges, and universities, including madrassahs, the Jamia Millia Islamia, and the Aligarh Muslim University. Urdu is also a part of popular culture, media, and publications. Numerous Urdu language films have been produced, which include Umrao Jaan, Shatranj Ke Khiladi, and Pakeezah. Many films in India that are labelled as Hindi are still heavily influenced by Urdu, especially in their dialogues and songs.

Despite being given the status of a scheduled language, there have been concerns that the Urdu language has largely declined in India. This decline has been attributed to reasons such as lack of promotional policies by central language regulation boards, the promulgation and preference of Urdu's counterpart Hindi as the Indian Union's official language since 1950, the higher number of Hindi-speakers in India leading to the suppression of Urdu, the partition of India and Urdu's national language status in Pakistan overshadowing the language's prospects in India, as well as the lack of many schools in India teaching Urdu as a medium of instruction.
