= Wali Mohammed Wali =

Indian poet (1667–1707)

Wali Muhammad Wali
- Born: 1667; Aurangabad
- Died: 1707 (aged 39–40); Ahmedabad
- Occupation: Poet
- Writing career
- Pen name: Wali Dakhani, Wali Aurangabadi, Wali Gujarati
- Period: Mughal period
- Genres: Ghazal, masnavi, qasida, mukhammas

Urdu literature اُرْدُو اَدَبْ
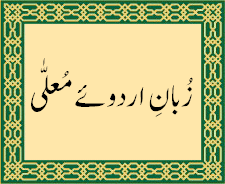

Urdu literature
- By category Urdu language Rekhta

Major figures
- Amir Khusrau - Wali Dakhani - Mir Taqi Mir - Ghalib - Abdul Haq - Muhammad Iqbal

Urdu writers
- Writers – Novelists – Poets

Forms
- Ghazal - Dastangoi - Nazm – Fiction

Institutions
- Anjuman-i Taraqqi-i Urdu; Urdu movement Literary Prizes

Wali Muhammad Wali (1667–1707), also known as Wali Dakhani, Wali Gujarati, and Wali Aurangabadi, was a classical Urdu poet from the Indian subcontinent.

He is considered by many scholars to be the father of Urdu poetry, being the first established poet to have composed ghazals in the Urdu language and compiled a divan (a collection of ghazals where the entire alphabet is used at least once as the last letter to define the rhyme pattern).

Before Wali, Indian Ghazals were composed in Persian, almost being replicated in thought and style from the original Persian masters like Saa'di, Jami and Khaqani. Wali began, using not only an Indian language, but Indian themes, idioms and imagery in his ghazals. It is said that his visit to Delhi in 1700, along with his divan of Urdu ghazals created a ripple in the literary circles of the north, inspiring them to produce stalwarts like Zauq, Sauda and Mir.

== Early life ==
He was born in 1667 at Aurangabad, an important city in present-day Maharashtra which was then part of the Mughal Empire. He loved travelling, which he regarded as a means of education. He visited Delhi, Surat, Burhanpur and also undertook the pilgrimage to Mecca and Medina.

== Career ==
Wali Mohammed Wali's visit to Delhi in 1700 is considered to be of great significance for Urdu Ghazals. It was believed that he introduced deccani mushaira to Delhi. His simple, sensuous and melodious poems in Urdu, awakened the Persian loving poets of Delhi to the beauty and capability of "Rekhta" (the old name for Urdu) as a medium of poetic expression. Wali Mohammed Wali's visit thus stimulated the growth and development of Urdu Ghazal in Delhi.

He died in Ahmedabad in 1707 in what is now Gujarat state, and was buried in the same city.

== Genre ==
Although Wali tried his hand at a variety of verse forms including the masnavi, qasida, mukhammas, and the rubai., the ghazal is his speciality. He wrote 473 ghazals containing 3,225 couplets (Ashaar). His poems were simple, sensuous & melodious. He was a trend setter in classical poetry who helped establish Urdu ghazal in Delhi by inspiring different poets to write in Urdu It is believed that Wali started to have established the tradition of writing ghazals in Urdu and also influencing the other writers when he visited Delhi. Before that, the preferred language for ghazals was Persian.

Some of his famous couplets are:

- Jisay Ishq Ka Teer Kaari Lagay
- Use Zindagi Jag Mein Bhaari Lagay
- Naa Chode Mohabbat Daame Marg Tak
- Jisay Yaar Jaanisoon Yaari Lagay
- Naa Howe Use Jag Mein Hargiz Qaraar
- Jise Ishq Ki Beqaraari Lagay
- Har Ek Waqt Mujhe Aashiq Zaar Koon
- Pyaare Teri Baat pyaari Lagay
- "Wali" Koon Kahe Tu Agar Yak Bachan

Raqeebon Dil Mein Kataari Lagay

== Themes ==
His favorite theme was love – both mystical and earthy – and his characteristic tone was one of cheerful affirmation and acceptance, rather than of melancholy grumbling. He was the first Urdu poet to express love from the man's point of view, against the prevailing convention of impersonating a woman.

Wali used his native language richly, and also incorporated Persian diction and imagery into his verse. He was considered an architect of the modern poetic language, which is a blend of Aam Boli and Persian vocabulary. His diction was unique, for example in this ghazal:

Yaad karna har ghari us yaar ka

Hai wazifa mujh dil-e-bimaar ka.

Aarzoo-e-chasma-e-kausar nahin

Tishna-lab hun sharbat-e-didaar ka.

Aakbat kya howega maalum nahin

Dil hua hai mubtla dildaar ka.

Kya kahe tarif dil, hai be nazir,

Harf harf us makhzan-e-Israar ka.

Gar hua hai taalib-e-Aazadgi,

Band mat ho subba-o-zunnaar ka.

Masnad-e-gul manzil-e-shabanam hui,

Dekh rutba dida-e-bedaar ka.

Aye Wali hona srijan par nisaar,

Mudda hai chashm-e-gohar baar ka.

== Memorials ==
His memorial tomb in Shahibaug, Ahmedabad was attacked by the Hindu mob during riots in 2002 and replaced with makeshift Hanuman temple by Hindu Administration. It was completely razed and the road was constructed overnight. After protests from citizens and literary class of city, the Public Interest Litigation was filed in the Gujarat High Court.

In 2010, a widely acclaimed short film on Wali's life was made by a film-maker Gopal K. Annam.

== See also ==
- Muhammad Quli Qutb Shah
- Siraj Aurangabadi
- Azad Bilgrami
- Urdu
- Urdu poetry
- List of Urdu Poets
