= Anjuman-i Taraqqi-i Urdu =

Literary organisation for the promotion of Urdu (1886)

- Founded: 1886 (renamed in 1903)
- Founded at: Aligarh, British India
- Type: Literary organisation
- Legal status: Non-government organization
- Headquarters: New Delhi; Karachi
- Location(s): Shifted to Aurangabad, part of the Hyderabad State in 1913; Shifted to Delhi in 1938; Established in Karachi in 1948
- Key people: Syed Ahmad Khan; Abdul Haq

Urdu literature اردو ادب
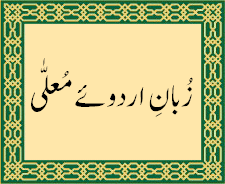

Urdu literature
- By category Urdu language Rekhta

Major figures
- Amir Khusrau - Wali Dakhani - Mir Taqi Mir - Ghalib - Abdul Haq - Muhammad Iqbal

Urdu writers
- Writers – Novelists – Poets

Forms
- Ghazal - Dastangoi - Nazm – Fiction

Institutions
- Anjuman-i Taraqqi-i Urdu; Urdu movement Literary Prizes

Anjuman-i Taraqqi-i Urdu (Urdu: اَنْجُمَنِ تَرَقِیِ اُرْدُوْ; Organisation for the Progress of Urdu) was an organisation working for the promotion and dissemination of Urdu language, literature and culture in British India.

After the partition of India, the separated organisations, Anjuman Taraqqi Urdu Hind in the Republic of India and Anjuman-i Taraqqi-i Urdu Pakistan continue their work. These serve as the largest Urdu scholarly promotional associations in the subcontinent.

== History ==
The organisation owes its origin to the All India Muslim Educational Conference, set up by the great social reformer and educationist Sir Syed Ahmad Khan in 1886, with the assistance of Nawab Mohsin-ul-Mulk. The basic objective of the above-mentioned conference was to encourage Indian Muslims to adopt modern education, and for this purpose, establish schools and colleges along the lines of the Muhammadan Anglo-Oriental College (later known as Aligarh Muslim University).

The conference had three sections: Women’s Education, Educational Census and Schools. In a later conference held in 1903, three more branches were added: Social Reform, Shoba-yi-Taraqqī-yi-Urdū, and Miscellaneous. It is to the Shoba-yi-Taraqqī-yi-Urdū that the current Anjuman traces its origins. Incidentally, Thomas Walker Arnold was the first elected president of the Shoba-yi-Taraqqī-yi-Urdū and the noted writer Allama Shibli Nomani was the first secretary along with Abul Kalam Azad, first Minister of Education in independent India, as Assistant Secretary. They were some of the renowned personalities that worked hard to create the Anjuman and people continue to draw inspiration from them even today.

Abdul Haq became the secretary of the organisation in 1912, and its base was shifted to the modern-day Aurangabad district in 1913, where he was employed by the then Nizam of Hyderabad. Thereafter, the Anjuman shifted its base to Delhi in 1938 where it functioned until 1947 with Abdul Haq as its head.

Under Abdul Haq, Anjuman launched a number of magazines notably Urdu launched in January 1921, Science, in 1928, and Hamari Zaban, in 1939.

== India ==
Anjuman in India is known as "Anjuman Taraqqi Urdu (Hind)" (انجمنِ ترقیِ اردو (ہند. It has 600 branches across India.

After the independence of India, Zakir Hussain become the Vice-Chancellor of Aligarh Muslim University in 1949. Anjuman Taraqui Urdu (Hind) was shifted to Aligarh Muslim University, Aligarh, Uttar Pradesh. In the year 1977 Anjuman was moved to New Delhi with its office at Urdu Ghar. It started to work for the promotion of Urdu as a common language in India. In the spirit of the Eighth Schedule of the Indian Constitution, it started to play a vital and positive role in the language of Indian origin.

Anjuman Taraqui Urdu (Hind) has echoed the nationalistic character under the guidance of Indian leaders like Mahatma Gandhi, Jawaharlal Nehru, C. Rajagopalachari, Maulana Abul Kalam Azad and Zakir Husain had good relations with Anjuman. Premchand was one of the prominent people of the Anjuman. It has been maintaining the "Ganga-Jumni Tehzib" (Ganga Yamuna Civilization) among the masses and working both for the Urdu language and national integrity.

The Anjuman Taraqqi Urdu (Hind) besides publishing journals and books, and supporting research and creative work in Urdu linguistics and literature, has many other activities to promote the language e.g. Urdu Adab (Quarterly), Hamari Zaban (Weekly), Books and Dictionaries, Urdu Archives, Photo Collection, Audio Collection, Writing Competition of Children's Literature, Urdu Theater - ARPAN (Anjuman's Repertory of Performing Arts)

Its office bearers include Sadiq-ur-Rahman Kidwai, President and Ather Farouqui, General Secretary.

== Pakistan ==
Anjuman in Pakistan is known as Anjuman-i Taraqqi-i Urdu (Pakistan) – (انجُمنِ ترقیِ اردو (پاکستان.

Abdul Haq, the Anjuman's secretary and one of its pioneering members, shifted to Pakistan in 1947 following its independence. The Anjuman played a decisive role in the Pakistan Movement. The office of Anjuman's Pakistani chapter was established in Karachi in 1948. The same year, a fortnightly and later monthly Urdu magazine known as Qaumi Zaban was launched by Anjuman which continues to remain in publication today. For some time, Anjuman also published Urdu magazines focusing on the subjects of economics, politics, history, and science. As the Anjuman's secretary, Abdul Haq played an instrumental role in the establishment of Karachi's Urdu College in 1949, with Urdu as the medium of instruction. After Abdul Haq's death in 1961, poet Jamiluddin Aali succeeded him as the Anjuman's secretary. Aali maintained a great interest in the affairs of the Urdu College, and during his tenure, the college attained university status – becoming the Federal Urdu University in 2002. Aali handed over his office to Fatema Hassan in 2014.

Membership of the organization was re-opened after 50 years on the occasion of the 53rd death anniversary of Abdul Haq. Anjuman currently operates a library and has released over 600 publications in Urdu on different topics to date. The organization publishes journals and books and supports research and creative work in Urdu linguistics and literature.
