= Sahar Ansari =

Poet, critic and scholar

- Born: 27 December 1939 (age 86); Aurangabad, Maharashtra, British India
- Occupations: Urdu poet, linguist, Professor and Chairman of Urdu department at the University of Karachi
- Writing career
- Language: Urdu
- Notable awards: Tamgha-e-Imtiaz (2006)

Sahar Ansari (Urdu: سحر انصاری) (born 27 December 1939 in Aurangabad, Maharashtra) is an Urdu poet and linguist from Karachi, Pakistan. He remained associated with the University of Karachi as Professor and Chairman of Urdu department.

Sahar was awarded Tamgha-e-Imtiaz by the Government of Pakistan in 2006.

== Controversy ==
Ansari was found guilty of sexually harassing a female Karachi University Professor in 2018. The alleged harassment incident had occurred two years earlier and had been under investigation by two committees since then.
