= Mir Taqi Mir =

Indian poet (1723–1810)

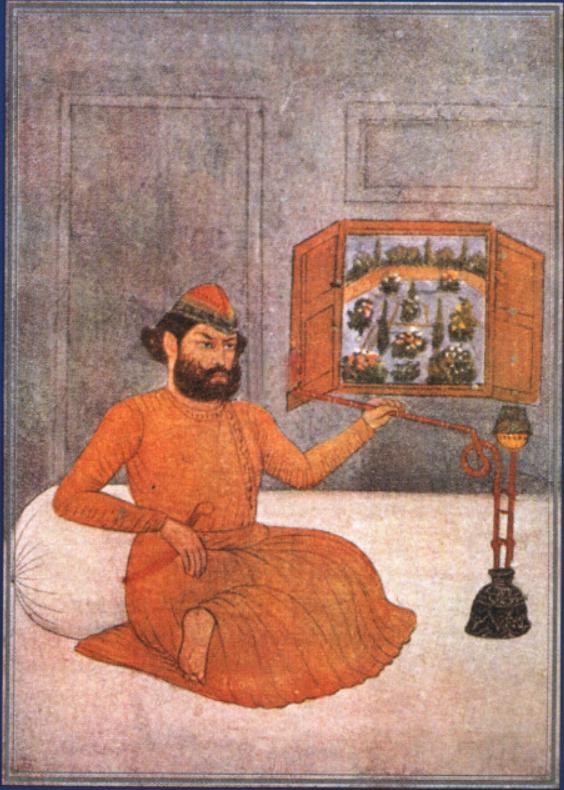
- Mir Taqi Mir in 1786
- Pronunciation: [miːɾ t̪əqiː miːɾ]
- Born: February 1723; Agra, Agra Subah, Mughal India (present-day Uttar Pradesh, India)
- Died: 20 September 1810 (aged 87); Lucknow, Oudh Subah, Mughal India (present-day Uttar Pradesh, India)
- Resting place: Lucknow
- Occupation: Poet
- Era: Mughal India
- Notable work: Faez-é-Mīr; Zikr-é-Mīr; Nikat-ush-Shuarā; Kuliyāt-é-Fārsī Kuliyāt-é-Mīr

Urdu literature اُرْدُو اَدَبْ
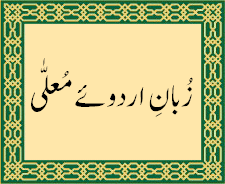

Urdu literature
- By category Urdu language Rekhta

Major figures
- Amir Khusrau - Wali Dakhani - Mir Taqi Mir - Ghalib - Abdul Haq - Muhammad Iqbal

Urdu writers
- Writers – Novelists – Poets

Forms
- Ghazal - Dastangoi - Nazm – Fiction

Institutions
- Anjuman-i Taraqqi-i Urdu; Urdu movement Literary Prizes

Mir Muhammad Taqi (Note: Urdu pronunciation: [miːɾ mʊɦəmːəd̪ t̪əqiː].) (February 1723 – 20 September 1810), known as Mir Taqi Mir (Note: Also spelled Meer Taqi Meer; Urdu pronunciation: [miːɾ t̪əqiː miːɾ].) (Urdu pronunciation: [miːɾ t̪əqiː miːɾ]), was an Urdu poet of the 18th-century Mughal India and one of the pioneers who gave shape to the Urdu language itself. He was one of the principal poets of the Delhi School of the Urdu ghazal and is often remembered as one of the best poets of the Urdu language. His pen name (takhallus) was Mir. He spent the latter part of his life in the court of Asaf-ud-Daulah in Lucknow.

His father's name was Meer Muttaqi. Following his father's death, his step-brothers seized control of his inheritance. His (paternal) step-uncle took care of him after he was orphaned, and after the death of his step-uncle, his maternal step-uncle took care of him. The signature of his poetry is the grief he expresses. His poetry expresses much grief and distress over the downfall of his city, Delhi.

== Life ==
The main source of information on Mir's life is his autobiography Zikr-e-Mir, which covers the period from his childhood to the beginning of his sojourn in Lucknow. However, it is said to conceal more than it reveals, with material that is undated or presented in no chronological sequence. Therefore, many of the 'true details' of Mir's life remain a matter of speculation.

=== Early life and background ===
Mir was born in Agra, India (then called Akbarabad and ruled by the Mughals) in August or February 1723. His grandfather had migrated from Hejaz to Hyderabad, then to Akbarabad or Agra. His philosophy of life was formed primarily by his father, Mir Abdullah, a religious man with a large following, whose emphasis on the importance of love and the value of compassion remained with Mir throughout his life and imbued his poetry. Mir's father died while the poet was in his teens, and left him some debt. Mir left Agra for Delhi a few years after his father's death, to finish his education and also to find patrons who offered him financial support (Mir's many patrons and his relationship with them have been described by his translator C. M. Naim). He was given a daily allowance by the Mughal Amir-ul-Umara and Mir Bakhshi, Khan-i Dauran, who was another native of Agra.

Some scholars consider two of Mir's masnavis (long narrative poems rhymed in couplets), Mu'amlat-e-ishq (The Stages of Love) and Khwab o Khyal-e Mir ("Mir's Vision"), written in the first person, as inspired by Mir's early love affairs, but it is by no means clear how autobiographical these accounts of a poet's passionate love affair and descent into madness are. Especially, as Frances W. Pritchett points out, the austere portrait of Mir from these masnavis must be juxtaposed against the picture drawn by Andalib Shadani, whose inquiry suggests a very different poet, given to unabashed eroticism in his verse.

=== Life in Lucknow ===
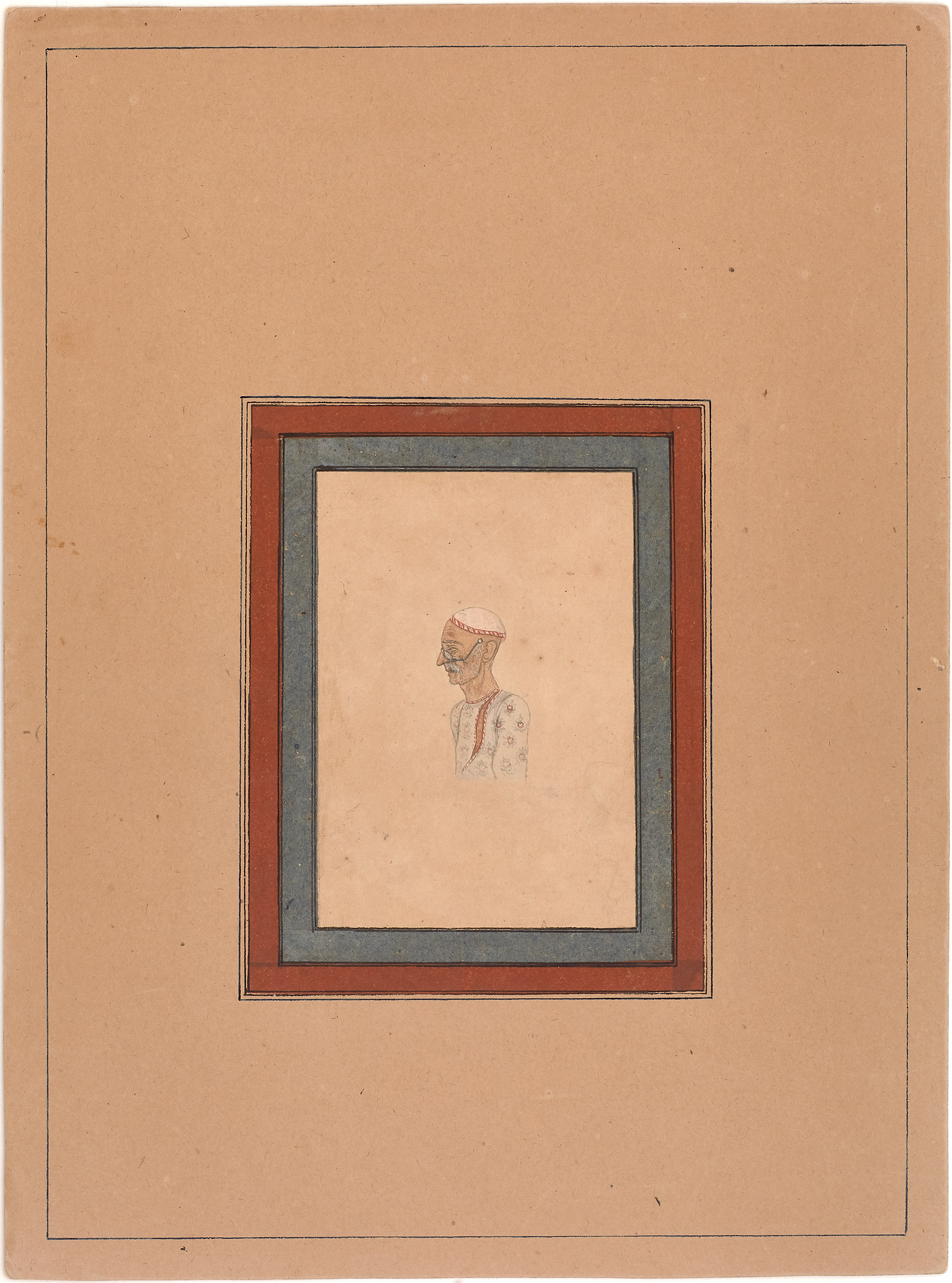
Mir Taqi Mir, Lucknow, 1800-10

Mir lived much of his life in Mughal Delhi. Kuchha Chelan, in Old Delhi was his address at that time. However, after Ahmad Shah Abdali's sack of Delhi each year starting 1748, he eventually moved to the court of Asaf-ud-Daulah in Lucknow, at the ruler's invitation. Distressed to witness the plundering of his beloved Delhi, he gave vent to his feelings through some of his couplets.

کیا بود و باش پوچھو ہو پورب کے ساکنو
ہم کو غریب جان کے ہنس ہنس پکار کے
دلّی جو ایک شہر تھا عالم میں انتخاب
رہتے تھے منتخب ہی جہاں روزگار کے
جس کو فلک نے لوٹ کے ویران کر دیا
ہم رہنے والے ہیں اسی اجڑے دیار کے

Mir migrated to Lucknow in 1782 and stayed there for the remainder of his life. Though he was given a kind welcome by Asaf-ud-Daulah, he found that he was considered old-fashioned by the courtiers of Lucknow (Mir, in turn, was contemptuous of the new Lucknow poetry, dismissing the poet Jur'at's work as merely 'kissing and cuddling'). Mir's relationships with his patron gradually grew strained, and he eventually severed his connections with the court. In his last years, Mir was very isolated. His health failed, and the untimely deaths of his daughter, son and wife caused him great distress.

=== Death ===
He died on 21 September 1810 due to an overdose of purgative or a laxative and was laid to rest in Lucknow. The marker of his burial place is believed to have been removed in modern times when railway tracks were built over his grave. In the 1970s, a cenotaph was built in the vicinity of his actual burial place, helped by Maqbool Ahmed Lari, the founder of Mir Academy in Lucknow.

== Literary life ==
His complete works, Kulliaat, consist of six Diwans containing 13,585 couplets, comprising a variety of poetic forms: ghazal, masnavi, qasida, rubai, mustezaad, satire, etc. Mir's literary reputation is anchored on the ghazals in his Kulliyat-e-Mir, many of them on themes of love. His masnavi Mu'amlat-e-Ishq (The Stages of Love) is one of the greatest known love poems in Urdu literature.

Mir lived at a time when the Urdu language and poetry were at a formative stage – and Mir's instinctive aesthetic sense helped him strike a balance between the indigenous expression and new enrichment coming in from Persian imagery and idiom, to constitute the new elite language known as Rekhta or Hindui. Basing his language on his native Hindustani, he leavened it with a sprinkling of Persian diction and phraseology, and created a poetic language at once simple, natural and elegant, which was to guide generations of future poets.

The death of his family members, together with earlier setbacks (including the traumatic stages in Delhi), lend a strong pathos to much of Mir's writing – and indeed Mir is noted for his poetry of pathos and melancholy.

According to Mir, Syed Sadaat Ali, a Sayyid of Amroha, convinced him to pursue poetry in Urdu:

"A Sayyid from Amroha took the trouble to put me on to writing poetry in the Urdu medium, the verse which resembled Persian poetry. Urdu was the language of Hindustan by the authority of the king and presently it was gaining currency. I worked at it very hard and practised this art to such a degree that I came to be acknowledged by the literari of the city. My verse became well known in the city and reached the ears of the young and old."

== Mir and Mirza Ghalib ==
Mir's famous contemporary, also an Urdu poet of no inconsiderable repute, was Mirza Rafi Sauda. Mir Taqi Mir was often compared with the later day Urdu poet, Mirza Ghalib. Lovers of Urdu poetry often debate Mir's supremacy over Ghalib or vice versa. It may be noted that Ghalib himself acknowledged, through some of his couplets, that Mir was indeed a genius who deserved respect. Here are two couplets by Mirza Ghalib on this matter.

Reekhta ke tum hī ustād nahīṅ ho ğhālib
Kehte haiṅ agle zamāne meṅ koī mīr bhī thā

— Mirza Ghalib
Translation:

You are not the only master of Rekhta, Ghalib
They say there used to be a Mir in the past

Ghalib apna yeh aqeeda hai baqaul-e-Nasikh
Aap bey behrah hai jo muataqid-e-Mir nahi

— Mirza Ghalib
Translation:

Ghalib! It's my belief in the words of Nasikh
He that vows not on Mir, is himself unlearned!

Ghalib and Zauq were contemporary rivals but both of them believed in the greatness of Mir and also acknowledged Mir's greatness in their poetry.

== Famous couplets ==
Some of his notable couplets are:

Hasti apni habab ki si hai
Yeh numaish ik saraab ki si hai

Translation:

My life is like a bubble
This world is like a mirage

Dikhaai diye yun ki bekhud kiya
Hamein aap se bhi juda kar chale

Translation:

She appeared in such a way that I lost myself And went by taking away my 'self' with her
Just her glimpse rendered me numb away she went leaving me separated from me

At a higher spiritual level, the subject of Mir's poem is not a woman but God. Mir speaks of man's interaction with the Divine. He reflects upon the impact on man when God reveals Himself to the man. So the same sher can be interpreted in this way as well:

Dikhaai diye yun ke bekhud kiya
Hamen aap se bhi juda kar chale

Translation:

When I saw You (God) I lost all sense of self
I forgot my own identity

Other shers:

Gor kis diljale ki hai ye falak?
Shola ek subah yahaan se uthta hai

Translation:

What heart-sick sufferer's grave is the sky?
an Ember rises hence at dawn

Ashk aankhon mein kab nahin aata?
Lahu aata hai jab nahin aata

Translation:

From my eye, when doesn't a tear fall?
Blood falls when it doesn't fall

Bekhudi le gai kahaan humko,
Der se intezaar hai apna

Translation:

Where has selflessness taken me
I've been waiting for myself for long

Raah-e-door-e-ishq mein rotaa hai kyaa
Aage aage dekhiye hotaa hai kyaa

Translation:

In the long road of Love, why do you wail
Just wait and watch how things unveil

Deedani hai shikastagi dil ki
Kya imaarat ghamon ne dhaai hai

Translation:

Worth-watching is my heart's crumbling
What a citadel have sorrows razed

Baad marne ke meri qabr pe aaya wo 'Mir'
Yaad aai mere Isa ko dawa mere baad

Translation:

O Mir, he came to my grave after I'd died
My messiah thought of a medicine after I'd died

Mir ke deen-o-mazhab ka poonchte kya ho un nay to
kashka khaincha dair mein baitha kab ka tark Islam kiya

Translation:

What can I tell you about Mir's faith or belief?
A tilak on his forehead, in a temple he resides, having abandoned Islam long ago

Najane log kehte hain kis ko suroor-e-qalb,
Aya nahin ye lafz to Hindi Zuban (Urdu) ke beec

Translation:

People haven't understood what is pleasure of heart, This term hasn't arrived in Hindi tongue yet

== Mir Taqi Mir in fiction ==
- Khushwant Singh's famous novel Delhi: A Novel gives very interesting details about the life and adventures of the great poet.
- Mah e Mir is a 2016 Pakistani biographical film directed by Anjum Shahzad in which Fahad Mustafa played Mir Taqi Mir.

== Major works ==
- Nikat-us-Shura, a biographical dictionary of Urdu poets of his time, written in Persian.
- Faiz-e-Mir, a collection of five stories about Sufis & faqirs, said to have been written for the education of his son Mir Faiz Ali.
- Zikr-e-Mir, an autobiography written in Persian.
- Kulliyat-e-Farsi, a collection of poems in Persian
- Kulliyat-e-Mir, a collection of Urdu poetry consisting of six diwans (volumes).
- Mir Taqi Mir Ki Rubaiyat

== See also ==
- List of Urdu poets
- Ghazal
