= Ghalib =

Indian poet (1797–1869)

Mirza Ghalib
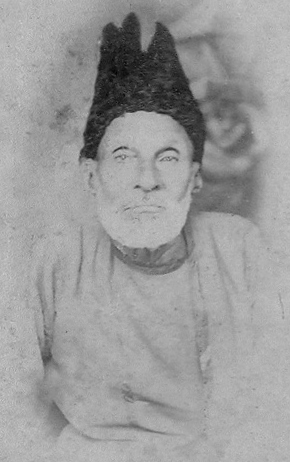
- Ghalib in 1868
- Born: Mirza Asadullah Beg Khan; 27 December 1797; Kala Mahal, Agra, Maratha Confederacy
- Died: 15 February 1869 (aged 71); Ghalib ki Haveli, Delhi, British India
- Resting place: Mazar-e-Mirza Ghalib Tomb, near Nizamuddin Dargah, Delhi
- Occupations: Poet; author
- Spouse: Umrao Begum (m. 1810)
- Parent(s): Mirza Abdullah Baig (father); Izzat-ut-Nisa Begum (mother)
- Writing career
- Pen name: Ghalib, Asad
- Language: Urdu, Persian
- Years active: c. 1808–1869
- Period: Mughal era British era
- Genres: Ghazal; qasida; ruba'i, qit'a; marsiya
- Subjects: Love; philosophy; mysticism
- Notable work: Diwan-e-Ghalib
- Movement: Urdu movement

Urdu literature اردو ادب
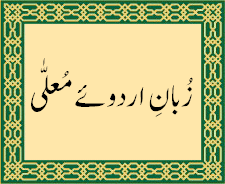

Urdu literature
- By category Urdu language Rekhta

Major figures
- Amir Khusrau - Wali Dakhani - Mir Taqi Mir - Ghalib - Abdul Haq - Muhammad Iqbal

Urdu writers
- Writers – Novelists – Poets

Forms
- Ghazal - Dastangoi - Nazm – Fiction

Institutions
- Anjuman-i Taraqqi-i Urdu; Urdu movement Literary Prizes

Mirza Asadullah Beg Khan (1797–1869), also known as Mirza Ghalib, was an Indian poet. He was popularly known by the pen names Ghalib and Asad. His honorific was Dabir-ul-Mulk, Najm-ud-Daula. During his lifetime, the already declining Mughal Empire was eclipsed and displaced by the British East India Company rule and finally deposed following the defeat of the Indian Rebellion of 1857; these are described through his work.

He wrote in both Urdu and Persian. Although his Persian Divan (body of work) is at least five times longer than his Urdu Divan, his fame rests on his poetry in Urdu. Today, Ghalib remains popular not only in the Indian subcontinent but also among the Hindustani diaspora around the world.

== Early life ==
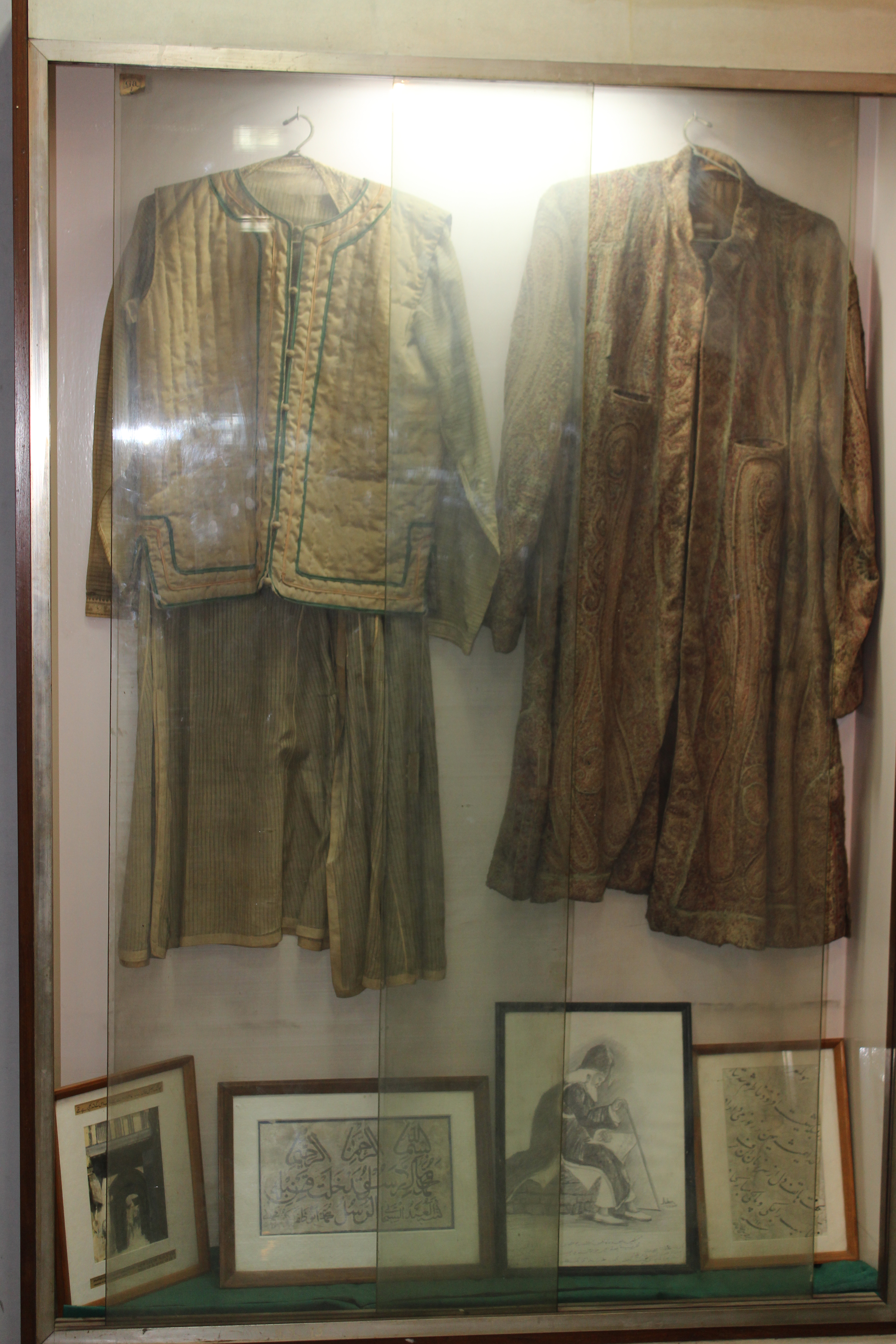
Clothes of Mirza Ghalib, at Ghalib Museum, New Delhi

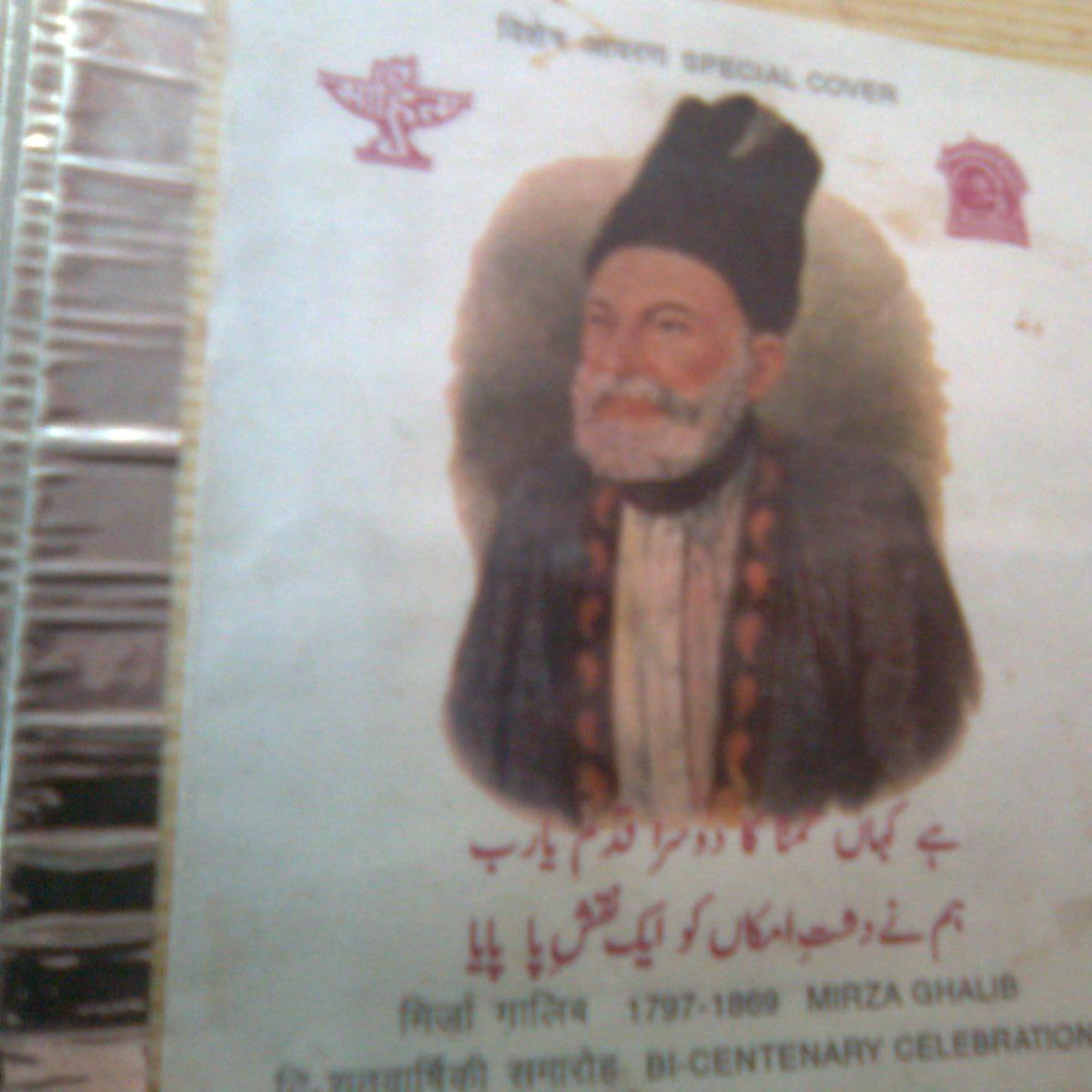
A special commemorative cover of Ghalib released in India.

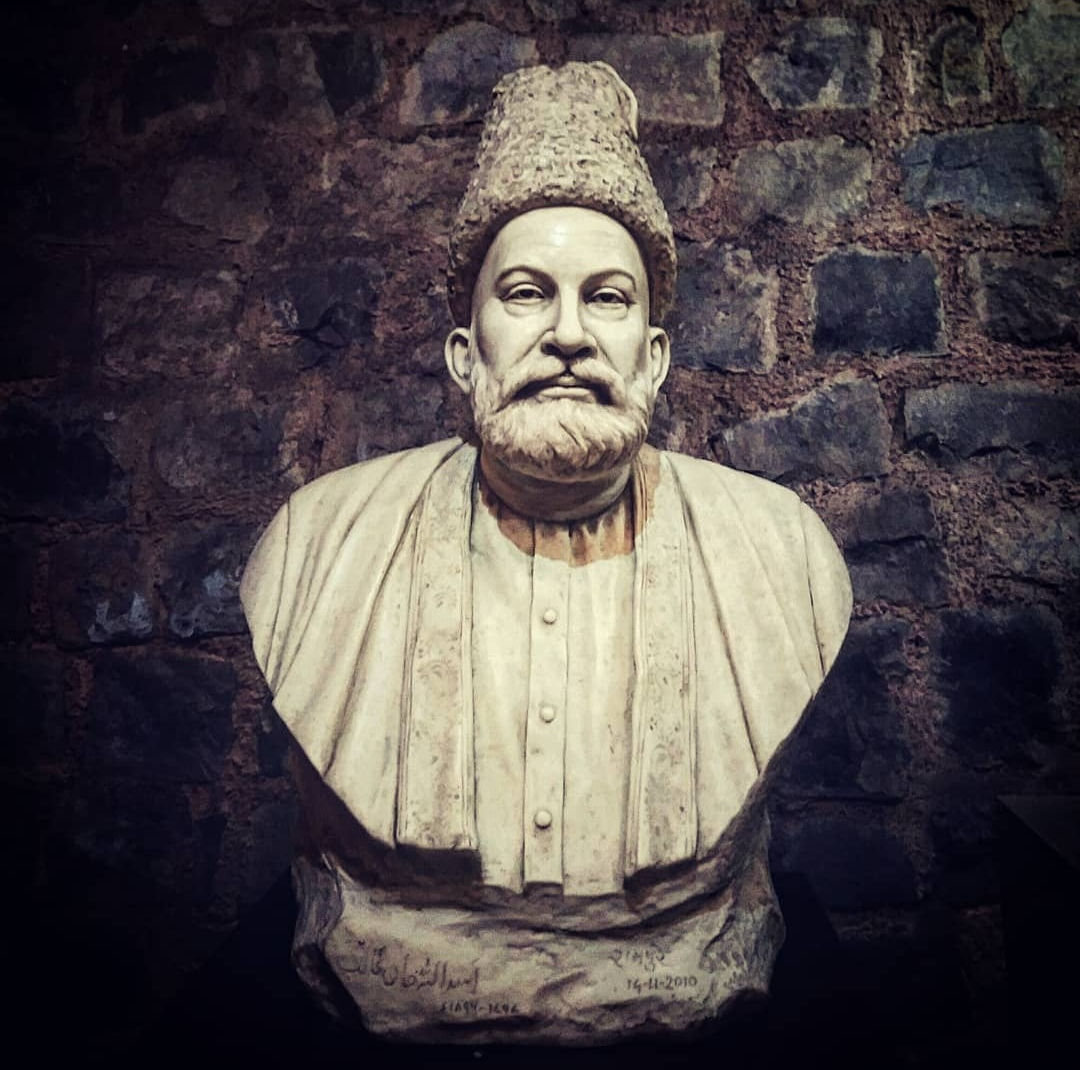
The statue of Mirza Ghalib at Ghalib ki Haveli.

Mirza Ghalib was born in Kala Mahal, Agra into a family of Mughals who moved to Samarkand (in modern-day Uzbekistan) after the downfall of the Seljuk kings. His paternal grandfather, Mirza Qoqan Baig, was a Seljuq Turk, and a descendant of Sultan Berkyaruq who had immigrated to India from Samarkand during the reign of Ahmad Shah (1748–54). He worked in Lahore, Delhi and Jaipur, was awarded the sub-district of Pahasu (Bulandshahr) and finally settled in Agra. He had four sons and three daughters.

Mirza Abdullah Baig (Ghalib's father) married Izzat-ut-Nisa Begum, an ethnic Kashmiri, and then lived at the house of his father-in-law. He was employed first by the Nawab of Lucknow and then the Nizam of Hyderabad. He died in a battle in 1803 in Alwar and was buried at Rajgarh, Alwar, when Ghalib was a little over 5 years old. He was then raised by his Uncle Mirza Nasrullah Baig Khan, but in 1806, Nasrullah fell off an elephant and died from related injuries.

In 1810, at the age of thirteen, Ghalib married Umrao Begum, daughter of Nawab Ilahi Bakhsh (brother of Ahmad Baksh Khan, the Nawab of Ferozepur Jhirka and Loharu and nephew of Qasim Jan). He soon moved to Delhi, along with his younger brother, Mirza Yousuf, who had developed schizophrenia at a young age and later died in Delhi during the chaos of 1857. None of his seven children survived beyond infancy. In one of his letters, he describes his marriage as the second imprisonment after the initial confinement that was life itself. The idea that life is one continuous painful struggle that can end only when life itself ends, is a recurring theme in his poetry. One of his couplets puts it in a nutshell:

قید حیات و بند غم ، اصل میں دونوں ایک ہیں
موت سے پہلے آدمی غم سے نجات پائے کیوں؟

Translation:

The prison of life and the bondage of sorrow are the same
Why should man be free of sorrow before dying?

There are conflicting reports regarding his relationship with his wife. She was considered to be pious, conservative, and God-fearing.

== Mughal titles ==
In 1850, Emperor Bahadur Shah Zafar bestowed upon Mirza Ghalib the title of Dabir-ul-Mulk (Persian: دبیر الملک, lit. 'secretary of state'). The Emperor also added to it the additional title of Najm-ud-daula (Persian: نجم الدولہ, lit. 'star of the state'). The conferment of these titles was symbolic of Mirza Ghalib's incorporation into the nobility of Delhi. He also received the title of Mirza Nosha (Persian: مرزا نوشہ) from the Emperor, thus enabling him to add Mirza to his name. He was also an important courtier of the royal court of the Emperor. As the Emperor was himself a poet, Mirza Ghalib was appointed as his poet tutor in 1854. He was also appointed as a tutor of Prince Fakhr-ud Din Mirza, eldest son of Bahadur Shah II, (d. 10 July 1856). He was also appointed by the Emperor as the royal historian of the Mughal Court.

Being a member of declining Mughal nobility and old landed aristocracy, he never worked for a livelihood, lived on either royal patronage of Mughal Emperors, credit, or the generosity of his friends. His fame came to him posthumously. He had himself remarked during his lifetime that he would be recognized by later generations. After the decline of the Mughal Empire and the rise of the British Raj, despite his many attempts, Ghalib could never get the full pension restored.

== Literary career ==
Ghalib started composing poetry at the age of 11. His first language was Urdu, but Persian and Turkish were also spoken at home. He received an education in Persian and Arabic at a young age. During Ghalib's period, the words "Hindi" and Urdu" were synonyms (see Hindi–Urdu controversy). Ghalib wrote in Perso-Arabic script which is used to write modern Urdu, but often called his language "Hindi"; one of his works was titled Ode-e-Hindi (Urdu: عود هندی, lit. 'Perfume of Hindi').

When Ghalib was 14 years old a newly converted Muslim tourist from Iran (Abdus Samad, originally named Hormuzd, a Zoroastrian) came to Agra. He stayed at Ghalib's home for two years and taught him Persian, Arabic, philosophy, and logic.

Ghalib poem in Nastaliq

Although Ghalib valued Persian over Urdu, his fame rests on his writings in Urdu. Numerous commentaries on Ghalib's ghazal compilations have been written by Urdu scholars. The first such elucidation or Sharh was written by Ali Haider Nazm Tabatabai of Hyderabad during the rule of the last Nizam of Hyderabad. Before Ghalib, the ghazal was primarily an expression of anguished love; but Ghalib expressed philosophy, the travails, and mysteries of life and wrote ghazals on many other subjects, vastly expanding the scope of the ghazal.

In keeping with the conventions of the classical ghazal, in most of Ghalib's verses, the identity and the gender of the beloved are indeterminate. The critic/poet/writer Shamsur Rahman Faruqui explains that the convention of having the "idea" of a lover or beloved instead of an actual lover/beloved freed the poet-protagonist-lover from the demands of realism. Love poetry in Urdu from the last quarter of the seventeenth century onwards consists mostly of "poems about love" and not "love poems" in the Western sense of the term.

The first complete English translation of Ghalib's ghazals was Love Sonnets of Ghalib, written by Sarfaraz K. Niazi and published by Rupa & Co in India and Ferozsons in Pakistan. It contains complete Roman transliteration, explication, and an extensive lexicon.

=== Pensions and Patronage ===
Ghalib has been described as having been concerned about receiving pensions more so than building an estate or engaging in commerce. Ghalib was paid a monthly salary of 52 rupees and 8 annas from his uncle's government pension until 1827. He travelled to Calcutta and presented a petition to the Governor-General to keep receiving money from this pension.

One of Ghalib's ambitions in life was to become the highest-ranking Ustaad for the royal Mughal Court. This position not only would prove his artistic mastership but also provide a salary of 400 rupees a month. Before becoming the official poet laureate of the court, Ghalib was paid a salary of 50 rupees a month to write histories on the history of the House of Taimur.

=== Letters ===
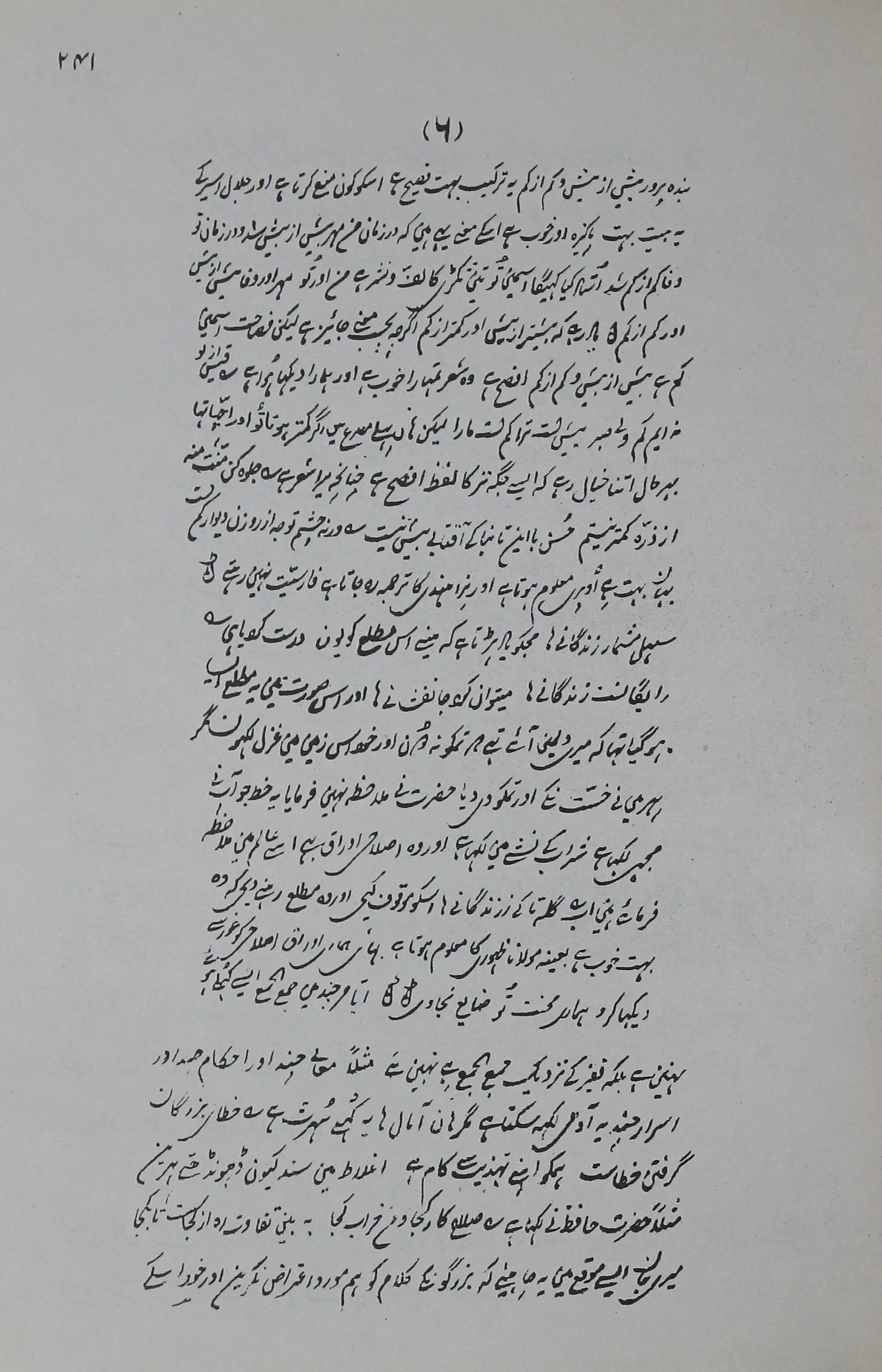
A page from Ghalib's letters( in his hand)

Mirza Ghalib was a gifted letter writer. Not only Urdu poetry but prose is indebted to Mirza Ghalib. His letters gave foundation to easy and popular Urdu. Before Ghalib, letter writing in Urdu was highly ornamental. He made his letters "talk" by using words and sentences as if he were conversing with the reader. According to Ghalib:

ہزار کوس سے بہ زبانِ قلم باتیں کرو
ہجر میں وصال کے مزے لیا کرو

Translation:

From a thousand miles, talk with the tongue of the pen,
and enjoy the joy of meeting even when you are separated.

His letters were very informal; sometimes he would just write the name of the person and start the letter. He was very humorous and wrote very interesting letters. In a letter he wrote, "Main koshish karta hoon ke koi aisi baat likhoon jo padhe khush ho jaaye'" (I want to write lines such that whoever reads them would enjoy them). Some scholars say that Ghalib would have the same place in Urdu literature based on his letters only. They have been translated into English by Ralph Russell in The Oxford Ghalib.

Ghalib was a chronicler of a turbulent period. One by one, Ghalib saw the bazaars – Khas Bazaar, Urdu Bazaar, Kharam-ka Bazaar, disappear, and whole mohallas (localities) and katras (lanes) vanish. The havelis (mansions) of his friends were razed to the ground. Ghalib wrote that Delhi had become a desert. Water was scarce. Delhi was "a military camp". It was the end of the feudal elite to which Ghalib had belonged. He wrote:

ہے موجزن اک قلزم خوں کاش یہی ہو
آتا ہے ابھی دیکھیے کیا کیا مرے آگے

Translation:

An ocean of blood churns around me - Alas! Was this all?
The future will show what more remains for me to see."

=== Pen name ===
His original Takhallus (pen-name) was Asad (meaning lion), drawn from his given name, Asadullah Khan. At some point early in his poetic career he also decided to adopt the pen-name of Ghalib (meaning all conquering, superior, most excellent).

=== A journey that changed Mirza Ghalib’s course of life ===
Ghalib’s poetry or shayari had smitten Mughal Badshah of Delhi, Bahadur Shah Zaffar. During the reign of the British, the badshah became a British pensioner. He was kept under strict supervision by the British along with his visitors including Ghalib as they grew suspicious of him. The shayari maestro’s pension was suspended by the British. This made Ghalib take a long journey to Calcutta to make an appeal about his pension to the British Governor General.

Mirza Ghalib’s journey to Kolkata, or erstwhile Calcutta made a huge difference in his literary journey. Mirza Ghalib came to the city of joy and fell in love. His love for Kolkata is depicted in one of his creations, Safar-e-Kalkattah where he talks about his stay in his humble abode, Haveli No 133 situated in the Simla Market Area during his stay in Kolkata. He used to write his verses in Urdu but started writing his poetry in Persian after this visit. He realized that the literary circle of Calcutta was very different from his known world. During his stay in Kolkata, he attended many literary gatherings which were not courtly in nature unlike Delhi. These were far liberal and flexible in nature which is imperative for any individual with a creative bent of mind.

Mirza Ghalib’s sojourn in Calcutta widened the horizons of his literary journey. He established himself as one of the renowned poets in Calcutta and received both appreciation and criticism from the enlightened audience of the city. During this time, he penned two masnavis in Persian like Chiragh-e Dair (Lamp of the Temple) and Bad-e Mukhalif (Adverse Winds). His letters bear a testimony of his tale of love with Calcutta. In a letter that he wrote to Mirza Ali Bakhsh Khan, he says how the city has stolen his heart and left him mesmerized. He referred to the city as a place which offered a remedy for everything except death and also praised the talented people of the city.

== Mirza Ghalib and Sir Syed Ahmad Khan ==
1855, Sir Syed Ahmed Khan finished his scholarly, well-researched, and illustrated edition of Abul Fazl's Ai’n-e Akbari. Having finished the work to his satisfaction, and believing that Mirza Asadullah Khan Ghalib was a person who would appreciate his labors, he approached the great Ghalib to write a taqriz (in the convention of the times, a laudatory foreword) for it. Ghalib obliged, but what he produced was a short Persian poem castigating the Ai’n-e Akbari and, by implication, the imperial, sumptuous, literate and learned Mughal culture of which it was a product. The least that could be said against it was that the book had little value even as an antique document. Ghalib practically reprimanded Khan for wasting his talents and time on dead things. Worse, he highly praised the "sahibs of England" who at that time held all the keys to all the a’ins in this world.

The poem was unexpected, but it came at a time when Khan's thought and feelings were already inclining toward change. Ghalib seemed to be acutely aware of a European[English]-sponsored change in world polity, especially Indian polity. Syed Ahmed Khan might well have been piqued at Ghalib's admonitions, but he would also have realized that Ghalib's reading of the situation, though not nuanced enough, was basically accurate. Khan may also have felt that he, being better informed about the English and the outside world, should have himself seen the change that now seemed to be just around the corner. Sir Khan never again wrote a word in praise of the Ai’n-e Akbari and in fact gave up taking an active interest in history and archaeology and became a social reformer.

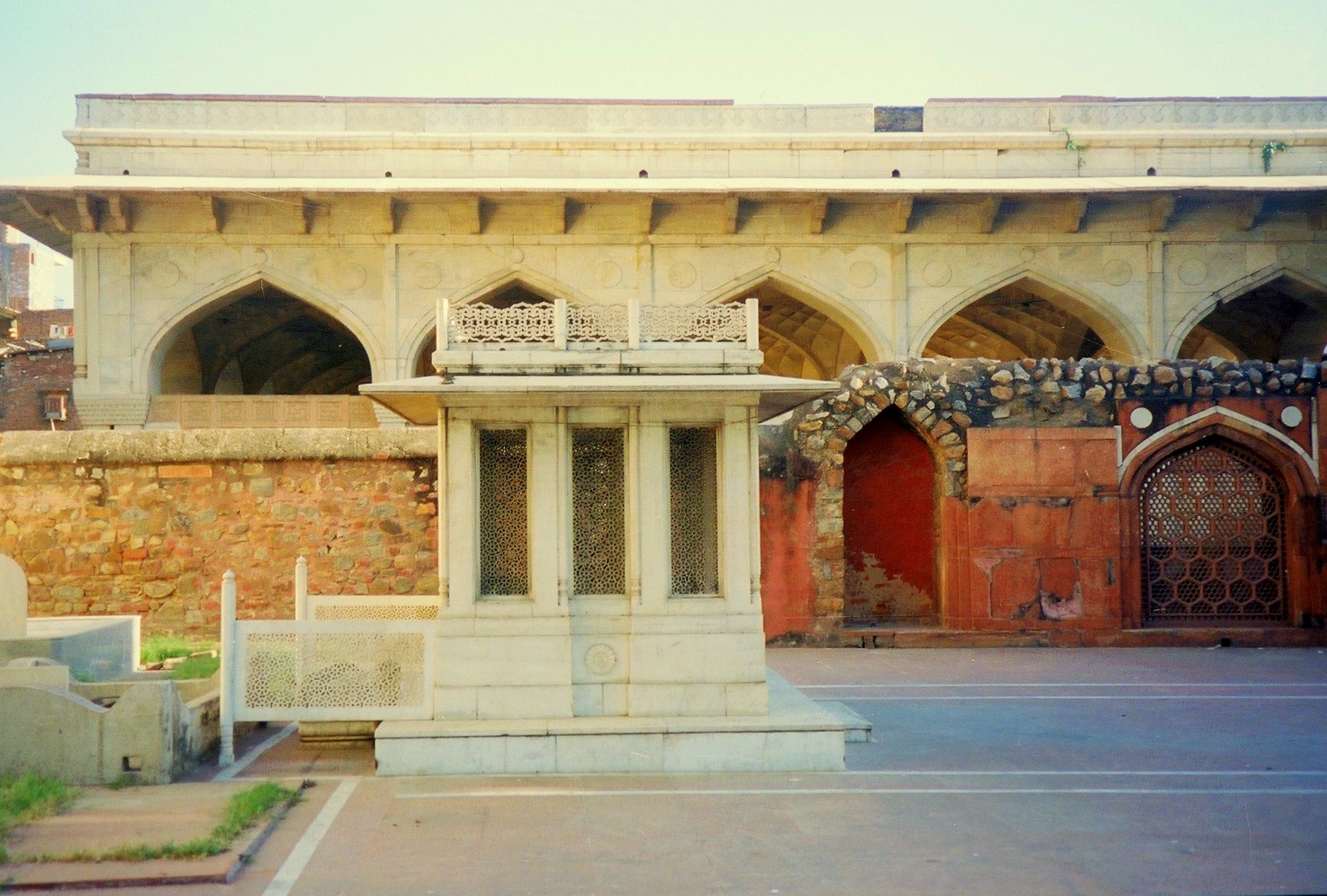
Mirza Ghalib's tomb near Chausath Khamba, Nizamuddin area Delhi

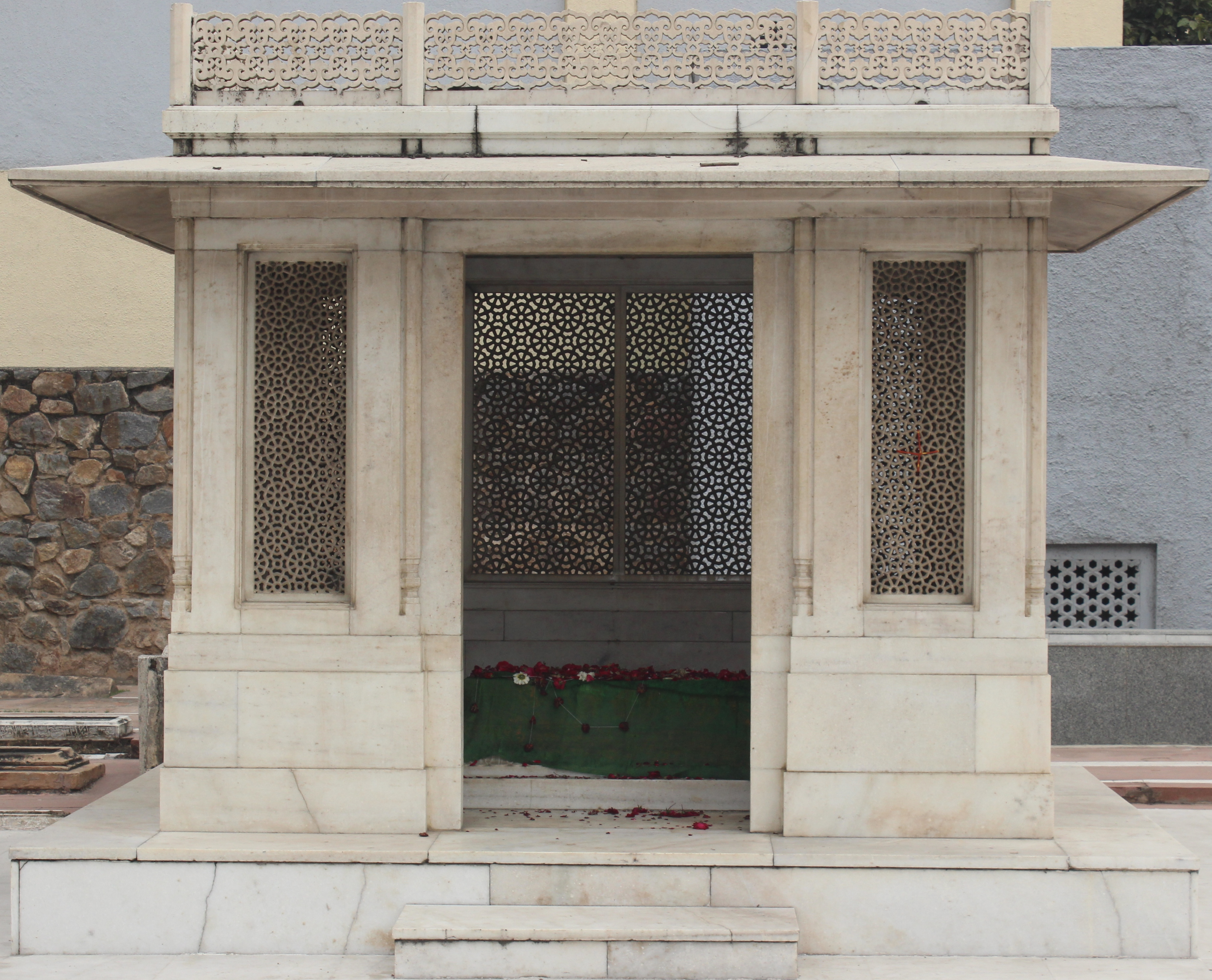

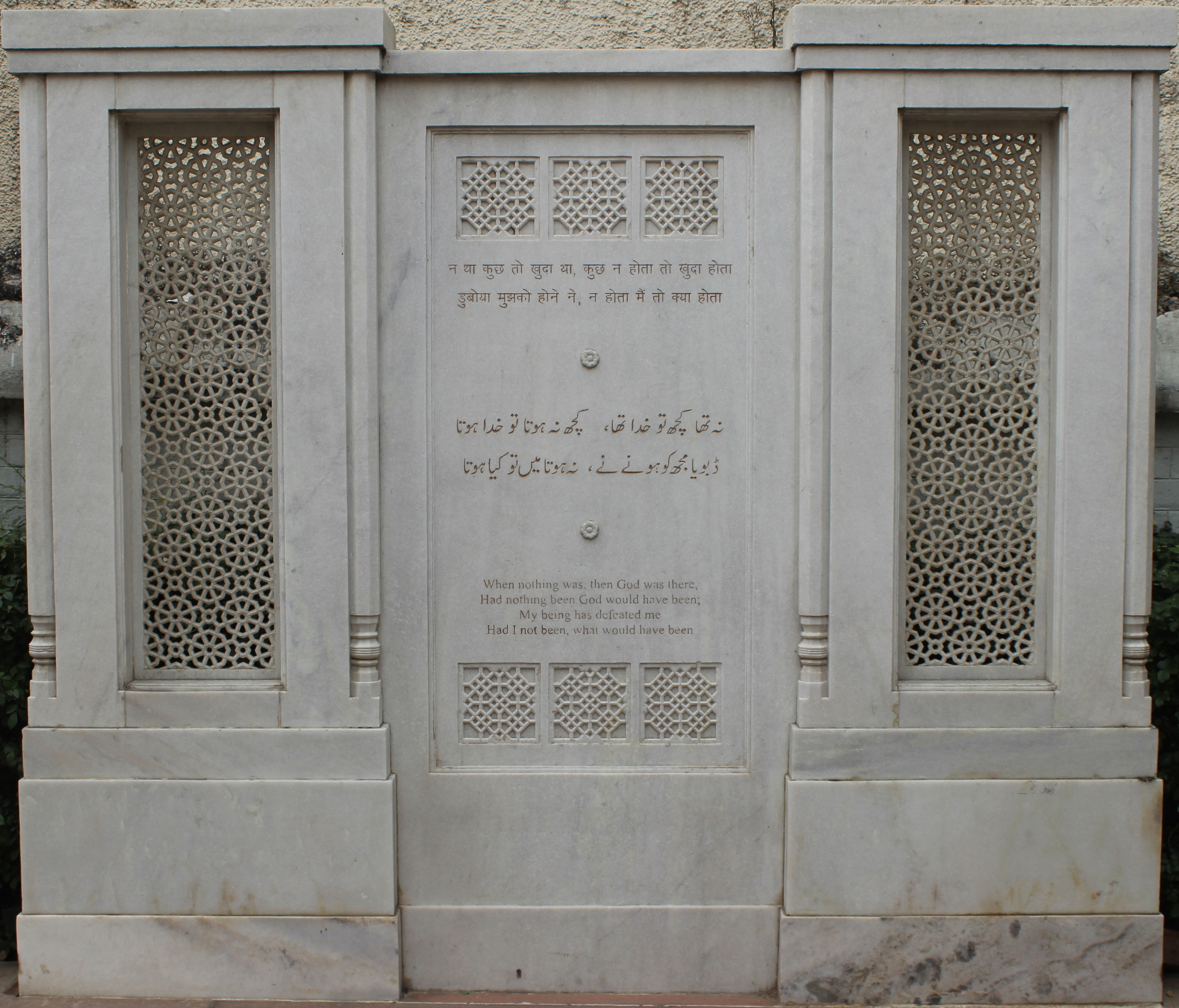
Inscription in Mirza Ghalib's Mausoleum

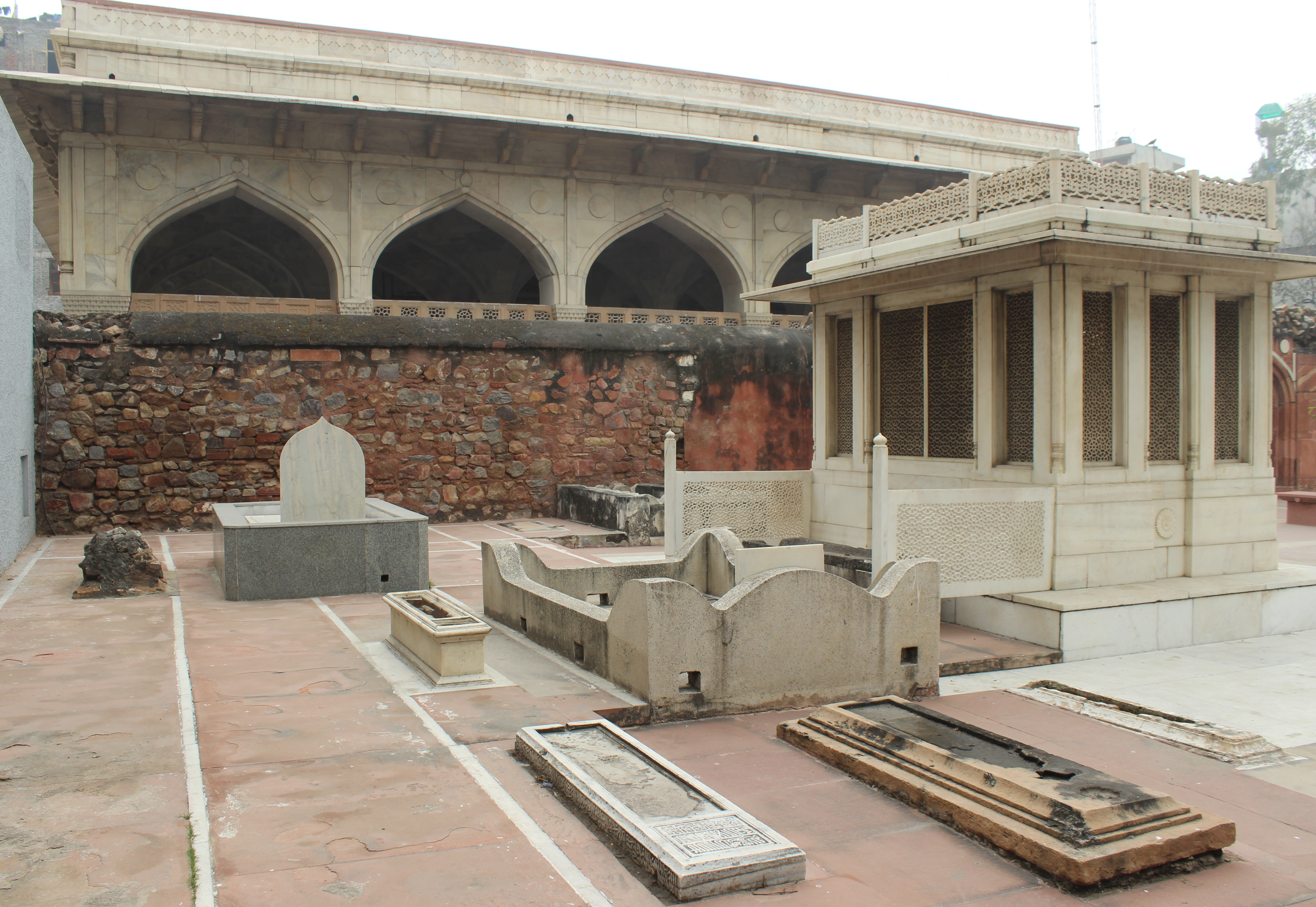

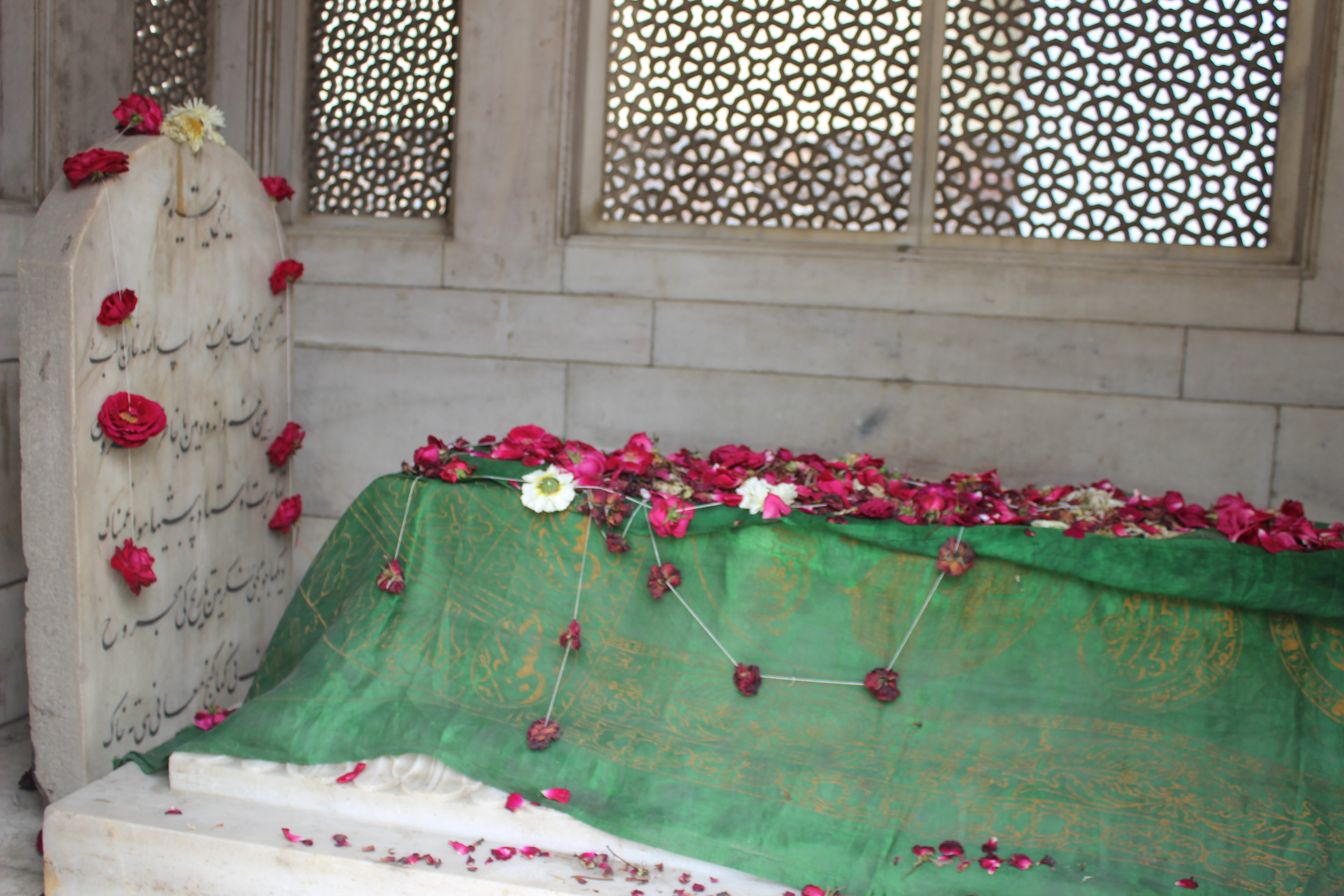

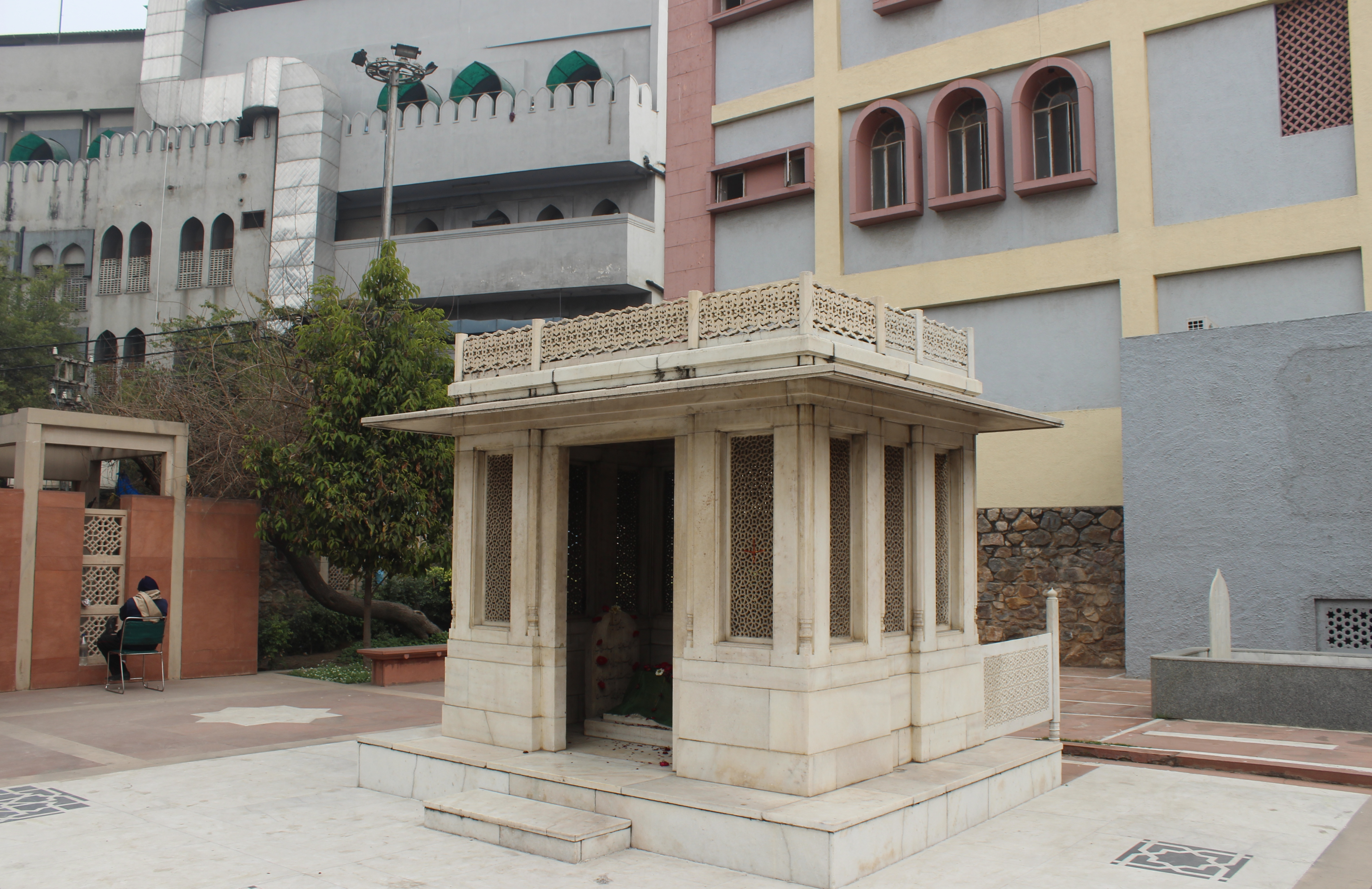

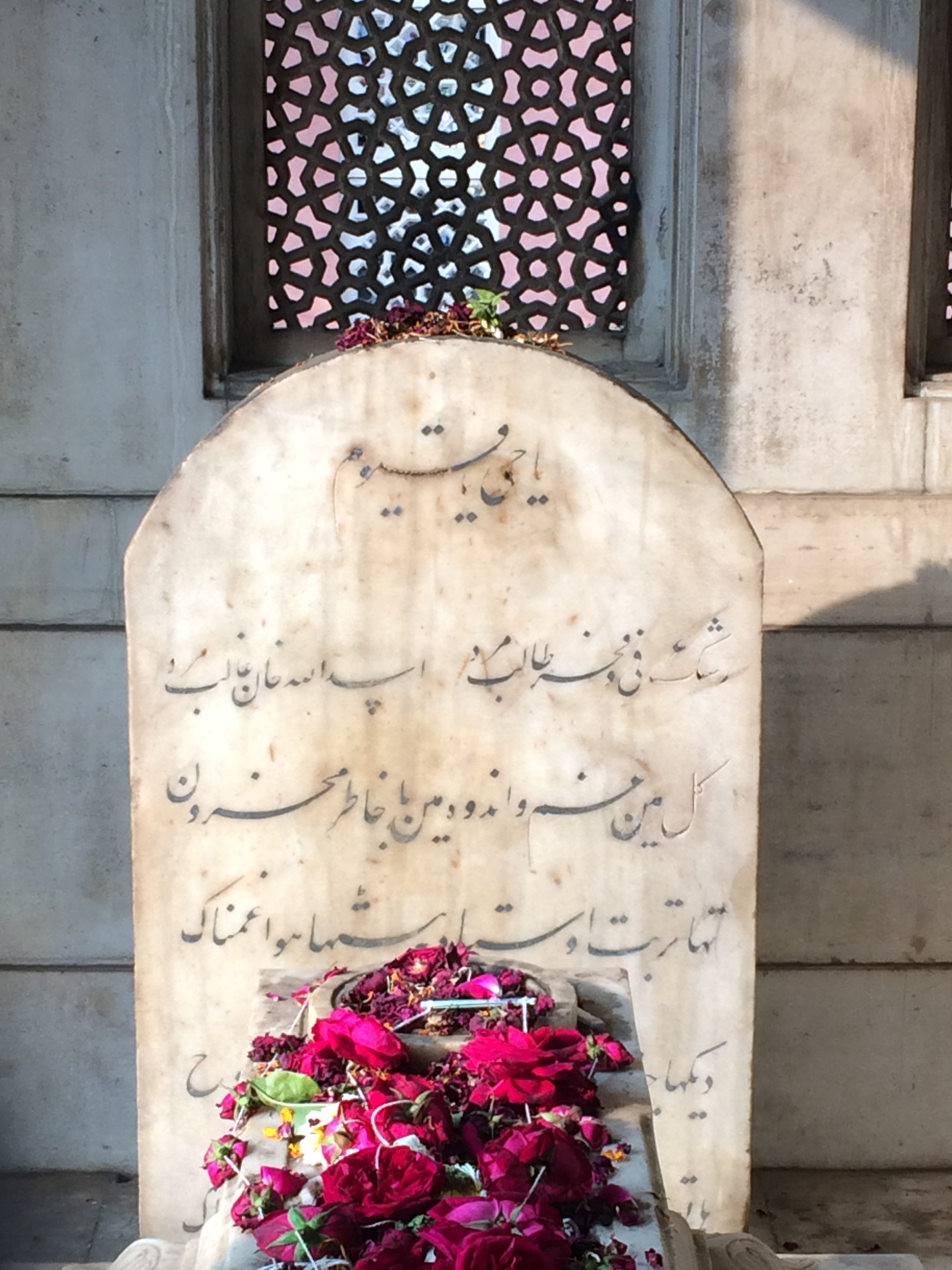
Tombstone of Mirza Ghalib

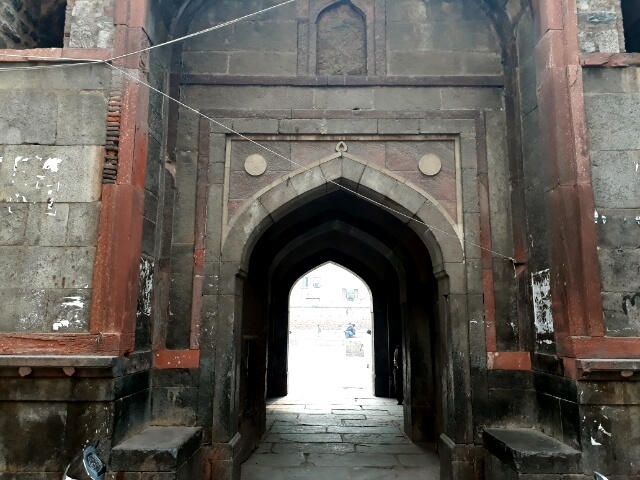
Front gate of Ghalib's Tomb compound

== Religious views ==
Ghalib placed a greater emphasis on seeking of God rather than ritualistic religious practices; although he followed Shia theology and had said many verses in praise of Alī ibn Abī Ṭālib. Ghalib states:

ہے پرے سرحد ادراک سے اپنا مسجود
قبلے کو اہل نظر قبلہ نما کہتے ہیں

Translation:

The object of my worship lies beyond perception's reach;
For men who see, the qibla is a compass, nothing more.

Like many other Urdu poets, Ghalib was capable of writing profoundly religious poetry, yet was skeptical about some interpretations of the Islamic scriptures done by certain religious leaders. On the idea of paradise, he once wrote in his Persian masnavi (مثنوی), "Abr-i-Guhar Baar" :

How canst Thou burn with a fire-mark in Hell a heart that finds no rest even in a garden? And, in Paradise, it is true that I shall drink at dawn the pure wine mentioned in the Quran, but where shall I find again the star of dawn I used to see on earth, and my crystal cup? Where in Paradise are the long walks of intoxicated friends in the night, or the drunken crowds shouting merrily? In that holy tavern, silent and still, how canst Thou introduce the sounds of the flute and the gay bustle of the taverns of this earth? Where shall I find, there, the intoxication of raining clouds? Where there is no autumn, how can spring exist? If the beautiful houries are eternally in one's heart, what of the sweet thought of them? Where will be the sadness of separation and the joy of union? How could we be thankful to an unknown beauty? What will be the pleasure of a sure fruition of love, without waiting? Where shall we find, there, a girl who flees away when we would kiss her? Where will be, there, one who betrays us with false oaths of love? The beauties of Paradise will obey us and their lips will never say anything bitter; they will give us pleasure, but with a heart forever closed to the desire for pleasure. Will there be in Paradise oglings, the pleasure of coquettish glances from afar? Where will it be, in Paradise, the dear window in a well-known wall?.

— Mirza Ghalib, In his Persian masnavi, Abr-i-Guhar baar

He staunchly disdained the practices of certain Ulema, who in his poems represent narrow-mindedness and hypocrisy:

کہاں مے خانہ کا دروازہ غالبؔ اور کہاں واعظ،
پر اتنا جانتے ہیں کل وہ جاتا تھا کہ ہم نکلے

Translation:

What's the relation between the Preacher and the door of the tavern,
but believe me, Ghalib, I am sure I saw him slip in as I departed.

In another verse directed towards certain maulavis (clerics), he criticized them for their ignorance and arrogant certitude: "Look deeper, it is you alone who cannot hear the music of his secrets". In his letters, Ghalib frequently contrasted the narrow legalism of the Ulema with "its pre-occupation with teaching the baniyas and the brats, and wallowing in the problems of menstruation and menstrual bleeding" and real spirituality for which you had to "study the works of the mystics and take into one's heart the essential truth of God's reality and his expression in all things".

During the anti-British Rebellion in Delhi on 5 October 1857, three weeks after the British troops had entered through Kashmiri Gate, some soldiers climbed into Ghalib's neighbourhood and hauled him off to Colonel Brown (Urdu: کمانڈنگ آفیسر کرنل براؤن, romanized: Kamānḍing Āfīsar Karnal Brāūn) for questioning. He appeared in front of the colonel wearing a Central Asian Turkic style headdress. The colonel, bemused at his appearance, inquired in broken Urdu, "Well? You Muslim?", to which Ghalib replied sardonically, "Half?" The colonel asked, "What does that mean?" In response, Ghalib said, "I drink wine, but I don't eat pork."

=== Naʽats of Ghalib ===
A large part of Ghalib's poetry focuses on the Naʽat, poems in praise of Muhammad, which indicates that Ghalib was a devout Muslim. Ghalib wrote his Abr-i gauharbar (Urdu: ابر گہر بار, lit. 'The Jewel-carrying Cloud') as a Naʽat poem. Ghalib also wrote a qasida of 101 verses in dedication to a Naʽat. Ghalib described himself as a sinner who should be silent before Muhammad as he was not worthy of addressing him, who was praised by God.

== Views on Hindustan ==
In his Persian poem Chiragh-i-Dair (Urdu: چراغ دیر, The Lamp of the Temple) which was composed during his trip to Benares during the spring of 1827, Ghalib mused about the land of Hindustan (India) and how Qiyamah (Doomsday) has failed to arrive, in spite of the numerous conflicts plaguing it.

Said I one night to a pristine seer

(Who knew the secrets of whirling Time)
'Sir you well perceive,
That goodness and faith,
Fidelity and love
Have all departed from this sorry land.
Father and son are at each other's throat;
Brother fights brother.
Unity and Federation are undermined.
Despite these ominous signs
Why has not Doomsday come?
Why does not the Last Trumpet sound?

Who holds the reins of the Final Catastrophe?'.

== Persian works ==
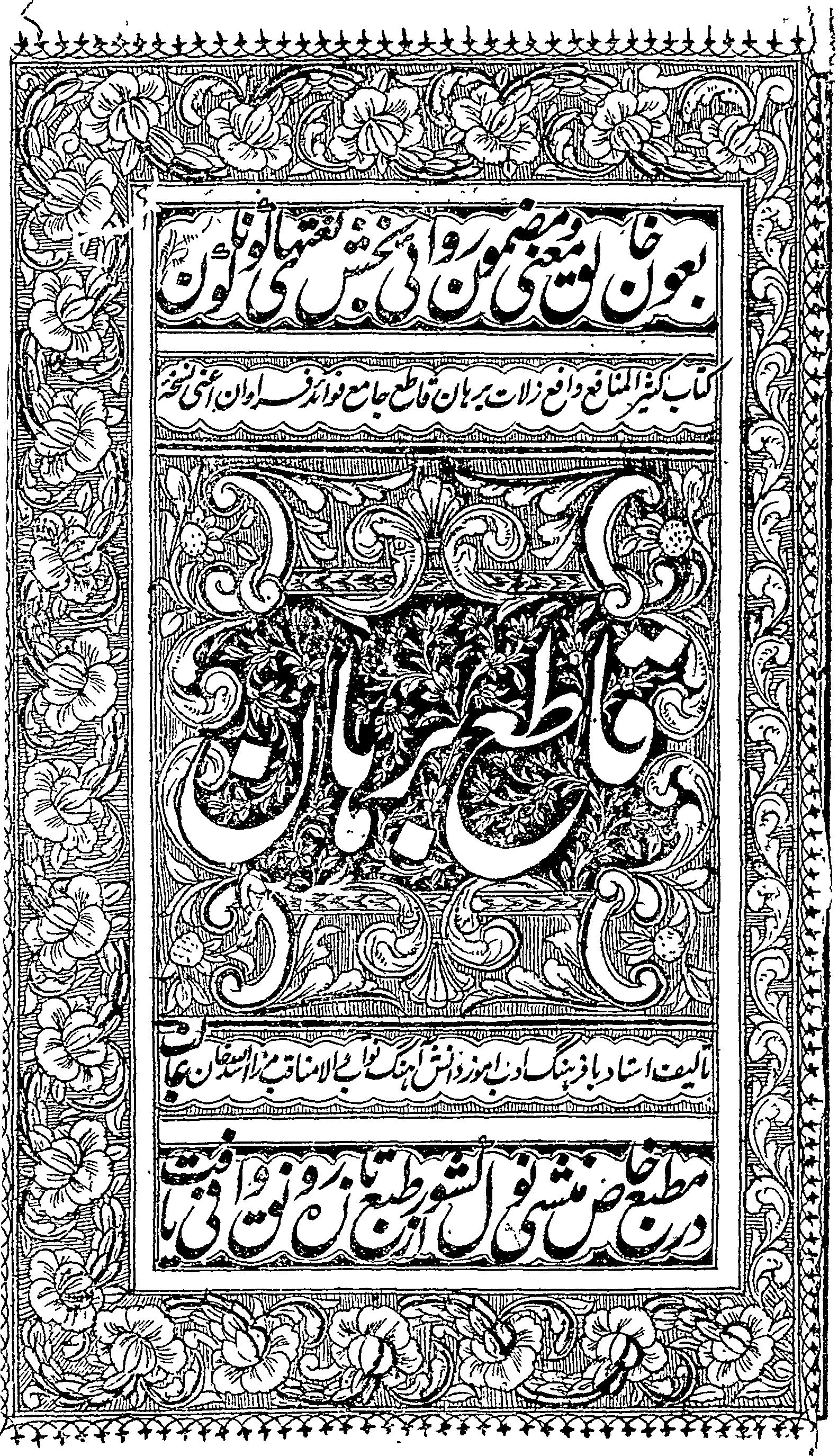
Cover Page of Ghalib's Qaat'i-e Burhaan

Ghalib held Persian in high regard, and his knowledge of the language was a point of pride for him. He believed his compositions in Persian were superior to those in Urdu, and hoped readers would evaluate him by the former:

See my Persian [poetry] so that you may see colorful pictures of many hues. Pass over my Urdu collection; it’s only a sketch.

The majority of Ghalib's poetic compositions in Persian were qasidahs dedicated to numerous patron rulers. Ghalib also created ghazals and mathnawis in Persian. His first published work in the language was a collection of poems titled May-ḵāna-ye ārzū, released in 1845. He also created prose works, such as Panj ahang, initially published in 1849. Mehr-e nīmrūz, published in 1855, was a history of the universe from its creation to the death of Mughal Emperor Humayun. Another such historical work was Dastanbu, an eyewitness account of the 1857 revolt and its aftermath. Ghalib's last significant work in Persian was Qaat'i-e Burhaan, a critique of Burhaan-e-Qaat'i, a controversial Persian dictionary.

In 2010, Maulana Azad National Urdu University published a compilation of 11,337 poems by Ghalib titled "Kulliyat-e-Ghalib Farsi". A few years before his death, Ghalib had written over 11,000 Persian poems in Persian while also writing over 1,700 Urdu poems.

== Contemporaries and disciples ==
Ghalib's closest rival was poet Zauq, tutor of Bahadur Shah Zafar, the then Mughal emperor with his seat in Delhi. There are some amusing anecdotes of the competition between Ghalib and Zauq and exchange of jibes between them. However, there was mutual respect for each other's talent. Both also admired and acknowledged the supremacy of Meer Taqi Meer, a towering figure of 18th century Urdu Poetry. Another poet Momin, whose ghazals had a distinctly lyrical flavour, was also a famous contemporary of Ghalib. One of the towering figures in Urdu literature Altaf Hussain Hali was a shagird (Urdu: شاگرد, lit. 'student') of Ghalib. Hali has also written a biography of Ghalib titled Yaadgaar-e-Ghalib.

Ghalib was not only a poet, he was also a prolific prose writer. His letters are a reflection of the political and social climate of the time. They also refer to many contemporaries like Mir Mehdi Majrooh, who himself was a good poet and Ghalib's lifelong acquaintance. The poems written by Ghalib were tough to understand. He sometimes made the sentence syntax so complex that people had difficulty in understanding them. Once, Hakeem Agha Jaan Aish aka Aish Dehlvi, a poet of Ghalib's era, read a couplet in a Mushaira mocking Ghalib:

اگر اپنا کہا تم آپ ہی سمجھے تو کیا سمجھے
مزا کہنے کا جب ہے اک کہے اور دوسرا سمجھے

Translation:

It is not praised if you are the only one to understand what you speak
Interesting is the situation when you speak and the others understand

Ghalib felt bad for this and wrote:

نہ ستائش کی تمنّا نہ صلے کی پروا
گر نہیں ہیں مرے اشعار میں معنی نہ سہی

Translation:

I don't need appreciation neither do I need any return
Let not be if there is no meaning in my couplets

This style was the definition of his uniqueness

In prose Ghalib brought a revolution in Urdu literature by developing an easy, simple and beautiful way of writing. Before Ghalib Urdu was a complex language, Ghalib introduced a simple style of prose in Urdu which is like a conversation.

=== Ghalib's grave ===
Ghalib was buried in Hazrat Nizamuddin near the tomb of Nizamuddin Auliya. The side view of Mazar-e-Ghalib is shown in the image.

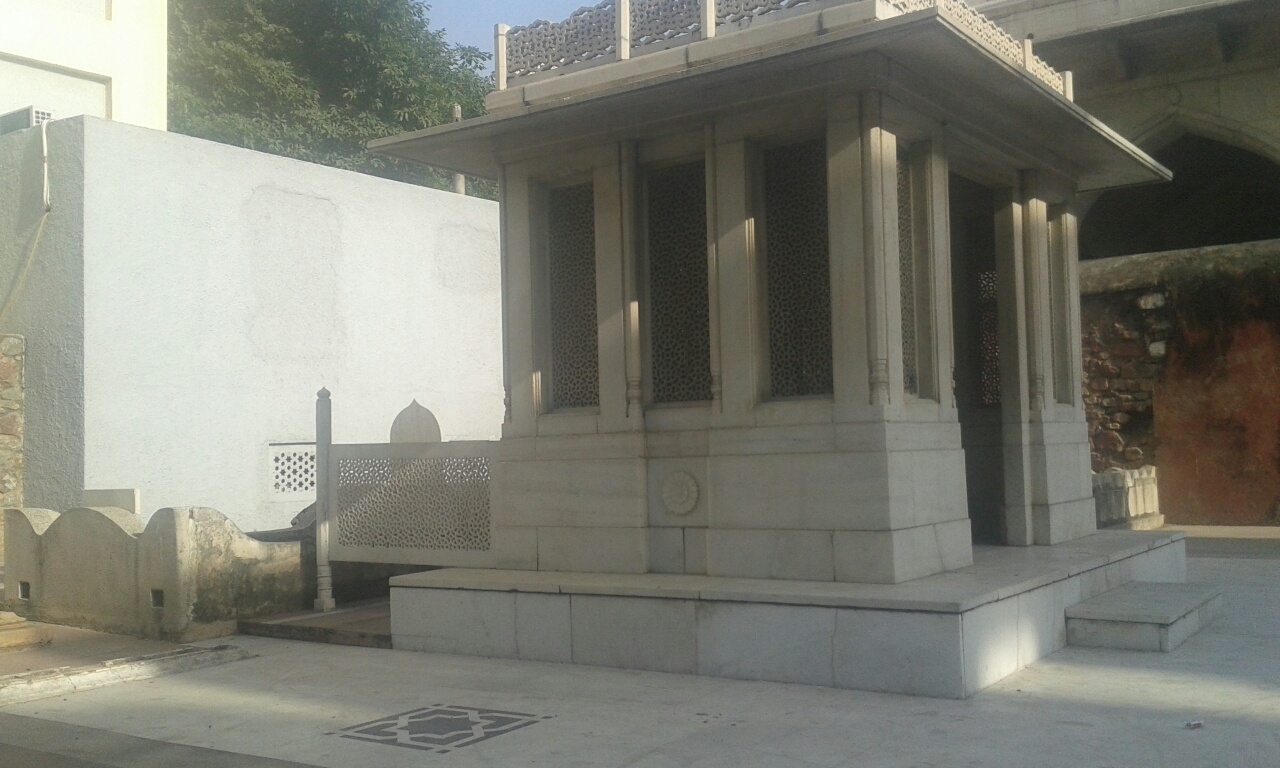
Side view of Mazar-e-Ghalib

مزے جہان کے اپنی نظر میں خاک نہیں
سواے خون جگر سو جگر میں خاک نہیں

Translation:

The happiness of the world is nothing for me
for my heart is left with no feeling besides blood.

Unique Style of writing

Ghalib is often famous for his unique and peculiar style of poetry. For example, he says

کوئی ویرانی سی ویرانی ہے
koī vīrānī sī vīrānī hai
دشت کو دیکھ کے گھر یاد آیا
dasht ko dekh ke ghar yaad aayā

This couplet has two meanings. On one hand, he says that there is loneliness all over the place, which is quite scary and makes him want to return to his secure and cosy home. On the other hand, a second meaning can be taken from this: there is this loneliness which resembles my home. My home is also a deserted place just like this one. That duality is something which Ghalib thrives on.

== Legacy ==
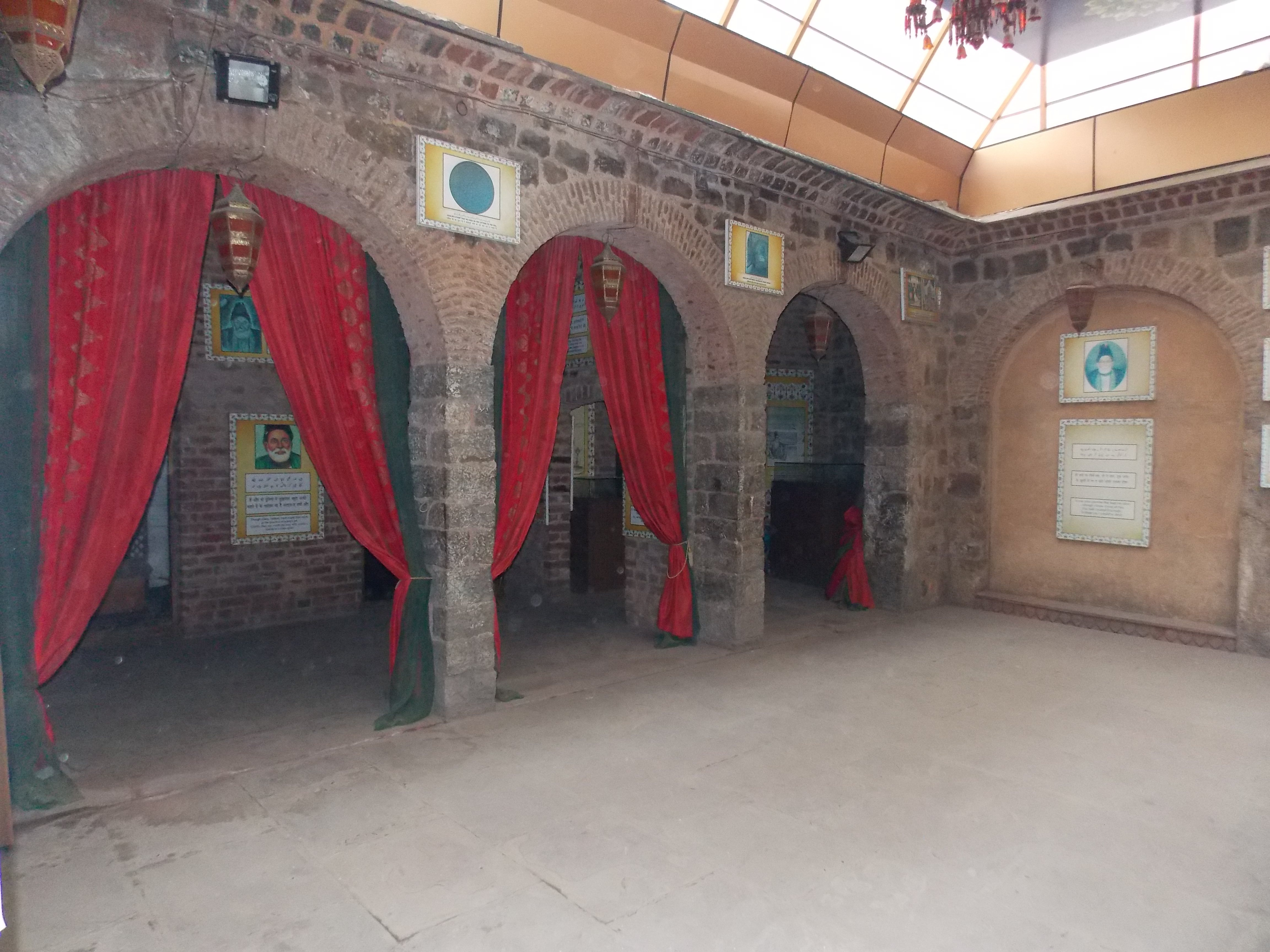
Ghalib ki Haveli, interior

He died in Delhi on 15 February 1869. The house where he lived in Gali Qasim Jaan, Ballimaran, Chandni Chowk, in Old Delhi known as the Ghalib ki Haveli is now a museum dedicated to him.

Ghazal maestros like Jagjit Singh, Mehdi Hassan, Iqbal Bano, Abida Parveen, Farida Khanum, Tina Sani, Madam Noor Jehan, Mohammed Rafi, Asha Bhosle, Begum Akhtar, Ghulam Ali, Lata Mangeshkar, Nusrat Fateh Ali Khan, Rahat Fateh Ali Khan have sung his ghazals.

=== Films and TV serial on Ghalib ===
Bharat Bhushan plays Ghalib and Suraiya plays his tawaif lover, Chaudvin in the film Mirza Ghalib (1954). The musical score of the film was composed by Ghulam Mohammed and his compositions of Ghalib's famous ghazals are likely to remain everlasting favorites.

A Pakistani film named Ghalib was released in 1961. The film was directed and produced by Ataullah Hashmi for S.K. Pictures. The music was composed by Tassaduq Hussain. The film starred Pakistani film superstar Sudhir playing Ghalib and Madam Noor Jehan playing his tawaif lover, Chaudvin. The film was released on 24 November 1961 and reached average status at the box-office, however, the music remains memorable in Pakistan to this day.

Gulzar produced a TV serial, Mirza Ghalib (1988), telecast on DD National. Naseeruddin Shah played the role of Ghalib in the serial, and it featured ghazals sung and composed by Jagjit Singh and Chitra Singh. The serial's music has since been recognised as Jagjit Singh and Chitra Singh's magnum opus, enjoying a cult following in the Indian subcontinent.

Another television show, Mirza Ghalib: The Playful Muse, aired on DD National in 1989; various ghazals by Ghalib were rendered in different musical styles by singers and musicians in each episode.

=== Stage plays on Ghalib ===
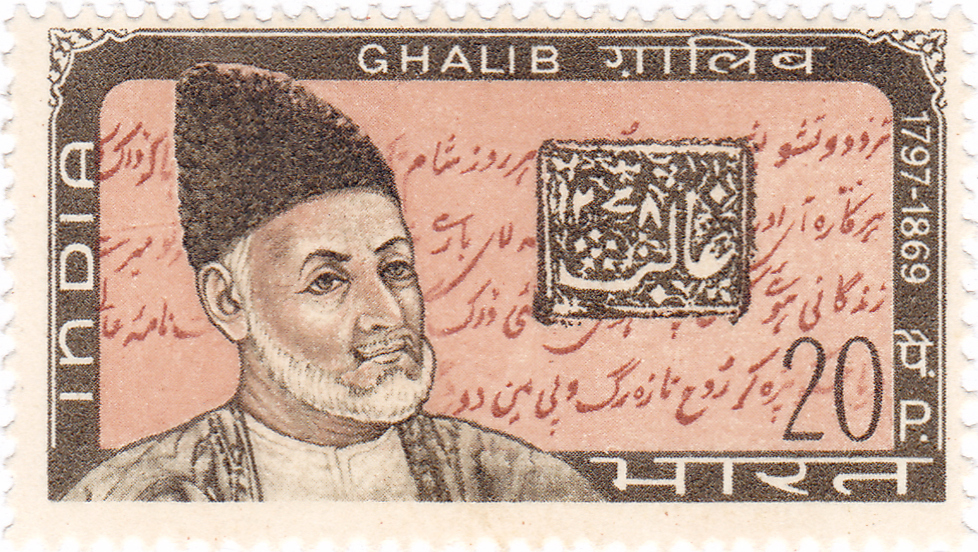
Ghalib on a 1969 stamp of India

Ghalib's life is the subject of hundreds of plays regularly performed in Northern India and Pakistan. These plays are based on his life and his personal and professional relationships.

Starting from the Parsi Theatre and Hindustani Theatre days, the first phase of his stage portrayal culminated in Sheila Bhatia's production, written by Mehdi Saheb. Mohd Ayub performed this role so many times that many theatre-goers used to call him Ghalib. The Sheila Bhatia production celebrated his famous ghazals which used to be presented one after another. Ghalib's character lacked subtlety and he was shown philandering with the courtesan, Chaudvin, famously played by Punjabi singer Madan Bala Sandhu. Later Begum Abida Ahmed, wife of the late President Fakhruddin Ali Ahmed, supported many very costly productions. This was perhaps the golden period of plays celebrating Ghalib's life, including many other productions such as Surendra Verma's play which was performed by the National School of Drama. Qaid-e-Hayat (Imprisonment of Life, 1983), written by Surendra Verma, talks about the personal life of the poet Ghalib, including his financial hardships and his tragic love for Katiba, a woman calligraphist, who was working on his diwan. Over the years, it has been directed by numerous theatre directors, including Ram Gopal Bajaj in 1989, at the National School of Drama. This period also saw numerous college and university productions performed by students' groups. Writers whose scripts were popular during this period include Jameel Shaidai, Danish Iqbal and Devender Singh. Ghalib also inspired a chain of comedies. One such classic comedy is Ghalib in New Delhi which has been staged more than three hundred times by Dr. Sayeed Alam. Danish Iqbal's play Main Gaya Waqt Nahin Hoon and Sayeed's play Ghalib Ke Khutoot are still being performed at various Indian cities. The name of play 'Main Gaya Waqt Nahin Hoon' was later changed to 'Anti-National Ghalib', which has had several successful shows in DelhiNCR. Now being produced under the banner of Aatrangi Pitaara Foundation.

The late Sheila Bhatia began this trend on productions about Ghalib, in Delhi.

=== Ghalib's poetry in films ===
The 2015 film Masaan contains various examples of poetry and shaayari by Ghalib, along with works by Akbar Allahabadi, Basheer Badr, Chakbast, and Dushyant Kumar. Explaining this as a conscious tribute, the film's lyricist Varun Grover explained that he wanted to show the character of Shaalu (played by Shweta Tripathi) as a person whose hobby is to read Hindi poetry and shaayari, as this is a common hobby of young people in Northern India, especially when in love, but this aspect is rarely shown in Hindi films.

=== Google Doodle ===
Ghalib was commemorated on his 220th birth anniversary by Search Engine Google which showed a special doodle on its Indian home page for him on 27 December 2017.

=== Statue in Jamia Millia Islamia, Delhi ===
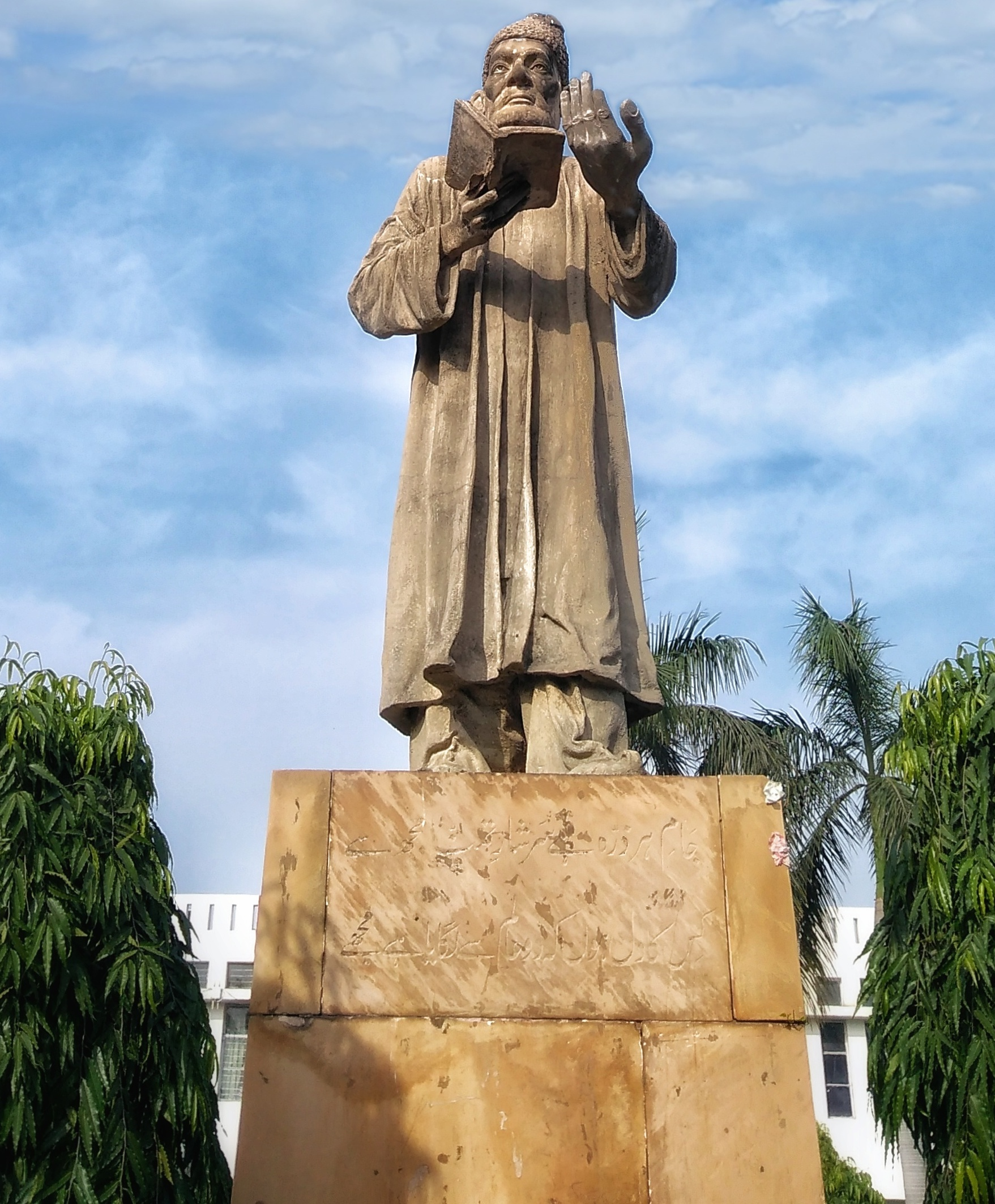
Ghalib Statue at the Jamia Millia Islamia

A statue of Ghalib was inaugurated in early 2000 in Jamia Millia Islamia in Delhi. The status depicts Mirza Ghalib as a great Urdu poet. It is located inside the gate number seven of the university campus.

=== Wall mural in Mumbai, India ===
Wall Mural of Mirza Ghalib at the junction of Mirza Ghalib Road in Nagpada, Mumbai, India, depicting the life and times of Ghalib and his impact on India

A wall mural (or relief) was inaugurated on 21 January 2019 at the Mirza Ghalib Road (formerly known as Clare Road) in the Nagpada Locality of Mumbai. The mural measuring 10 ft. x 42 ft. depicts Ghalibs life and his works. It also depicts the impact that Ghalib had on poetry and art in India. The mural is located outside a Municipal Garden near the Madanpura Area of Mumbai, which was once a hub for art, literature, writers and poets.

== See also ==
- Ghalib Study Centre, Ibn Sina Academy
- Ghalib Academy, New Delhi
- Mirza Ghalib College, Gaya
- Ghalib Museum, New Delhi
- List of Persian poets and authors
- Persian language in the Indian subcontinent
- List of Urdu language poets
- Urdu poetry
