= Rekhta =

Early term for the Hindustani language

- ریختہ रेख़्ता
- The poem of Ghalib, the notable poet of the 'Rekhta' dialect
- Region: Around Delhi
- Era: 13th-18th centuries
- Language family: Indo-European: Indo-Iranian; Indo-Aryan; Central Zone; Western Hindi; Hindustani; Rekhta
- Writing system: Perso-Arabic (Urdu alphabet); Nagari

Language codes
- ISO 639-3: –
- Glottolog: rekh1239

Rekhta (Urdu: ریختہ, Hindi: रेख़्ता; Hindustani pronunciation: [ˈɾeːxta(ː)]; Rēxta) was an early form of the Hindustani language. This style evolved in both the Perso-Arabic and Nagari scripts and is considered an early form of Standard Urdu and Modern Standard Hindi. According to the Pakistani linguist and historian Tariq Rehman, Rekhta was a highly Persianised variant of Hindustani, exclusively used by poets. It was not only the vocabulary that was Persianised, but also the poetic metaphors, inspired by Indian/Indic landscapes and seasons, were abandoned in favour of the Persian/Iranic ones, i.e. bahār (spring) replacing barsāt (rainy season).

The 13th century Indo-Persian Muslim poet Amir Khusrau used the term Hindavi (Persian: ھندوی, lit. 'of Hind or India') for the Rekhta dialect (the ancestor of Standard Urdu), the Persianised offshoot of the Apabhraṃśa vernacular Old Hindi, towards its emergence during the era of Delhi Sultanate, and gave shape to it in the Muslim literature, thus called "the father of Urdu literature". Other early Muslim poets, include Baba Farid, who contributed in the development of the language. Later from the 18th century, the dialect became a literary language and was further developed by the poets Mir Taqi Mir and Ghalib in the late Mughal Empire period, and the term eventually fell out of use and came to be known as Hindustani, by the end of the century.

== Etymology ==
Rekhta (from Persian verb ریختن rēxtan Persian pronunciation: [ˈɾeːxˈtan]) means "scattered" but also "mixed". The name was given to an early form of courtly literature in Delhi, where poems were made by combining Persian and early Hindustani (referred to as Kauravi, Khariboli, Dehlavi, Hindavi). Sometimes this was done by writing some lines of the poem in Persian, and others in Hindavi. Alternatively, both Persian and Hindavi could feature in a single line.

== Origin and usage ==
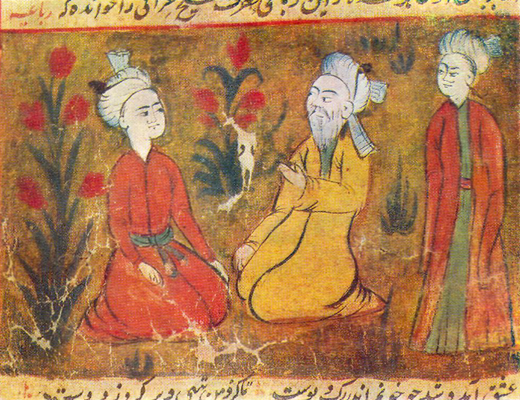
Amir Khusrau, a 13th-century Hindavi poet.

Rekhta arose in a period marked by extensive cultural interactions due to invasions, trade, and the establishment of Islamic courts in North India. As Persian became the language of administration, literature, and elite society under the Delhi Sultanate (1206–1526), and later the Mughal Empire (1526–1857), it began to interact with local vernaculars. The result was a blend that facilitated communication across classes and communities. Rekhta was the literary manifestation of this blend, gaining traction particularly in the courts of Delhi, Agra, and later Lucknow.

The literary form of Rekhta was composed in Perso-Arabic script (Nastaʿlīq) and in Devanagari, depending on the poet and regional influence. It was predominantly used in Ghazals, Masnavis, and Qawwalis, often conveying themes of love, loss, spirituality, and philosophical musings. While spoken Hindavi (or Hindavi boli) served as the lingua franca of North India, Rekhta emerged as a refined, urbane variant used for high literary expression.

Some scholars see Rekhta as part of a broader Indo-Persian cultural synthesis that defined much of medieval Indian literature. Persian was the prestige language, but Rekhta allowed Indian poets to write in a hybrid that could appeal to both elite and common audiences. This made it a unique cultural bridge across linguistic and religious communities.

As Hindavi began to evolve into a literary language in the 18th century, the new term Rekhta carried over to describe this language. It denoted the Persianised, "high" form of Hindavi used in poetry, as opposed to the speech of the common population. The word was used alongside names like Urdu and Hindi. Its usage in this sense lasted into the 19th century, as evidenced by a sher of Mirza Ghalib:

ريختہ کے تُم ہی اُستاد نہیں ہو غالِبؔ
کہتے ہیں اگلے زمانے میں کوئی مِیرؔ بھی تھا

Rēxtē kē tum hī ustād nahī̃ hō ġālib,
Kahtē haĩ aglē zamānē mē̃ kōī 'mīr' bhī thā

Translation:

You are not the sole grandmaster of Rekhta, Ghalib
They say, in the ages past, that there was one (called) Mir

[ɾeːxt̪eː keː t̪ʊm hiː ʊst̪aːd nəɦĩː ɦoː ɣaːlɪb]

[kɛht̪eː hɛ̃ː əɡleː zəmaneː mẽː koiː miːɾ bʰiː t̪ʰaː]

By the eighteenth century however, the term Rekhta had largely fallen out of use and terms like Hindi, Hindustani and Urdu were favored.

=== Zehal-e-Miskin ===
Zehal-e-Miskin is the first ghazal in Urdu literature, written by Amir Khusrau, through combining the Braj Bhasha (one of the dialects of the then Old Hindi language) and Persian. This Persianised combination was later known as Rekhta (the ancestor of Hindustani language). The poem effectively conveys the agony experienced due to the distance from the beloved. This sentiment is skillfully portrayed through a remarkable fusion of both languages, resulting in a harmonious blend that enhances the overall impact of the poem.

== See also ==
- Dobhashi
- Lisan ud-Dawat
- Persian and Urdu
- Persian language in the Indian subcontinent
- Rekhti
- Urdu poetry
