= Urdu literature =

Literary works written in Urdu language

Urdu literature اردو ادب
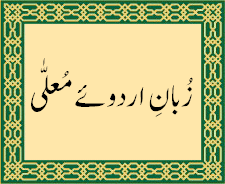

Urdu literature
- By category Urdu language Rekhta

Major figures
- Amir Khusrau - Wali Dakhani - Mir Taqi Mir - Ghalib - Abdul Haq - Muhammad Iqbal

Urdu writers
- Writers – Novelists – Poets

Forms
- Ghazal - Dastangoi - Nazm – Fiction

Institutions
- Anjuman-i Taraqqi-i Urdu; Urdu movement Literary Prizes

Urdu literature (Urdu: ادبیاتِ اُردُو, “Adbiyāt-i Urdū”) comprises the literary works, written in the Urdu language. While it tends to be dominated by poetry, especially the verse forms of the ghazal (غزل) and nazm (نظم), it has expanded into other styles of writing, including the short story, or afsana (افسانہ). Urdu literature is popular mostly in Pakistan and India, where the language holds official status.

== Origin ==
Urdu developed during the 12th to 13th centuries, although the name "Urdu" did not exist at the time for the language. Amir Khusrau, who lived in the thirteenth century, wrote and gave shape to the Rekhta dialect (the Persianized combination of Hindavi), which was the early form of Standard Urdu. He was thus called the "father of Urdu literature". The continuing traditions of Islam and patronage of foreign cultures centuries earlier by Muslim rulers, usually of Turkic or Afghan descent, marked their influence on the Urdu language given that both cultural heritages were strongly present throughout Urdu territory. The Urdu language, with a vocabulary almost evenly split between Sanskrit-derived Prakrit and Arabo-Persian words, was a reflection of this cultural amalgamation.

== Religious period (1350–1590) ==
Literary composition in Urdu first started in the Deccan in the 14th century. An early form of Urdu was first introduced in the Deccan by the soldiers of Alauddin Khalji who raided the Deccan from 1294 to 1311. In 1326, Muhammad bin Tughluq shifted his capital from Delhi to the Deccan and in 1347 Zafar Khan, his governor in the Deccan, declared independence, establishing the Bahmani Sultanate, and took the title of Ala-ud-Din Bahman Shah. The Bahmani sultans cultivated the use of Urdu in the kingdom as opposed to Persian which was the court language of the Delhi Sultanate. This dialect, which up to 1375 had no difference with Delhi Urdu, was influenced by local languages like Gujarati and Marathi and came to be known as Dakhini. The works composed during this period are mostly Dakhini prose and poetry on religious themes.

Important writers of this period include Bande Nawaz whose Miraj ul Asiquin, a Sufi tract, is one of the earliest works of Urdu prose. Other important writers included Shah Miranji and his son Shah Buran.

== Urdu in the Deccan (1590–1730) ==
=== Qutub Shahi poets (1590–1687) ===
Muhammad Quli Qutb Shah, the fifth sultan of the Qutb Shahi dynasty of Golkonda and founder of the city of Hyderabad, was a royal poet and prolific writer in Persian and Dakhini. Other poets included Wajhi and Gavvasi. In 1655, Ibn e Nishati wrote Phul ban, a romance in 1300 lines. Qissa o bairam e Gul andman written by Tab’i is an important work of the period. Written in 1670, it is nearly 2700 lines long.

=== Adil Shahi poets (1590–1688) ===
Ibrahim Adil Shah II was another royal poet who was also a patron of art and literature. His Kitab-e-Navras (Book of Nine Rasas) in Dakhani is a collection of 59 poems and 17 couplets. Other important poets included Rustami, Nusrati, and Mirza.

=== Urdu in Deccan under Mughal Rule (1687–1730) ===
The most important Urdu writer of this period was Wali Mohammed Wali.

== 18th century ==
=== First Urdu period in Delhi (1730–1830) ===
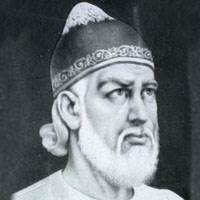
Ghulam Hamdani Mas'hafi, the poet first believed to have coined the name "Urdu" around 1780 AD for a language that went by a multiplicity of names before his time.

In the 18th century, the three most important forms of Urdu poetry were ghazal, the qasida, and the masnavi. Shaikh Zahuruddin Hatim was an important poet in Delhi during this period. His major works include two volumes of poetry, Diwan and Diwanzada. Urdu poetry was dominated by Mazhar, Sauda, Mir, and Dard, who later came to be known as “the Four Pillars of Urdu Poetry”. Another major figure was Mir Hasan, known for his masnavis, the most famous being Sihar-ul-Bayan, often referred to as Masnavi e Mir Hasan.

Other important poets of this period include Mas'hafi, Insha and Nazeer.

== 19th century ==
=== Poetry ===
==== Urdu poetry in Lucknow ====
During the nineteenth century, the centre of Urdu literature shifted from Delhi as most literary men migrated to other parts of India like Hyderabad, Patna, and Lucknow. The Lucknow court emerged as the centre of Urdu poetry as it received poets from Delhi with much enthusiasm. Chief among these poets were Khaliq, Zamir, Aatish, and Nasikh. Other poets included Anis and Dabir.

==== Second Urdu period in Delhi ====
The second quarter of the nineteenth century saw the revival of Urdu poetry in Delhi in the Mughal court. Bahadur Shah Zafar, the last Mughal Emperor, was himself a poet and a patron of poetry. Chief poets who flourished under his patronage includes Zauq, Ghalib, Azurda, and Momin.

Some of Momin's pupils in poetry such as Shefta and Mir Hussain Taskin became distinguished poets themselves.

==== New movement ====
The fall of the Mughal empire and kingdom of Awadh after the Rebellion of 1857 and the contact with English language started a new movement in Urdu literature. The flag bearers of this new movement were Syed Ahmad Khan, Muhammad Husain Azad, and Altaf Hussain Hali. This period saw the rise of prose, criticism, and drama in Urdu literature. Writers and poets began to explore new subjects and themes and experiment with new forms.

Altaf Hussain Hali was a prolific poet who left a vast amount of work behind. His major poetic works include Masnavis, Musaddas e Hali, Shikwa e Hind, and Qasida e Ghyasia. He also wrote marsias or elegies on the deaths of Ghalib, Hakim Mahmud Khan, and Sir Syed.

Suroor Jahanabadi was another exponent of the new movement in Urdu poetry. He wrote patriotic poems like Khak-i-Watan (The Dust of the Motherland), Urus-i-Hubbi-Watan (The Bride of the Love of the Country), and Madar-i-Hind (Mother of the Indus). His historical and religious poems include Padmani, Padmani-ki-Chita (Funeral Pyre of Padmani), and Sitaji-ki-Giria-o-Zari (The Laments of Sita).

=== Prose ===
Ghalib, better known for his poetry, also wrote a considerable amount of Urdu prose during his lifetime which includes his collection of letters and three short pamphlets entitled Lataif-i-Ghalib, Tegh-i-Tez, and Nama-i-Ghalib. His letters, autobiographical in nature, were collected and published in two volumes as Urdu-i-Mualla (the Royal Urdu) and Ud-i-Hindi (Fragrant Stick of the Indus).

==== Fort William College writers ====
Until the nineteenth century, Persian was the official language of the court and culture and all correspondence was carried out in Persian. The development of Urdu prose for practical purposes can be traced back to the establishment of the Fort William College in Calcutta in 1800 which was founded to instruct British officers of the East India Company in Indian vernacular languages. John Gilchrist, the head of the college, was author of many Hindustani works such as Oriental Linguist, an Introduction to the Language of Hindustani and Hindustani Grammar. He gathered a group of Indian scholars at the college who went on to write books for the use of fresh officers and also created a standard prose for Urdu and Hindi. The chief among these scholars were Mir Amman Dehelvi, Mir Sher Ali Jaafri, Mir Bahadur Ali Husaini, Sayid Haidar Bakhsh, Kazim Ali Jawan, Nihalchand, Hafizuddin Ahmad, Ikram Ali Khan, Lallujilal, Beni Narayan, and Mirza Ali Lutf.

==== Aligarh movement ====
Syed Ahmed Khan, the leading figure of the Aligarh Movement, was also a voracious writer and journalist who wrote various books from theological to historical subjects. His major theological work, Al-Khutbat al-Ahmadiya fi'l Arab wa'I Sirat al-Muhammadiya (A Series of Essays on the Life of Muhammad and Subjects Subsidiary Therein), was published in 1876. He made significant contributions to Urdu journalism through his journals and periodicals, Tehzeeb-ul-Akhlaq and the Aligarh Institute Gazette.

The Aligarh movement produced a band of literary enthusiasts who had a far-reaching influence on Urdu literature. The chief among them were Shibli Nomani and Zakaullah Dehlvi who wrote on history, Chiragh Ali, Mohsin-ul-Mulk, and Waqar-ul-Mulk who wrote on literature.

Shibli Nomani is regarded as the father of modern history in Urdu. He wrote several biographical and historical books such as Sirat-un-Nabi, Sirat an-Nu'man, Al-Farooq, Al-Ma'mun, Al-Ghazali, (a biography of Imam Al-Ghazali), Mawlana Rumi (a biography of Mawlana Rumi), and Aurangzeb Alamgir Par Ek Nazar, a book on the life of Mughal emperor Aurangzeb. He also wrote the first travelogue in Urdu, Safar Nama e Rome-o-Misr-o-Sham, which is an account of his travels abroad.

Tarikh-e-Hindustan, a fourteen-volume compilation of Indian history in Urdu written by Zakaullah Dehlvi, was a monumental achievement of this period.

Apart from poetry, Altaf Hussain Hali also made significant contributions to Urdu prose. Hayat-i Saadi, a biography of Saadi, Hayat-i Javed, a biography of Syed Ahmad Khan, and Yadgar-e-Ghalib, a biography and criticism on Ghalib, are some of his most important works in prose.

==== Urdu novel ====
In 1869, Nazir Ahmad Dehlvi published Mirat-ul-Uroos, the first original novel in Urdu. It served as Nazir's form of conduct literature about marriage. He also wrote Binat-un-Nash and Toba tun Nasoh during this period, both of which are conduct books designed to instill moral virtues.

Muhammad Husain Azad laid the foundation of historical novels in Urdu with Qisas ul-hind and Darbār-e akbarī. His Aab-e hayat, which is a history of Urdu poetry from Wali to Ghalib, is regarded as the first chronological history of Urdu poetry.

Ratan Nath Dhar Sarshar introduced proper fiction and touch of realism in Urdu novels with his serialised novel Fasana-e-Azad which was influenced by Don Quixote. His other notable novels are Sair-i-Kohsar and Jam-i-Sarshar. He also wrote articles and short stories for the humorous journal, Awadh Punch.

Influenced by the historical romances of Walter Scott, Abdul Halim Sharar introduced historical elements in his own works such as Malikul Azia Vārjina.

Mirza Hadi Ruswa was a poet and writer, best remembered for his novel Umrao Jaan Ada, published at the end of the nineteenth century.

=== Drama ===
Drama in Urdu was introduced in the 19th century through the production of Inder Sabha written by Agha Hasan Amanat, and first staged in 1853. It was a musical comedy with a thin plot line and was modelled after the European opera.

== 20th century ==
=== Prose ===
==== Age of Premchand ====
Premchand emerged on the literary scene in the early 1890s and soon became probably the most significant writer and novelist in the history of Urdu literature. He also wrote in Hindi. He wrote on the themes of religious and social reforms in Isare-e-Muabid and Hum Khurma-O Hum Swab, on the predicament of a prostitute in Bazaar-e-Husn, the problems of the farmers in Gosha-e Aafiat, and the problems of the middle class and women in Nirmala. Premchand was also the first writer to introduce European-style short stories in Urdu. His first collection of short stories, Soz-e- Watan, published in 1907, was banned by the British government.

Other major writers during this period include Sudarshan, Mohammad Mehdi Taskeen, Qazi Abdul Gaffar, Majnun Gorakhpuri, Niaz Fatehpuri, Krishan Prasad Kaul, and L.M. Ahmed.

==== Progressive Writers’ Movement ====
In the 1930s, the short story(afsana) became the leading prose genre in Urdu due to the influx of western influences especially the English, French, and Russian. The publication of Angarey, a short story collection by Sajjad Zaheer, Rashid Jahan, Mahmud-uz-Zafar, and Ahmed Ali in 1932 marked the beginning of the Progressive Writers' Movement that went on to substantially influence the content of Urdu literature for the next two decades.

Ismat Chughtai was an important progressive novelist and short story writer who wrote extensively on femininity. Her major works include the collection of short stories Kaliyan and Chotein. She is best remembered for her short story Lihaaf published in 1942.

Krishan Chander realistically portrayed life in his novels and stories such as Ek Gadhe ki Sargushisht, Shikast, Zindagi ke Mor Par, Hum Waishi Hain, Anna Datta, Kalu Bhangi, and Paude.

Another leading writer of this period was Saadat Hasan Manto who wrote elaborately drawn stories like Khol do, Toba Tek Singh, Mozelle, and Thanda Gosht.

== Special contributors ==
Amir Khusrau exercised great influence on the initial growth of not only Urdu literature, but the language itself (which only truly took shape as distinguished from both Persian and Old Hindi during the late 13th century). He is credited with the systematization of northern Indian classical music, including Hindustani music, and he wrote works both in Persian and Hindavi. While the couplets that come down from him are representative of a latter-Prakrit Hindi bereft of Arabo-Persian vocabulary, his influence on court viziers and writers must have been transcendental, for a century after his death Quli Qutub Shah was speaking a language that might be considered to be Urdu. Sultan Muhammed Quli Qutb Shah was a scholar in Persian and Arabic. He also wrote poetry in Telugu language, Persian language and Urdu language. His poetry has been compiled into Dewan or volume entitled "Kulliyat-e-Quli Qutub Shah." Muhammed Quli Qutub Shah had the distinction of being the first Saheb-e-dewan Urdu poet and is credited with introducing a new sensibility into prevailing genres of Persian/Urdu poetry. It is said that the Urdu language acquired the status of a literary language due to his contributions. He died in the year 1611.

Sayyid Shamsullah Qadri is considered as the first researcher of Deccaniyat. Some of the works of Allama Hakeem Sayyid Shamsullah Qadri are Salateen-e-Muabber 1929, Urdu-e-Qadeem 1930, Tareekh-e-Maleebaar, Mowarrikheen-e-Hind, Tahfat al Mujahidin 1931, Imadiya, Nizam Ut Tawareekh, Tareekh Zuban Urdu-Urdu-e-Qadeem, Tareekh Zuban Urdu Al Musamma Ba Urdu-e-Qadeem, Tareekh Zuban Urdu Yaani Urdu-e-Qadeem, Tarikh Vol III, Asaarul Karaam, Tarikh Shijrah Asifiya, Ahleyaar, and Pracina Malabar.

== Dāstāngoi (epics) ==
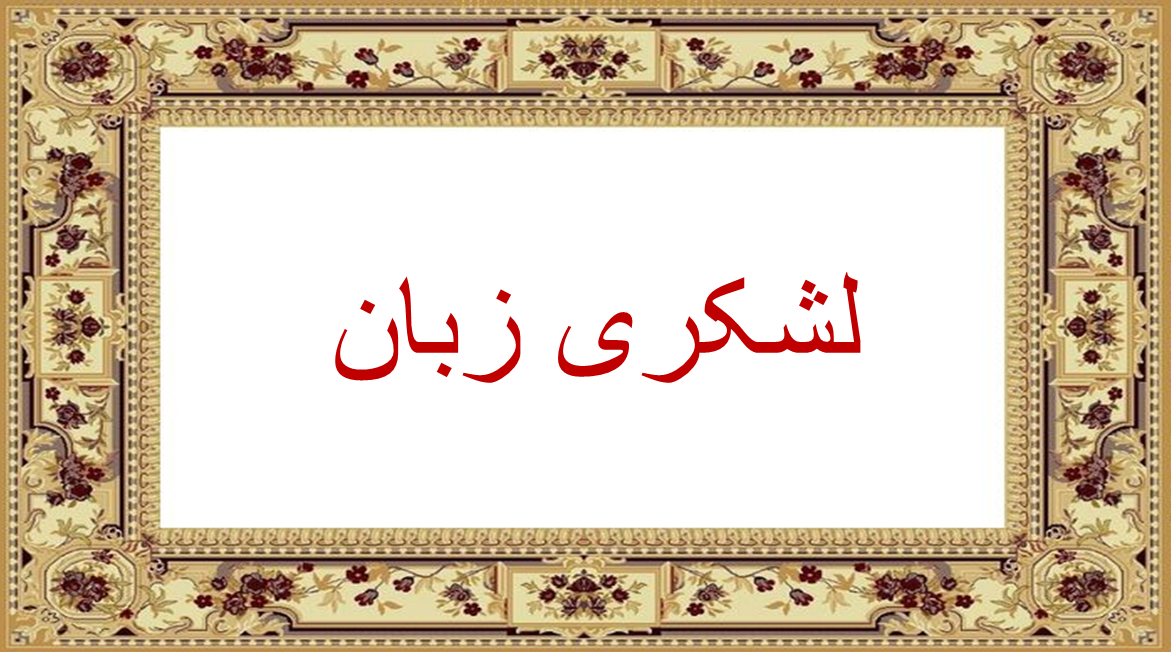
Lashkari Zaban calligraphy

Urdu literature was generally composed more of poetry than of prose. The prose component of Urdu literature was mainly restricted to the ancient form of epic stories called dāstān (داستان). These long stories have complicated plots that deal with magical and otherwise fantastic creatures and events.

The genre originated in the Middle East and was disseminated by folk storytellers. It was assimilated by individual authors. Dastan plots are based both on folklore and classical literary subjects. Dastan was particularly popular in Urdu literature, typologically close to other narrative genres in Eastern literatures, such as Persian masnawi, Punjabi qissa, Sindhi waqayati bait, etc., and also reminiscent of the European novel. The oldest known Urdu dastans are Dastan-i-Amir Hamza, recorded in the early seventeenth century, and Bustan-i Khayal (The Garden of Imagination or The Garden of Khayal) by Mir Taqi Khayal (d. 1760). Most of the narrative dastans were recorded in the early nineteenth century, representing the inclusion of 'wandering' motifs borrowed from the folklore of the Middle East, central Asia and northern India. These include Bagh-o-Bahar (The Garden and Spring) by Mir Amman, Mazhab-i-Ishq (The Religion of Love) by Nihalchand Lahori, Araish-i-Mahfil (The Adornment of the Assembly) by Hyderbakhsh Hyderi, and Gulzar-i-Chin (The Flower Bed of Chin) by Khalil Ali Khan Ashq. Other famous Urdu dastans include Nau Tarz-i Murassa‘ by Husain ‘Atā Khān Tahsīn, Nau Ā'īn-i Hindī (Qissa-i Malik Mahmūd Gīti-Afroz) by Mihr Chand Khatrī, Jazb-i ‘ishq by Shāh Husain Haqīqat, Nau Tarz-i Murassa‘ by Muhammad Hādī (a.k.a. Mirzā Mughal Ghāfil), and Talism Hoshruba by Muhammad Husain Azad.

== Tazkiras (narrations) ==
Tazkiras (تذکیرہ) are compilations of literary memoirs that include verses and maxims of the great poets along with biographical information and commentaries on their styles. They are often a collection of names with a line or two of information about each poet, followed by specifics about his composition. Some of these tazkiras give biographical details, and a little idea of the style or poetical power is transmitted. Even the large anthologies do not systematically review an author's work. Most of them have the names in alphabetical order, but one or two are ordered by historical chronology. The majority quote only lyrics, and the quotations are usually chosen randomly.

== Poetry ==
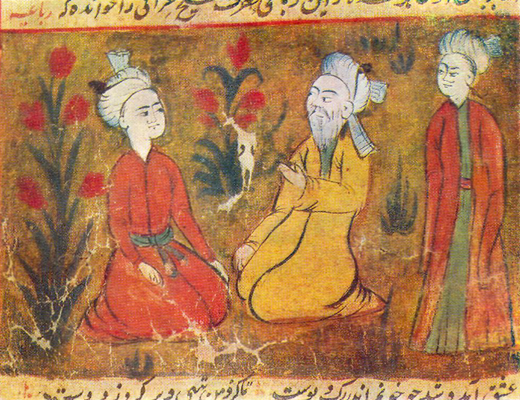
Amir Khusrau, a 13th-century Urdu poet.

Urdu poetry (Urdu: شاعری), reached its peak in the 19th century. The most well-developed form of poetry is the ghazal, known for its quality and quantity within the Urdu tradition.

=== Sonnets ===
Urdu poets influenced by English and other European-language poetry began writing sonnets in Urdu in the early 20th century. Azmatullah Khan (1887-1923) is believed to have introduced this format to Urdu poetry. Other renowned Urdu poets who wrote sonnets are Akhtar Junagarhi, Akhtar Sheerani, Noon Meem Rashid, Mehr Lal Soni Zia Fatehabadi, Salaam Machhalishahari and Wazir Agha.

== Novels ==
Initially, Urdu novels focused on urban social life, eventually widening in scope to include rural social life. They also covered the changing times under the progressive writing movement inspired by Sajjad Zaheer. However, the partition of India had a great impact on the novel, bringing up questions of identity and migration as can be seen in the major works of Abdullah Hussain and Quratul Ain Haider. Towards the end of the last century the novel took a serious turn towards the contemporary life and realities of the young generations of India. The most significant novels of the current generation of Indian novelists in Urdu, which demonstrate a new confidence in contemporary life, are Makaan by Paigham Afaqui, Do Gaz Zameen by Abdus Samad, and Pani by Ghazanfer. These works, especially Makaan, brought the Urdu novel out of the prevailing themes of partition and identity issues and took it into the realm of modern-day realities and issues of life in India. Makaan had an impact on many English writers such as Vikram Seth, who turned to novel writing. These Urdu novels further impacted significant works such as Andhere Pag by Sarwat Khan, Numberdar Ka Neela by S M Ashraf and Fire Area by Ilyas Ahmed Gaddi. Paigham Afaqui's second major novel, Paleeta, was published in 2011 and depicts the tension of the political sickening of a common Indian citizen in the six decades after India's independence. Bewildered by the disappointing state of democracy and the transformation of Indian society into a mental desert the central character dies after leaving behind his writings which catch fire.

=== Famous novels ===
- Mirat-ul-Uroos (The Bride's Mirror; 1868–1869) by Deputy Nazeer Ahmed is regarded as the first novel in Urdu. Within twenty years of publication over 100,000 copies had been printed; and was also translated into Bengali, Braj, Kashmiri, Punjabi, and Gujarati. It has never been out of print in Urdu. In 1903 an English translation was published in London by G. E. Ward.
- Umrao Jaan Ada by Mirza Hadi Ruswa is considered the first Urdu novel by many critics.
- Binat-ul-Nash (The Daughters of the Bier, a name for the constellation Ursa Major) is another novel by Deputy Nazeer Ahmed. It was his 2nd novel after Mirat-tul-uroos. Like Mira-tul-Uroos, this novel is also on the education of women and their character building.
- Zindagi (Everything Happens in Life; 1933–1934) by Chaudhry Afzal Haq describes the ups and downs of life for developing moral values and guidance of young people. His entire work is full of the teaching of moral values.
- Taubat-un-Nasuh (Repentance of Nasuh; 1873–1874) by Deputy Nazeer Ahmed also focused on moral lessons for youth.
- Fasaana-e-Mubtalaa (1885) was another novel for developing moral values and guidance for youth.
- Jasoosi Dunya and Imran series by Ibn-e-Safi
- Aag Ka Darya by Quratulain Haider
- Chalta Musafir by Altaf Fatima
- Aangan by Khadija Mastoor
- Udaas Naslain by Abdullah Hussain
- Jangloos by Shaukat Siddiqui
- Daira by Muhammad Asim Butt
- Pir-e-Kamil by Umera Ahmad
- Khuda Ke Saaye Mein Ankh Micholi by Rahman Abbas
- Ek Mamnua Muhabbat Ki Kahani by Rahman Abbas
- Rohzin by Rahman Abbas

In the first decade of twenty first century, Rahman Abbas has emerged as most influential Urdu fiction writer. The Hindu writes about work of Rahman Abbas, "With his uncanny ability to subvert what people believe, Rehman Abbas raises the art of story-telling to a new level."

=== Short stories (afsanah nigari) ===
Urdu literature has included the short story form for slightly more than one hundred years. During this period it has passed through some major phases including the early romantic period, progressive writings, modernist writings, and the current phase. Although a number of male and female writers wrote short stories during the first phase(including both romantic stories and social criticisms), the short story crystallized as a regular part of Urdu literature in the growth of the writings of Munshi Premchand. His notable short stories include "Kafan" and "Poos Ki Raat". The Urdu short story gained momentum with the phenomenal publication of Angare, a collection of many writers towards the end of the life of Premchand. Writers like Ghulam Abbas, Manto, Rajinder Singh Bedi, Krishan Chander and Ismat Chughtai, to name but a few, turned the short story into a major genre of Urdu literature.

The next generation of Urdu short story writers included Qurratulain Hyder, Qazi Abdul Sattar and Joginder Paul. The short story tradition continues with younger generation writers like Zahida Hina, Paigham Afaqui, Syed Muhammad Ashraf, Salam Bin Razzaq, Naeem Baig, Akhlaq Ahmed Khan, Moinuddin Jinabade, as well as notable women writers like Afra Bukhari and Wajida Tabassum.

Urdu short stories have dealt with a wide range of the dimensions of life, but the most famous stories concern the trauma of the partition of the sub-continent and the violence generated out of it. Towards the end of the last century, short stories became grounded in the complexity of daily life which can be seen in the unique collection of short stories in Paigham Afaqui's Mafia. An entirely different approach is seen in the collection of short stories T'abir by Moinuddin Jinabade and Taus Chaman Ka Maina by Nayyer Masood.

== Drama ==
Urdu drama evolved from the prevailing dramatic traditions of North India raas as practiced by exponents like Nawab Wajid Ali Shah of Awadh. His dramatic experiments led to the famous Inder Sabha of Amanat and later this tradition took the shape of Parsi Theatre. Agha Hashr Kashmiri is the culmination of this tradition.

Urdu theater traditions have greatly influenced modern Indian theatre. Among all the languages, Urdu (which was called Hindi "meaning:Language of the Hind" by some early writers), along with Gujarati, Marathi, and Bengali theatres have remained popular. Many Urdu dramas have also been made into films.

Classic playwrights include Prof Hasan, Ghulam Jeelani, J. N. Kaushal, Shameem Hanfi and Jameel Shaidayi. Danish Iqbal, Sayeed Alam, Shahid Anwar, Iqbal Niyazi and Anwar are a few of the post-modern playwrights actively contributing to Urdu drama.

Sayeed Alam is known for his wit and humour in plays like Ghalib in New Delhi, Maulana Azad and Big B.

Danish Iqbal's Dara Shikoh, directed by M S Sathyu, is considered a modern classic for its use of newer theatre techniques and a contemporary perspective. His other plays are Sahir, on the famous lyricist and revolutionary poet; Kuchh Ishq kiya Kuchh Kaam, a Celebration of the Faiz's poetry, featuring events from the early part of his life, particularly the events and incidents of pre-partition days which shaped his life and ideals; and Chand Roz Aur Meri Jaan, another play inspired from Faiz's letters written from various jails during the Rawalpindi Conspiracy days. He has written 14 other plays including Dilli Jo Ek Shehr Thaa and Main Gaya Waqt Nahin hoon.

Shahid's Three B is also a significant play. He has been associated with many groups including 'Natwa'. Zaheer Anwar has kept the flag of Urdu Theatre flying in Kolkata. Unlike the writers of the previous generation, Sayeed, Shahid, Iqbal, and Zaheer do not write bookish plays but rather their work is a product of a vigorous performing tradition. Iqbal Niyazi of Mumbai has written several plays in Urdu. His play Aur Kitne Jalyanwala Baugh?? won several awards. Hence this is the only generation after Amanat and Agha Hashr who actually write for the stage and not for libraries.

== Literary movements ==
=== Progressive Writers Movement ===
According to The Dawn, the Progressive Writers Movement in Urdu literature was the strongest movement after Sir Syed's education movement.

=== Modernism ===
The modernist movement started in Urdu literature around 1960. This movement laid more stress on symbolic and other indirect expressions as opposed to direct and clear expressions. The most well-known names in this movement included Shamsur Rehman Farooqui and Gopichand Narang and the poets Noon Meem Rashid and Meeraji. Apart from them, a number of other poets like Zafer Iqbal, Nasir Kazmi, Bashir Bader and Shahryar are related to this movement.

=== Halqa e Arbab e Zauq ===
Halqa e Arbab e Zauq was a literary movement begun in Lahore, British Raj in 1939. Early members included poets Noon Meem Rashid, Zia Jallandhari, Muhtar Siddiqui, Hafeez Hoshiarpuri and Meeraji, brought to the meeting by his friend, Qayyum Nazar, an active member of the group. The Halqa was the second modern literary movement in Urdu poetry in the 20th century, founded just a couple of years after the leftist Progressive Writers' Movement, and is considered to be the most influential group on modern poetry in the Urdu Language.

=== Post-modernism ===
Post-modernism was introduced to Urdu literature by Gopi Chand Narang. Many other critics in Urdu literature are also attached to this approach to criticism. Post-modernism does not claim to be a movement and does not demand any writer to adopt a particular style of writing. It generally concentrates on a method of understanding contemporary literature in the light of its content—mostly examining features like feminism, Dalit, regional and other types of literature as opposed to seeking uniformity in the global literature on the basis of internationally established trends.

=== Independent writers ===
By the end of the 1980s the atmosphere in Urdu literature became very depressing. The progressive movement was almost dead and the modernist movement had started running out of ideas. But this was also the time for an upsurge of new creative forces rooted in the new life that was metamorphosing the socio-economic and political climate in the sub-continent. It was under this climate that a new era of fiction started with the publication of Paigham Afaqui's novel Makaan. Afaqui and other writers refused to be identified by any movement and displayed complete independence in using personally developed styles and techniques for writing novels and explored their own philosophy and vision of life. It was a serious departure from the theme of partition which dominated writers like Qurtul Ain haider and Abdullah Hussain and the theme of existentialism which was the benchmark of modernism. Writers like Ghazanfer and Musharraf Alam Zauqi have further widened the horizons of new themes and concerns.

=== Theatre of the Absurd ===
Theatre of the Absurd is a new and somewhat rare genre in the history of Urdu literature. The first play of the genre was written and published by the Pakistan research-writer, poet, lawyer and columnist Mujtaba Haider Zaidi in December 2008 under the title Mazaron Ke Phool (i.e. Graveyard Flowers).

== Classical literature vs. popular literature ==
There is an old distinction of classical literature (ادبِ عالیہ) and popular literature (مقبولِ عام ادب) in Urdu language, where the popular writers of digests/magazines are discriminated somewhat as a "lower caste". While the literary critics are still reluctant to acknowledge the popular writers, nevertheless, the contributions of Ibn-e-Safi and other writers like Mohiuddin Nawab, Ilyas Sitapuri, MA Rahat, Ishtiaq Ahmed, and many others, to Urdu literature cannot be ignored.

== See also ==
- Urdu poetry
- List of Urdu language poets
- List of Urdu writers
- Pakistani literature
- Progressive Writers' Movement
- List of countries and territories where Hindustani is an official language
- Hindustani orthography

== Cited sources ==
- Bailey, Thomas Grahame (1932). A History of Urdu Literature (PDF). Association Press (Y.M.C.A.). ISBN 978-81-7000-080-8.
- Russell, Ralph; Islam, Khurshidul (1968). Three Mughal Poets: Mir, Sauda, Mir Hasan. Harvard University Press. ISBN 978-0-674-88980-4.
- Saksena, Ram Babu (1927). A History of Urdu Literature. Ram Narain Lal. ISBN 978-81-7435-161-6.
- Sud, K.N. (1977). "Urdu Fiction and Krishan Chandar". Indian Literature. 20 (4): 122–127. ISSN 0019-5804. JSTOR 24158701.
- Ahmad, Aziz (1969). An Intellectual History of Islam in India. Edinburgh University Press. p. 110. ISBN 978-0-85224-057-1.
- Komal, Balraj (2002). "Twentieth Century Urdu Novel". Indian Literature. 46 (2 (208)): 157–167. ISSN 0019-5804. JSTOR 23345740.
- Flemming, Leslie A. (1985). Another Lonely Voice: The Life and Works of Saadat Hassan Manto. Vanguard Books.
- Narang, G.C. (1973). "Major Trends in the Urdu Short Story". Indian Literature. 16 (1/2): 113–132. ISSN 0019-5804. JSTOR 24157434.
- Sadiq, Muhammad (1995). A history of Urdu literature. Internet Archive. Delhi; Oxford : Oxford University Press. ISBN 978-0-19-563145-6.
- Tahir, Mohd. "Foundation, Derivation, and Evolution of Urdu Language and Literature up to 1857." Kala: The Journal of Indian Arts History Congress. Vol. 27. No. 1. 2021.
