= Makers of Indian Literature =

Series of biographical monographs published by Sahitya Akademi, New Delhi

- Monograph on Swami Vivekananda written by Nemai Sadhan Bose
- Country: India
- Discipline: Indian literature
- Publisher: Sahitya Akademi

Makers of Indian Literature is a series of biographical monographs published by Sahitya Akademi, India's National Academy of Letters.

== Background ==
In 1964, the Sahitya Akademi, India's National Academy of Letters, decided to publish the first in a series of monographs on writers who had made significant contributions to the development of literature in an Indian language. The Sahita Akademi planned to title the series Indian Men of Letters. Among the authors invited to contribute to the series was C. Rajagopalachari, who was asked to write on the ancient Tamil poet Thiruvalluvar. Responding to the request, Rajagopalachari objected to classifying Thiruvalluvar as one of the "Indian Men of Letters". He felt that the series' title should be changed if rishis and sages such as Valmiki and Tulsidas were to be included. Alternative titles were considered. Eventually, in order to encompass both old and modern writers, from sages and rishis to men of letters, the series was named Makers of Indian Literature.

Krishna Kripalani prepared detailed guidelines for the authors to ensure a measure of uniformity.

Each volume was to be of about 80 printed pages, or 30,000 words. They were intended primarily for the general reader who had not necessarily read the work of the writer concerned, and might not be burdened with references and allusions more likely to deter than hold the attention of the target audience. The story of the life and work of the writer concerned was to be told simply and lucidly and in such a manner as to convince the reader of the historic significance of their contribution to Indian literature. The merit of an author's worth and the quality of their work was to be established on the evidence of the totality of their contribution. This was to be assessed in the context of the age in which they had lived and, if possible, in the context of Indian heritage as a whole. Selected passages from works discussed were to be interwoven with the narrative, in order to assist the reader to appreciate the author's style and mode of expression.

== Monographs ==
Within twenty years, 120 monographs, on figures who wrote in 20 languages, were published by the Sahitya Akademi. A total of 250 translated volumes were also published, in 13 languages. The next 20 years saw the publication of a further 531 monographs, on historical figures who wrote in a further 21 languages; as well as 586 translations. Of the 651 monographs published up to 2003, 274 were originally written in English; 96 in Hindi; 51 in Urdu; 41 in Tamil; 28 each in Kashmiri and Maithili; 27 in Kannada; 15 each in Bengali and Rajasthani; 14 each in Marathi and Telugu; 10 in Gujarati; seven in Odia; six each in Malayalam and Sindhi; five in Nepali; four each in Assamese and Dogri; two each in Konkani, Punjabi and Sanskrit. Of the 836 translations, Hindi was the most common, with 151 volumes being translated into it; followed by Tamil, 98; Kannada 76; Telugu 70; and Urdu 63.

== List of monographs ==
The authors included in the series cover a wide range:

Assamese

- Krishnakanta Handiqui

Bengali

- Jibanananda Das
- Sukanta Bhattacharya
- Kazi Nazrul Islam
- Buddhadeva Bose
- Bankim Chandra Chatterjee
- Manik Bandopadhyay
- Tarasankar Banerji
- Raja Rammohun Roy
- Maharshi Debendranath Tagore
- Iswarchandra Vidyasagar

English

- Sarojini Naidu
- Toru Dutt
- Manmohan Ghose
- Sri Aurobindo

Gujarati

- Shamal
- Akho
- Dayārām
- Dalpatram
- Narmadashankar
- Mahipatram
- Govardhanram
- Manilal Dvivedi
- Kalapi
- Kant
- Nanalal
- B. K. Thakore
- Meghani
- Harivallabh Bhayani
- C. C. Mehta
- Harindra Dave
- Niranjan Bhagat

Hindi

- Kabir
- Ravidas
- Jaishankar Prasad
- Premchand
- Bharatendu Harischandra

Kannada

- Basavesvara
- B. M. Srikantayya
- Panje Mangesh Rao

Kashmiri

- Zinda Kaul
- Habba Khatoon

Malayalam

- Asan
- Ulloor
- Vallathol
- A.R. Rajaraja Varma
- Chandu Menon

Marathi

- Jnanadev
- Namdev
- Dattakavi
- Kesavsut
- H.N. Apte
- Sripad Krishna Kolhatkar
- Purushottam Shivaram Rege

Odia

- Saraladasa
- Radhanath Ray

Punjabi

- Baba Farid
- Bhai Vir Singh
- Giani Gurdit Singh

Rajasthani

- Mirabai

Sanskrit

- Bhavabhuti
- Jayadeva
- Bhāsa

Tamil

- Ilango Adigal
- Kamban
- Bharati

Telugu

- Vemana
- Dr. C.R. Reddy
- Veeresalingam

Urdu

- Aale Ahmad Suroor
- Abdul Ghafoor Nassakh
- Abdul Halim Sharar
- Abdul Majid Daryabadi
- Abul Kalam Azad
- Akbar Allahabadi
- Ali Jawad Zaidi
- Abdul Haq
- Abdul Aleem
- Altaf Hussain Hali
- Arsh Malsiani
- Arzoo Lakhnavi
- Balraj Komal
- Bulleh Shah
- Dagh Dehlvi
- Firaq Gorakhpuri
- Ghulam Hamdani Mas'hafi
- Hasrat Mohani
- Insha Allah Khan
- Ismail Merathi
- Jigar Moradabadi
- Josh Malsiyani
- Khaleel-Ur-Rehman Azmi
- Khwaja Haidar Ali Aatish
- Khwaja Ahmad Abbas
- Khwaja Hasan Nizami
- Khwaja Mir Dard
- Krishan Chander
- Majrooh Sultanpuri
- Majaz Lakhnavi
- Makhdoom Mohiuddin
- Mohammad Ali Jauhar
- Mazhar Imam
- Mir Anees
- Mir Taqi Mir
- Mirza Farhatullah Baig
- Mirza Ghalib
- Mirza Muhammad Rafi Sauda
- Muhammad Quli Qutb Shah
- Muhammad Husain Azad
- Nazir Akbarabadi
- Niaz Fatehpuri
- Shibli Nomani
- Syed Waheed Akhtar
- Syed Masud Hasan Rizvi Adeeb
- Saadat Hasan Manto
- Shad Azimabadi
- Sohail Azimabadi
- Suroor Jahanabadi
- Syed Mohiuddin Qadri Zore
- Yagana Changezi
- Yusuf Husain
- Zakir Husain
