= Meer Khaleeq =

Indian Urdu Poet

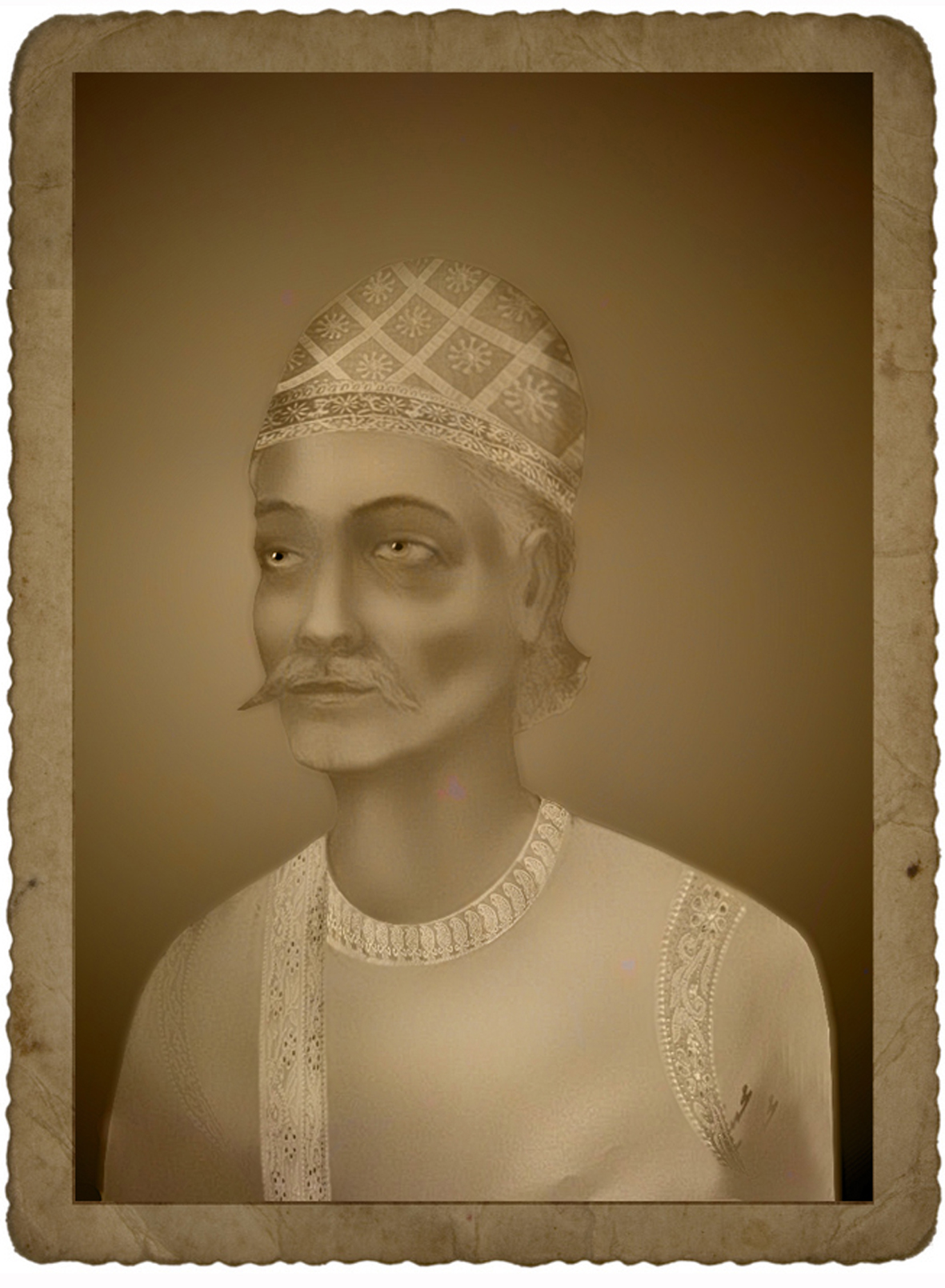
- Born: Meer Mustahsan; 1766; Faizabad, Awadh (present day Uttar Pradesh, India)
- Died: 1844 (aged 77–78)
- Relatives: Meer Hasan (father), Meer Khulq (brother), Meer Anees (son)
- Writing career
- Pen name: Khaleeq خلیق
- Genres: Marsiya, Ghazal

Meer Mustahsan 'Khaleeq' (1766–1844) (Urdu: میر مستحسن خلیق) was an 18th-century Urdu poet. Khaleeq belonged to a family of Urdu poets who specialised in writing elegies or marsiyas. Khaleeq was the son of Meer Hasan, and the father of Meer 'Anees', who is considered to be a virtuoso of the marsiya genre.

== Life and family ==
Meer Khaleeq's forebears had come to Delhi from Herat (Present day Afghanistan) during Shah Jahan's reign. They lived in Delhi for four generations, however when the Mughal rule started declining, they migrated to Faizabad in the princely state of Awadh.

Khaleeq was born in Faizabad, in 1766 and was educated in Faizabad and Lucknow. Khaleeq started composing poetry at the age of sixteen. Initially, his work was corrected by his father, but when Mus'hafi came to Lucknow, Khaleeq was put under his pupilage as Meer Hasan was busy writing 'Badr e Munir'. It is also claimed that initially Meer Hasan wanted Khaleeq to become Meer Taqi Meer's pupil, but Meer declined saying that he can't even pay attention to his own children's upbringing, then how could he tutor someone else?.

Khaleeq's family's language was considered to be a repository of the idioms of Urdu, so much so that Imam Baksh 'Nasikh' would tell his pupils to go to Khaleeq to learn in its pure form from him. Once Mirza Taqi 'Taraqqi' at whose place Khaleeq used to work arranged for a Mushaira. Khwaja Haidar Ali 'Aatish' was invited from Lucknow for the Mushaira. Khaleeq recited his ghazal with the opening verse:

Rashk e Aaeena Hai Us Rashk e Qamar Ka Pehlu

Saaf Idhar Se Nazar Aata Hai Udhar Ka Pehlu

The envy of the mirror is the side of that one who is the envy of the moon

The aspect of this side can be clearly seen from that side

Upon listening to this, Aatish tore his own ghazal saying that when such a person was present, what need was there for himself.

== Rivalry with Meer Zameer ==
Although there were a few other great elegy composers in Khaleeq's time, the rivalry between Khaleeq and Meer Zameer was the most noteworthy.

It was in their era that the marsiya went through quite significant changes. Earlier, each stanza in the marsiya consisted of 4 lines. Mirza Muhammad Rafi 'Sauda' started writing marsiya in the six liner musaddas form, and it was Khaleeq who made this form popular. Zameer, extended the length of the marsiya from 30 to 40 stanzas long to 70 to 100 stanzas.

Both poets had their set of supports who would fight among themselves, however Khaleeq and Zameer out of politeness never appeared together in the same gathering.

It has been narrated that once Nawab Sharaf ud Daulah arranged a majlis at his place and invited everyone. He invited both Khaleeq and Zameer to recite marsiyas, however neither one knew that the other had been invited. On the day of the majlis Zameer recited his marsiya first. Upon seeing Khaleeq, he extended the marsiya, leaving all in the audience with tears in their eyes and praise on their lips. Once he got down from the pulpit, Khaleeq was asked to recite. By the time Khaleeq had recited close to twenty stanzas, the listeners were so lost in the recitation that they were not even aware of each other's presence. Khaleeq got down from the pulpit after reciting twenty-five to thirty stanzas. After he had descended from the pulpit, the listeners looked up only to notice that the pulpit was empty. At the end of the majlis, the supporters of each poet went home proud.

== Death and legacy ==
Towards the end of his life due to old age, Khaleeq stopped reciting marsiyas. He died on 26 May 1844, at the age of 78. According to his great grandson 'Urooj', he was buried near the river Gomti. The tradition of writing marsiyas continued in his family for five generations after him, for a total of eight generations. The art of writing marsiyas remained in the family for the better part of two and a half centuries.

After Khaleeq, his son Meer Anees continued the tradition of writing marsiyas. Anees took the art of marsiya writing to its zenith, and along with Mirza Salamat Ali 'Dabeer' he is considered to be the best poet of the marsiya genre, earning the title 'Shaa'ir e Azam'
