= Ludmila Vassilyeva =

Russian scholar (born 1942)

Ludmila Vassilyeva (born May 23, 1942) is a Russian scholar who is an expert on Urdu poetry and literature. She teaches at the Institute of Oriental Studies of the Russian Academy of Sciences in Moscow.

== Early life and education ==
Vassilyeva graduated from Moscow State University (1965) and received a Ph.D. in 1987. Her doctoral thesis was on Altaf Hussain Hali.

== Career ==
From 1967 to 1984, Vassilyeva was Faiz Ahmed Faiz's interpreter as he travelled throughout the Soviet Union. Her book Faiz Ahmed Faiz: Hayat aur Takhliqaat, published in 2006, was the first literary biography of Faiz.

Vassilyeva has written extensively on Faiz and Muhammad Iqbal in both Urdu and Russian. She has translated many other Urdu poets including Ghalib and Majurh. She teaches Urdu literature at Moscow University and Russian State University for the Humanities.

== Awards and honors ==
For her outstanding contribution to Urdu studies she was conferred Sitara-i-Imtiaz award from President of Pakistan.

== Works ==
- Parvarish-e-Lauh-o-Qalam; Translated from Russian by Osama Farooqui and Ludmilla Vassilyeva. Karachi: Oxford University Press, 2004.
- The formation of Urdu ghazal: The origins of the genre; Translated from Russian by Aamer Sohail.
