= Encyclopedia of Sikhism =

Encyclopedia of Sikhism may refer to:

- Mahan Kosh, authored by Kahan Singh of Nabha
- The Encyclopaedia of Sikhism, published by Punjabi University, Patiala
