= Mohammad Ismail Khan =

Mohammad Ismail Khan may refer to

- Mohammad Ismail Khan (Indian politician), a 19th-century Indian politician
- Mohammad Ismail Khan (Afghan politician), an Afghan government minister
