= Fidvi Lahori =

Urdu poet (1729–1780)

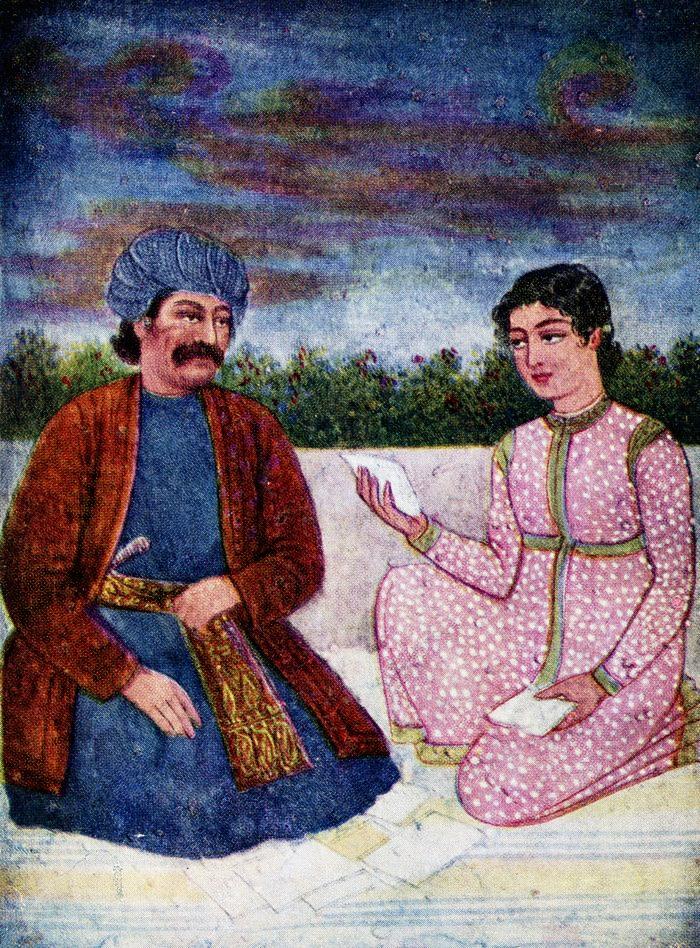
- Fidvi Lahori (left) with an attendant, anonymous painter, probably Lucknow (late 18th-century).
- Born: Mukund Lal; 1729; Lahore, Subah of Lahore, Mughal Empire
- Died: 1780 (aged 50–51); Lahore, Punjab or Moradabad, Oudh
- Writing career
- Pen name: Fidvi
- Language: Urdu

Fidvi Lahori, born Mukund Lal (Urdu: مکند لال فدوی لاہوری; 1729–1780) was an 18th-century Urdu poet from Lahore, Punjab. Fidvi was his takhallus.

== Biography ==
Born in a Hindu Bania family and originally named Mukund Lal, Fidvi converted to Islam and adopted Mirza Fidai Beg as his new name. He spent several years at Isfahan, Iran and later migrated to Delhi where he became a pupil of Sabir Ali Sabir. Fidvi had written a qasida for Ahmad Shah and was rewarded with a horse, a sword and a thousand rupees by the emperor. He found employment under Nawab Muhammad Yar Khan but soon left his court and later took service of Nawab Zabita Khan. Fidvi's poetic rivalry with Mirza Sauda was well-known. Sauda wrote a number of satirical works (ہجو) characterising Fidvi, including one in Punjabi, which are a part of his kuliyat. Fidvi later returned to Lahore where he died in 1780; according to Mashafi he died in Moradabad.

== Poetry ==
Little of Fidvi's Diwan has survived. One of his oft-quoted couplets has become a proverb:

chal saath ki hasrat dil-e-marhūm se nikle
āshiq kā janāza hai zarā dhuum se nikle

English translation:

Walk with [the bier] so that the longing may not linger in the hollowed heart.
This is the funeral procession of your lover. Let it proceed with some song and dance.
