= Mustafa Castle =

Building in Meerut, Uttar pradesh, India (1900)

- 'Nawab Kothee'
- Location within India

General information
- Location: Meerut, India, India
- Coordinates: 28.99673°N 77.69593°E
- Construction started: 1886/1887
- Completed: 1900
- Cost: Undisclosed
- Client: Nawab Mohammad Ishak Khan
- Owner: Descendants of the original owner

Design and construction
- Architect: Nawab Mohammad Ishak Khan

References
- Nawab Mohammad Ismail Khan

Mustafa Castle is a building of profound historical relevance located in Meerut, India. It was commemoratively built by Nawab Mohammad Ishak Khan [1860-1918] to serve as a memorial to Nawab Mustafa Khan Shefta, his father, [1804-1869] who was one of the most eminent and accomplished poets and critics of his era.

== Establishment ==
The construction commenced in 1896/1897 and the building was completed in 1900. The first structure, the grandiose gate, was completed in 1899; following which was the Castle itself. The Castle was completed by 1900 after a span of 4–5 years of construction. The structure was built by Nawab Mohammad Ishak Khan in honour of his father, the Persian and Urdu poet Nawab Mustafa Khan Shefta. Nawab M. Ishak Khan designed the building himself, and the imposing project, upon 30 acres of land. It was designed with the help of assistants who possessed considerable experience in building barracks for the British Army. The Nawab amalgamated many styles of architecture in building Mustafa Castle. It offers facilities akin to British bungalows and shares prominent features with the buildings of the realm of Rajasthan and Oudh—mainly Lucknow. However, the amalgam meant that the edifice of Mustafa Castle was to be peerless amongst others seen in the cities of Delhi, Hyderabad, and Lahore. A hoard of antiques within can be attributed to Nawab M. Ishak Khan's epic tours around the world and his penchant for collecting artifacts. Historical accounts make mention of clay from Mecca being used in the construction procedure and the replacement of an inward gallows with an Islamic mosque.

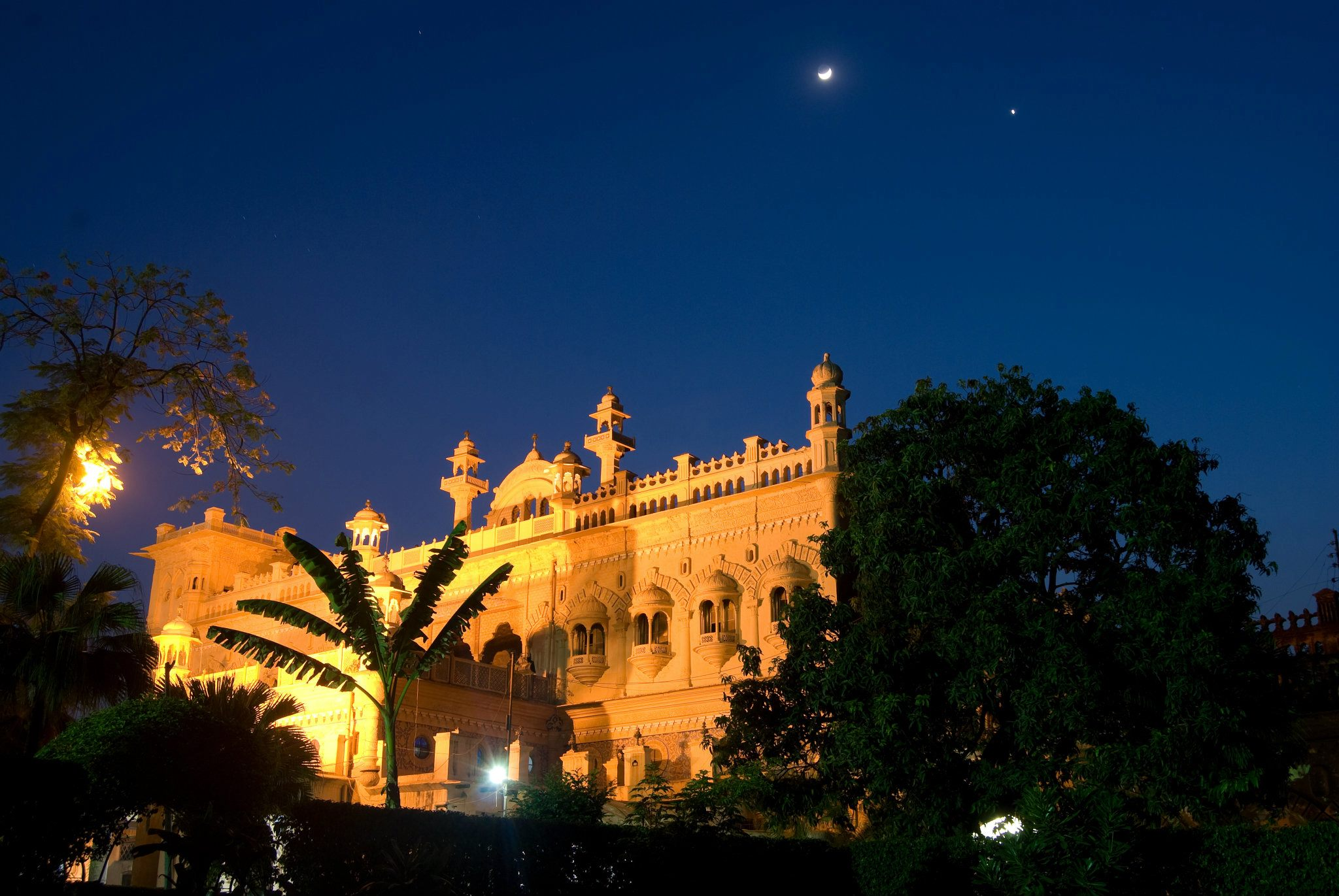
Mustafa Castle as at 2012.

== Muse ==
Nawab Mustafa Khan Shefta was a close friend, admirer and, in times of need, a patron of Mirza Ghalib – who was a classical Urdu and Persian poet from India during British colonial rule. A man of letters, he found himself in trouble after the British succeeded in regaining control of Delhi in 1857. Nawab Mustafa Khan's mother was the daughter of the Commander in Chief of the Mughal army, Ismail Baig Hamadani. Even after the surrender of the Mughal army, Ismail Baig continued his fight for liberation against the British and, as a result, retreated to Nepal. Nawab Mustafa Khan was tried for allegedly supporting the uprising which had emanated from Meerut. He was sentenced to seven years of imprisonment and confined in a cell which had been improvised – and later abandoned – for the convicts of the 1857 uprising. This small jail happened to be the centre of the area which is now enclosed by Mustafa Castle. Nawab Mustafa Khan Shefta died in 1869 when Nawab M. Ishak Khan was 9 years of age. The spot of the poet's imprisonment was purchased by Nawab M. Ishak Khan along with the adjoining area, which comprised nearly 30 acres of land. He then had Mustafa Castle built as his homage to the memory and honour of his father. The cell, in which the poet was imprisoned, has been retained in its original form so as to keep the memory of the hardship faced by Nawab Mustafa Khan Shefta during his imprisonment. That particular chamber, therefore, had been left unaltered by Nawab M. Ishak Khan. The family, that had been previously based in Delhi and Jehangirabad, had established Mustafa Castle as its main home after the building's completion in the year 1900. A similar building to Mustafa Castle, originally belonging to the same family, exists in the erstwhile family capital of Jehangirabad.

== Post-War Political Headquarters ==
Nawab Mohammad Ishak Khan died on 28 October 1918, leaving his eldest son, Nawab Mohammad Ismail Khan, at the helm. It was during Nawab M. Ismail Khan's career in the national struggle [1918–1958] that Mustafa Castle was markedly transformed into a hub of political activity. Mustafa Castle bore some of the greatest events in Meerut which were significant post-World War I/post-World War II political activities with regard to the prospective nations in question at the time—which were to be India and Pakistan. Nawab M. Ismail Khan was a highly accomplished politician and an independent activist of the Indian Subcontinent who presided as Chairman over the All-India Muslim League in the state of Uttar Pradesh [United Provinces]. In general, it was Nawab Mohammad Ismail Khan who transformed his home, Mustafa Castle, into a haven for political proceedings during his reign. Apart from being Chairman of the League, this 'transformation' ensued due to the numerous other roles that he upheld in politics. The stratum of obligations involved rendering his services as the Chairman of the All-India Muslim Civil Defense Association, Chairman of the All-India Muslim League Committee of Action, Chairman of the Parliamentary Board, President of the All-India Khilafat Committee, President of the All-Parties Muslim Conference, President of the Unity Board, and other political and academic affiliations. Albeit Nawab M. Ismail Khan is one of the founding fathers of Pakistan, he never migrated towards the 'promising land' due to his steadfast commitment towards the thousands of Muslims left behind in India itself. He, in all consciousness, decided to share the same fate despite being persistently enticed by Muhammad Ali Jinnah and Nawabzada Liaquat Ali Khan. Some of the politicians who have visited and/or stayed in Mustafa Castle are as follows:

- Mahatma Gandhi [three days during the Khilafat Movement]
- Jawaher Lal Nehru [three days during the Khilafat Movement]
- Mohammad Ali Jinnah [twice during the Pakistan Movement]
- Sarojini Naidu
- Maulana Abdul Kalam Azad
- Maulana Mohammad Ali
- Maulana Hasrat Mohani
- Vijaya Lakshmi Pundit
- Bahadur Yar Jang of Hyderabad
- Vithalbhai Patel
- Bhulabhai Desai
- Govind Vallabh Pant
- Nawabzada Liaquat Ali Khan
- Nawab Muhammad Ahmed Khan Kasuri

== The Inner Portion of the Castle ==
Several chambers within the Castle are named after colours such as 'Basanti', 'Gulabi' and so forth. They are used distinctly in summer or winter months with the relevant color schemes. Some of the originality that remains in the Castle includes furniture that had been imported by Nawab Mohammad Ishak Khan from London, to various showpieces that the Castle displays with pride. Pendulum clocks, ornately designed lamps, antique chandeliers, carved wooden cabinets, chests, dressing tables, cupboards and drawers, antique lampshades, candle-stands, mirrors and historic portraits are amongst some of the rare artifacts that have been preserved throughout Mustafa Castle's century-old lifetime.

== Gallery ==
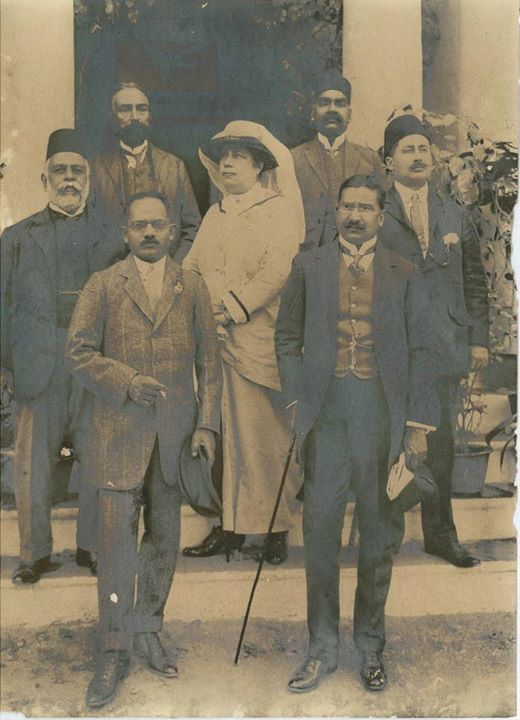
Nawab M. Ishak Khan [bearded gentleman on the left] alongside other notables of the time

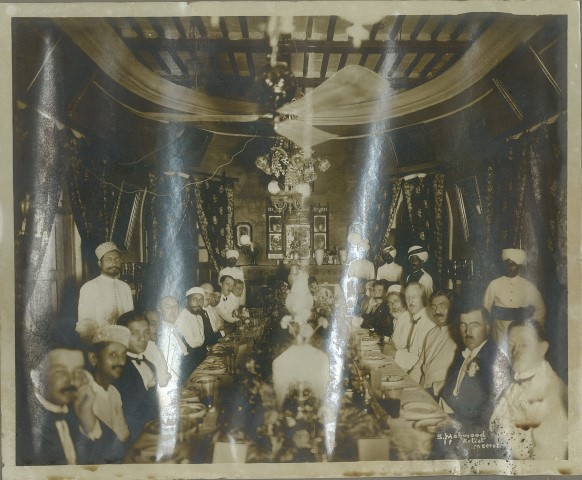
Dinner being hosted in the encircling room, [circa] 1911

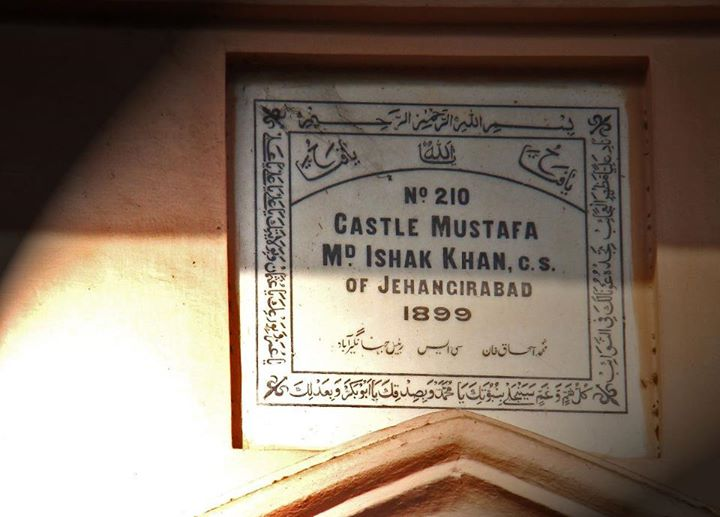
A photograph of the marble plaque, atop the gate

== See also ==
- Nawab Mohammad Ismail Khan
- All-India Muslim League
