= Harbans Singh =

Sikh educationist and scholar (1921–1998)

Harbans Singh

Harbans Singh (6 March 1921 – 30 May 1998) was an educationist, administrator, scholar and the editor-in-chief of the Encyclopaedia of Sikhism. He was respected for his contributions to Sikh scholarship and Punjabi literary studies and had a vital and pervasive influence in the field of religious studies, with special reference to Sikhism.

== Early life and family background ==
Harbans Singh was born on 6 March 1921 in the village of Kotha Guru in the Bathinda district of the Punjab. His mother, Roop Kaur, belonged to the Sodhi family and traced her ancestry to the Hari Singh Nalwa clan. She deeply influenced his religious sensibilities. He received his schooling at Khalsa Secondary School at Muktsar. Thereafter, much to the disappointment of his parents, he refused to attend Medical School, and joined the Khalsa College in Amritsar, where he became president of the Khalsa College Students Association, Editor of the Darbar, and president of the Khalsa College Hockey Club. He received both his undergraduate and graduate degrees from this premier Sikh institute. The college authorities were so familiar with his academic potential that they offered him his first academic position even before his exam results were out. Harbans Singh started his career as a lecturer of English at the Khalsa College in Amritsar in 1943. His daughter, Nikky-Guninder Kaur Singh, is Crawford Professor of Religious Studies at Colby College in Maine, USA.

== Early career ==
In 1944 he joined the Brijindra College at Faridkot as head of the department of English. Soon thereafter the Maharaja of Faridkot took him on lien from the Punjab State Education department. He wrote his first book on the history of the State of Faridkot depicting its rulers’ sponsorship and enshrinement of Sikh traditions. During that initial phase he also wrote a history of the Sikh rule under Maharaja Ranjit Singh – the first major book on the Maharaja and his times by a scholar other than the European travelers and political observers. In 1958 he rejoined his position with the Punjab State Education Department and became Principal of Government College, Muktsar. During his tenure he wrote his book on Aspects of Punjabi Literature.

== Creation of the Punjabi University ==
In 1960 he became the Member-Secretary of the Punjabi University Commission with Maharaja Yadvindra Singh of Patiala as the president. The commission was instrumental for creating the Punjabi University to advance Punjabi language, literature, and culture. The Hebrew University in Israel is the only other University founded on language. Though extremely busy with the administrative demands of the growing University, he kept up with his scholarship, writing important books, including Guru Gobind Singh (which was translated into 14 Indian languages) and The Heritage of the Sikhs (one of the most popular of his titles, which went to several editions with significant additions and revisions). In 1964 he was invited by the United States Government to study the administrative functioning and educational system of universities in the US. He compiled his impressions of this visit in the form of a book Higher Education in America (1966), which has been appreciated for its informative and educative value and its insights on continuing education – this last became the cornerstone of the Evening Studies program at the Punjabi University.

== Pioneer for the academic study of religion ==
Harbans Singh spent the 1968–69 academic year at the Center for World Religions at Harvard. It was here that he prepared a biography of Guru Nanak entitled Guru Nanak and Origins of the Sikh Faith (1969) to mark the five hundredth anniversary of the birth of the Guru. Upon his return to the Punjabi University, he played a vital role in the establishment of a full-fledged department of the academic study of religion. He became the founder chair of the first department of religious studies in India that offered courses at undergraduate and postgraduate levels. It reflected the best modalities of this kind of study in American and European universities. Called the Guru Gobind Singh Department of Religious Studies, it was established by the Punjabi University to commemorate the quincentenary of the Guru's birth.

For the celebrations Harbans Singh arranged an international seminar on Guru Nanak (September 1969). He then published the proceedings of the seminar in a volume entitled Perspectives on Guru Nanak (1975). In collaboration with Dr. L.M. Joshi he published An Introduction to Indian Religions (1973) to serve as a textbook for the first-year undergraduate students. In 1969 he also launched a biannual Journal of Religious Studies and became its founder-Editor.

During his tenure as Professor of Sikh Studies and Head of the Department of Religious Studies, he hosted many international conferences and brought distinguished scholars to the Punjabi University. He also travelled extensively, lecturing on different facets of Sikhism in Japan, Belgium, the Netherlands, England, Ireland, and the US. The series of lectures that he delivered at Berkeley at the invitation of its university in May 1984 were published in a book, The Berkeley Lectures on Sikhism. He was an active member of the World Conference on Religion and Peace, and he also joined the International Consultation in Search of Non-Violent Alternatives in Derry, Northern Ireland. All through he kept up with his scholarship in Sikh history and literature by writing books, contributing articles to journals and newspapers, translating Punjabi authors like Bhai Vir Singh, Amrita Pritam, and Ajeet Cour into English, and editing collections of short-stories, essays, and conference papers. His book on Bhai Vir Singh, which first appeared in "Makers of Indian Literature" series sponsored by the Sahitya Akademy, was republished posthumously in Punjabi by the Bhai Vir Singh Sadan in New Delhi. Harbans Singh wrote an autobiographical essay in Punjabi after losing his beloved wife Kailash Kaur.

== Later life ==
The culmination of his life was the momentous Encyclopaedia of Sikhism, the first in the English language. This comprehensive work covers different aspects of Sikh history, literature, and philosophy. The four-volume set was released by the Prime Minister of India on 5 March 1999 at New Delhi in a special function. Though Harbans Singh suffered a paralytic stroke, he received an honorary degree of Doctor of Letters from Guru Nanak Dev University, and continued working on his project until his death on 30 May 1998. He was also honored by the Shiromani Gurdwara Committee on 17 August 1992, at a function at his residence in Punjabi University where the SGPC president, Jathedar Gurcharan Singh Tohra, bestowed a siropa on him in the presence of Mr Parkash Singh Badal. During the Khalsa Tercentenary Celebrations in 1999, he was posthumously invested with the "Order of the Khalsa." The Punjabi University honored him by prefixing his name "Professor Harbans Singh" to the Department of the Encyclopedia of Sikhism to which he had totally dedicated himself during the last decades of his life. This full-fledged Department will continue to ensure that the Encyclopaedia of Sikhism is made available in Punjabi and is constantly revised and updated. An online version is published on the internet by Punjabi University. Essays in Honour of Professor Harbans Singh were published by Dr. Dharam Singh entitled Sikhism and Secularism.

== Publications ==
- Maharaja Ranjit Singh
- Aspects of Punjabi Literature
- Heritage of the Sikhs
- Higher Education in America
- Guru Gobind Singh (translated into 14 Indian languages)
- Guru Nanak and Origins of the Sikh Faith
- Perspectives on Guru Nanak
- Punjab Past and Present: Essays in Honour of Dr. Ganda Singh (with N.G. Barrier)
- Approaches to the Study of Religion
- Bhai Vir Singh (Makers of Indian Literature Series) (also translated into Punjabi)
- An Introduction to Indian Religions (with Dr. L.M. Joshi)
- Guru Tegh Bahadur
- Mahindi and Other Short Stories
- Sada Virsa
- Four Volume Encyclopedia of Sikhism
