= Zindeeq =

2021 novel by Rahman Abbas

- Author: Rahman Abbas
- Language: Urdu
- Publisher: Arshia Publication
- Publication date: November 2021
- Publication place: New Delhi, India
- ISBN: 978-9-390-68246-1

Zindeeq is the fifth novel by Urdu novelist Rahman Abbas, the winner of the Sahitya Akademi Award (India's National Academy of Letters) for his fourth novel, Rohzin in 2018. Zindeeq was published in November 2021 by Arshia Publication, New Delhi (ISBN 978 9390682461). Rahman has received an international grant to study Nazism in Germany and find out how the politics in Pakistan and India will affect its minorities. The novel research grant was awarded by 'Crossing Borders' programme, jointly held by the Robert Bosch Foundation and the Literarisches Colloquium, Berlin as reported by LCB & TOI.

== Awards ==
Maharashtra State Urdu Sahitya Academy Award for Best Novel

== Plot ==
It is a dystopian novel about the future of the subcontinent, challenges faced by minorities and about various aspects of the queer movement and alternative sexual freedom. Although it is a novel about wars in future, it also analyses the past of mankind through the use of mythological tales. German scholar Almuth Degener writes that Zindeeq's plot is gripping. The novel spells out a dire warning: do not allow narrow-minded identity politics to suffocate a liberal and pluralistic social order. Moreover, the book also tackles many things that are not of immediate political relevance, though they do have socio-political implications, such as sex, philosophy, drugs, a dose of Sufism and, not least, poetry.

The novel ends in 2075 with the beginning of a devastating war in the subcontinent. But in a way, it is an anti-war novel. Peace cannot be retained if we fail to understand the terrors of the wars waged in the name of racial supremacy or for geo-political gain. The protagonist of the novel, Sanaullah, is rooted in Indian civilization and states that there are lessons in Mahabharat but realises that man is an animal who does not learn. And if a man cannot learn from Mahabharat or the Holocaust, he cannot learn anything, but can only suffer and die. The second theme of the book is the LGBTQ movement and freedom of choice. The third theme is what are the predictions of the Semitic religions about the last great wars in the world, and how can these affect geo-political equations?

== Reception ==
Critic Dr Shahid Iqbal Kamran analyzed the novel and writes in his article that "Zindeeq begins with the most important day of Sanaullah’s life, when he passed the compulsory examination to become an officer in the army and ends with the phrase, "And the war has begun'. It points to a fear that if both the countries will remain victims of their history, unless people here come out of the ideas and thoughts spread during the British rule, and the light of Taxila is not spread the region will continue to plunge in the darkness. As long as solidarity, freedom and equality are not embraced as a common principle, the fear of war will continue to haunt and destroy minds. And that is what this novel marks on the minds of readers."
