= Altaf Fatima =

Pakistani writer (1927-2018)

- الطاف فاطمہ
- Born: 10 June 1927; Lucknow, United Provinces, British India
- Died: November 29, 2018 (aged 91); Lahore, Punjab, Pakistan
- Occupations: Academic, Novelist

Altaf Fatima (Urdu: الطاف فاطمہ; 10 June 1927 – 29 November 2018) was a Pakistani Urdu novelist, short story writer, and teacher (specializing in the life and works of Muhammad Iqbal).

== Early life ==
Altaf Fatima was born in Lucknow, she moved to Lahore during the Partition of India in 1947, and earned her MA and BEd degrees from the University of Punjab. Her novel Dastak Na Dou (Don't Knock) is regarded as one of the defining works in the Urdu language. An adaptation was presented on Pakistan Television and an abridged translation was serialised by the Karachi monthly, The Herald. Altaf Fatima belonged to the extended family of Maulana Fazl-e-Haq Khairabadi on her paternal side. Fatima's 'Maamoon' (maternal uncle) Syed Rafiq Hussain was a well-known short story writer. In her childhood, due to her maternal grandfather's intellectual contacts, she was exposed to the company of literary personalities like Ali Abbas Hosseini and Syed Masud Hassan Rizvi (father of Naiyer Masud).

== Awards and recognition ==
Altaf Fatima also declined several official honours during her lifetime. According to a 2018 profile in The News International, she was nominated for the Pride of Performance award during the Zia-ul-Haq era but did not give her consent to receive it. She also declined the National Award for Literature, which she was offered around 2016. She refused civil awards several times. The same profile reported that she valued her independence as a writer and had also refused government financial assistance.

In 2018, Altaf Fatima received the Karachi Literature Festival Urdu Literature award at the 9th Karachi Literature Festival for her book, Deed Wadeed.

== Death ==
Altaf Fatima died on 29 November 2018 in Lahore, Pakistan at age 91.

== Career ==
Dastak Na Dou, her second novel, was published in 1965 becoming her most celebrated work. Set against the Partition of India, the novel explores themes of identity, culture, and migration through the perspectives of Geeti, the protagonist, and Liu, a Chinese immigrant. A television adaptation of the novel was broadcast by Pakistan Television Corporation in 1986, starring Roohi Bano. The novel was translated into English by Rukhsana Ahmad as The One Who Did Not Ask, and published in 1993.

Following Dastak Na Dou, she wrote Chalta Musafir, set against the backdrop of the 1971 Bangladesh independence movement. Some contemporary reviewers noted that the novel presented a particular perspective on the events of 1971, without covering all aspects of the conflict.

== Works ==
=== Novels ===
- Nishaan-i-Manzil (1975)
- Dastak Naa Dou (1964) (Don't Knock (Novel) English translation published by Heinemann in 1994)
- Chalta Musafir (1981)
- Khwabgar (2008)

=== Collection of short stories ===
- Woh Jissay Chaha Gaya(1969)
- Jab Deewarein Girya Karti Hain (1988)
- Taar-i-Ankaboot (1990)
- Deed Wadeed (2017)
- Gawahi Akhir e Shab Ki (2018)

=== Translations ===
- Naghmay ka Qatal (Urdu Translation of Harper Lee's novel To Kill a Mockingbird)
- Mere Bachay Meri Daulat (Urdu Translation of My Children, My Gold by Debbie Taylor)
- Barrey Aadmi, Aur Unke Nazariyat. A collection of political essays
- Moti. Urdu Translation of The Pearl by John Steinbeck
- Sach Kahaniyan (2000) (Urdu translation of Truth Tales i.e. Gujrati, Marathi, Tamil and Hindi Short Stories)
- Zaitoon ke Jhund (2016) (Urdu translation of Santa Claus in Baghdad by Elsa Marston)
- Japani Afsana Nigar Khawateen (1994) (Urdu translation of collection of Japanese short stories )
- Haveli ke Ander (Urdu translation of Inside the Haveli by Rama Mehta)
- Parai Aag (Urdu translation of collection of South American short stories) (2026)

=== Tanqeed ===
- Urdu Adab Mein Fann e Sawaneh Nigari ka Irtiqa (1961)

=== General ===
- Rozmarra Aadaab (1963)

== See also ==
- List of Pakistani writers

== Sources ==
- Yassin-Kassab, Robin; Sardar, Ziauddin (2012). Pakistan?. Oxford University Press. p. 126. ISBN 9781849042239.
