= Rahman Abbas =

Indian author

- Born: 30 January 1972 (age 54)
- Education: University of Mumbai
- Writing career
- Notable works: Ek Mamnua Muhabbat Ki Kahani; Khuda Ke Saaye Mein Ankh Micholi; Rohzin; Zindeeq; EK Tarha Ka Pagalpan
- Notable awards: Sahitya Akademi Award

Rahman Abbas (born 30 January 1972) is an Indian fiction writer and the recipient of the India's highest literary Award Sahitya Akademi Award for his fourth novel Rohzin in 2018. He is also the recipient of the two Maharashtra State Academy Awards for his third and fourth novels respectively i.e. Hide and Seek in the Shadow of God (2011) and the Rohzin in 2017. His work has received a LitProm Grant funded by the German Federal Foreign Office and the Swiss-South Cultural Fund. He writes in Urdu and in English. His novels deal with themes of forbidden politics and love.

The largest online reading portal Rekhta has stated that Rahman Abbas is one of the most read Urdu novelists. Penguin Random House has published Rohzin in English in May 2022. Rohzin has been longlisted for JCB Prize 2022.

== Life and career ==
Abbas has master's degrees in Urdu and English literature from University of Mumbai.

Rahman Abbas is author of ten books including six novels: Nakhalistan Ki Talash (The Search of an Oasis-2004), Ek Mamnua Muhabbat Ki Kahani (A Forbidden Love Story-2009), Khuda Ke Saaye Mein Ankh Micholi (Hide and Seek in the Shadow of God-2011), Rohzin (The Melancholy of the Soul-2016). and Zindeeq (Heretic). and Ek Tarha Ka Pagalpan (A Sort of Madness)

Rahman's first novel is Nakhalistan Ki Talash (Search of an Oasis) published in 2004. The fundamentalists had alleged that the novel is an obscene book. He was arrested and had to spend a few days at Arthur Road Jail. However, he was subsequently acquitted by the court in 2016. In an interview, he stated about this painful experience- "After a decade, the trial ended, but for all those years, I had to go to the court and stand in front of the judge, like Josef K. in Franz Kafka's The Trial, not knowing what his crime was. Nakhlistan Ki Talash had created a storm in the conservative Urdu literary circles, and Rahman resigned from his post as lecturer in a junior college in Mumbai. The novel tells the story of a young educated Muslim man whose increasing alienation in a post-1992 Mumbai leads him to a Kashmiri militant organization. He finds his cultural identity blurred during the rise of the right-wing and hate-filled politics in India at the turn of the century. He tries to demonstrate his identity and historic self, ultimately leading to his tragic and mysterious end.

He won the state Sahitya Akademi Award in 2011 for his third didactic novel Khuda Ke Saaye Mein Ankh Micholi. He returned the award in 2015 when major Indian writers and artists had protested against the 'wave of intolerance in Indian society' triggered by the right-wing politics'.

== Critical reputation ==
Pakistani author Mustansar Hussain Tarar stated that Rahman's latest novel Rohzin is a fearless creative narration. Professor Gopichand Narang, former president of Sahitya Academy, called Rohzin a turning point in the history of Urdu novels.

== Awards and honours ==
- 2011 Maharashtra State Urdu Sahitya Akademy Award for Khuda Ke Saaye Mein Ankh Micholi
- 2017 Maharashtra State Urdu Sahitya Akademy Award for Rohzin
- 2018 Main Sahitya Akademi Award for Rohzin
- 2022 Rohzin (English) longlisted for JCB Prize, which is the richest literary prize in India.
- 2024 Rohzin (English) Shortlisted for the Muse India 2023 GSP Rao Translation Award
- 2026 A Sort of Madness (Urdu : EK Tarha Ka Pagalpan) shortlisted for the UK's John Dryden Translation Competition. []

== Works ==
- Nakhalistan Ki Talash [The Search of an Oasis], (Novel-2004)
- Ek Mamnua Muhabbat Ki Kahani, [A Forbidden Love Story], (Novel-2009)
- Khuda Ke Saaye Mein Ankh Micholi [Hide and Seek in the Shadow of God] (Novel-2011)
- Rohzin [The Melancholy of the Soul], (novel-2016)
- Zindeeq [Atheist or Apostate], First published by Arshia Publications, New Delhi in November 2021, Pakistani Edition was published by Aks Publications in January 2022. Zindeeq is a dystopian novel that seriously deals with the rise of religious extremism in subcontinent India and Pakistan.
- Ek Tarha Ka Pagalpan [A Sort of Madness],
- On the Other Side (Urdu title- Khuda Ke Saaye Mein Ankh Micholi) published in English by Penguin Random House, India.
- Nixdaan [The Nutritious Food] (Novel 2024)ِ
- Kamakhya (Novel 2026), In this novel, Abbas attempts to reimagine one of Urdu literature’s most iconic characters, Umrao Jaan. In Mirza Hadi Ruswa’s Umrao Jaan Ada (1899), and explore the ugly face of flesh trade and porn industry. Abbas's Kamakhya is the antithesis of Umrao Jaan Ada, as he depicts the circumstances that led to her selling her body, and how she eventually takes control over who gets access to her. The novel is written from a woman’s perspective, set in 1980s Mumbai, and the whole text is built on Mumbai slang/Bambayya Boli.

A trilogy of his early writing, entitled Teen Novels (ISBN 978-93-81029-29-9), was published in 2013 by Arshia Publication.
