= Nazeer Akbarabadi =

Indian poet (1735–1830)

- Born: Wali Muhammad; 1735; Agra
- Died: 1830 (aged 94–95); Dehli
- Occupation: poet
- Writing career
- Language: Urdu
- Notable work: Banjaranama (Chronicle of the Nomad)

Nazeer Akbarabadi (born Wali Muhammad; 1735 – 1830) was an 18th-century Indian poet known as the "Father of Nazm", who wrote Urdu ghazals and nazms under the pen name (takhallus) "Nazeer", most remembered for his poems like Banjaranama (Chronicle of the Nomad), a satire.

== Early life ==
His father was Muhammad Farooq and his mother was the daughter of Nawab Sultan Khan who was the governor of Agra Fort. Agra, the Indian city, was known as Akbarabad after Mughal emperor Akbar at that time.

Nazeer's date of birth is not certain but most of his biographers believe that he was born in Delhi (then called "Dihli") in 1735 AD. The period of his birth coincided with the decline of the Mughal Empire in India. Nazeer was still a child in 1739 when Nadir Shah attacked Delhi and the Mughal emperor Muhammad Shah (also known as "Muhammad Shah Rangila") was arrested. Though Muhammad Shah was later released, countless people were killed in Delhi. Eighteen years later, in 1757 AD, Ahmad Shah Abdali attacked Delhi, and people left Delhi for safer cities. Nazeer, along with his mother and grandmother, abandoned Delhi and migrated to Akbarabad.

== Poetry ==
It is said that Nazeer's poetic works consisted of about 200,000 verses, but the majority have been destroyed and only 6,000 verses are available in printed form. No other Urdu poet before him had used as many words as Nazeer did. Nazeer's poetry conveyed the plight of the common people in their own everyday language and was very popular among the masses. Perhaps due to this lack of the "elite" element, Nazir's genius was not recognized until much later.

Nazeer's popularity is primarily due to his nazms, which reflected various aspects of the daily life of his age, such as all types of religious and social events among common people. He wrote nazms about religious and social festivals, such as Diwali, Holi, Eid, Shab-e-baraat, about fruits and about animals like mouse and birds, about seasons and even inanimate objects. His nazms also explored about different aspects of human life, such as "muflisi" (Urdu word meaning "poverty") and "kohrinamah" (chronicle of a leper).

Nazeer Akbarabadi's contemporaries were Mirza Muhammad Rafi Sauda, Mir Taqi Mir, Sheikh Qalandar Bakhsh Jur'at, Insha Allah Khan Insha, and Ghulam Hamdani Mushafi.

== Death and legacy ==
Nazeer Akbarabadi died in 1830 AD, at age 95.

Though the era of modern nazm credits Altaf Hussain Hali and Muhammad Husain Azad, Nazeer could arguably be considered "Father of Urdu Nazm" because he preceded them.

== Sample poem ==
بنجارا

ٹک حرص وھوا کو چھوڑ میاں، مت دیس بدیس پھرے مارا
قذًاق اجل کا لوٹے ہے دن رات بجا کر نقًارا
یہ دھوم دھڑکًا ساتھ لیے کیوں پھرتا ہے جنگل جنگل
ا ک تنکا ساتھ نہ جاے گا، موقوف ہوا جب ان اور جل
سب ٹھاٹھ پڑا رہ جاے گا جب لاد چلے گا بنجارا
مغرور نہ ہو تلواروں پر، مت پھول بھروسے ڈھالوں کے
سب پٹاً توڑ کے بھاگیں گے، منہ دیکھ اجل کے بھالوں کے
ہو ڈھیر اکیلا جنگل میں تو خاک لحد کی پھانکے گا
اس جنگل میں پھر آہ نظیر اک بھنگا آن نہ جھانکے گا
سب ٹھاٹھ پڑا رہ جاے گا جب لاد چلے گا بنجارا

— Nazeer Akbarabadi
Translation:

The Angel of death

Discard greed and temptations, forget your travels to near and far;
The bandit of death is blowing his trumpet and indulging in looting day and night;
Why are you roaming from place to place with all your paraphernalia;
Not even a twig will eventually go with you when your death arrives;
Your riches and grand life style are all left behind when the angel of death loads you on his back;
Do not feel proud of your swords and shields;
They will abandon you on seeing the spear of death;
Alone in a desert would you then eat the dust of the grave;
In that desert, indeed Nazeer, not even an insect would care to visit you;
Your riches and grand life style are all left behind when the angel of death loads you on his back.

== Qualities of his poetry ==
=== Natural poetry ===
Nazeer was the one who laid the foundation of natural poetry, which was later continued by Altaf Hussain Hali and Muhammad Husain Azad.

== In popular culture ==
In 1954, the Indian Urdu playwright Habib Tanvir wrote and directed his first significant play, Agra Bazar, based on the works and times of Nazir Akbarabadi. It used local residents and folk artist from Okhla village in Delhi and students of Jamia Millia Islamia as actors, a play not staged in a confined space, rather a bazaar, a marketplace.
