= Nikky-Guninder Kaur Singh =

Indian-born American scholar in Sikhism and professor

- Born: India
- Parent: Harbans Singh (father)

Academic background
- Education: Wellesley College; University of Pennsylvania; Temple University

Academic work
- Discipline: Religious studies
- Institutions: Colby College
- Main interests: Gender in Sikhism

Nikky-Guninder Kaur Singh, also known as Nikky Singh, is an Indian-born American scholar in Sikhism, and professor and chair of the Department of Religious Studies at Colby College in Waterville, Maine, USA.

Singh joined Colby in 1986. She translates Sikh religious works into English and examines gender in Sikhism. Her books include "The Feminine Principle in the Sikh Vision of the Transcendent (1993)", "The Name of My Beloved: Verses of the Sikh Gurus (1995)", "Sikhism: An Introduction (2011)", "The First Sikh: The Life and Legacy of Guru Nanak (2019)", and "Janamsakhi: Paintings of Guru Nanak in Early Sikh Art (2023)".

A day, 26 March, in the city of Fresno, California, is named for her.

== Early life and education ==
Nikky Singh was born in India, to Harbans Singh, professor of religious studies at Punjabi University. She attended Stuart Hall School, a girls’ preparatory school in Virginia, in the United States. Subsequently, she gained a place at Wellesley College, from where she received a bachelor's degree in philosophy and religion in 1978. There, her thesis was on "Physics and Metaphysics of Sikh scripture". She received her master's degree from the University of Pennsylvania in 1982, and her PhD from Temple University in 1987.

== Career ==
Singh joined Colby College in Waterville, Maine, in 1986. She translates Sikh religious works into English, examines gender in Sikhism, and focuses on poetics. British scholar of Sikhism, Eleanor Nesbitt, notes that while modern day scholars tend to avoid using the terms "his", "he", and him", Singh's English translations of the Guru Granth Sahib also uses gender neutral terms such as “Sovereign” as an alternative to the more traditional “God” and “Lord”. Singh questions academics who have not asked about the women within the lives of the Gurus, and is one of several scholars that argue that Guru Nanak was a social reformer who spoke out against the caste system, the status of Indian women and superstition in religion.

In The Feminine Principle in the Sikh Vision of the Transcendent (1993), Singh's first book, she sees value in women in Sikhism as reflected in feminine words such as Bani. In the same work she analysed the "mother" image depicted in Sikh writings, and described bridal jewellery as being empowering to women. In 1995, she published The Name of My Beloved: Verses of the Sikh Gurus. Along with her first book, Doris R. Jakobsh describes Singh's 2005 book titled The Birth of the Khalsa: A Feminist Re-Memory of Sikh Identity , as "groundbreaking"..."flinging open wide the doors to feminist approaches". According to Singh, Guru Nanak was "the first feminist", whose understanding of equality for women was innovative for that time, and generations of Sikhs have not given women the equality that the Gurus preached.

Her Sikhism: An Introduction was published in 2011. In her essay "Revising the Divine", Singh questions male-dominated historical interpretations of Sikhism, and makes plain that the mother image is the "source of creation and wisdom", and bringing that notion to the forefront when examining holy scriptures is one forward development to counteracting what she sees as male prejudice against women in Sikh communities. Singh disagrees with the view that the name "Kaur" came about during British rule in India. She traces the name to Guru Gobind Singh, the last of the ten Gurus.

In Janamsakhi: Paintings of Guru Nanak in Early Sikh Art (2023), Singh looks at the B40 Janamsakhi, part of the small surviving collection of early Janamsakhis. In the work she highlights how early Sikh images show Guru Nanak within a range of depictions.

== Awards and honors ==
In 2022, the city of Fresno, California, honored Singh by naming 26 March as "Nikky-Guninder Kaur Singh Day." She was awarded a fellowship from the Department of Historical Studies of Punjabi University, Patiala.

== Selected publications ==
=== Articles ===
- Singh, Nikky-Guninder Kaur (1992). "The Myth of the Founder: The Janamsākhīs and Sikh Tradition". History of Religions. 31 (4): 329–343. doi:10.1086/463291. ISSN 0018-2710. JSTOR 1062798. S2CID 161226516.
- Singh, Nikky-Guninder Kaur (1992). "The Sikh Bridal Symbol: An Epiphany of Interconnections". Journal of Feminist Studies in Religion. 8 (2): 41–64. ISSN 8755-4178. JSTOR 25002180.
- Singh, Nikky-Guninder Kaur (2000). "Why Did I Not Light the Fire? The Refeminization of Ritual in Sikhism". Journal of Feminist Studies in Religion. 16 (1): 63–85. ISSN 8755-4178. JSTOR 25002376.
- Kaur Singh, Nikky-Guninder (2004). "Sacred Fabric and Sacred Stitches: The Underwear of the Khalsa". History of Religions. 43 (4): 284–302. doi:10.1086/426737. ISSN 0018-2710. JSTOR 10.1086/426737. S2CID 224807538.
- Kaur Singh, Nikky-Guninder (May 2008). "Re-Imagining the Divine in Sikhism". Feminist Theology. 16 (3): 332–349. doi:10.1177/0966735008091398. ISSN 0966-7350. S2CID 220710438.

=== Books ===
- The Feminine Principle in the Sikh Vision of the Transcendent. Cambridge University Press. 1993. ISBN 978-0-521-43287-0.
- The Name of My Beloved: Verses of the Sikh Gurus. New Delhi: Penguin Books. 1995. ISBN 978-0-06-067049-8.
- The Birth of the Khalsa: A Feminist Re-Memory of Sikh Identity. State University of New York Press. 2005. ISBN 978-0-7914-8266-7.
- Sikhism: An Introduction. Bloomsbury Publishing. 2011. ISBN 978-0-85773-549-2.
- Of Sacred and Secular Desire: An Anthology of Lyrical Writings from the Punjab. Bloomsbury Publishing. 2012. ISBN 978-0-85773-098-5.
- The First Sikh: The Life and Legacy of Guru Nanak. Penguin Random House India Private Limited. 2019. ISBN 978-93-5305-710-7.
- Janamsakhi: Paintings of Guru Nanak in Early Sikh Art. Roli Books. 2023. ISBN 978-93-92130-80-9.
