= Banjaranama =

Urdu satirical poem

Banjaranama was written by Nazeer Akbarabadi (1735-1830)

The Banjaranama (بنجارانامہ, बंजारानामा, Chronicle of the Nomad) is a satirical Urdu poem, written by the eighteenth-century Indian poet Nazeer Akbarabadi. The poem's essential message is that pride in worldly success is foolish, because human circumstances can change in a flash, material wealth and splendor is always transient, and death is the only certainty for all men. The poem quickly captured the popular imagination, and achieved fame in the Indian subcontinent that has lasted for over two centuries. Critics have observed that, despite the deliberate simplicity of its language, the poem's idioms and imagery were dazzling in their span, and portrayed lives of wealth and power as ultimately subject to a nomad's whims (an allusion to death). The poem continues to be hailed as distilling "the teachings of thousands of years into one summary form."

== Refrain and example verse ==
All verses in the poem end on the same refrain: Sab thaat para reh jayega, Jab laad chalega banjara (All your splendor will lie useless, when the nomad packs-up and leaves). By itself, the refrain is frequently used in popular culture as a reminder that death is the "great leveler" and it is short-sighted to sacrifice conscience to greed. The refrain is sometimes used in political and parliamentary speeches in India as well.

Urdu

گر تو ہے لکھی بنجارہ اور کھیپ بھی تیری بھاری ہے
اے غافل تجھ سے بھی چڑهتا اک اور بڑا بیوپاری ہے
کیا شکر مصری قند گری کیا سانبھر میٹھا کھاری ہے
کیا داکھ منقا سونٹھ مرچ کیا کیسر لونگ سپاری ہے
سب ٹھاٹھ پڑا رہ جاویگا جب لاد چلے گا بنجارہ

Devnagri transcription

गर तू है लक्खी बंजारा और खेप भी तेरी भारी है
ऐ ग़ाफ़िल तुझसे भी चढ़ता इक और बड़ा ब्योपारी है
क्या शक्कर मिसरी क़ंद गरी, क्या सांभर मीठा-खारी है
क्या दाख मुनक़्क़ा सोंठ मिरच, क्या केसर लौंग सुपारी है
सब ठाठ पड़ा रह जावेगा जब लाद चलेगा बंजारा

English translation

If you are a millionaire, and your stores are brimming,
Know, O ignorant! There is always another merchant who is even greater than you.
What of your sugar, candy, jaggery and nuts? What of your doughs, sweet and salty?
What of your grapes, raisins, ginger and pepper? What of your saffron, cloves and betel?
All your splendor will lie useless, when the nomad packs-up and leaves.

== Usage of common language ==
Contrary to the then prevalent tradition of using refined literary language in poetry, Nazeer Akbarabadi chose idioms and words from the casual language spoken in the street, both in Banjaranama and in his other works. Though the poem as a whole is largely comprehensible to native Hindustani speakers in the modern-day, some words are considered archaic today, such as dakh (داکھ, दाख, grape, from the Sanskrit द्राक्ष, draksh) which has been completely replaced by the Persian-derived term angoor in modern Hindi.

== See also ==
- Nazeer Akbarabadi
- Banjara
