= Nawab Mustafa Khan Shefta =

British Indian Urdu poet and critic (1809-1869)

Nawab Mustafa Khan Shefta (1809–1869) was an Urdu poet and critic, and a contemporary of Mirza Ghalib. Shefta and Hasrati were his pen names ( Takhallus.)

Born in Delhi, he belonged to a prominent landowning family of Bangash Hindustani Pathans. His kinsmen included the Nawabs of Farrukhabad and the rebel Walidad Khan of Barabasti. His father-in-law was the famous General Ismail Beg Hamadani. His estates included the jagir of Palwal in Gurgaon and Jehangirabad in Meerut.

Mustafa Khan's early education was received from famous teachers such as Mian ji Maal Maal, and Haji Mohammed Nur Naqshbandi. He began composing poetry when he was a teenager, and eventually became known as a prominent member of the Delhi literary circle that included Ghalib, Zauq and Momin. He was particularly close to Ghalib, and stood by him as a friend and patron, helping him out in times of need and visiting him in prison when he was in trouble with the authorities. His home was well known as a venue of musha'airas and as a centre of poetic activity and patronage.

After the 1857 Rebellion, Mutiny Shefta was arrested by the British on suspicion of involvement with the rebels, due to his close ties to Bahadur Shah Zafar and relationship with Walidad Khan and Ismail Beg. He was sentenced to seven years imprisonment and his estates were seized, only half of which were later restored on appeal. The prison in which he was held was later purchased by his son Nawab Ishaq Khan who inherited his title and estates, and the historic family home Mustafa Castle was constructed on the site, integrating the original prison room in the design.

== Death and legacy ==
Nawab Mustafa Khan Shefta died in 1869 at his residence in Kucha Chelaan, Delhi. He is buried at his family graveyard near Hazrat Nizamuddin Dargah.

His son Nawab Ishaq Khan was a leading figure in the Aligarh movement, and his grandson was Nawab Mohammad Ismail Khan, the famous Muslim League politician and signatory to the first Indian Constitution.

== Writings ==
Shefta's poetry was romantic in disposition. Two courtesans appear frequently as the objects of his desire in his writings. One of these was Ramjo, a dancing girl and poet who wrote under the name "Nazakat". In his middle years Shefta performed the Haj pilgrimage, during which his ship was wrecked on an uninhabited island from which he and his fellow travellers were rescued after several weeks. This event is recorded in his short account of the journey. After the Haj, Shefta became more religious and his writing became spiritual and abstemious in tone. His writing was widely praised for its simplicity, clarity and purity of diction. Amongst his proclaimed admirers were Ghalib, Hasrat Mohani and Altaf Hussain Hali who wrote:

Hali sukhan mein Shefta se mustfeed hai, Ghalib ka molqid hai, muqlid hai Mir ka. (Hali owes his poetic skill to Shefta, is an admirer of Ghalib, an emulator of Mir)

Shefta sought advice or islah for his own Urdu poetry from Momin, and for Persian verse from Ghalib. He also authored an early history of Urdu poetry called Gulshan-e-be-khaar ("The Thornless Garden").
