= Ek Mamnua Muhabbat Ki Kahani =

2009 novel by Rahman Abbas

Ek Mamnua Muhabbat ki Kahani (An illicit Love Story or A Forbidden Love Story) is the second novel by Rahman Abbas. It was first published in 2009 and was awarded Best Novel of The Year in 2011 by the Universal Society for Peace and Research (Aurangabad). The book was an immediate success in the Urdu speaking world.

== Plot and Motif ==
The novel is a heart-touching and melancholic love story between a 15-year-old boy-Abdul Aziz and a married woman-Sakina. The story is set in a remote village of Kokan i.e., on the western coastline of India, a village not yet connected with the modern world and immersed in the magic of its own culture and dialect. The book mesmerizes readers by all seasons of the western coastal region, one can strongly smell the torrential rainfall, rice paddies, Alphonso mango orchards, rivulets in deep forests, snakes with golden skin, Garcinia indica, (Kokum trees) and its soar taste, superstitions, Jinn and birds forecasting luck along with the stories of people who have never seen other places or countries. An Illicit Love Story is considered one of the most passionate and imaginative love stories written by any Urdu writer in the last two decades in Urdu fiction. The novel begins with the wedding rituals where the protagonists Abdul Aziz and Sakina accidentally indulge in a sexual encounter that thrived into a lifelong romantic relationship. Sakina begets a son (Yusuf) out of this illicit relationship who was destined to become a religious scholar and preacher who later advocates the puritan religious ways. However, Abdul Aziz grows into a mature person having faith in the composite culture and liberal values. He challenged dogmatic thinking and fundamentalism but as a consequence of countering with the religious dictum, the disciples of Yusuf killed Aziz. The story creates doubts in the hearts of readers that Yusuf might have killed Abdul Aziz because he realized that his mother had an extra-marital affair with Aziz and that wounded Yusuf more than the free-thinking of Aziz.

== Reception ==
The novel is considered one of the most imaginative love stories written by any Urdu writer in the last two decades in Urdu fiction. The former President of the Sahitya Akademi, India's National Academy of Letters, Gopi Chand Narang has said during a seminar titled Urdu Novel on the threshold of 21st Century that in this novel the author has woven two love stories artistically, the intersexuality is rich with several layers. Eminent critic Waris Alvi has said that in this novel Rahman has smartly used humor. On the other hand, fiction writer Sajid Rashid said that undoubtedly it is a major love story, beautifully written, it also poses serious questions about the time we are living in. The book has been discussed in various literary magazines in both India and Pakistan.
