= Rohzin =

2016 novel by Rahman Abbas

- Author: Rahman Abbas
- Language: Urdu
- Published: 2016
- Publication place: India

Rohzin is the fourth novel of Rahman Abbas. On this novel he won India's highest literary Award Sahitya Akademi Award in 2018. Published in 2016 by Arshia Publications, Delhi, and launched at the Jashn-e-Rekhta, Delhi on 14 February 2016. Since, then, Rohzin has been widely debated in India, Pakistan, the Middle East, Canada, Switzerland, and Germany. The author coins the word- 'Rohzin' to signify the psychological trauma of children who witness the betrayal of their parents/sleeping with someone else. Critics in the Global South think of Rohzin as a literary landmark in Urdu literature.

== English translation ==
Penguin Random House published Rohzin in English in May 2022. and it has been longlisted for JCB Prize, which is the richest literary prize in India. The Deccan Herald writes that Rohzin is one of the most disturbing novels of recent times, the reading of which cannot but leave the reader haunted for many days. It has been shortlisted for the Muse India 2023 GSP Rao Translation Award.

== Summary ==
The two main characters are Asrar and Hina. The setting is Mumbai. The novel begins when the city is submerged, and that day is the last day in the life of Asrar and Hina. Flashbacks tell a story that deals with mythology, legend, religion, magic realism, sexuality, sensuality, love and loyalty. The book is indeed modern in the sense of questioning contemporary lifestyles without much concern for traditions of any kind.

== Reception ==
Many scholars and literary critics consider Rohzin to be the most beautiful and creative novel written in Urdu in the last few decades. Critic and former President of Sahitya Akademi (New Delhi), Professor Gopi Chand Narang, said that Rohzin is an important turning point in the history of Urdu fiction. Sahitya Akademi Award-winning literary critic, Nizam Siddiqui, has said that no novel as major as Rohzin has appeared in the second decade of the 21st century in Urdu.

In 2017, the Hindu Literary for Life festival hosted a session on Rohzin, where critic, Shafey Kidwai, discussed the novel with the author. The Seemanchal Literary Festival, TISS, and Dehradun Literature Festivals invited the author to read from the novel. In 2016, Rawal TV, Canada's Urdu television network, broadcast an hour-long debate on the novel in which critics from India and Pakistan participated.

Rohzin grabbed the attention of German linguist and Urdu translator, Almuth Degener, who translated it for Draupadi Verlag under the German title "Die Stadt, Das Meer, Die Liebe", (The city, the Sea and the Love). The translated version was launched in Switzerland in February 2018. Rahman Abbas was invited to Germany to undertake a literary tour from 23 March to 15 June 2018. The readings of Rohzin were held at South Asian Institute (Heidelberg University), Bonn University, Ev. Akademie (Villigst), Indian Consulate (Frankfurt), Café Mouseclick, Tisch Hochst, Pakban (Frankfurt), Lokalezeitung, Gonsenheim (Mainz), Pfalzer Hof Schonau (Bei, Heidelberg), Bickelmann Family (Heidelberg) and other places.

== Bibliography ==
- Rohzin First Edition 2016 ISBN 9789383322503 published by Arshia Publication New Delhi.
