= Masud Hassan Rizvi =

Masud Hassan Rizavi
- Born: 1893; Bahraich, North-Western Provinces, India
- Died: 1975 (aged 81–82)
- Education: University of Lucknow
- Occupations: Writer, scholar
- Known for: Urdu literature
- Awards: Padma Shri

Adib Masud Hassan Rizavi (1893–1975) was an Indian author and a scholar of Urdu literature. Born in 1893 in Bahraich in the North-Western Provinces of British India, he did his early college studies at the Canning College, Lucknow after which he secured a master's degree in Persian literature from Lucknow University. He started his career as a junior lecturer at the Lucknow University in 1927 and rose to become the head of the department of Urdu and Persian in 1930 from where he retired in 1954.

Rizavi published his first book, Imtihan-i-Wafa in 1918 which was a translation of an Alfred Lord Tennyson work. Hamari Shayari, Lucknow ka Shahi Stage, Lucknow ka Awami Stage, Urdu Zaban aur Uska Rasm-i-kat, Mutafarriqat-e-Ghalib, Anisyat, Wajid Ali Shah, Madras-e-Rekhta and Azeezi Lucknowi are some of his other notable publications, the last four books getting released after his death in 1975. His life and works have been documented in a book, Saiyyid Masud Hasan Rizavi adīb: hiyāt aur adabi khidmāt, written by Vasim Ārā and published in 1990. Rizavi, whose son, Naiyer Masud, is also a known short story writer, was honoured by the Government of India in 1970 with Padma Shri, the fourth highest Indian civilian award.

== See also ==
- Alfred Lord Tennyson
