= Shaikh Zahuruddin Hatim =

Urdu poet

- Born: 1699; Shahjahanabad, Mughal India
- Died: 1781 or 1792
- Writing career
- Pen name: Hatim
- Language: Urdu

Shaikh Zahuruddin Hatim also known by the pen names of Shah Hatim or Hatim was an Urdu poet and an early exponent of the Delhi school of Urdu poetry. He lived in Delhi during the reign of Muhammad Shah.

== Career ==
Hatim was born to Fatuddin in Delhi in 1699. He was a soldier by profession and lived during the reign of the Mughal Emperor Muhammad Shah. He started writing poetry under the influence of Wali Mohammed Wali after his Diwan came to Delhi in 1722. He actively took part in the literary assemblies or the mushairas in Delhi convened by Mir, Dard and other poets.

His major poetic work is collected in two volumes, Diwan and Diwanzada. Diwanzada is smaller selection of his first volume of Diwan. He also took to teaching poetry. The preface of his Diwanzada contained the name of 45 of his pupils who studied under him. Notable among his pupils were Sauda and Rangin.

He died in 1781 according to one account. Another account mentions his death to be in 1792.

== Cited sources ==
- Sadiq, Muhammad (1995). A history of Urdu literature. Internet Archive. Delhi; Oxford : Oxford University Press. ISBN 978-0-19-563145-6.
- Bailey, Thomas Grahame (1932). A History of Urdu Literature. Association Press (Y.M.C.A.). ISBN 978-81-7000-080-8.
- Saksena, Ram Babu (1927). A History of Urdu Literature. Ram Narain Lal. ISBN 978-81-7435-161-6.
