= Kulliyyat =

Collection of the poetry of any one poet

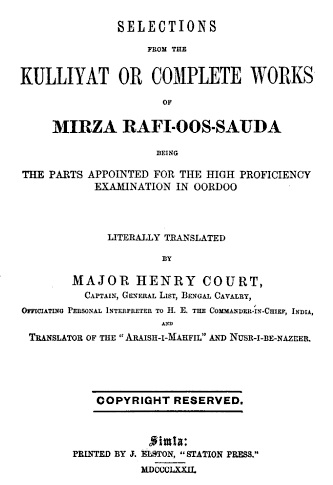
Cover of the 1872 translation of the works of Mirza Muhammad Rafi Sauda (1713–1781)

A kulliyyāt (from Arabic: كلّيّات kulliyyāt; Persian: کلیات kolliyyât; Azerbaijani: külliyyat; Urdu: کلیات; Uzbek: kulliyat; lit. 'Anthology') is a collection of the poetry of any one poet.

Kulliyat is one of the principal collection forms of Urdu poetry. Taken literally, the term signifies a complete collection of one author's poems, but in practice it is also applied to any collection of poems of one type by an author.

== See also ==
- Persian literature
- Azerbaijani literature
- Urdu poetry
