= Chalta Musafir =

1981 short story by Altaf Fatima

- First edition
- Author: Altaf Fatima
- Original title: چلتا مسافر
- Language: Urdu
- Genre: Historical fiction
- Published: 1981
- Publication place: Pakistan
- Media type: Print

Chalta Musafir is an Urdu novel by Pakistani novelist and short story writer Altaf Fatima. First published in 1981, the novel depicts the events from the 1940s to 1970s, from the partition of the Indian subcontinent to the independence of Bangladesh.
