= The Encyclopaedia of Sikhism =

Sikh encyclopaedia

The Encyclopaedia of Sikhism is a four-volume encyclopedia on Sikhism published by Punjabi University, Patiala. It was chiefly edited by Harbans Singh of the Guru Gobind Singh Department of Religious Studies of the university. The project to write the encyclopedia began in 1972 by Harbans Singh and took decades to produce, required teams of scholars, but the work was completed by the late 1990s. Publishing began in 1992 of the first volume and in 1998 the final volume was published. In-total, the encyclopedia contains around 3,500–4,000 entries. Three volumes of a Punjabi version prepared under Jodh Singh were later published in 2008, 2013, and 2009. An official, online conversion of the encyclopedia was released on 24 September 2007 and is available at eos.learnpunjabi.org. A concise version of the encyclopedia was published in 2013. An unofficial online conversion operates at thesikhencyclopedia.com. Work on a second, revised English edition is underway.

== See also ==
- Mahan Kosh
