= Yadgar-e-Ghalib =

1897 biography of Ghalib by Altaf Hussain Hali

- Author: Altaf Hussain Hali
- Original title: يادگار غالب
- Language: Urdu
- Subject: Ghalib
- Genre: Biography
- Publication date: 1897
- Publication place: British India
- OCLC: 21969593

Yadgar-e-Ghalib (English: In Memory of Ghalib), also spelled Yadgare Ghalib or Yadgar-i-Ghalib, is an 1897 biography of Urdu poet Ghalib, written by his disciple and writer/poet Altaf Hussain Hali (1837–1914). It is considered to be the first authentic work on Ghalib's life, personality, poetry and prose.

== Background ==
Hali was a disciple of Ghalib. He was deeply affected by Ghalib's death in 1869, writing a sensitive elegy on Ghalib. Friends pressed him to compile a biography of Ghalib. However his preoccupation with other works prevented him from undertaking this work early and the biography ultimately published in 1897.

== Contents ==
In the first part of the book, covering about a hundred pages, Hali has given whatever he could gather as regards the life of Ghalib. In the second part of the book, Hali has evaluated Ghalib as an author, as a poet of Urdu and Persian and as a prose writer.

Hali's general approach to Ghalib's poetry and personality borders on defence, glossing over the poet's personal shortcomings and providing relief by a perceptive analysis and interpretation of his poems.

== Reception ==
Universally regarded as a classic, Yadgar-e-Ghalib is considered to be the first authentic work on Ghalib's life, personality, poetry and prose.
