= Baksh Nasikh =

Urdu poet

- Born: 1771; Faizabad
- Died: 16 August 1838 (aged 67); Lucknow
- Occupation: Urdu poet
- Writing career
- Pen name: Nasikh (meaning obliterator or amanuensis)
- Period: Mughal era
- Genre: Ghazal
- Subjects: Love, Philosophy

Imam Baksh Nasikh (Urdu: اِمام بخش ناسِخ; 1776–1839) was an Urdu poet of the Mughal era who has been noted for his role in promoting Lucknow as a centre of poetry and innovation. He first succeeded in gaining the patronage of Meer Kazim Ali whose property he inherited. In the 1830s Nasikh developed a rivalry with fellow ghazal writer and Lucknowi Khwaja Haidar Ali Aatish. After "contemptuously" denying an offer of patronage from the nawab of Awadh, Nasikh was forced to leave Lucknow. Afterwards, he went back and forth from and to Lucknow, fleeing when minister Hakim Mehdi was in power. Nasikh finally returned from exile after the death of Mehdi in 1837 and died in Lucknow in 1839. It took until Bahadur Shah Zafar's reign for the art of ghazal poetry to be restored to its former glory, now in Delhi.

== See also ==
- List of Urdu poets
- Rekhta
- Ghazal
