= Nawab Mohammad Ismail Khan =

Indian Politician (1884 - 1958)

Mohammad Ismail Khan

President of the All-India Muslim League (U.P.)
- In office 1930–1947

Honorary Treasurer, Aligarh Muslim University
- In office 1934–1935

Vice-Chancellor, Aligarh Muslim University
- In office 1935–1937

Vice-Chancellor, Aligarh Muslim University
- In office 1947–1948

Chairman of the All-India Muslim Civil Defence Association

Chairman of the All-India Muslim League Committee of Action

Chairman of the Parliamentary Board

President of the All-India Khilafat Committee

President of the All-Parties Muslim Conference

President of the Unity Board

Personal details
- Born: August 1884 Meerut, United Provinces of Agra and Oudh, British India
- Died: 28 June 1958 (aged 73) Meerut, Uttar Pradesh, India
- Resting place: Family graveyard at the shrine of Nizamuddin Auliya
- Other political affiliations: Central Legislative Assembly, Indian Constituent Assembly, Indian National Congress
- Education: Inns of Court School of Law
- Profession: Politician, barrister, critic

Nawab Mohammad Ismail Khan (August 1884 – 28 June 1958) was an eminent Muslim politician and a leading activist of the All-India Muslim League, who stood in the forefront of the Khilafat Movement and Pakistan Movement.

Nawab Mohammad Ismail Khan is regarded as one of the founding fathers of the Islamic Republic of Pakistan due to the roles that he fulfilled for the cause of it. His position was described as only second to that of Muhammad Ali Jinnah.

This is also evident through the letters that were actively exchanged between the leaders. After the creation of Pakistan, he decisively chose to remain in India to serve the interests of underprivileged in the Indian Subcontinent.

'How can I leave my brethren here behind me?' –- he is reported to have told one of his close associates and admirers, Mr. Hassan Riaz, former newspaper editor, Manshoor, Delhi.

== Early life ==
Nawab Mohammad Ismail Khan.

Mohammad Ismail Khan was born in August 1884 in Meerut, a part of the United Provinces of Agra and Oudh. He was born to Nawab Mohammad Ishak Khan of Jehangirabad and was the grandson of the Urdu and Persian poet, Nawab Mustafa Khan Shefta (sometimes spelled as 'Shaifta') –- 'Shaifta/Shefta' being his Urdu pen-name. Upon completing his early schooling in India, Ismail Khan proceeded to England, at the age of twelve to continue his studies as a full-time boarder at Tonbridge School in Tonbridge, Kent. He went on from there to attain his undergraduate credentials from St John's College, Cambridge to thereafter become a barrister of the Honourable Society of the Inner Temple (Inns of Court School of Law).

In those days, travel to the Great Britain was by ship from Bombay and around the Cape of Good Hope, consuming in excess of a month to reach. He returned to India at the age of 24 in 1908 and opted for a career in practicing law. His father, as a career Indian Civil Service (ICS) (Indian Civil Servant) officer, had become a Judge in Allahabad and was a founding member of the Muslim League; in addition to being a close friend of Pundit Motilal Nehru's. On this job as District and Session Judge, he was greatly impressed by the eminence of Pundit Motilal Nehru as a lawyer. When M. Ismail Khan returned from England in 1908, after becoming a barrister at law, his father Nawab M. Ishak Khan arranged for him to commence his legal practice as assistant lawyer to Pundit Motilal Nehru, who prevailed upon Nawab M. Ishak Khan to permit his son to stay with him as his guest. Hence, M. Ismail Khan was sent to live with the Nehru family in Anand Bhawan for a few years. While practicing law in India, he befriended Muhammad Ali Jinnah, with whom he then entered politics.

== Political career ==
Nawab M. Ismail Khan entered politics at a very early age. As a young man, he had closely observed the agitation of the Muslims masses for a separate electorate and had seen how a delegation of the Muslims was sent (October 1906) to Lord Minto –- which secured the right of a separate representation for the Muslims.

It was about the same time—December 1906—that the Muslim League came into being through the efforts of Nawab Vaqarul Mulk and Nawab Sir Khwaja Salimullah at a meeting in Dacca—which was attended by some of the leading Muslim leaders from all over the Subcontinent. Limited as the aim of the organisation was then, it included the advancement of the political rights and interests of the Muslims of India and prevention of the rise amongst themselves of any feeling of animosity towards other communities.

Nawab M. Ismail Khan actively associated himself with the All India Muslim League and became a member of its Working Committee in 1910 –- a position which he held for more than four decades.

Nawab M. Ismail Khan would also contest and win the election to the Central Legislative Assembly, therefore having presided over the All India Khilafat Committee. He was a member of the foundation committee of the Jamia Millia Islamia, but was opposed to the Indian National Congress's campaign for Swaraj through civil disobedience. In the 1930s, Nawab M. Ismail Khan would lead the Uttar Pradesh Muslim League and served as the Chairman of the All India Muslim Civil Defence Association. In 1934 and again in 1947, he rendered his services as Vice-Chancellor of Aligarh University.

== Khilafat movement ==
After the first World War –- in which India had aided the British with the men and material -– the people of the Subcontinent expected the initiation of an execution to meet their demands by means of home rule or a reasonable share in the Government. However, these expectations were not met. Instead, they were greeted with atrocities in Punjab with the notorious "Crawling Order".

In this movement -– which is an important landmark in the freedom struggle -– Nawab M. Ismail Khan played an active part. He toured a large portion of the country preaching the Khilafat viewpoint to the masses of people. During these tours, he never claimed or desired any special privileges and worked akin to an ordinary worker.

During the movement, he was working in close contact with Congress leaders, but never for once did he feel enamoured of the so-called nationalist creed. Whenever there arose the question of Muslim interest or the nationalist interest, he only supported the cause which served the disdained Muslims best.

== Aligarh Muslim University ==
Nawab Mohammad Ismail Khan served as Vice-Chancellor of Aligarh Muslim University from 1934 to 1936 and again in 1947 to 1948.

== Sole leadership ==
Nawab M. Ismail Khan was credited for his wisdom, sagacity, and above all his sincerity that had won him a place in the All-India Muslim League and its Working Committee. In the void of M. A. Jinnah's absence from the country to attend the famous Round Table Conference in London, the sole leadership of the Indian Muslims fell in the hands of Nawab Sahib; who was the President of the All Parties Muslim Conference. Upon M.A. Jinnah's return from London, he decided to re-organise the Muslim League. During his programmes of re-organisation, Nawab M. Ismail Khan was his closest counsellor.

It was a known fact that Nawab M. Ismail Khan was an independent opinionated leader who never hesitated to speak his mind even if it meant disagreeing with Mr. Jinnah. There was an instance where Mr. Jinnah took exception to Nawab M. Ismail Khan's correspondence with Jawaharlal Nehru -– Nawab Sahib's response was an immediate resignation from the Working Committee. It was something which the Quaid had not expected and was thus taken aback by. After much persuasion by Liaquat Ali Khan, Nawab M. Ismail Khan agreed to meet Mr. Jinnah—not at his personal residence but elsewhere. In fact, they rendezvoused at Gul-e-Rana, so that the Quaid could appease the Nawab. This episode would make very interesting reading for scholars of the Pakistan Movement. Many such letters addressed to Mr. Jinnah as well as those written to Nawab M. Ismail Khan reveal his true position in the All-India Muslim League and the pivotal role that he played in the creation of Pakistan.

== Pakistan resolution ==
According to Pakistan's Dawn newspaper, "The facts are that the resolution was drafted by Quaid-i-Azam Mohammad Ali Jinnah, Nawab Muhammad Ismail Khan, Sir Sikander Hayat Khan and Malik Barkat Ali on the evening of March 21, at the residence of Nawab Iftikhar Hussain Mamdot in Lahore. It was presented to the Subject Committee on March 22 by Liaquat Ali Khan and was approved thereby".

Under the leadership of Nawab Ismail, the Muslim League reorganised its structure and adopted a new programme demanding political reforms, leading to the adoption of the Pakistan Resolution on 23 March 1940.

It was the Nawab Sahib who with his band of colleagues, like Chaudhry Khaliquzzaman and Liaquat Ali Khan, kept the Muslim banner aloft in the United Provinces.

== Simla Conference ==
In 1945, when the Simla Conference was held, Nawab M. Ismail Khan played a great part. Later, in June 1946, his name was proposed for the Interim Government along with eminent leaders such as the Quaid-i-Azam, Pandit Nehru, and Sardar Patel. But it was reported that Nawab Ismail Khan himself refused to join the Interim Government for undefined personal justifications.

== Jinnah cap ==
In 1937, the 25th Annual Conference of the All-India Muslim League was held in Lucknow under the chairmanship of Quaid-e-Azam (The Great Leader), Muhammad Ali Jinnah. Nearly seventy eminent people were summoned at Butler Palace. What was to ensue after that day would prove to be a decisive moment in the course of history. Prior to attending this historic session, Nawab Mohammad Ismail Khan suggested that the day held an auspicious meaning. It was a day when the Indian Muslim population earnestly embraced and hailed Muhammad Ali Jinnah as their foremost leader. Perceiving it to be apt, Nawab M. Ismail Khan took his Samoor Cap and generously offered it to M. A. Jinnah insisting that it would suit him well. Jinnah accepted Nawab Sahib's offer, to thereafter wear a traditional Sherwani/Achkan along with it. The outcome was visually pleasing as it greatly added to his personality. When the Quaid appeared on the dais in his indigenous attire, the massive crowd, consisting of 50,000 people, burst into loud cheers. The slogans of "Allah-ho-Akbar" (God, The Great) dominated the atmosphere and the clapping continued for a long time.

Since that fateful day, Nawab Mohammad Ismail Khan's Samoor Cap was dubbed and came to be known as the iconic "Jinnah cap" all over the Indian subcontinent and elsewhere in the world. Over the active years of the All-India Muslim League, before eventually Pakistan was consummated, Nawab Sahib's cap would be lent to M. A. Jinnah on several occasions.

== Life after the independence and death ==
"The Pioneers of Freedom" (Series I) official stamps of Pakistan. Nawab M. Ismail Khan depicted on the third row at bottom left. (Pakistan Movement personalities)

After the independence of Pakistan and India in 1947, Nawab M. Ismail Khan remained a member of the Legislative Assembly of India. He accepted in 1947 to become the vice-chancellor of Aligarh Muslim University for the second time, only to confront the challenge facing the very existence of the Muslim character of the Aligarh Muslim University -– it was Nawab M. Ismail Khan who invited Jawaharlal Nehru and Mrs. Sarojini Naidu to the convocations of the university whereby giving it the official recognition of the Indian government. The moment he sensed that the university might suffer on account of his presence, he resigned immediately and returned to Meerut in 1948. His association with the Aligarh University was deeply rooted due to his father, Nawab M. Ishak Khan, who had served the institution with passion and devotion as its trustee and secretary when it was the M.A.O. College. Nawab M. Ismail Khan also served the university for many years as its trustee.

Several efforts were made to bring him to Pakistan but legend has it that when he first visited the country, Prime Minister of Pakistan Liaquat Ali Khan offered him a carte blanche, but, as has been aptly said by Raja Amir Ahmed Khan of Mahmudabad: 'His self-respect and great nobility of character did not allow him to accept any such offer'.

After withdrawing from politics, he visited Pakistan twice, once in 1951 and then in 1955–56. His three sons G.A. Madani, Ikram Ahmed Khan (Kaiser) and Iftikhar Ahmed Khan (Adani) were all members of the Civil Service of Pakistan. G.A. Madani and I.A. Khan (Kaiser) started their careers in the Indian Civil Service in 1937 and 1939 respectively and rose to the highest civil offices in the bureaucracy. Dotingly known as 'Adani' was a literary figure and wrote books on Mirza Ghalib and Urdu poetry.

== Death ==
Nawab Mohammad Ismail Khan died on 28 June 1958 in Meerut, India at age 73. It was Nawab M. Ismail Khan's grandfather, Nawab Mustafa Khan Shefta, who had earmarked an area at the shrine of Nizamuddin for the family graveyard. This is where the prominent freedom fighter and a founding father of Pakistan, lies buried alongside three of his preceding generations. His residence, the historical Mustafa Castle in Meerut, built in 1901 in memory of Nawab Shefta, was the headquarters of the Uttar Pradesh Muslim League and the center of bustling political activity for over four decades.

The Raja Sahib of Mahmudabad further said that Nawab M. Ismail Khan was 'the product of the generation which had inherited all that was good and gracious in our culture'.

== Commemorative postage stamp ==
Pakistan Post issued a commemorative postage stamp to honor him in appreciation for his services to Pakistan Movement in its 'Pioneers Of Freedom' series in 1990.

== See also ==
- Constituent Assembly of India
- List of people on stamps of Pakistan

Academic offices
Preceded by Ross Masood	Vice-Chancellor of AMU	Succeeded by Ziauddin Ahmad
