= Suroor Jahanabadi =

Indian Urdu poet

Munshi Durga Sahai Suroor
- Born: December 1873; Jahanabad
- Died: 3 December 1910 (aged 36–37)
- Occupation: Poet
- Writing career
- Pen name: Suroor Jahanabadi
- Period: British Raj
- Genres: Ghazal, Qasida, Ruba'i, Qit'a

Munshi Durga Sahai Suroor (December 1873 – 3 December 1910), also known by the pen name of Suroor Jahanabadi, was an Indian Urdu poet.

== Biography ==
Munshi Durga Sahai Suroor was born in December 1873 in Jahanabad, a town in the Pilibhit district. He was studious from his childhood and learned Arabic and Persian and elementary English.

He worked in the editorial department of Zamana, a magazine published from Kanpur. He also contributed to many literary journals like Adib, Makhzan, Ismat and Urdu-i-Mualla.

He was an alcoholic throughout his life. He died on 3 December 1910 at a young age of 37.

== Works ==
Much of Suroor's work is published in the collections, Khumkhana-e-Suroor and Jam-i-Suroor published in 1911 Another collection Khumkada-e-Suroor was posthumously published in 1930. He wrote patriotic as well as religious poems. His major patriotic poems are Khak-e-Watan (The Dust of the Motherland), Urus-e-Hubie-Watan (The Love of the Bride of the Country), Hasrat-e-Watan (The Longing of the country), Yaad-e-Watan (Memory of the Country), Madar-e-Hind (Mother India), Gul-e-Bulbul ka fasana (The story of rose and nightingale) and Sham-o-Parwana (The Moth and the Candle). His poem Badnasib Bengal was written during the partition of Bengal proposed by Lord Curzon.

His notable historical poems are Padmani, Padmani ki Chitah (The Funeral pyre of Padmani), Sitaji-ki-Giria-o-Zari (the Lament of Sita), Dasrat ki bekarari (The Tribulations of Maharaja Dasrat), Jamuna-Ganga, Sati, and Nur Jahan ka mazar (Tomb of Nur Jahan).

Suroor's poetry is repleated with the employment of Hindi words and words of indigenous origins. His poetry is also filled with imagery from the old Hindu mythology. Much of his poetry is written in six-line stanzas or mussuddus, however he used many other forms like masnavi, rubai, qita, qasida and ghazal.

== Cited sources ==
- Saksena, Ram Babu (1927). A History of Urdu Literature. Ram Narain Lal. ISBN 978-81-7435-161-6.
- Lall, Inder Jit (1967). "Suroor Jahanabadi: An Urdu Poet of Renaissance". Indian Literature. 10 (1): 102–109. ISSN 0019-5804. JSTOR 23329081.
