= Khwaja Haidar Ali Aatish =

Mughal Urdu language poet

Khwaja Haider Ali Aatish
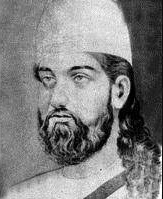
- Khwaja Haider Ali Aatish
- Born: 1764
- Died: 1846
- Occupation: Urdu poet
- Writing career
- Pen name: Aatish
- Language: Urdu
- Period: Mughal India
- Genre: Ghazal
- Notable works: Kulliyat-e-Khwaja Haider Ali Atish; Deewan-e-Aatish

Khwaja Haider Ali Aatish (1764 –1846) of Lucknow was an Urdu poet. Khwaja Haider Ali Aatish Lakhnawi is one of the giants of Urdu literature. Aatish and Imam Baksh Nasikh were contemporary poets whose rivalry is well known. Both had hundreds of disciples. The era of Aatish-Nasikh was a golden era for Urdu poetry in Lucknow. Aatish is mostly known for his ghazals, and for his amazing and different style of poetry.

== Life ==
His ancestors had moved from Delhi to Lucknow. His focus on subjective experience, examining how people retain dignity in suffering, set him apart from other Luckhnavi ghazal writers like Nasikh, who emphasised the technical aspects of Ghazal writing. He also wrote poems in the Khamariyyat tradition, to protest the ills of the feudal society.

It is also said that Aatish belonged to Faizabad, his father had died early during his childhood, but his deep instinctive taste of poetry gave Aatish easy access to the court of Nawab Mohammed Taqi Khan Taraqqi who took him to Lucknow. In Lucknow he became a disciple of Mushafi, an important poet of the Lucknow school. Soon after the death of Nasikh, Aatish stopped writing poetry. Some critics rank him after Mir and Ghalib.

Pandit Dayashankar Nasim was a student of Aatish.

== Works ==
- Kulliyat-e-Khwaja Haider Ali Atish
- Deewan-e-Aatish

== See also ==
- List of Urdu poets
