= Mirza Muhammad Rafi Sauda =

Urdu poet

Coordinates: 59°41′15″N 6°26′14″E

Mirza Muhammad Rafi
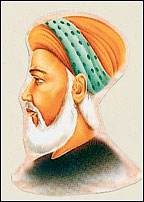
- Born: 1713; Shahjahanabad, Mughal India
- Died: 1781 (aged 67–68); Lucknow, Mughal India
- Writing career
- Pen name: Sauda
- Language: Urdu

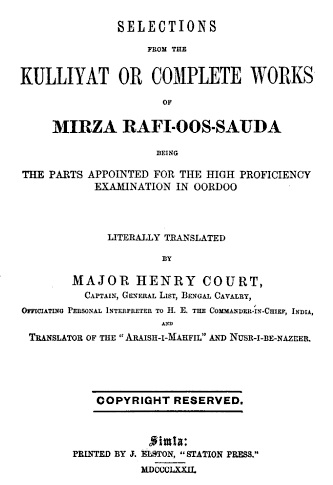
Cover of the 1872 translation of the works of Mirza Muhammad Rafi Sauda

Mirza Mohammad Rafi 'Sauda' (Urdu: مِرزا مُحمّد رفِیع سَودا; 1713–1781) was an Urdu poet in Delhi, India. He is known for his Ghazals and Urdu Qasidas.

== Biography ==
He was born in 1713 in Shahjahanabad (Old Delhi), where he was also brought up. At the age of 60 or 66, he moved to Farrukhabad (with Nawab Bangash), and lived there from 1757 to about 1770. In A.H. 1185 (1771–72) he moved to the court of Nawab of Awadh (then in Faizabad) and remained there until his death. When Lucknow became the state capital, he came there with Nawab Shujauddaula. He died in A.H. 1195 (1780–81) in Lucknow.

== Ustads and shagirds ==
Sulaimān Qulī Ḳhān 'Vidād' and Shaikh Zahuruddin Hatim were his Ustads (teachers of Urdu poetry). King Shah Alam was Shagird (student of Urdu poetry) of Sauda. He was also Ustad of Shujauddaulla. Nawab Āṣif ud-Daulah gave him title of Malkushshu'ara and annual pension of Rs 6,000.

== Works ==
Initially he composed in Persian, but switched to Urdu on the advice of his ustad, Ḳhān-e Ārzū. His work was translated in 1872 by Major Henry Court, Captain, Bengal Cavalry. Kulliyat of Sauda was compiled by Ḥakīm Sayyid Aṣlaḥ. ud-Dīn Ḳhān wrote the introduction. Sauda's works from his Kulliyat are:

- Masnavi dar hajv-e hakim ghaus مثنوی در ھجوِ حکیم غوث
- Masnavi dar hajv-e amir-a daulatmand bakhil مثنوی در ھجوِ امیرِ دولت مند بخیل
- Masnavi dar ta'rif-e shikar مثنوی در تعریفِ شکار
- Masnavi dar hajv-e pil rajah nripat singh مثنوی در ھجو پِل راجن نری پت سنگھ
- Masnavi dar hajv-e sidi faulad khan kotval-e shahjahanabad مثنوی در ھجو سیدّی فولاد خان کوتوالِ شاجہان آباد
- Masnavi dar hajv-e fidvi mutavatan-e panjab kih darasal baqal bachchah bud مثنوی در ھجو فدوی مُطاوِتانِ پنجاب کی دراصل بیقل بچاہ بد
- Masnavi dar hajv-e chipak mirza faizu مثنوی در ھجو چپک مرزا فیضو
- Qissah-e darvesh kih iradah-e ziyarat-e ka'bah kardah bud قصّہِ درویش کہ ارادہِ زیارتِ کعبہ کرد بد
- Mukhammas-e shahr ashob مخاماصِ شہر آشوب
- Qasidah dar madh-e navab vazir imad ul-mulk قصیدہ درمدہِ نواب وزیر عماد الملک
