= Altaf Hussain Hali =

Urdu poet

- الطاف حسین حاؔلی
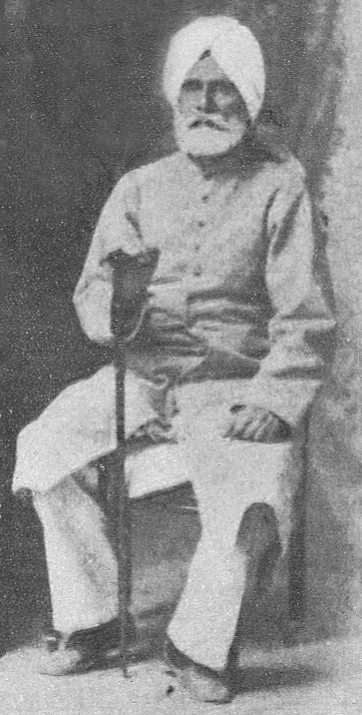
- Born: Altaf Hussain; 1837; Panipat, North-Western Provinces, British India
- Died: 31 December 1914 (aged 77); Panipat, British India
- Occupations: Writer, biographer and poet
- Writing career
- Years active: 1860–1914
- Notable works: Musaddas-e-Hali; Yadgar-i-Ghalib; Hayat-i-Saadi; Hayat-i-Javed

Altaf Hussain Hali (Urdu: الطاف حسین حاؔلی – Alṭāf Ḥusain Ḥālī; 1837 – 31 December 1914), also known as Maulana Khawaja Hali, was an Urdu poet and writer.

== Early life ==
He was born in Panipat to Khwaja Ezad Baksh and was a descendant of Abu Ayyub al-Ansari, a close companion of the Islamic prophet Muhammad. Hali belonged to the Panipat Ansari clan, whose members included Lutfullah Khan Sadiq, the Diwan-i-Khalisa and governor of Shahjahanabad in the Mughal empire, and Sher Afgan Panipati, the governor of Multan.

Hali's father died when he was nine years old and his mother suffered from dementia. He was in the care of his elder brother Khwaja Imdad Husain after the death of his parents and when he was fifteen, upon the forcing of his elder brother, married his cousin Islam-un-Nisa. Hali studied, and memorized, the Quran under Hafiz Mumtaz Husain, Arabic language under Haji Ibrahim Husain and Persian under Syed Jafar Ali. Resentful of hinderance to his studies by marriage, at age seventeen, he travelled to Delhi to study at the madrasa opposite Jama Masjid, which was called 'Husain Baksh Ka Madrasa.'

Hali composed an essay in Arabic that supported the dialectics of Siddiq Hasan Khan, who was an adherent of Wahhabism. His teacher, Maulvi Navazish Ali, belonged to the Hanafi school and when he saw the essay he tore it up. At this time, Hali adopted the takhallus "Khasta", which means "the exhausted, the distressed, the heartbroken". He showed his work to the poet Ghalib (1797-1869), who advised him: "Young man, I never advise anyone to write poetry but to you I say, if you don't write poetry, you will be very harsh on your temperament".

After a three-year stay in Delhi, 1852 to 1855, he returned to Panipat and soon his first son was born. In the following year he was employed at the Collector's Office in Hissar.

== Writing ==
The Indian rebellion of 1857 was an armed uprising in British India against the oppressive and destructive British colonial rule and was also popularly remembered as the 'First War of Independence'. This was a turning point in Hali's life because he was an eyewitness to the catastrophe. His family took in a widowed girl who lived with them for the rest of her life. Her plight left a deep impression on Hali and he composed two poems on the condition of women: Munajaat-e-Beva (Supplication of the Widow) and Chup ki Daad (Homage to the Silent). Therefore, Syeda Saiyidain Hameed calls Hali "Urdu's first feminist poet".

In 1863, in Delhi, he was appointed tutor to the children of Nawab Mustafa Khan Shefta of Jahangirabad, a position he held for eight years. In 1871, he moved to Lahore, where he was employed at the Government Book Depot from 1871 to 1874, where his task was to correct Urdu translations of English books. This brought him into contact with a wide range of literature and led him to writing the first book of literary criticism in Urdu, Muqaddama-e-Shair-o-Shairi. This was published as an introduction to his collected poems, Divan (1890) and then on its own (1893),

Annemarie Schimmel called Hali the "founder of literary tradition in Urdu". He had, by this time, changed his takhallus from "Khasta" to "Hali", which means "contemporary" or "modern".

While in Lahore, Hali saw a new form of Mushaira, where instead of reciting poetry at will, poets were given a subject to write about. This was begun by Muhammad Husain Azad and the Director of Public Education, W. R. M. Holroyd. Hali composed four poems for this purpose: Nishat-e-Umeed (Delight of Hope), Manazra-a-Rahm-o-Insaaf (Dialogue between Mercy and Justice), Barkha Rut (Rainy Season) and Hubb-e-Watan (Patriotism).

From 1874 until 1889 Hali taught at the Anglo Arabic School in Delhi. He was granted a stipend by the Chief Minister of Hyderabad State in 1887, after which he immediately took retirement from the school to be able to devote himself full-time to creative writing. While at the Anglo Arabic School, he came into contact with Sir Syed Ahmad Khan. Sir Syed advised Hali to "write something like Marsiya-e-Andalus (dirge for Spain)" on the condition of the Muslims of India. Later Urdu writers called this moment: "This is the place where the Quom got a poet and the poet got a Quom". Hali therefore began to compose his epic poem, the Musaddas e-Madd o-Jazr e-Islam ("An elegiac poem on the Ebb and Tide of Islam").

Sir Syed acclaimed it upon its publication in 1879 in a letter to Hali:

It will be entirely correct if the modern age of Urdu poetry is dated from the date inscribed in Musaddas. I do not have the power of expression to describe the elegance, beauty and flow of this poem. ... I am undoubtedly its inspiration. I consider this poem among those finest deeds of mine that when God asks me what did you bring with you, I will say “Nothing but that I got Hali to write the Musaddas!”

Sir Syed also called it the "mirror of the nation's condition and an elegy expressive of its grief". In the Musaddas Hali condemned what he saw as dogmatism, obscurantism and bigotry, and he attributed the decline of India's Muslims to the discouragement of dissent and the placing of religious rituals above the spirit of religion. He concluded the poem by warning Muslims to repair their ship before it is ship-wrecked in a storm.

The poem was very popular and apart from the first couple of editions, Hali dedicated the poem to the nation and took no royalties. Some scholars of Pakistani nationalism also consider the Mussadas an important text for the articulation of a future Muslim nation, Pakistan, which eventually was created in 1947. During an international seminar on Hali held in Delhi on 29 November 2001, scholars concluded that Hali could not have written the Musaddas without reading at least 5,000 pages of Islamic history.

After Sir Syed Ahmad Khan's death, Hali wrote his biography, Hayat-e-Javed, which was published in 1901. He was awarded the title Shamsul Ulema ("Sun among Scholars") by the British India government. Hali's Mussadas-e-Hali also contains 'Mehnat ki Barkaat', which is an extract intended to spread awareness in Muslims.

== Death and legacy ==
At the age of 52 in 1889, Hali finally returned to Panipat, where he shared home with his wife for the remaining twenty-five years of his life. Altaf Hussain Hali died in 1914. Pakistan Post issued a commemorative postage stamp in his honor on 23 March 1979 in its 'Pioneers of Freedom' series. "His great 'Musaddas' is one of the most inspiring poems in Urdu literature and had a lasting influence on the minds and attitudes of the Muslims in the sub-continent and continues to inspire them to this day."

According to a major Pakistani English-language newspaper, Altaf Hussain Hali and Maulana Shibli Nomani played key roles in rescuing Urdu language poetry in the 19th century, "Hali and Shibli rescued Urdu poetry. They re-conceived Urdu poetry and took it towards a transformation that was the need of the hour."

In the same above-mentioned newspaper article, Baba-e-Urdu (Father of Urdu) Maulvi Abdul Haq is quoted as saying, "Outstanding poetry happens when there is poetic departure and a poet is able to take universal meaning out of immediate events."

== Works ==
Hayat-i-Javed, a biography of Sir Syed Ahmed Khan

- A biography of Ghalib, Yadgar-e-Ghalib – life and works of Mirza Asadullah Khan Ghalib (1797–1869), a legendary Urdu language poet of the 19th-century
- A biography of Saadi Shirazi, Hayat-e-Saadi – life and works of celebrated Persian language scholar and poet 'Saadi Shirazi' (1210–1292) of the 13th-century
- A biography of Sir Syed Ahmed Khan, Hayat-e-Javed – life and works of a renowned educationist, scholar and social reformer 'Sir Syed Ahmed Khan' (1817–1898) of the 19th-century
- Hali also wrote a poem "Barkha Rut"

Naat title	Lyrics by	Sung by	Remarks
Woh Nabion Mein Rahmat Laqab Paanaywala	Altaf Hussain Hali	Junaid Jamshed	A still very popular Naat song written in the 19th century, sung by many singers in both Pakistan and India
