= Masoom Moradabadi =

Indian Urdu-language journalist

- معصوم مرادآبادی
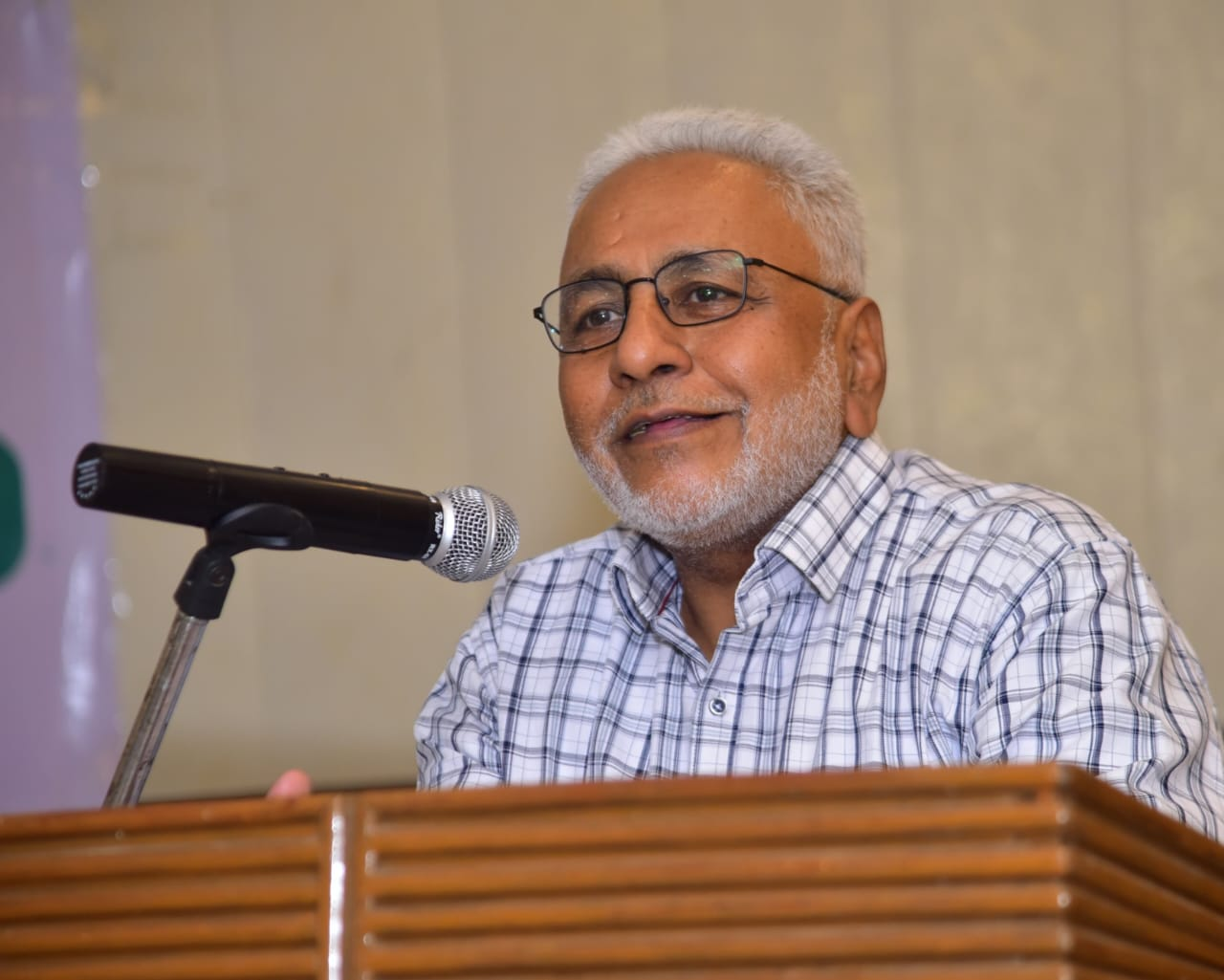
- Born: Masoom Ali Khan; 15 September 1961 (age 65); Moradabad, Uttar Pradesh, India
- Occupations: Journalist, columnist, editor, calligrapher
- Years active: 1982–present
- Known for: Urdu journalism, khaka nigari (biographical sketches)

Masoom Moradabadi (Urdu: معصوم مرادآبادی, born 15 September 1961) is an Indian Urdu-language journalist, columnist, editor, and calligrapher. Active since the early 1980s, he is noted for his contributions to Urdu journalism and his literary biographical sketches (khaka nigari). Over a career spanning more than three decades, he has edited several Urdu publications, reported extensively on parliamentary affairs, and is widely recognized for promoting Urdu journalism and literary culture in India.

== Early life and education ==
Masoom Moradabadi was born as Masoom Ali Khan on 15 September 1961 in the Katar Shahid neighborhood of Moradabad, Uttar Pradesh.

He received early education at Jamia Al-Huda and Nagar Palika Junior High School in Moradabad. After studying Persian at Madrasa Imdadiya, he moved to Delhi in 1977 and enrolled at Madrasa Aliya, Fatehpuri, where he pursued Arabic and Persian. He later completed Urdu literary degrees including "Urdu Aalim" from Idara Adabiyat, Hyderabad (1984), "Adeeb-e-Kamil" from Jamia Urdu Aligarh (1985), and earned an M.A. in Urdu literature from Rohilkhand University, Bareilly (1986–87).

== Career ==
Initially trained in calligraphy, a skill passed down from his maternal grandfather, Moradabadi shifted to journalism during the 1980s following the decline of traditional hand-written typesetting due to the emergence of Urdu software technologies.

He began his professional career in 1982 with the fortnightly journal Awaaz, published by All India Radio, where he worked as a calligrapher. During this period, he also started contributing talks to the Urdu Service's youth programme Nai Nasl Nai Roshni, and several of his articles appeared in Awaaz.

After brief stints in calligraphy and layout design, he joined the weekly Nai Duniya in 1986, where he received formal training in field reporting. He was the first Urdu journalist to report from inside the Babri Masjid and to conduct an interview with Bal Thackeray. In 1991, he founded the Urdu fortnightly Khabardar-e-Jadeed, and in 2003 launched the daily Jadeed Khabar, which operated in print until 2016 and now continues as a news portal.

He has reported on Indian parliamentary proceedings for more than three decades and contributed columns and reports to various Urdu newspapers. His weekly columns have appeared in major Urdu dailies across India, and his writings are featured in literary journals such as Aaj Kal, Aiwan-e-Urdu, Naya Daur, and Urdu Dunya.

Moradabadi has been recognized for his editorial and journalistic contributions by Urdu academies in Delhi, Uttar Pradesh, and West Bengal. In 2005, he was honoured with the Urdu Journalism Award by the Uttar Pradesh Urdu Academy.

He has interviewed several prominent literary and cultural figures, including poets and fiction writers, which were later compiled in the book Bil-Mushaafa.

As a journalist, he has traveled for literary and media engagements to the United States, United Kingdom, Saudi Arabia, United Arab Emirates, Pakistan, and Libya.

=== Media advisory committee ===
In 2016, Moradabadi was appointed as a member of the Rajya Sabha Media Advisory Committee by then Chairman of the Rajya Sabha, Mohammad Hamid Ansari. He represented the Urdu media in the 15-member committee chaired by senior journalist Neerja Chowdhury.

Moradabadi serves as General Secretary of the All India Urdu Editors Conference and the All India Muslim Majlis-e-Mushawarat (registered). He is also Secretary of the Delhi Union of Journalists and has served on advisory committees including the Parliament Media Advisory Committee (Rajya Sabha), Doordarshan Urdu Advisory Panel, and the Delhi Urdu Academy Governing Council.

He has contributed to efforts aimed at preserving and strengthening Urdu journalism in India.

=== Calligraphy ===
Moradabadi received early training in calligraphy from his maternal grandfather, Munshi Abdul Qayyum Khan, who once worked for Maulana Azad. He later refined his calligraphy skills at the Ghalib Academy in New Delhi under notable calligraphers like Muhammad Khaliq Tonki and Yusuf Qasmi.

=== Tablighi Jamaat connection ===
Moradabadi's early exposure to the Tablighi Jamaat came through family and geography. As a teenager, he trained in Urdu calligraphy at the Ghalib Academy, located adjacent to the Nizamuddin Markaz. His uncle, Mohammad Abdul Malik Jamaee, was a founding member of the Jamaat and a close associate of its founder, Muhammad Ilyas Kandhlawi.

Despite his early proximity to the Markaz, Moradabadi publicly commented on the Jamaat’s role during the COVID-19 outbreak in 2020. He acknowledged the leadership's failure to act preventively but emphasized that government agencies shared equal responsibility, and called for a judicial inquiry under Delhi High Court supervision.

=== Interviews ===
Moradabadi has conducted interviews with a wide range of literary figures including poets such as Akhtar ul Iman, Kaif Bhopali, Habib Jalib, Ali Sardar Jafri, Ahmad Faraz, Iftikhar Arif, Muzaffar Warsi, Bekal Utsahi, Malikzada Manzoor Ahmad, Bashir Badr, Javed Akhtar, Ata ul Haq Qasmi, Surender Sharma, and Salahuddin Parvez. Among fiction writers, he interviewed Joginder Paul, Bhagwan Gidwani, Bhisham Sahni, and Habib Tanvir. These were later compiled in his book Bil-Mushaafa.

=== Recognition ===
Moradabadi has received multiple awards for his journalistic work, including:

- Maulana Abdul Wahid Siddiqui Award by Uttar Pradesh Urdu Academy (2005)
- Delhi Urdu Academy Journalism Award (2006)
- Abdul Razzaq Malihabadi Award, West Bengal Urdu Academy (2009)
- Maulana Mohammad Ali Jauhar Award (2013)
- Global Urdu Day Award (2013)
- Lifetime Journalism Service Award, West Bengal Urdu Academy (2022)

In addition to these honours, Moradabadi has been invited to speak at international forums. In 2024, he delivered a keynote address at the Indian Institute of Mass Communication (IIMC), where he emphasized the sacrifices made by Urdu journalists during India's freedom struggle, including figures like Maulvi Muhammad Baqir, Maulana Azad, and Hasrat Mohani.

His book on Maulvi Muhammad Baqir was also featured in the theme pavilion of the 2023 New Delhi World Book Fair.

In 2008, Moradabadi represented Indian Urdu journalism at the World Urdu Conference in Jeddah, Saudi Arabia, organized by Maulana Azad National Urdu University and the Indian Consulate. The event featured major Urdu literary figures and highlighted global revival of Urdu.

== Views ==
=== Advocacy for Urdu and journalism ===
Moradabadi has consistently advocated for the preservation and revival of Urdu journalism and language in India. In a 2010 panel at the India Islamic Cultural Centre, he attributed the decline of Urdu journalism to dwindling Urdu-medium schools and a lack of institutional support. He emphasized the role of journalism as a medium of social reform and the need for rigorous training and factual reporting.

In February 2025, he strongly criticized Uttar Pradesh Chief Minister Yogi Adityanath's remark calling Urdu learners "katthe mullahs" (ignorant clerics). Moradabadi described the statement as a reflection of the Chief Minister’s mindset and referenced Justice Anand Narain Mulla, who famously said: "I can give up my religion, but not my mother tongue—Urdu." He also expressed concern about systemic sidelining of Urdu in BJP-ruled states, including the replacement of Urdu with Sanskrit in school curricula.

=== Reform and political commentary ===
He has objected to attempts to mainstream Narendra Modi in Urdu media without addressing past communal violence. In 2012, he strongly criticized the Urdu weekly Nai Duniya for publishing a sympathetic interview with Modi, calling it an effort to whitewash historical wrongs.

In 2013, amid the Muzaffarnagar riots in Uttar Pradesh, Moradabadi described the violence as part of a dual strategy by the ruling Samajwadi Party and Vishwa Hindu Parishad, alleging that communal unrest was being stoked in regions where the SP lacked political dominance. He questioned why Chief Minister Mulayam Singh Yadav met VHP leader Ashok Singhal during the escalation and suggested the state allowed the violence to occur in order to later present itself as a saviour of minorities.

In 2015, as spokesperson of the All India Muslim Majlis-e-Mushawarat (AIMMM), Moradabadi rejected media reports suggesting ISIS had a presence in India, calling them "baseless and misleading". He expressed concern that such narratives were being used to cast suspicion on Muslim youth and to justify arbitrary arrests. AIMMM, under his communication, emphasized that Indian Muslims had unanimously condemned ISIS and Al-Qaeda as un-Islamic and stood ready to resist their presence if it ever arose. The body also passed a resolution condemning terrorism globally while distinguishing between such groups and legitimate struggles like the one in Palestine.

In 2015, Moradabadi, criticized the CBSE for imposing an AIPMT dress code that barred headscarves. He called it a violation of religious freedom and warned it could deter Muslim girls from appearing for the exam.

In 2016, ahead of the Uttar Pradesh assembly elections, Moradabadi observed that Muslim voters were politically pivotal in over 150 constituencies with significant Muslim populations. He noted that despite Mayawati fielding a large number of Muslim candidates, the community remained skeptical due to her past alliances with the BJP, contrasting this with their historical trust in the Samajwadi Party under Mulayam Singh Yadav.

Following the 2017 Supreme Court verdict on instant triple talaq, Moradabadi criticized both the All India Muslim Personal Law Board for inaction and the Indian government for exploiting the issue for political gain. He urged Muslim leadership to embrace internal reform while accusing the Modi administration of using Muslim women’s rights as a diversion from unresolved communal violence cases such as the Gujarat riots, and lynching incidents involving Pehlu Khan and Mohammed Akhlaq.

In September 2018, writing in Akhbar-e-Mashriq on the government's ordinance criminalizing instant triple talaq, Moradabadi argued that the new law would cause further hardship to Muslim women rather than provide relief. He questioned how a woman whose husband is jailed for triple talaq would manage the survival of her family, noting that since the Supreme Court had already invalidated instant triple talaq, the woman would be unable to remarry or seek closure. He criticized the ordinance as politically motivated and potentially punitive.

In June 2022, during widespread protests following controversial remarks by BJP spokesperson Nupur Sharma about the Prophet Muhammad, Moradabadi stated that Indian Muslims had lost trust in the government’s willingness to act impartially. He criticized the delayed response, noting that disciplinary action against BJP figures came only after international backlash from Gulf countries, not in response to domestic Muslim protests. He cautioned that while Muslims have deep emotional reverence for the Prophet, they should avoid street agitation, as it often harms their own interests.

=== Minority rights and state policy ===
In the lead-up to the 2014 elections, Moradabadi criticized the Congress for neglecting Muslim interests but encouraged tactical voting to counter the BJP’s rise. He later dismissed the Modi government’s ₹100 crore madarsa modernization fund as symbolic and lacking follow-through on structural reforms proposed in the Sachar Committee report.

Moradabadi has also condemned extrajudicial killings and profiling of Muslims in terrorism cases. In 2009, he joined other Urdu journalists in demanding a re-investigation into the Batla House encounter case, citing arbitrary arrests and prolonged detentions of Muslim youth.

In 2016, Moradabadi criticized the renaming of the Ministry of Minority Affairs' office building from "Paryavaran Bhawan" to "Deendayal Antyodaya Bhawan" by then minister Najma Heptulla. Referring to the decision as "unfortunate", he questioned why a building dedicated to minority affairs could not be named after leaders from minority communities such as Maulana Azad or Mother Teresa. Speaking in his capacity as an invitee to the All India Muslim Personal Law Board, he argued that naming institutions after ideologically affiliated figures marginalized the contributions of secular and inclusive icons.

=== Religious politics and sectarian dynamics ===
In 2014, Moradabadi accused cleric Mahmood Madani of legitimizing Narendra Modi’s image through symbolic gestures like defending his refusal to wear a skullcap. Muradabadi saw this as part of a broader BJP strategy to enlist religious endorsements from Muslim leadership.

Earlier in 2011, during tensions involving the All India Ulama & Mashaikh Board (AIUMB), he expressed doubts about foreign funding and the financial transparency of Sufi institutions, warning of political and sectarian implications.

Moradabadi has also challenged dominant media narratives about terrorism. In a 2005 article in The Milli Gazette, he asserted that Hindu actors were also involved in insurgent activity in Jammu and Kashmir, a reality he claimed was often ignored in public discourse.

== Literary works ==
As of 2022, Moradabadi has authored approximately twelve books, four of which focus on Urdu journalism. He has also written numerous newspaper columns and feature articles.

In 2024, he published a monograph on noted Urdu journalist G.D. Chandan, titled Monograph on G.D. Chandan, issued by the Urdu Academy, Delhi. The book was listed among the top ten notable Urdu books of the year by The Wire.

Moradabadi’s works have been praised for blending literary style with journalistic insight.

=== Khaka Nigari (biographical sketches) ===
Masoom Moradabadi’s writings in the genre of khaka nigari (biographical sketches) have been noted for their stylistic blend of literary and journalistic features. His collections include profiles of figures from politics, literature, science, and journalism.

His early work Kya Hue Woh Log (2004) includes sketches of individuals such as Mahatma Gandhi, Maulana Abul Kalam Azad, Mohammad Ali Jauhar, Subhas Chandra Bose, Khan Abdul Ghaffar Khan, Lal Bahadur Shastri, Muqeemuddin Farooqi, Haroon Rashid, Jaun Elia, Haji Anis Dehlavi, and A. P. J. Abdul Kalam.

His 2025 book Chehre Padha Karo features personalities such as Shamsur Rahman Faruqi, Gopi Chand Narang, Shamim Hanfi, Dilip Kumar, A. P. J. Abdul Kalam, Obaid Siddiqi, and Mohammad Khaliq Tonki.

Its companion volume, Nageene Log (2025), contains sketches of figures including Athar Faruqi, Tahseen Munawwar, Moin Shadab, M. Afzal, Haqqani Al-Qasmi, Ahmad Ibrahim Alvi, Nadeem Siddiqui, Suhail Waheed, and Hakim Syed Ahmad Khan, as well as essays on Azhar Inayati, Popular Meeruthi, Naeema Jafri Pasha, Shakeel Rasheed, Tariq Manzoor, Akhtarul Wasey, Shafi Kidwai, Mohsin Usmani, Shahpar Rasool, Azeem Akhtar, Maudood Siddiqui, Arif Aziz, and Hasan Zia.

=== Urdu publishing and readership ===
Moradabadi has also played a role in sustaining Urdu literary publishing during a time of sharp decline in readership and institutional support. Reflecting on the downturn of Urdu book culture, he noted how Delhi’s once-vibrant Urdu Bazaar—home to over 100 printing presses—has largely vanished due to lack of demand.

In 2003, he founded Khabardar Publications in response to a fellow writer’s difficulties in publishing in Urdu. One of the first books he released was Shahar Mein Curfew by Vibhuti Narain Rai, a novella portraying communal unrest. This effort reflected Moradabadi’s commitment to preserving Urdu’s literary space despite market challenges.

In 2022, Moradabadi participated in the bicentennial celebrations of Urdu journalism held in Kolkata by the West Bengal Urdu Academy. In his published reflections, he highlighted that Jam-e-Jahan-Numa, the world’s first Urdu newspaper, was launched in Kolkata on 27 March 1822 by publisher Harihar Dutta and edited by Sadasukhlal. He described Kolkata as the birthplace of newspapers in multiple Indian languages and emphasized its foundational role in Urdu media history.

In 2023, Moradabadi publicly protested the sudden closure of the Maktaba Jamia outlet in Delhi’s historic Urdu Bazaar. The bookstore, long associated with Jamia Millia Islamia and originally envisioned by Zakir Husain, had served generations of Urdu readers. Moradabadi was among the first to announce its closure on social media and played a key role in mobilizing public opinion against the decision. Following widespread criticism and protests, including by former MANUU Chancellor Firoz Bakht Ahmed, the shop was reopened. Moradabadi's advocacy underscored the vulnerability of Urdu institutions and the urgent need for community-led efforts to preserve them.

=== Political commentary and Urdu press engagement ===
As editor of Jadeed Khabar, Moradabadi has been a consistent voice on major political and communal developments in India. His editorial writings have appeared regularly in Urdu press roundups and national media digests.

In December 2015, writing on the aftermath of the Babari Masjid demolition, he criticized the inaction on commitments made by political leaders in 1992, noting that "a massive structure has now been erected on the site, despite court orders to maintain status quo".

He also expressed concern over rising RSS influence in government affairs. In a 2015 editorial, he wrote: "The RSS had assured in 1948 that it would not interfere in politics. This assurance has now been breached," referring to meetings between top RSS and central government figures.

On the political rise of AIMIM, he remarked that the party’s attempts to mobilize Muslims, Dalits, and OBCs in a shared platform marked a significant shift in identity politics.

Reacting to the 2010 exile of painter M. F. Husain, Moradabadi wrote that if Husain was compelled to renounce Indian citizenship, "it would be a black day in Indian history", arguing that India's failure to protect the artist would damage its democratic image globally.

=== Notable books ===
Moradabadi's major works include:

Authored

- Bil-Mushaafa (1996) – a compilation of interviews with prominent literary figures
- Kya Hue Woh Log (2004) – a collection of biographical sketches
- Urdu Sahafat aur Jang-e-Azadi 1857 (2008) – a historical study on the role of Urdu journalism during the 1857 uprising (Hindi edition: 1857 ki Kranti aur Urdu Patrakarita)
- Urdu Sahafat ka Irtiqa (2013) – a study of the evolution of Urdu journalism
- Nawa-e-Khamosh (2019) – second volume of literary and biographical profiles
- Urdu Sahafat: Aaghaz ta 1857 ka Mukhtasar Jaiza (2020) – published by the National Council for Promotion of Urdu Language (NCPUL), New Delhi
- Jahan Noor Hi Noor Tha (2024) – travelogue of Hajj journey
- Tareekh-e-Moradabad (2023) – a historical monograph praised as a major scholarly contribution
- Sar Sayyed ka Qayam-e-Meerut (2024) – published by Sir Syed Academy, Aligarh Muslim University
- Chehre Padha Karo (2025) – ISBN 978-93-6058-448-1; a collection of literary and journalistic biographical sketches

Edited

- Maulana Iftikhar Faridi: Hayat-o-Khidmaat (2004)
- Urdu Sahafat ka Manzar Nama (2014) – edited volume on trends in Urdu journalism
- Javed Habib: Hujum se Tanhaai Tak (2015) – a biographical narrative
- Maulana Muhammad Ali Jauhar: Aankhon Dekhi Baatein (2020)
- Maulana Muhammad Ilyas aur Unki Tablighi Tehreek (2022)
- Auwaleen Shaheed Sahafi: Maulvi Muhammad Baqir (2023)
- Prof. Mohsin Usmani Nadvi ki Tasaneef: Ahl-e-Ilm o Adab ki Nazar Mein (2024)
- Munshi Abdul Qayyum Khan Khattāt (2025) – published by NCPUL
