= Brij Narayan Chakbast =

Indian Urdu poet (1882–1926)

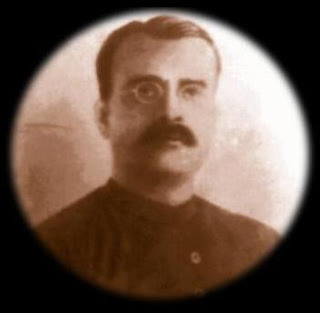
- Born: 19 January 1882; Faizabad, North-West Provinces, British India (now Uttar Pradesh, India)
- Died: 12 February 1926 (aged 44); Raebareli, United Provinces, British India (now Uttar Pradesh, India)
- Father: Pandit Udit Narayan Chakbast

Brij Narayan Chakbast (19 January 1882 – 12 February 1926), also spelled as Brij Narain Chakbast, was an Indian Urdu poet.

== Life ==
Chakbast (1882–1926) was an Urdu poet. He was born on 19 January 1882 in a Kashmiri Pandit family settled in North India. Chakbast was born in Faizabad (near Lucknow) in 1882. His father Pandit Udit Narayan Chakbast, was born at Lucknow in, circa 1843, and he was also a poet. Pandit Udit Narayan was deputy collector, the highest post that any Indian could have at that time. After the death of his father in 1887, the family moved to Lucknow and they started living in Kashmiri Mohalla of Lucknow. Chakbast was educated in Lucknow, and he became a successful lawyer. Chakbast married in 1905, but lost his wife and first child in 1906. He married again in 1907, and settled down as a practising lawyer at Lucknow. On 12 February 1926, he collapsed at the railway station in Rae Bareli and died a few hours later at the age of 44.

Chakbast made a thorough study of Urdu poetry. He defended Daya Shankar Kaul Nasim when it was suggested that he was not the author of the epic Gul Bakawali. He was actively involved in social and political affairs, and was a strong proponent of the Home Rule and actively participated in the Home Rule Movement.

== Education ==
Chakbast's early education took place in Faizabad. Following his father's death, his family relocated to Lucknow, where he completed the rest of his education. He earned his B.A. degree in 1905 and his L.L.B. in 1907 from Canning College, Lucknow, which was affiliated with Allahabad University at that time. This institution later became part of Lucknow University. After completing his studies, Chakbast went on to establish a successful career as a lawyer.

== Works ==
Chakbast was primarily a poet but his prose is also considered at par with his poetry. Chakbast's premature death was a great loss for Urdu but whatever he left is exemplary and is considered among the gems of Urdu literature. He was strongly influenced by Ghalib, Mir Anees and Khwaja Haidar Ali Aatish. Chakbast was primarily a nazm poet. He began his poetic career with a nazm in 1894. He wrote nazms, mathnawi, a play, and about 50 ghazals. His Ramayan ka ek Scene is strongly reminiscent of Marsiya of Mir Anis. His verses from his ghazal

Zindagi kya hai anasir mein zahur-e tarteeb,
Maut kya hai ini ajza ka pareshan hona.

Zarra Zarra hai mere Kashmir ka mehmaan nawaaz,
raah mein pathar ke tukdoon ne diya pani mujhe.

Subh-e Watan is collected works of Chakbast as its title and many of its poems reflect about his intense patriotism, predominantly a central theme of his poetry.

Khak-e-Hind

Gulzar-e-Naseem a mathnawi,

Ramayan ka ek scene musaddas

Nala-e-Dard

Nala-e-Yaas, and a play named

Kamla

Kulliyat-e-Chakbast and Maqalaat-e-Chakbast is the complete collection of Chakbast's works in poetry and prose that was published posthumously on the birth centenary of the poet, compiled by Kalidas Gupta 'Raza' around 1983.

Chakbast considered himself a poet of the nation. His main aim of the poetry was to influence the youth to love and respect his country and work for its development.

== Legacy ==
The 2015 film Masaan starts with and contains various examples of Urdu poetry by Chakbast along with the works of Basheer Badr, Akbar Allahabadi, Mirza Ghalib and Dushyant Kumar. Explaining this as a conscious tribute, the film's lyrics writer Varun Grover explained that he wanted to show Shaalu (portrayed by Shweta Tripathi) as a person whose hobby is to read Hindi poetry and shaayari, as this is a common hobby of millennial and generation x youngsters in Northern India, especially when in love, but this aspect is rarely shown in Hindi films.

== See also ==
- Marsiya
- Musaddas
- Mir Anis
