= Mirza Salaamat Ali Dabeer =

Indian Urdu poet (1803–1875)

- Born: 29 August 1803; Delhi, Mughal Empire
- Died: 6 March 1875 (aged 71); Lucknow, North-Western Provinces, British India
- Occupation: Urdu poet
- Writing career
- Pen name: Dabeer
- Period: Mughal era
- Genre: Marsiya
- Subject: Battle of Karbala
- Website: mirzadabeer.com

Mirza Salaamat Ali Dabeer (Urdu: مِرزا سلامت علی دبِیر; 29 August 1803 – 6 March 1875) was an Urdu poet who excelled and perfected the art of Marsiya writing. He is considered the leading exponent of Marsiya Nigari or marsiya writing along with Mir Anees.

Mirza Dabeer was born in 1803 in Delhi. He started reciting marsiya since childhood during muharram ceremonial gatherings called majalis (singular-majlis). He started writing poetry under the tutelage of Mir Muzaffar Husain Zameer. Dabeer himself was an erudite scholar of his time. He migrated from Delhi to Lucknow, where he found suitable environment to develop and demonstrate his skills in marsiya writing. According to Maulana Muhammad Husain Azad in Aab-e-Hayat quoting Tazkira-e-Sarapa Sukhan, there is confusion regarding his father's name because of two different names mentioned in Tazkira-as-Ghulam Husain /Mirza Agha Jan Kaghazfarosh. Mirza Dabeer died in Lucknow in 1875 and is buried there.

== Works ==
According to Muhammad Husain Azad in Aab-e-Hayat: Mirzā Sahib died on the 29th of Muharram, AH 1292 [1875–76], at the age of 72 years. In his lifetime he must have written at least three thousand elegies. Not counting his salāms and nauhas and quatrains. He wrote a dotless elegy (be-nuqta) of which the opening verse is:

Hum tale-e-Huma murad hum rasa hua

Meaning:

My far-reaching imagination has the same fortune-star as the Huma.

In it, he used (the dotless) Utārid or Atarid (Mercury) instead of Dabeer for a pen-name. And there's no doubt that with him elegy composition in India reached its conclusion. Now no such time will come, nor will such accomplished persons be born (Frances W. Pritchett translation).

List of Marsiya by Dabeer:

1. Kis sher ki Amad hai ki Run kaanp raha hai
2. Dast-e-Khuda Ka Quwat-e-Bazoo Husain hain
3. Bilqees paasbaan hai ye kiski janaab hai
4. Paida Shua-E-Mehar Ki Miqraaz Jab Huee

Although Dabeer's poetic expression found expression in the genre of marsiya but he made use of other forms of Urdu poetry, viz., salaam and rubai, he seldom wrote ghazals too. A couplet from one of his salaams is a clear example of his genius comparable to Ghalib:

Hurr fida pyaasa jo Shah par ho gaya
Ai salami, qatra tha samandar ho gaya!

Meaning:

When the thirsty Hurr (willingly) sacrificed his life for the Shah (Hussain);
(Know) O salami, (O pilgrim) In truth the drop became the entire ocean!

Naqaash naqsh, Kaatib o Khat, Baani o Bina,
Bood o Nabood, Zaat o Sifat, Hasti o Fana,
Aadam Malak, Zameen Falak, Gard e Kimiya,
Duniya o Deen, Hadoos o Qidam, Banda e khuda,
Sab, Shahid e Kamal e Shahe Mashraqain hain,
Jab Tak Khuda Ka Mulk hai, Malik Hussain hain.

== Dabeer and Anis rivalry ==
Anis and Dabeer rivalry is the most debated and talked about rivalry in Urdu literature. Their rivalry led to the development of two distinct styles/schools of Marsiya-nigari or marsiya writing at its inception. The staunch supporters of each of the masters identified themselves as "Aneesiya" and "Dabeeriya". The impact of rivalry was so intense that the followers could neither free themselves from their influence nor surpass either master's brilliance. Although the populace divided themselves into two separate groups the two poets remained at cordial terms and acknowledged each other with great respect. When Anis died in 1874, Dabeer penned the following couplet as a tribute to the departed poet:

Aasman Be Mah-i-Kamil Sidrah Be Ruhul Amin
Toor-i-Sina Be Kalimullah Mimbar Be Anis

== Books on Mirza Dabeer ==
Description of some books published on the subject of Mirza Dabeer and his work by different writers/researchers and publishers of Indo-Pak:

1 – Moazna-E-Anees-O-Dabeer, by Shibli Nomani
2 – Anees Aur Dabeer by Dr. Gopi Chand Narang
3 – Books Compiled/written by Dr. Syed Taqi Abedi:

- Mujtahid Nazm Mirza Dabeer
- Abwab-ul-Masa'ib
- Silke Salame Dabeer
- Mushafe Farsi (Work of Mirza Dabeer in Persian Language)
- Taleh Mehar
- Musnuyate Dabeer

4 – Mirza Salaamat Ali Dabeer compiled by Eldon A. Mainyu (English)

== Tribute to poet in Urdu literature ==
=== Tribute – Digital ===
35 Marsiya video series based on event between 28th Rajab to 8th Rabi' al-awwal, titled Az madina ta madina was released on 3 January 2014, by "Mafss Noha Academy" Mumbai, India, and recited by Rahil Rizvi (Marsiya & Noha Khwan from India). Video series consist 8 marsiya based on topic and 2 soaz written by Mirza Salaamat Ali Dabeer.

== Legacy ==
Dabeer, along with Anis, left an everlasting influence on Urdu literature and marsiya in particular. Marsiya, in its content and matter, allowed the two masters to demonstrate their artistry and command of Urdu language and idiom. At the same time epical nature of marsiya covered and dealt with entire range of emotions and ideas. It has both mystical and romantic appeal. All the contemporary and succeeding generations of poets who adopted marsiya as the genre of poetic expression and also others who took to other forms of poetry found it difficult to break away from the trends and standards set by these two masters. The names of Dabeer and Anis are inextricable whenever Urdu Marsia is mentioned. In short, marsiya attained its zenith under the poetic genius of Anis and Dabeer. Marsiya became synonymous with the names of these two masters and also the form-musaddas- adopted by them became synonymous with the identity of marsiya. Dabeer along with Anis influenced two major aspects of the socio-cultural life of the Indian sub-continent. One is literature and other is azadari tradition of the sub-continent.

== See also ==
- Mir Anis
- Ustad Sibte Jaafar Zaidi
- Mohsin Naqvi
- Taqi Abedi
- Marsiya
- Azadari
- Ashura

== Suggested readings ==
1. Rooh-e-Anees (Muqaddma): Masood Hasan Rizvi
2. Urdu Marsia ka Irteqa: Maseehuz-Zaman
3. Anees Shanasi: Gopi Chand Narang
4. Mirza Slamat Ali Dabeer: Mohd Zaman Azurdah (1981)
5. Intekhab-e-Marasi : U. P. Urdu Academy.
6. Muntakhab marasi-i Dabir by Dabir (1980)
7. Javahir-i Dabir: Mirza Salamat Ali Dabir ke 14 marsiye (1986)
8. Mirza Dabir ki marsiyah nigari by S. A Siddiqi (1980)
9. Mu'azanah-yi Anis va Dabir: Mutala'ah, muhasabah, taqabul by Irshad Niyazi (2000)
10. Talash-i Dabir by Kazim Ali Khan (1979)
11. Urdu Marsiya by Sifarish Hussain Rizvi
12. Urdu marsiye men Mirza Dabir ka maqam by Muzaffar Hasan Malik (1976)
13. Sha'ir-i a'zam Mirza Salamat Ali Dabir: Tahqiqi mutala'ah by Akbar Haidari Kashmiri (1976)
