= List of Marsiya writers in Urdu =

Following is a list of Marsiya writers in the Urdu language.

== Dakhani School ==
- Waheed Akhtar (1934–1996), Urdu poet, writer, critic, orator, and one of the leading Muslim scholars and philosophers of the 20th century

Baqer Amanatkhani (1905-1990), urdu poet, wrote 36 Marsiyas, more than 435 salaams, 200 Nauhas totalling more than 40,000 couplets in praise of Ahlulbayt.

== Dehlavi School ==
- Mirza Muhammad Rafi Sauda (1713–1781),
- Khwaja Mir Dard (1721–1785),
- Mir Taqi Mir (1723–1810),

== Awadhi School ==
- Azeem Amrohvi
- Nasim Amrohvi (-1987)
- Kaifi Azmi (1919–2002)
- Mir Babar Ali Anis (1802–1874),
- Mirza Salaamat Ali Dabeer (1803–1875),
- Josh Malihabadi (1898–1982),
- Mohd Afzal "Farigh Sitapuri" (27.01.1843 - 17.06.1900)
- Ali Haider Tabatabai (1854–1933), born 1854 in Awadh, died 1933 in Hyderabad Deccan, India, was a poet, translator and a scholar of languages, Dr.Syed Ali Imam zaidi (Gauhar)Great-grandson of Mir Babar Ali Anees.Syed Mustafa Meerza (Rasheed)Maternal grandson of Anees.Syed sajjad Husain (shadeed)

== Pakistani School ==
- Faiz Ahmad Faiz (1911–1984),
- Hilal Naqvi (b.1950)

== See also ==
- Marsiya
- List of Urdu-language poets
- Muhammad Ali Naqvi - Marsiyakhwani
