= Taqi Abedi =

Indian-Canadian physician (born 1952)

Syed Taqi Abedi
- Born: Syed Taqi Hassan Abedi; 1 March 1952 (age 74); Delhi, India
- Occupations: Author, research scholar, poet, orator, critic, and journalist
- Writing career
- Genres: Marsiya, Rubai and Ghazal
- Subjects: Battle of Karbala by Mir Anis/Dabeer, Allama Iqbal Ghalib, Faiz and Urdu Literature in North America
- Website: drtaqiabedi.com

Syed Taqi Hassan Abedi (Urdu: سید تقی حسن عابدی; born 1 March 1952) is an Indian-Canadian physician who is also poet and scholar of the Urdu language.

== Compilation in Persian literature ==
Abedi compiled a two-volume book, Kuliyat-e-Ghalib Farsi, collecting the poetry of Mughal-era Mirza Ghalib in Persian, which was published by the Ghalib Institute in Delhi. Abedi believes that, while Mirza Ghalib was well known for his poetry in Urdu, he was more inclined towards Persian and composed excellent poems in that language.

In collaboration with Iran's Ministry of Arts and Culture, Indian & Pakistani ambassadors jointly organised a ceremony at Tehran in September 2010 for release of Abedi's "Kulliyat-e-Ghalib" in Persian. Speaking on the occasion, he pointed out that publishing of Mirza Ghalib's Persian poetry book in Iran would provide a new path for closer relationships between Indo-Iranian literary circles. Referring to Persian poetry by Mirza Dabeer and Mir Anees, he also stated that the unknown feature of Ghalib's Persian poetry was his couplets which were far greater in number than his couplets in Urdu.

== Work on Hindu religion Poets ==
Abedi has researched poetry in praise of Muhammad and Ahl al-Bayt by various Hindu poets, and compiled some booklets containing Naats, Marsias, Soaz and Salam, like Gopi Nath Aman, Kalidas Gupta Raza and Dalloo Ram Kausari. He especially selected the female Hindu poet "Roop Kunwar Kumari" and highlighted her devotion for Muhammad; his book on her, "Roop Kunwar Kumari," was published in Multan, Pakistan. It provides a detailed anthology of this female Urdu poet and her undiscovered poetic devotion to Ahl al-Bayt. Abedi also discusses her mode of expression with Hindised Bhakti terminology in a Persianised style for her poetry in Soaz, Salam and Marsia. This combination of expressive styles distinguished her among her contemporaries. A sample couplet: "Ali's feet shelter all! Ali's loved by the two souls / No one knows Ali's reality! But the Prophet and God Almighty.

== Work on Mir Anis and Mirza Dabeer ==
Abedi's book Kulliyat-e-Anees consists of 579 Rubais of Mir Anis with a 150-page preface discussing the different aspects of poetry of Anis. Part of his research on Anis was the publication of "Tajzia-e-Yadgar Marsia". The work of Abedi on Mir Anis was an attempt to trace out the hidden facets of his life, illness, death and behavior with discipline.

He also compiled a book "Rubayat-e-Dabeer" and presented selected collection of Salams and Rubais from the treasury of Mirza Dabeer's poetry. Speaking to a seminar at Karachi he discussed some features of his new compilations containing therein comparison between Anis and Dabeer and also stated that comparative analysis of both these contemporary poets was not new for Urdu literary circle and gave the reference of 100-year-old publication "Mawazna-i-Anees-o-Dabeer" written by Shibli Nomani. Abedi also provided amazing similarities between the two poets that both had total age of 72 years, born with gape of one year i.e. 1802 and 1803, and died in 1874 and 1875 respectively. Anis and Dabeer were masters of their similar field and they were never disrespectful to one another. However, it was the lifestyle of Lucknow in which we noticed about the people who began to admire Anis and Dabeer according to their own choices but both poets never encouraged the contemporary development and success of grouping.

== Work on Poet Faiz Ahmed Faiz ==
Although different scholars including Gopi Chand Narang, Shams ur Rahman Faruqi, Shan-ul-Haq Haqqee, Shamim Hanafi, Sajjad Zaheer, etc. have written various articles on different aspects of Faiz, in the compiled book "Faiz Fahmi" consisting of 162 articles in total, in this book 41 articles have been written by Taqi which discussed undisclosed aspect of Faiz. He also analysed unbiased characters of Faiz thoughts and message by dedicating a chapter "mistakes in Faiz poetry" and a comparison with Josh Malihabadi.

Five articles written by Faiz i.e. (i) progressive literary ideology (ii)Josh as a revolutionary poet (iii)films and culture (iv) Beirut under the Israeli attack, and (v) Lenin Peace Award ceremony, have been incorporated in the Faiz Fahmi. This book is an encyclopedia to understand the theme and work of Faiz, it also contains some rare pictures which provide a background of the scene.

In his book Faiz fahmi, Taqi Abedi presented him as a poet whose poetry had remained unstudied. While delivering a lecture on his book "Faiz Fahmi" organized in 2011 at Alhamra Arts Council by Lahore Arts Council, he revealed that 1,800 books have been written on Faiz but it was misfortune that we ourselves never studied and learnt about our Urdu writers and poets. On the other hand, if Faiz were a Persian at least 4000 books might have been written on his subjects and personality. Recently new book "Faiz Shanasi – (knowing Faiz)" by Taqi has also been published.

== Research on Allama Iqbal ==
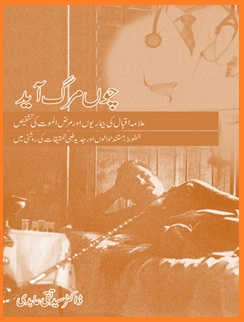
Title page of Urdu Language Book "Choon Marg Ayed" pertains to Muhammad Iqbal by Iqbal Academy

While delivering lectures on Allama Iqbal Day at Azad National Urdu University, Hyderabad, India in October-2009, Taqi highlighted the "Iqbal Ka Falsafa-e-Ishq" that Iqbal was influenced with Room and followed his philosophy of "Ishq" in his prose and poetry.

Referring his two Urdu language compilations, Choon Marg Ayed and Iqbal Kay Irfani Zaweye as a keynote speaker on Allama Iqbal Annual Day organized in November 2010 at East-West University, Chicago, Taqi pointed out that "Javaid Nama" written by Allama Iqbal can be selected and discussed as one of the classic work in line with the importance of books "Gulistan and Diwan-e-Hafiz" by Saadi and "Shahnama" of Firdausi. He also referred the Maulana Room's Masnavi for the same comparison. During his speech he also brought forward that his book "Choon Marg Ayed" (diseases suffered by Allama Iqbal) was published by Iqbal Academy which was established by the Government of Pakistan. In this Book he has composed extracts from the various letters written by Allama Iqbal in order to provide a picture of disease and their impact on the life of Iqbal.

== Publications ==
Taqi Abedi has published many works, including these:

| Title | Place of publication | Subject |
|---|---|---|
| Gulshane Roya | Karachi, Pakistan | |
| Joshe Maodat | Hyderabad, India | |
| Shaheed | Baluchistan, Pakistan | Ayatullah Morteza Motahhari |
| Tajzeye Yadgare Anis | Delhi, India | Mir Anis |
| Ramooz-e-Sha'eri | Lahore, Pakistan | Knowledge can be confined into a book – that is an art(a book on poetry and its tools) |
| Izhar-e-Haq | Toronto, Canada | Poet Fareed Lucknowi–unrecognised flower of Mir Anis legacy |
| Inshaallha Khan Insha | Lahore | Insha Allah Khan 'Insha' |
| Aaroos-e-Sukhan | Lahore | Compilation of Articles (his own), published in the Weekly Urdu Time New YorkWeekly Pakistan Link and Daily Siyasat, India |
| Iqbal Kay Irfani Zaweye | Lahore | Allama Iqbal |
| Mujtahid Nazm Mirza Dabeer | Lahore | Mirza Dabeer |
| Musnuyate Dabeer | Delhi | Mirza Dabeer |
| Abwab-ul-Masa'ib | Published in Delhi | Dabeer |
| Silke Salame Dabeer | Lahore | Mirza Dabeer |
| Mushafe Farsi | Delhi | Work of Dabeer in Persian Language |
| Taleh Mehar | Lahore | Dabeer |
| Kayenate Najm | Delhi | Mirza Tajamul Hussain (alias Najm Afandi) and his |
| Roop Kunwar Kumari | Multan | Female Urdu Poet of Hindu Religion & Devotee of Ahlul-Bayt |
| Adbi Mojeza | Multan | A classical researched collection of Sermon by Ali Ibn Abi Talib Without applying Arabic Alphabet "Alf" in Arabic Language |
| Sabd-e-Sukhan | Delhi | 3rd Compilation and Publication of Articles published |
| Ghalib Diwan-e-Naat-o-Manqabat | Delhi | Mirza Ghalib |
| Mushaf-e-Taghazzul | Lahore | Mirza Tajamul Hussain (Najm Afendi) |
| Taseere Matam | Multan | Najm Afendi |
| Fikre Mutmayena | Multan | Allama Najm Afendi |
| Durbar-e-Risalat | Lahore | Poetry in praise of Muhammad |
| Najmi Maya | Multan | Najm Afendi |
| Dure Daryae Najf | Multan | Allama Najm Afendi |
| Zikrye Durbaran | Lahore | Insha Allah Khan 'Insha' |
| Huwal Najm | Multan | Najm Afendi |
| Khosha-e-Anjum | Multan | Najm Afendi |
| Raveshe Inqalab | Multan | Najm Afendi |
