= Insha Allah Khan =

- Born: c. 1752; Murshidabad, Bengal Subah, Mughal Empire
- Died: 19 May 1817; Lucknow, Oudh State
- Writing career
- Language: Urdu, Persian and Hindi
- Genres: poetry and linguistics
- Notable work: Darya-e-Latafat

Syed Insha Allah Khan (c. 1752 – 19 May 1817), known as Insha, was an Indian poet and writer in Urdu, Persian and Hindi. A multi-talented polyglot in the courts of Lucknow and Delhi in the late eighteenth and early nineteenth century, he was the author of the first grammar of the Urdu language, Darya-e-Latafat, which was written in Persian.

== Life ==
Insha's father, Syed Hakim Mir Masha Allah Khan, was a famous physician and aristocrat. During a period of disturbance in Delhi, he moved to Murshidabad in Bengal, where Nawab Siraj-ud-Daula was his patron. His son Insha was born in Murshidabad.

During the reign of Shah Alam II, Insha came to Delhi. In 1780, he joined the army of Mirza Najaf Khan, and later gained access to the royal court. His poetic skills and sarcastic wit made him well-known, and also unpopular with the poets of Delhi, such as Mirza Azim Beg. After the decline of Mughal power which led to the blinding of Shah Alam II in 1788, Insha decided to try his luck in Lucknow. In 1791, he joined the court of Mirza Sulaiman Shikoh (a Mughal prince then living in exile in Lucknow), entering into a legendary rivalry with the Mirza's ustad, the poet Mashafi, and eventually displacing him from his position. After some years, Insha moved on to the court of Saadat Ali Khan, the new ruler of Awadh, an association which writers such as Muhammad Husain Azad believe led to a decline in his poetry and his young son died during this period. Eventually, Insha fell from the ruler's grace after making a joke at his expense. He spent his last years bereft of patronage, in poor health, till his death in 1817.

== Work ==
Insha was a versatile poet, who composed verses in Urdu, Persian, Arabic, and occasionally in Hindi, Punjabi, Marathi, Kashmiri, Purabi, Marwari, Pashto and Chagatai. His chief works are collected in his diwan Kullyat-i-Insha, consisting of Urdu and Persian ghazals, as well as a volume of poems in rekhti (imitating the colloquial speech of women). He wrote ghazals, rubaiyat (quatrains), qatat in many languages, several Urdu and Persian masnavis, odes, satires, and also tried his hand at unconventional forms such as the riddle and the magic spell. His themes too are unconventional - no other poet would choose to write an entire ghazal about a woman's undergarment. Muhammad Husain Azad in Aab-e-Hayat, his critical study of Urdu poetry, compiles a list of Insha's work which also includes such eccentricities as a hunting poem about Saadat Ali Khan in Persian, satires complaining about heat and flies, a poem about a wedding of elephants, and a masnavi on the subject of cock-fighting.

Apart from being a virtuoso poet, Insha was a linguist, who knew many Indian dialects intimately. He is known for two remarkable works which display aspects of this talent: Rani Ketki Ki Kahani, a short romance which is one of the earliest prose works in Hindi (no Arabic or Persian words are used), and Darya-e-Latafat (1807), a work in Persian on the grammar and rhetoric of the Urdu language, which also presented a linguistic study of the dialects of Delhi and Lucknow. This pioneering work established grammatical terminology used to this day.

Rani Ketki Ki Kahani was adapted as a television show by Doordarshan on DD National, the Indian national public broadcaster, billed as the "first written story in Hindi".

== Bibliography ==
Selected works (available online):

- Kullyat-i-Insh'allah Khan, collection of Urdu and Persian ghazals
- Darya-e-Latafat (in Persian), Urdu linguistics, grammar and rhetoric
- Rani Ketki Ki Kahani and Kunwar Udaybhan Charit in Devanagari script
- Lataif-us-Saadat, humorous jokes written in the court of Saadat Ali Khan II

== See also ==
- Taqi Abedi
