= Musaddas =

Genre of Urdu poetry

Musaddas (Arabic: مسدس, romanized: musaddas, plural: مسدسات, musaddasāt; Persian: مسدس, romanized: musaddas; Urdu: مسدس, romanized: musaddas) is a genre of Urdu poetry in which each unit consists of 6 line-sestain (miṣrā'). Famous early writers employing this form are Mir Babar Ali Anees and Mirza Salaamat Ali Dabeer. Maulana Altaf Husain Hali and Syed Waheed Akhtar are other well-known poets who find expression in this form of poetry. Particularly iconic is Hali's "Madd-o-Jazr-e-Islam" as an example of this form.

== See also ==
- Mukhammas
