= Jashn-e-Adab =

Jashn-e-Adab (Sahityotsav) is a society for poetry and literature which has been established in 2012 to promote and preserve the literary heritage of Hindi and Urdu language through ‘Jashn-e-Adab poetry festival’.

The aim of these festivals is to celebrate and cherish the indigenous cultural heritage through Mushairas- poetry symposiums, Ghazal singing, Daastangoi-conventional way of story telling, Plays, Bait-bazi, Kathak dance, Qwwali etc. These festivals have lined up acclaimed writers, poets, theater artists, singers, scholars, journalists and critics from across the globe and generations, and has provided platform to fresh litterateurs along with luminaries.

Jashn-e-Adab (Sahityotsav) has tried to raise awareness towards the contemporary situation of art and literature in society and also on its impact through debates, seminars, paper presentations and panel discussions with dignitaries of different fields. Jashn-e-Adab (Sahityotsav) also organizes book exhibitions and provide the platform for release of books written by budding writers. Jashn-e-Adab also confers annual awards and accolades to the literary dignitaries to celebrate and acknowledge their unabating love & services to any form of literature.

== History ==
Jashn-e-Adab (Sahityotsav) Poetry festivals have been organised in two phases annually as a three-day event each in cities across country wherein Delhi has been the prime centre. These festivals also witness various sessions of panel discussions to enlighten the audience about the history and the contemporary situation of theatre, films and literature and their role. These sessions are attended and curated by eminent writers, scholars, historians, films and theatre artists from the country and abroad.

=== Notable participants ===
- Karan Singh
- Ashok Chakradhar
- Abhigyan Prakash
- Piyush Mishra
- Irshad Kamil
- Pankaj Tripathi
- Ali Fazal
- Gopichand Narag
- Prof Shamim Hanfi
- Javed Akhtar
- Muzaffar Ali
- Shamsur Rahman Faruqi
- Nida Fazli
- Rahat Indori
- Tom Alter
- Prof Seyed E Hasnain
- Padma Bhushan Pt. Sajan Mishra
- Sunita Rajwar
