= Zameer Akhtar Naqvi =

Pakistani scholar (1940–2020)

Syed Zameer Akhtar Naqvi

Personal life
- Born: Syed Zameer Akhtar Naqvi; 24 March 1944 Lucknow, United Provinces, British India
- Died: 13 September 2020 (aged 76) Karachi, Sindh, Pakistan
- Cause of death: Cardiac arrest
- Education: University of Karachi (PhD)
- Occupation: Urdu poet, scholar
- Website: allamasyedzameerakhtarnaqvi.com

Religious life
- Religion: Shia Islam

Syed Zameer Akhtar Naqvi (Urdu: علامہ ڈاکٹر سید ضمیر اختر نقوی) also known as Zameer Hassan Naqvi, was a Pakistani writer, poet and religious scholar born in Lucknow, British India, and permanently moved to Karachi, Pakistan, in 1967.

He was a scholar, writer, and researcher and had written multiple books on religion and poetry. He was the editor of Al Kalam magazine besides heading the Anees Academy.

== Education ==
He studied at Lucknow until graduation. He did his matriculation at Hussain School Lucknow and intermediate at Government Jubilee College Lucknow.

He received his post graduate degree from the Shia College Lucknow.

== Death ==
He died at age 76 years on 13 September 2020 in Aga Khan University Hospital, Karachi due to sudden cardiac arrest.

Funeral prayer was held at Imam Bargah Shuhda-e-Karbala, Ancholi, and he was buried in Wadi-e-Hussain graveyard in Karachi.

== Books ==
He authored more than 300 books on various subjects, including Urdu poetry, Islamic history, literature, culture, religion, philosophy, sociology, science, oratory, languages, journalism, events of Karbala, and current affairs..

A collection of rare manuscripts, photographs and other documents belonging to him were purchased by Library of Congress in Washington DC during the 1990s. It is called the Naqvi collection.

== Awards ==
- On compilation of the book Josh Malihabadi, Marthiyah, Mir Anees Award was awarded in 1989
- Commonwealth award, London by Anjuman-e-Farogh-e-Aza in 1999

== See also ==
- Mir Anees
- Kalbe Sadiq
