= Killing of Wahidur Rahman =

Pakistani educator

- Date: 25 April 2015; 11 years ago
- Venue: Latif Square, Karachi
- Location: Pakistan
- Cause: Shooting
- Participants: 4
- Deaths: Wahidur Rahman
- Burial: Karachi, Pakistan
- Suspects: Target killers
- Charges: Murder

On 25 April 2015, Wahidur Rahman (also known as Yasir Rizvi), a Pakistani professor at the University of Karachi and journalist was killed by four people who were on a motorcycle.

== See also ==
- Killing of Sibte Jafar
