= Wadi-e-Hussain =

Cemetery in Karachi, Pakistan

Wadi-e-Hussain وادیء حسین
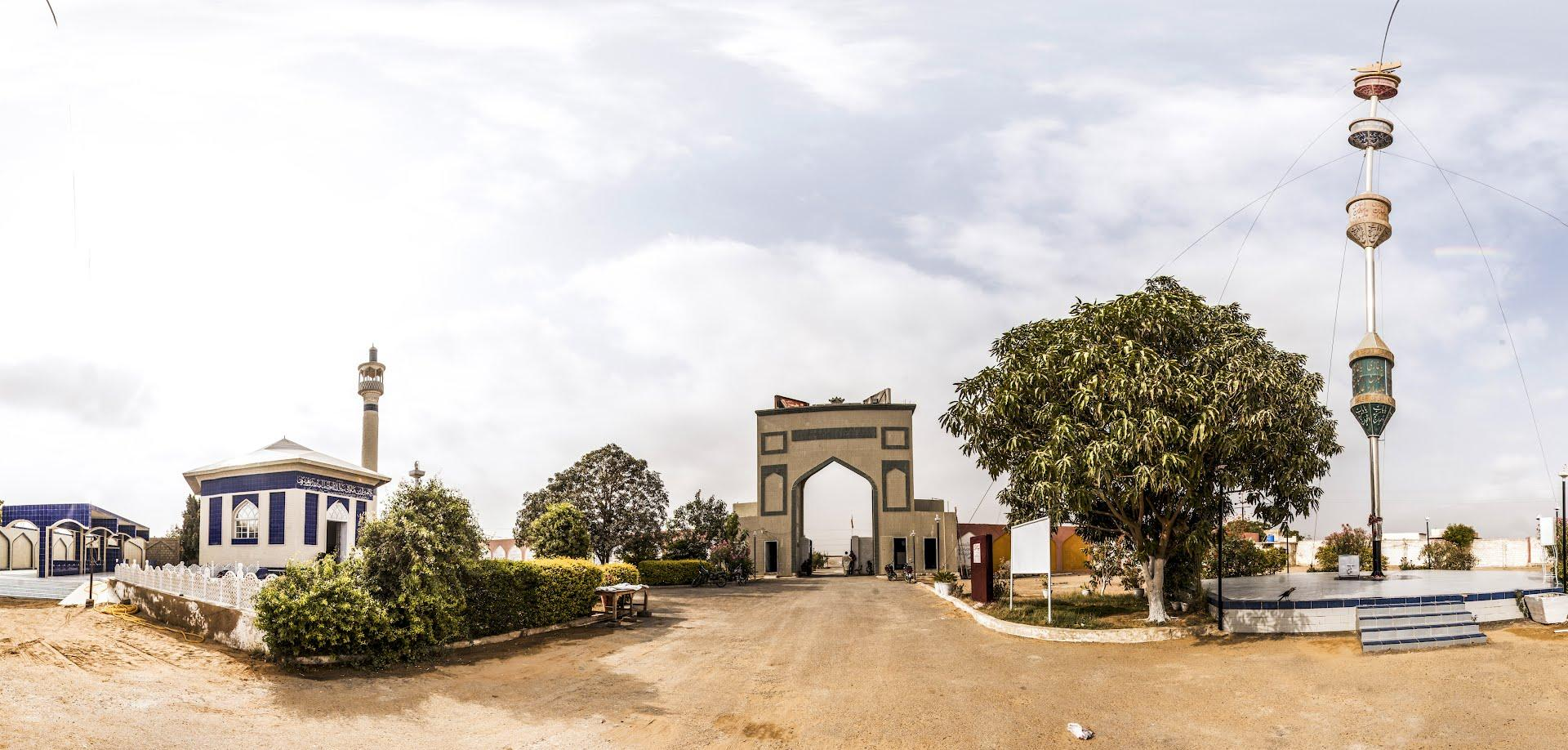
- Interactive map of Wadi-e-Hussain وادیء حسین

Details
- Location: Gadap Town, Karachi
- Country: Pakistan
- Coordinates: 24.976294°N 67.240607°E
- Type: Public
- Owned by: Syed Muhammad Aalam Zaidi
- No. of graves: 26,500 (approximately)
- Website: www.wadi-a-hussain.com

Wadi-e-Hussain (Urdu: وادئ حسین, The Valley of Hussain) is a large cemetery situated in the northern part of Karachi, along the Karachi–Hyderabad Motorway. It is the first cemetery in Pakistan to have an online presence.

Wadi-e-Hussain has a dedicated section for children's graves and is a well-known burial site for Shiite Muslims. The cemetery is also adorned with special lights on occasions such as Eid al-Fitr, Eid al-Adha and Mid-Sha'ban.

== Notable burials ==
- Allama Dr. Syed Zameer Akhtar Naqvi – Religious scholar
- Ustad Sibte Jaafar Zaidi – Academic
- Syed Ali Aslam Jafri – Justice of the Sindh High Court
- Mahmood Ali – Radio/television and theatre artist
- Khan Muttaqi Nadeem – Lawyer, poet, author
- Mehnaz – Radio/television singer
- Naseer Turabi - Poet
