= Delhi Urdu Akhbar =

Urdu newspaper founded by Moulvi Muhammad Baqir

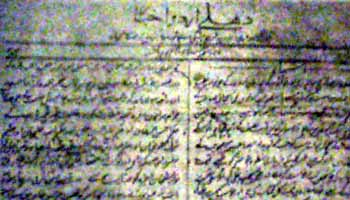
- 1837
- Founder(s): Moulvi Muhammad Baqir
- Editor: Moulvi Muhammad Baqir
- Founded: 1837
- Language: Urdu
- Headquarters: Delhi, British India
- City: Delhi
- Country: British India

Delhi Urdu Akhbar (دہلی اردو اخبار) published from Delhi, India in 1837 AD was the first Urdu language daily newspaper. Moulvi Muhammad Baqir was its first editor.

The newspaper came about following the government amending the "Press Act" in 1834 to allow newspaper publication.
