= Shamim Hanafi =

Indian Urdu writer (1938–2021)

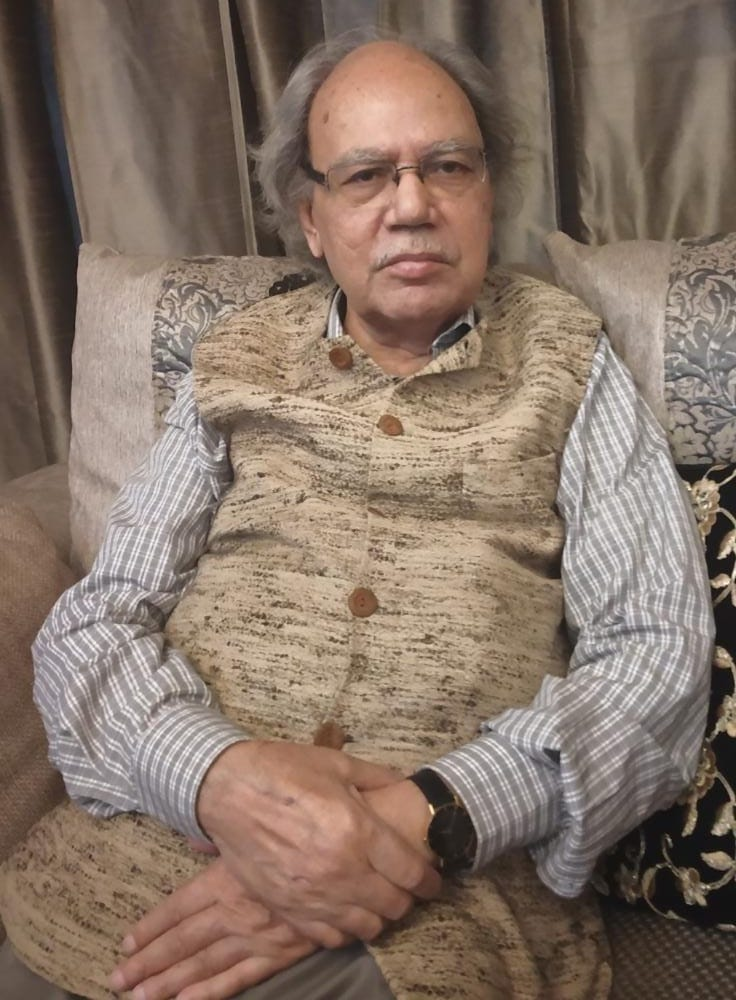
- Born: 17 November 1938; Sultanpur, Uttar Pradesh, British India
- Died: 6 May 2021 (aged 82); New Delhi, India
- Occupations: Urdu author, critic and dramatist
- Awards: Ghalib Award, Jnangarima Manad Alankaran award, International award for promotion of Urdu literature

Academic background
- Education: Allahabad University, Aligarh Muslim University
- Influences: Firaq Gorakhpuri, Khaleel-Ur-Rehman Azmi

Academic work
- Notable works: Jadīdiyyat kī falsafiyānah asās, Naʼī shiʻrī rivāyat

Shamim Hanafi (17 November 1938 – 6 May 2021) was an Indian Urdu critic, dramatist and a proponent of modernist movement in Urdu literature. His books on modernism include The Philosophical Foundation of Modernism and New Poetic Tradition. He was associated with the Jamia Millia Islamia to the extent of becoming a professor emeritus.

Hanafi was an alumnus of the Allahabad University and the Aligarh Muslim University. During his career, he taught at the Aligarh Muslim University and the Jamia Millia Islamia. He wrote dramas such as Mitti Ka Bulāwa and Bāzār Mein Nīnd. He was conferred with the awards like Jnangarima Manad Alankaran award and Ghalib Award for his contributions towards Urdu literature.

== Early life and education ==
Shamim Hanafi was born in Sultanpur on 17 November 1938 to Yāsīn Siddīqi and Begum Zaibunnisa. Hanafi was introduced to Rabindranath Tagore, Fyodor Dostoevsky and Charles Dickens quite early in life by his father, who was a literary enthusiast and an advocate.

Hanafi studied Persian with Maulvi Mugheesuddin and developed an interest in Urdu literature due to his teacher Syed Moinuddin Qadri. He got an MA and a PhD from the Allahabad University in 1962 and 1967 respectively and a D.Litt. from the Aligarh Muslim University in 1976. During his studies at the Allahabad University, he drew close to Firaq Gorakhpuri. He also benefitted from Khaleel-Ur-Rehman Azmi and Syed Ehtesham Hussain.

== Career ==
Hanafi taught at a Devi Ahilya Vishwavidyalaya affiliated college in Indore briefly while he finished his MA. He later taught at the AMU for a span of seven years, and then joined the Urdu department of Jamia Millia Islamia (JMI), and remained connected to the JMI in the capacity of professor emeritus. He was elected as the member of the Aligarh Muslim University (AMU) court in 2010. At the JMI, he served as the dean of the Humanities and Languages faculty, from which he resigned in 2012. He was a patron of Jashn-e-Adab and the Rekhta. He was seen among the top literary critics, playwrights and poets of the Indian subcontinent.

During intermediate studies, Shamim translated Saeed Nafisi's Aākhri Yādgār-i-Nādir Shah into Urdu. He wrote his first play, Ākhri Kush, which was produced by his friend Ameeq Hanfee in 1965. He has been the editor of Jamia, a magazine of Jamia Millia Islamia. He wrote dramas including Mitti Ka Bulāwa, Bāzār Mein Nīnd and Mujhe Ghar Yād Aata Hai. In June 2015, his poetic collection Ākhri Pehar ki Dastak was released by Hindi poet Ashok Vajpeyi. In 2012, Hanafi remarked at the Urdu Conference, organized by the Karachi Arts Council that, "books respect our solitude" and "the advent of information technology had sparked off a tussle between books and machines". He compiled Jamia Millia Islamia Tahrīk, Tārīk̲h̲, Riwāyat.

Hanafi was conferred with the first Jnangarima Manad Alankaran award, by the Bharatiya Jnanpith in 2015. He received the "International award for promotion of Urdu literature" in January 2021 from the Majlis-e-Frogh-e-Urdu Adab, a Qatar-based literary organization. He has also received the "Maulana Abul Kalam Azad Award", "Pervaiz Shahidi Award", "Delhi's Urdu Academy Award" and the "Ghalib Award". On 20 September 2015, he was conferred with the Hindustan Gyan Peeth award.

== Death and legacy ==
Shamim Hanafi died of COVID-19 on 6 May 2021 in New Delhi. Arts Council, Karachi president Ahmad Shah expressed grief on Hanafi's death and said "Shamim will remain alive amongst us due to his literary works." Raza Rumi, S. Irfan Habib and Bilal Tanweer expressed grief on Hanafi's death. He is credited with the international recognition and development of the JMI's Urdu department. His students include Kausar Mazhari.

== Literary works ==
Hanafi's books include:

- Jadīdiyyat kī falsafiyānah asās (The Philosophical Foundation of Modernism)
- Naʼī shiʻrī rivāyat (New Poetic Tradition)
- Tārīk̲h̲, tahzīb aur tak̲h̲līqī tajarbah
- Urdū culture aur taqsīm kī virās̲at
- Khayal ki Musaafat
- Qāri Say Mukālma
- Manṭo ḥaqīqat se afsāne tak
- G̲h̲ālib kī tak̲h̲līqī ḥissīyat
- Āzādī ke baʻd Dihlī men̲ Urdū k̲h̲ākah
- G̲h̲azal kā nayā manz̤ar nāmah
