= David Matthews (academic) =

American academic (1942–2021)

- ڈیوڈ میتھیوز
- Born: 1942
- Died: 5 March 2021
- Education: St John's College, Cambridge
- Known for: British scholar of Urdu literature.

David Matthews (Urdu: ڈیْوِڈ مَیتھِیُوز; 1942 – 5 March 2021) was a British scholar, author, and translator of Urdu literature and translator of Muhammad Iqbal and Mir Anees poetry in English. He taught Urdu language and Urdu literature for over 30 years (1965–99) at the School of Oriental and African Studies, University of London after graduating in Classics at UCL.

== Books ==
Matthews published a number of works relating to Urdu literature, including many translations of significant classical Urdu works. One of his major interests was poetry. His 70 works have appeared in 250 publications in 4 languages and 2091 library holdings.

- The Courtesan of Lucknow
- Umrao Jan Ada
- Urdu Literature
- Complete Urdu Beginner to Intermediate Course
- Essential Urdu Dictionary

== See also ==
- Ralph Russell
- Gopi Chand Narang
