= Rekhti =

Urdu feminist poetry

Rekhti (Urdu: ریختی, Hindi: रेख़्ती; [ˈɾeːxtiː]; Rextī), is a form of Urdu feminist poetry. A genre developed by male poets, it uses women's voices to talk about themselves. It was formed in 19th-century Lucknow, then part of the State of Awadh (now in Uttar Pradesh, India). The poet Saadat Yaar Khan Rangin is credited with its creation. Rekhti has also been practiced by Punjabi Sufi poets, such as Shah Hussain, Bulleh Shah and Waris Shah.

Written generally in ghazal form, it uses women's special idioms, mannerism and accents. Their topics include women-women and women-men affairs and also women's sensual desires and sexual urges.

== History ==
Prior to the 17th century, Persian was the main language of literature and poetry in Northern Hindustan, as well as a local language for many. As a gender-neutral language, the romantic and sexual aspects of its poetry were often ambiguous and open to interpretation. In contrast, Hindustani's emerging predecessor Hindavi/Khariboli/Dehlavi/Kauravi, used as a medium of oral communication in many parts of the Indian subcontinent, distinguished between genders. The nascent ghazal style of poetry was a popular mode of composition in this language. However, in the north, ghazals tended to be an expression of love from a male to a female.

The practice of writing poetry in the woman's voice was pioneered in the Deccan, by Muhammad Quli Qutb Shah, fifth ruler of the Golconda Sultanate. Here, the Khariboli dialect was known as Deccani due to some of its regional quirks. Qutb Shah composed ghazals in Deccani but used its gender-specific nature to write them from the female's perspective, which reversed the roles in the ghazal medium. This role-reversal was popular in the Deccan, employed by poets like Hashmi Bijapuri, Asadullah Wajhi, and Hasan Shauqi. Some examples:

Pīya bāj pyāla pīyā jāé nā;
Pīya bāj ék tīl jīyā jāé nā.

Katé hain pīyā bīn suburī karun;
Kahā jāyé amma kīya jāé nā.

— Muhammad Quli Qutb Shah
Translation:

Tis hard to down a cup of wine without the beloved around;
And sans him every moment is painful, and death bound.

‘Forebear’ they say, when I pine for the beloved;
It’s not as easy to practice as it may sound.

Sajan āwain tō pardé sé nīkal kar bhār baithungī;
Bahanā kar ké, mōtīan ka pirōti hār baithungī.

— Hashmi Bijapuri
Translation:

When my love arrives I shall emerge, and sit out in the open revealing my face;
Claiming to be busy shall I sit, stringing pearls into a necklace.

Sīné sun la sīna ghas ghas, lagāté mun sun mun huns huns,
Kadhī dīl nā katā bus bus, raqībān dékh jalté thé.

— Qadar Bijapuri
Translation:

Snuggling close to your chest with lips blissfully locked together,
The heart never saying enough; rivals envying the sight.

The conquest of the Deccan by Aurangzeb brought the region into the fold of northern literary traditions, which spurred the development of the dialect in Delhi into Rekhta. The process also brought the role-reversal trend to the north, and it was only at this time (early 18th century) that the term Rekhti was coined. Here it was furthered by northern Indian poets.

== In other languages ==
Rekhti, called Riti in Punjabi, has been practiced by Sufi poets of Punjab. For example, the late medieval romance Heer Ranjha, written by Waris Shah, shares all the features on Riti. A major difference between Rekhti (Urdu) and Riti (Punjabi) is that Rekhti is usually written as ghazal while Riti is usually written as doha.

== Famous exponents ==
1. Saadat Yaar Khan 'Rangeen'
2. Meer Yaar Alii 'Jaan Sahib'
3. Mohsin Khan 'Mohsin'
4. Insha Allah Khan 'Insha'
5. Qalandar Bakhsh Jurat
6. Waris Shah

== See also ==
- Urdu poetry
