= Khan Muttaqi Nadeem =

Advocate lawyer, poet and author

Khan Muttaqi Nadeem (Urdu خان مطقی ندیم) (8 March 1940 – 15 August 2006) was born in Kanpur, Uttar Pradesh, India, and was an advocate lawyer, poet and author.

== Education and work ==
Khan Muttaqi Nadeem completed a BA at University of Karachi., and a LLB and LLM at islamia law college, Karachi, Pakistan.

He served the Government of Sindh as Assistant Advocate General and then Additional Advocate General Sindh for many years.

He served as Benazir Bhutto's lawyer in Sindh. Nadeem was appointed as Assistant Advocate General, Sindh in 1989. He was very influential among Ullema and politicians and had presented the Shia community in important cases including the Tribunal of 1984. Nadeem was the Bani-e-Julos of 9th and 10th Muharram which rose from Mehfil-e-Haidri karachi.

== Personal life ==
Nadeem was married to Syeda Waqar Jehan and they have three sons and three daughters. He died in August 2006 and is buried in the Wadi-e-Hussain graveyard in Karachi.
