= Chhannu Lal Dilgeer =

Marsiya poet of Urdu language

- Born: Chunnoo Lal; 1780; Lucknow, Oudh
- Died: 1848 (aged 67–68)
- Other names: Munshi Chunnoo Lal Dilgeer, Ghulam Hussain, Dilgeer Lucknavi, Dilgeer, Tarab
- Occupation: Marsiya Poet
- Years active: 1780 – 1848
- Known for: Marsiya writing
- Notable credit: Ghabraye Gi Zainab (title of his popular 'marsiya')

Chhannu Lal Dilgeer, a marsiya poet of Urdu, was born about 1780 at Lucknow, then under Oudh, in the current Indian state of Uttar Pradesh, and died in 1848.

He used Dilgeer as his pseudonym.

== Early life and family ==
He was born in a Hindu family and was the brother of Raja Jhaulal, the deputy prime minister of Nawab Asaf-Ud-Daula of Lucknow, Mughal Empire.

== Works ==
He converted to Islam and changed his name to Ghulam Hussain. His compositions describe occurrences involving Muhammad and his family. He did not recite his own marsiyas due to a speech impairment.

"Ghabraye Gi Zainab" is a well-known marsiya (a poetry genre in the Indian subcontinent of sad songs for the dead) written by Chhannu Lal Dilgeer that describes the arrival of Zainab, daughter of Muhammad's cousin and son-in-law Ali, after practically all of her male relations had been slain.

According to VibesOfIndia.com website, a major news website in India:

"For Shia Muslims, the tragedy is a personalised account of pain. Every year the Shias mourn martyrdom at Karbala. The moment is etched in the consciousness of the Muslims. Karbala has a significant place in Shia consciousness. It is the path to defend just rights and righteousness one must tread like Imam Hussain, upholding the basic tenets of decency, dignity, mutual respect, kindness and compassion.

During Ghazi-ud Din Haider's reign, Dilgeer was a well-known marsiya poet. Nawab Mohammad Ali Shah rewarded him with 400 rupees for writing a 'masnavi' in favor of Hussainabad. Dilgeer wrote a total of 417 marsiyas during his lifetime.
