= Khaleel-Ur-Rehman Azmi =

Indian writer and Urdu poet (1927–1978)

Khaleel-Ur-Rehman Aazmi
- Born: 9 August 1927; Azamgarh, United Provinces, British India
- Died: 1 June 1978 (aged 50); Aligarh, Uttar Pradesh, India
- Education: Aligarh Muslim University
- Occupation: Poet

Khaleel-Ur-Rehman Azmi (9 August 1927 – 1 June 1978), also known as Khalil al-Rehman Azmi, was an Urdu poet and literary critic who was born in the village Seedhan Sultanpur in the district of Azamgarh.

Azmi's father Muhammad Shafi was a deeply religious man. Azmi matriculated from Shibli National High School in Azamgarh in 1945. He gained his bachelor's degree in 1948 and his M.A. in Urdu from Aligarh Muslim University. During this period he tutored the British scholar of Urdu, Ralph Russell. He gained his Doctor of Philosophy in Urdu in 1957 from Aligarh Muslim University for a dissertation entitled: Urdu Mein Tarraqipasand Adabi Tahrik.

In 1952 he became a Lecturer in Aligarh Muslim University's Department of Urdu. Four years later, he became a Reader and continued in that role until his death from leukemia in 1978. He was posthumously elevated to the rank of Professor.

He started writing during his early school days and composed poems for Payami taleem, a children's literary magazine. Proficient in both prose and poetry, he was one of the pioneers of Modernism in Urdu and was also aligned with the Progressive Writers Movement. He received the Ghalib Award for Urdu Poetry in 1978. edited by Shaikh Afzal azmi

== Work and contributions ==
- Kaghzi Pairahan (1953): a collection of poetry, nazms and ghazals.
- Naya Ahad Nama (1965): a collection of poetry, nazms and ghazals.
- Nai Nazm Ka Safar (edited): a collection of Urdu poetry from 1936 to 1972
- Fikr-o-Fan (1956)
- Zawiay-e-Nigah (1966)
- Mazameen-e-Nau (1977): a work of literary criticism
- Muqaddama-e-Kalam-e-Aatish
- Taraqqi Pasand Tahreek (1965)
- Urdu Mein Taraqqi Pasand Adabi Tahreek (1972)
- zindagi ae zindagi ( 1983)
