= Saadat Yaar Khan Rangin =

- Born: Saadat Yaar Khan; Sirhind
- Died: Lucknow
- Occupations: Sepoy, horse-trader, Urdu poet
- Known for: Poetry
- Notable work: Rekhta, Baqiyaa, Aamekhta and Angekhta

Nawab Saadat Yaar Khan Rangin (Urdu: سعادت یار خان رنگِین) (1757, Sirhind – 1835, Lucknow) was an Urdu poet and prose writer. He is credited with the creating a feminist form of Urdu poetry known as "Rekhti".

== Background ==
He was born in Sirhind, brought up Delhi, and died in Lucknow. He was the son of Tahmas Khan Beg, a Persian noble.

== Career ==
He was a disciple of Shah Hatim. The four collections of his poems are – Rekhta, Baqiyaa, Aamekhta and Angekhta in which he is seen as a romantic poet whose choice of words was high. He wrote poems describing his amours with courtesans and dancing girls. He also wrote Majalis e Rangin, a critical review of contemporary Urdu poets. Rangin was a mercenary, a horse-trader and a poet.
