= Dulhipur =

- Census town
- Location in Uttar Pradesh, India Dulhipur (India)
- Coordinates: 25°17′57″N 83°04′51″E
- Country: India
- State: Uttar Pradesh
- District: Chandauli

Population (2001)
  - Total: 7,744

Languages
  - Official: Hindi
- Time zone: UTC+5:30 (IST)
- Vehicle registration: UP
- Website: up.gov.in

Dulhipur is a census town in Chandauli district in the state of Uttar Pradesh, India.

== Demographics ==
As of 2001 India census, Dulhipur had a population of 7,744. Males constitute 51% of the population and females 49%. Dulhipur has an average literacy rate of 34%, lower than the national average of 59.5%: male literacy is 42% and female literacy is 26%. In Dulhipur, 19% of the population was under 6 years of age.

== Illegal Bangladeshi immigrants ==
In November 2018, police arrested several Bangladeshi nationals in 2018–2020 for illegally staying in Dulhipur, seizing fake certificates and voter IDs during the operation. The sweep also included the arrest of a local resident accused of assisting them. Authorities said the detainees had entered India without valid documents. The arrests followed a tip-off and were part of a larger crackdown on undocumented immigrants in Uttar Pradesh.
