= Moulvi Muhammad Baqir =

Indian journalist and religious scholar

First Martyr of Urdu Press Maulvi Muhammed Baqir Dehlavi
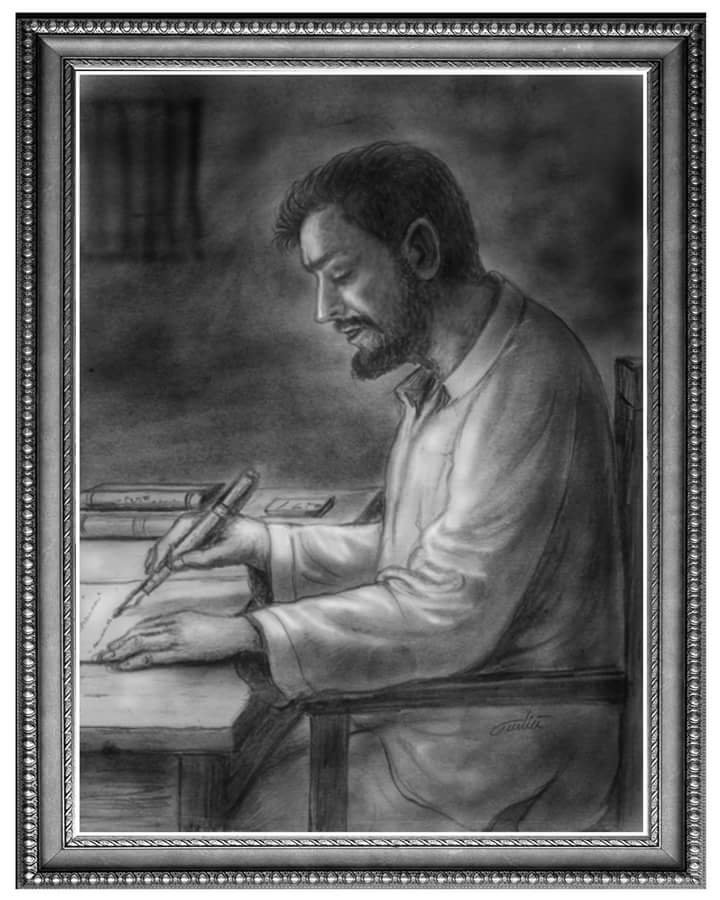

Personal life
- Born: 1780 Delhi, Mughal India
- Died: 1857 (aged 77) Delhi, India
- Website: www.rekhta.org/ebooks/dehli-urdu-akhbar-ebooks

Religious life
- Religion: Shia Islam

Senior posting
- Based in: Delhi, India
- Period in office: 1834–1857
- Successor: Muhammad Hussain Azad (son)

Moulvi Muhammad Baqir (1780–1857) was a scholar, Indian independence activist and journalist based in Delhi. He was the first journalist to be executed following the Indian rebellion of 1857. He was arrested on 16 September 1857 and executed by gunshot two days later without trial. He was the founder and editor of Delhi Urdu Akhbar.

== Early life ==
Baqir was born in 1780 in Delhi. He received his early education from his father. In 1825, he went to Delhi College for further studies. After completing his education, he was appointed as a teacher in Delhi college in 1828, where he served for six years.

== Imambara Azad Manzil ==
In 1843, Maulvi Muhammad Baqir built an Imambara in Delhi near Kashmiri Gate. This was a very inclusive place of gathering where not only Shia Muslims but also Sunnis and Hindus gathered to commemorate the events of Karbala. Great poets like Ibrahim Zauq and Momin Khan Momin also participated in reciting elegies. He also built a mosque near Panja Sharif. In 1834, he also started publishing a religious magazine, Mazhar-e-Haq (مظہر حق), which published news on Shia world and also essays on Shia religious topics.

This was a period of fierce religious debates among Muslims because of the sectarian polemics written by Shah Abd al-Aziz and Shah Ismail Dihlavi. However, Maulvi Baqir forbade any kind of Tabarra in his Imambara. This made a fanatic Shia cleric, Molana Jafar of Jarja, very angry and he wrote to the Marja in Lucknow as for their religious ruling on it, as follows:

"One ABC built an Imambara for commemoration of martyrdom of Imam Hussain but made a proclamation that none was allowed to recite Tabarra against the first three Caliphs who claimed the pulpit after the Prophet. Anyone who recites Tabarra should be expelled."

The Marja in Lucknow replied that the owner was free to define conditions and rules for entry into the house he owns. Those who attend the assembly must follow these rules.

== Dehli Urdu Akhbar ==
In 1834 when the government allowed publication after amending the "Press Act", he entered the field of journalism. In 1835, he started taking out his newspaper under the name of the weekly "Dehli Urdu Akhbar"(دہلی اردو اخبار). The newspaper survived for nearly 21 years, proving to be a milestone in the field of Urdu journalism. With the help of this newspaper, he played an important role in social issues as well as bringing political awakening in public and uniting against foreign rulers.

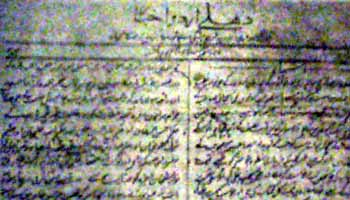
A page of Dehli Urdu Akhbar, the first Urdu newspaper from Delhi.

Maulvi Baqir made full use of his newspaper to generate public opinion against British rule during the Indian Rebellion of 1857. The rebellion against the British was sparked by mutinying sepoys in 1857 and the Mughal Emperor Bahadur Shah Zafar was given the leadership of the revolution by all the rebel leaders. Journalist Maulvi Baqir renamed his newspaper on 12 July 1857 to lend his support " Akhbar Uz Zafar ".

Journalist Maulvi Baqir, a staunch supporter of Hindu Muslim unity on 4 June 1857, printed articles in his newspaper appealing to both communities - "Don't miss this opportunity, if missed, no one will come to help, this is a good opportunity for you to get rid of British rule.

== Death ==
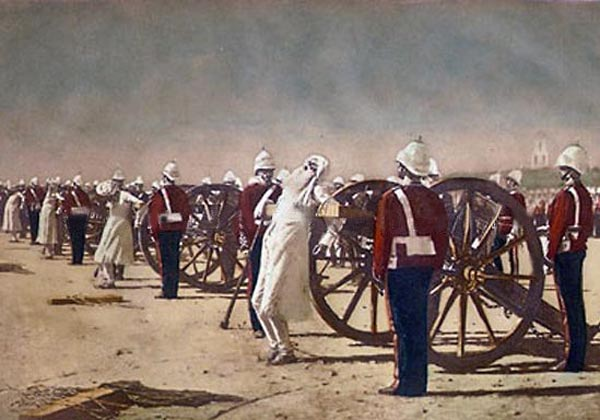
A depiction of British soldiers executing Indians by blowing them from guns

Maulvi Muhammad Baqir was arrested on 14 September 1857 for revolt. On16 September 1857, he was tied to the mouth of a cannon which was then fired by Major William S.R. Hudson. Thus Moulvi Mohammad Baqir became the first martyr for press in the Indian Subcontinent.
