= Najm Afandi =

Urdu poet in India (1893–1975)

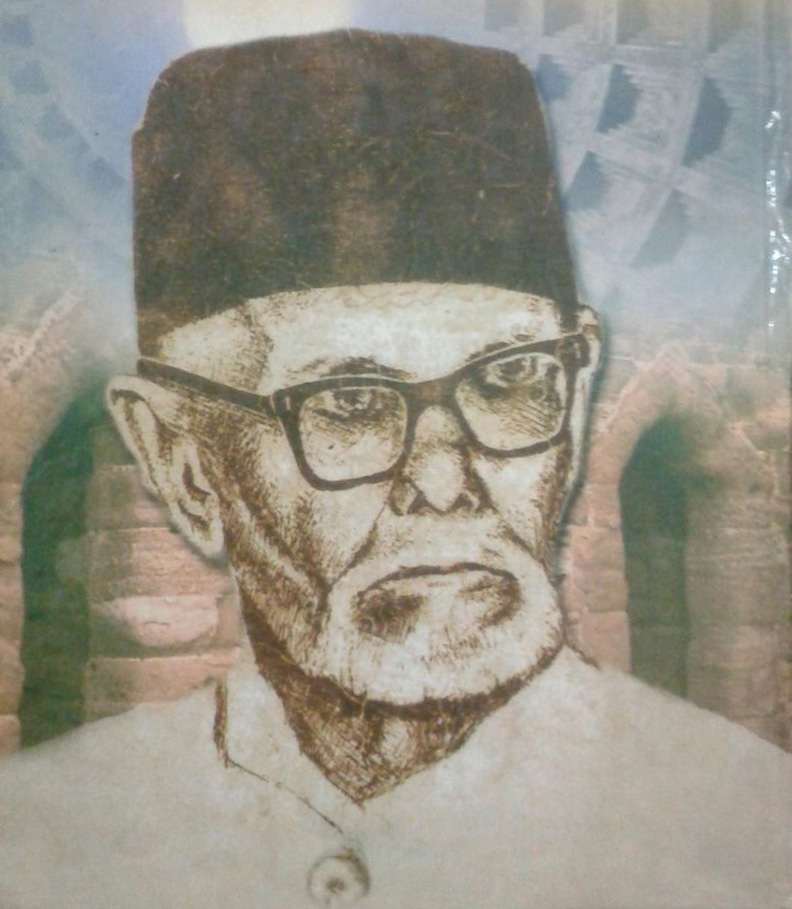
- Najm-Afandi-Portrait

Personal life
- Born: Mirza Tajammul Hussain; 1893 Agra, India
- Died: 1975 (82 years) Karachi, Pakistan
- Resting place: Sakhi Hassan-GraveYard
- Main interest(s): Religious Poetry (Marsiya, Noha)
- Notable work: Noha: 'Aey Waey Nahre Alqama' 'Raaj dulara Zehra ka' Books: Kainat-e-Najm, Khosha e Anjum, Huan Najm, Rubaiyat Najam Afandi
- Occupation: Poet, writer
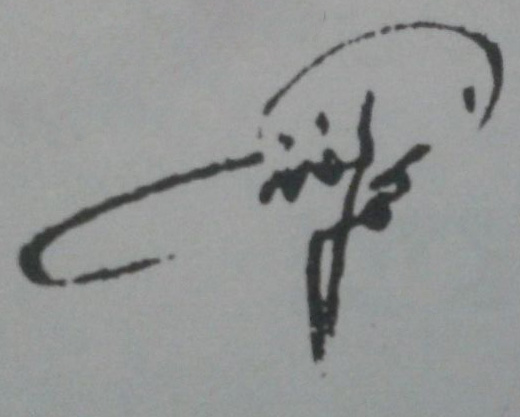
- Signature

Religious life
- Religion: shia Islam

Najm Afandi (1893–1975) نجم آفندی was an Urdu poet in India.

== Life ==
Najm Afandi was born in Agra, India in 1893. His father Bazm Afandi was also a poet. Najm Afandi is renowned for his writings about Ahl e Bayt.
