= Waheed Akhtar =

Urdu poet, writer, critic, orator, and a Muslim scholar and philosopher. 1934–1996

Syed Waheed Akhtar
- Waheed Akhtar
- Title: Syed

Personal life
- Born: 12 August 1934
- Died: 13 December 1996 (aged 62)
- Era: Contemporary
- Region: India
- Main interest: Sufism Islamic philosophy philosophy
- Notable work(s): Paththaron Ka Mughanni, Shab Ka Razmiyah, Zanjeer ka Naghma, Karbala Ta Karbala, Early Imamiyah Shia Thinkers, etc
- Occupation: Urdu poet and Muslim philosopher
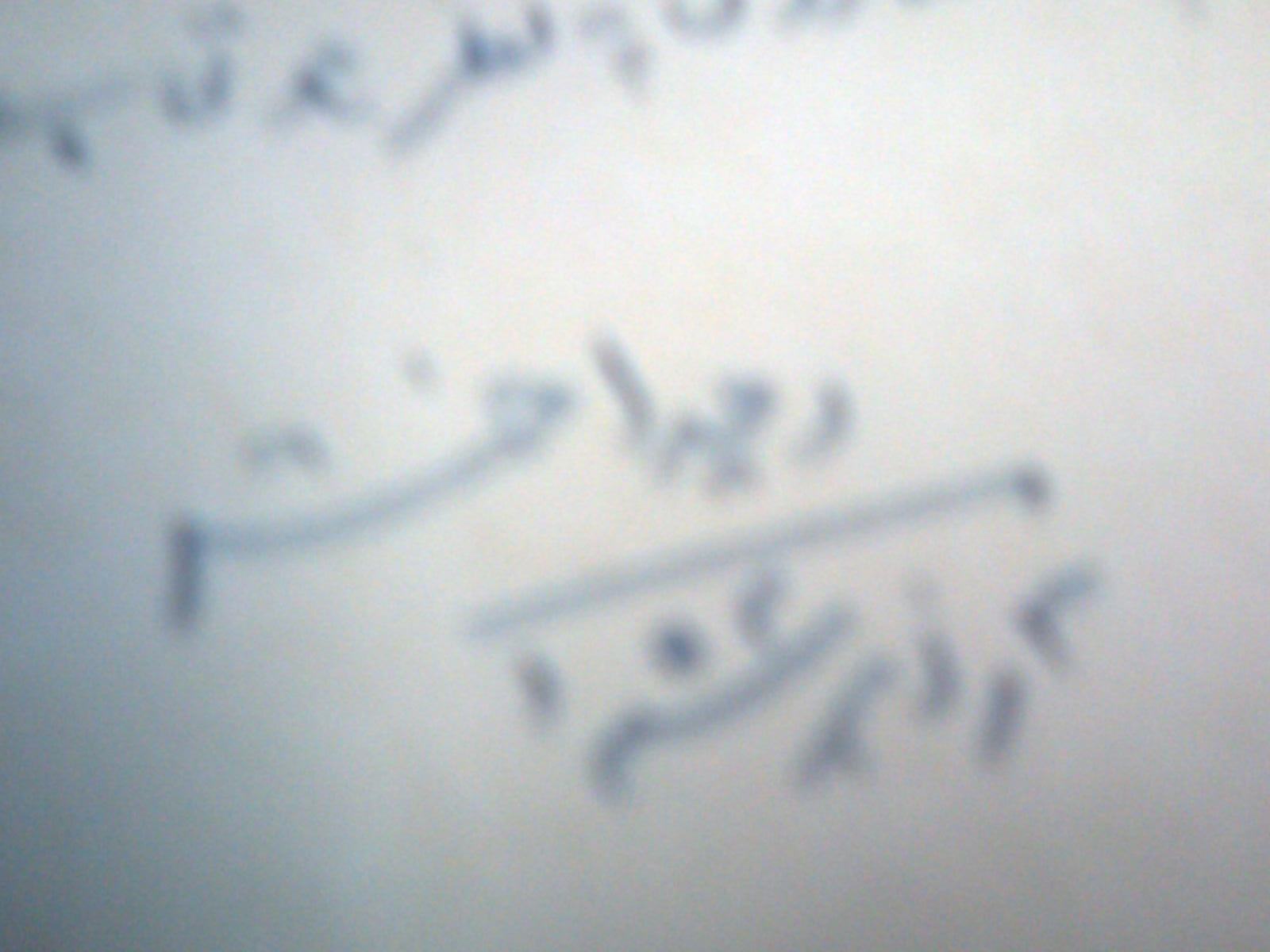
- Signature

Religious life
- Religion: Islam
- Writing career
- Genres: Ghazal Nazm Marsiyah Hijv

Syed Waheed Akhtar (12 August 1934, in Aurangabad (Deccan) – 13 December 1996) was an Urdu poet, writer, critic, orator, and a Muslim scholar and philosopher.

== Works ==
According to Shamsur Rahman Faruqi, "Wahid Akhtar, regarded by many as a Modernist and by many others as Progressive, wrote that Modernism was really an extension of Progressivism". Akhtar is also considered by at least one writer to be among the few successful modern Urdu poets who took Marsia to new heights and gave it new direction in this age.

== See also ==
- Urdu poetry
- Mir Babar Ali Anis
