= Joginder Paul =

Indian author (1925–2016)

- Born: 5 September 1925
- Died: 23 April 2016 (aged 90)
- Occupation: Author

Joginder Paul (5 September 1925 – 23 April 2016) was an Urdu fiction writer associated with the Progressive Writers' Movement. He had written several short stories, novels. His first short story was Before Sacrifice.

== Career ==
Paul was born on 5 September 1925 in Saikot, Pakistan. His career started with Ek Boond Lahoo Ki which got published in Karachi in August 1962. This novel was translated in English by Snehal Shingavi. In 1964, Paul returned to India as a full time writer. He was the Principal of Aurangabad college. He died on 23 April 2016.

== Works ==
=== Novels ===
- Ek Boond Lahoo Ki
- Nadid
- Paar Pare and Khwabro

=== Books ===
- The Dying Sun

=== Short stories ===
- Khula
- Khodu Baba Ka Maqbara
- Bastian

== Awards ==
- SAARC Lifetime Award for his contribution to literature
- Iqbal Samman
- Urdu Academy Award
- All India Bahadur Shah Zafar Award
- The Ghalib Award
