= Marsiya =

Elegiac poem in memory of Hussain ibm Ali

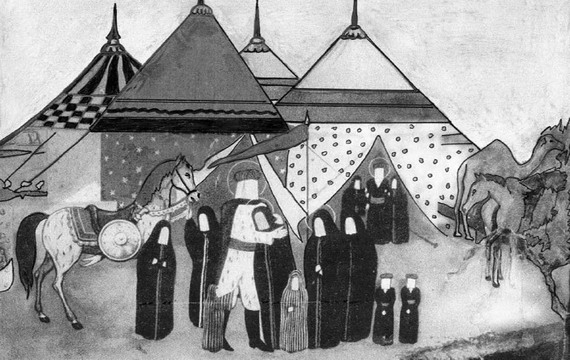
Imam Husayn ibn ‘Alī ibn Abī Tālib bidding farewell to his family before marching to Karbalā

A marsiya (Persian: مَرْثِیَه; Urdu: مرثیہ) or marthiya (Arabic: مَرْثِيَة) is an elegiac poem written by Shia Muslims to commemorate the martyrdom and valour of Hussain ibn Ali, his family, and his companions at the battle of Karbala. Marsiyas are thus essentially religious lamentations.

== Background ==
The Arabic word marthiya is derived from the root r-th-y ('to mourn, to elegize'), meaning a great tragedy or lamentation for a departed soul. Marsiya is a poem written to commemorate the martyrdom of Ahl al-Bayt Imam Hussain at the battle of Karbala. It is usually a poem of mourning.

Marsiyas in Urdu first appeared in the sixteenth century in the Deccan kingdoms of India. They were written either in the two-line unit form, qasida, or the four-line unit form, murabba. Over time, the musaddas became the most suitable form for a marsiya. In this form, the first four lines of each stanza referred to as the band have one rhyme scheme while the remaining two line referred to as the tip have another. Poets who recite marsiyas are called marsiakhawan.

This form found a specially congenial soil in Lucknow, an important Shia Muslim community in the Indian subcontinent, where it was regarded as an act of piety and religious duty to eulogize and bemoan the martyrs of the battle of Karbala. The genre was championed by Mir Babar Ali Anis.

Famous marsiya writers in Urdu include Mir Babar Ali Anis, Mirza Salamat Ali Dabeer, Ali Haider Tabatabai, Najm Afandi, Josh Malihabadi, and others. Well-known Persian poets of the genre include Muhtasham Kashani, Nawab Ahmad Ali Khan Qayamat and Samet Borujerdi. In Turkish, Bâkî composed an important marsiya.

Mir Babar Ali Anis, a renowned Urdu poet, composed salāms, elegies, nohas and quatrains. While the length of elegy initially had no more than forty or fifty stanzas, he pushed it beyond one hundred fifty or even longer than two hundred stanzas or bands, as each unit of marsiya in the musaddas format is known. Mir Anis drew upon the vocabulary of Arabic, Persian, Urdu, Hindi, and Awadhi to a great degree. His poetry has become an essential element of Muharram among the Urdu-speakers of the Indian subcontinent. The first major and still current critical articulation about Mir Anis was Muazna-e-Anis-o-Dabir (1907) written by Shibli Nomani in which he said "the poetic qualities and merits of Anis are not matched by any other poet".

Chhannu Lal Dilgeer (c 1780–c 1848), another marsiya poet, was born during the reign of Nawab Asaf-ud-Daulah, the Nawab wazir of Oudh. He was initially a ghazal poet with the takhallus "Tarab", before focusing on marsiya at a later stage. He converted to Islam and changed his name to Ghulam Hussain. His most popular marsiya is called Ghabraye Gi Zaynab, Ghabraye Gi Zaynab (گھبراۓ گی زینب گھبراۓ گی زینب).

== See also ==
- List of Marsiya writers in Urdu
- Shahr Ashob
- Urdu literature
- Urdu poetry
- Rekhta
- Rithā'
- History of Urdu
- Waheed Akhtar
- Kashmiri Marsiya

== Cited sources ==
- Naim, C. M. (2004). Urdu Texts and Contexts: The Selected Essays of C.M. Naim. Orient Blackswan. ISBN 978-81-7824-075-6.
