= Aab-e hayat (Azad) =

Essay on Urdu poetry by Muhammad Husain Azad in 1880

Aab-e hayat (Urdu: آبِ حیات, English: Elixir of Life) is a commentary (or tazkira) on Urdu poetry written by Muhammad Husain Azad in 1880. The book was described as "canon- forming" and "the most often reprinted, and most widely read, Urdu book of the past century." The book is regarded as the first chronological history of Urdu poetry.

Aab-e hayat became the single most influential source for both anecdotes and historical theories about Urdu poetry. Its second edition in 1883 was incorporated into the official curriculum at Punjab University and several other schools in india and Pakistan

It provides an important perspective on the origin of Urdu:

Although the tree of Urdu grew in the ground of Sanskrit and Bhasha, it has flowered in the breezes of Persian. ...

... there is usually some one place for establishing its genuineness and its goodness or badness, as for coins there is a mint. What is the reason that, in the beginning, Delhi was the mint of the language? The reason is that it was the seat of government. Only at the court were the hereditary nobility and the sons of the élite scholars in their own right. Their gatherings brought together people of learning and accomplishment, and through their auspicious influence made their temperaments the mold of the art and refinement and subtlety and wit of everything. Thus conversation, dress, courtesy and manners, ...
