= Ralph Russell =

- رالف رسل
- Born: 21 May 1918; Hammerton, West Riding of Yorkshire, United Kingdom
- Died: 14 September 2008 (aged 90)
- Education: St John's College, Cambridge; School of Oriental and African Studies (SOAS)
- Known for: British scholar of Urdu literature Communist activist
- Political party: Communist Party of Great Britain (CPGB)
- Awards: Sitara-i-Imtiaz

Ralph Russell SI (Urdu: رَالْف رَسَل) (21 May 1918 – 14 September 2008) was a British scholar of Urdu literature and a Communist.

== Biography ==
Russell was born in Hammerton, West Riding of Yorkshire, England, and grew up in Loughton, Essex. He was educated at Chigwell School, and later at St John's College, Cambridge, where he read classics and geography, graduating in 1940 with an ordinary degree. He learnt Urdu while serving in India on attachment to the Indian Army during World War II, achieving "considerable fluency at the level of everyday communication with my sepoys." During the war he had "no opportunity of making the acquaintance of Urdu literature", but following demobilisation he was awarded a scholarship to study at the School of Oriental and African Studies (SOAS), University of London, where he took a degree in Urdu (with Sanskrit as a subsidiary subject) in 1949.

Upon graduation Russell spent a year on study leave at Aligarh Muslim University in India, before returning to teach Urdu and Urdu literature at SOAS. Although he remained at SOAS for the rest of his career, he continued to lecture and conduct research at universities in both India and Pakistan. He wrote articles and essays in Urdu and English, and attended literary seminars and workshops on the subject of his specialization.

For much of his life Russell was a member of the Communist Party of Great Britain. He later explained his commitment as "want[ing] to meet the needs of the people whom the communist movement is supposed to exist to serve." The historian Eric Hobsbawm, a fellow communist who attended Cambridge at the same time as Russell, remembered him as a "working-class classics student of steely bolshevik demeanour" who had been nicknamed 'Georgi' after the then Secretary of the Comintern, Georgi Dimitrov.

Russell was awarded the Sitara-e-Imtiaz in recognition of his services to Urdu language and literature by the Government of Pakistan. Loughton Town Council installed a blue plaque to Russell at his boyhood home on 6 Queen's Road in that town, which was inaugurated with a reception given by the present owners for family, friends and colleagues on 15 July 2013.

== Books ==
- Three Mughal Poets, 1968
- Ghalib, life and letters, 1969
- New course in Urdu and spoken Hindi for learners in Britain, 1997
- The pursuit of Urdu literature 1992
- Selections from the Persian Ghazals of Ghalib with Translations 1997
- An Anthology of Urdu Literature 1999
- How not to write the history of Urdu literature 1999
- The Famous Ghalib 2000
- The Oxford India Ghalib: Life, Letters and Ghazals 2003
- The Seeing Eye: Selection from the Urdu and Persian Ghazals of Ghalib 2003
- Urdu in Britain (Ed), 1982
- Ghalib: The Poet and his Age (Ed) 1997
- A Thousand Yearnings: a Book of Urdu Poetry and Prose (Trans) 2017

Autobiography

- Findings, keeping: Life, Communism and everything 2001
- Losses, Gains published by Three Essays, New Delhi, 2010

In Urdu

- Urdu Adab ki Justuju (Urdu translation of The Pursuit of Urdu Literature/Curiosity about Urdu literature), by Muhammad Sarwar Rija (2003)
- Juyinda Yabinda (Urdu translation of his autobiography, by Arjumand Ara), City Press, Karachi, 2005

== See also ==
- David Matthews
