= Muhammad Husain Azad =

Indian writer and poet (1830 –1910)

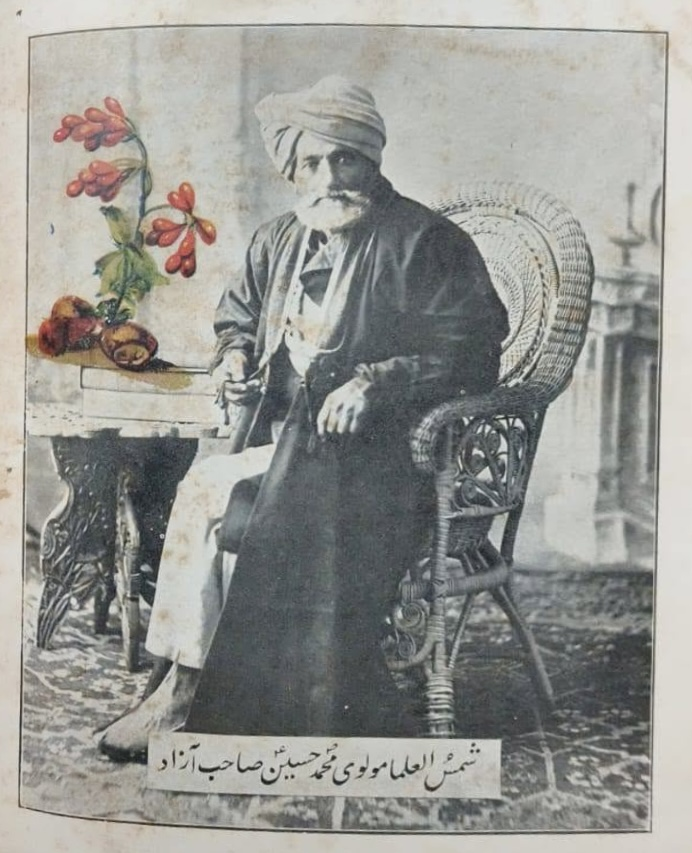
- Photograph of the Urdu writer and scholar Muhammad Husain Azad, published in the Urdu work 'Nigaristan-e-Faras' (Lahore: Matba Kareemi Press, 1922)
- Born: 5 May 1830; Delhi, Mughal Empire (now in India)
- Died: 22 January 1910 (aged 79); Lahore, British India (now in Punjab, Pakistan)
- Notable work: Aab-e-Hayat

Muhammad Husain Azad (Urdu: مُحمّد حُسَین آزاد — Mọḥammad Ḥusẹ̅n Āzād; 5 May 1830 – 22 January 1910) was an Urdu writer and scholar who wrote both prose and poetry, but is mostly remembered for his prose. His best known work is Aab-e-Hayat ("Elixir of Life").

== Early life and family ==
Muhammad Hussain was born in Delhi to a Persian immigrant family. His mother died when he was four years old. His father, Moulvi Muhammad Baqir was educated at the Delhi College. In early 1837, Azad's father bought a printing press and launched the Delhi Urdu Akhbaar (Delhi Urdu Newspaper). In 1854, Muhammad Hussain graduated from college and began to help his father with his newspaper and publishing work.

Azad married Aghai Begum, the daughter of another Persian immigrant family. Then his world came apart during the next few years due to his father-owned newspaper's support of the freedom fighters against the British empire and restoration of the Mughal emperor Bahadur Shah Zafar in Delhi temporarily in the aftermath of Indian Rebellion of 1857. After the British retook Delhi some months later and executed his father Maulvi Muhammad Baqir, his whole joint family including old women and young children were expelled from their house by force by the British authorities. A period of turmoil followed in Delhi, Azad then decided to migrate to Lahore in 1861.

== Career ==
Azad started teaching at the newly-founded Government College, Lahore in 1864, and later at Oriental College, Lahore. In Lahore, he came in contact with G. W. Leitner, who was the Principal of Government College, Lahore and founder of Anjuman-e-Punjab. In 1866, Azad became a regularly paid lecturer on behalf of the Anjuman and a year later became its secretary. In 1887, he established the Azad Library which helped him earn the title of Shams-ul-ulama (Sun among the Learned).

Along with Altaf Hussain Hali, Azad led a movement for 'natural poetry', a movement to reform classical Urdu poetry. He declared the aim of poetry to be “as we express it, it should arouse in the listeners’ heart the same effect, the same emotion, the same fervor, as would be created by seeing the thing itself, rejecting the aesthetics of classical Urdu poetry, which, according to him, was artificial and involved in a 'game of words' that did not produce genuine emotion. Sir Syed Ahmad Khan encouraged and supported both Hali and Azad in their effort to create a simple and realistic-looking creed of Urdu literature.

== Works ==
- Qisas ul-Hind ("Stories of India") - 1869
- Nairang-e Khiyāl ("The Wonder-World of Thought") - 1880
- Aab-e-Hayat ("Water of Life/Elixir") - 1880 (description of the chronological history of Urdu poetry)
- Sair-e-Iran - 1886
- Sukhandān-e Fārs ("On Iranian Poets") - completed in 1887 and published in 1907
- Darbār-e-Akbarī ("The Court of Akbar") - 1898

== Death ==
Muhammad Hussain Azad died in Lahore on 22 January 1910 at age 79.
