= Gopi Chand Narang =

Indian literary critic (1931–2022)

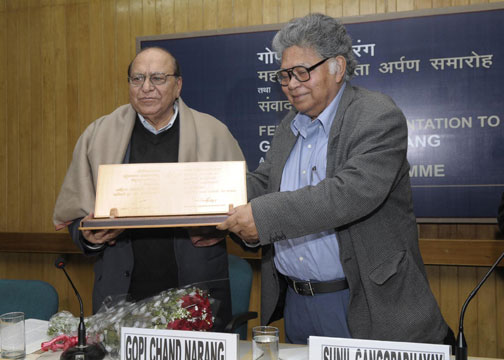
- Narang (left) receiving Sahitya Akademi Fellowship
- Born: 11 February 1931; Dukki, Baluchistan, British India (present day Balochistan, Pakistan)
- Died: 15 June 2022 (aged 91); Charlotte, North Carolina, U.S.
- Education: University of Delhi
- Occupation: Urdu writer
- Children: Arun Narang, Tarun Narang
- Writing career
- Notable awards: Padma Bhushan (2004) Sahitya Akademi Award (1995), Ghalib Award (1985), President of Pakistan Gold Medal (1977), Iqbal Samman (2011), President of Pakistan Sitara-e-Imtiyaz Award (2012), Professor Emeritus, Delhi University (2005–present), Professor Emeritus Jamia Millia Islamia (2013–present), Moorti Devi Award (2012), Sir Syed Excellence National Award (2021)
- Website: www.naranggopichand.com

Gopi Chand Narang (11 February 1931 – 15 June 2022) was an Indian theorist, literary critic, and scholar who wrote in Urdu and English. His Urdu literary criticism incorporated a range of modern theoretical frameworks including stylistics, structuralism, post-structuralism, and Eastern poetics.

== Early life ==
Narang was born in Dukki, a town in Balochistan, British India (now Pakistan). His father Dharam Chand Narang was a litterateur himself, and a scholar of Persian and Sanskrit, who inspired Gopi's interest in literature.

In his Urdu book Urdu Zaban Aur Lisaniyat, Narang states: "Urdu is not my mother tongue. Saraiki was the language spoken in both my paternal and maternal relatives. Even after our migration to Delhi, my mother continued to speak Saraiki, a language renowned for its sweetness, softness, and mellifluous quality."

== Education ==
Narang received a master's degree in Urdu from Dilli College (now Zakir Husain College), University of Delhi, and a research fellowship from the Ministry of Education to complete his PhD in 1958.

About his linguistic journey Narang has said: "My journey with Urdu is a journey of ishq. Urdu was not my mother tongue; my paternal and maternal families spoke Seraiki. But I never realised that Urdu is not my mother tongue".

== Teaching career ==
Narang taught Urdu literature at St. Stephen's College (1957–58) before joining Delhi University, where he became a reader in 1961. In 1963 and 1968 he was a visiting professor at the University of Wisconsin, also teaching at the University of Minnesota and the University of Oslo. Narang joined Jamia Millia Islamia University in New Delhi as a professor in 1974, rejoining the University of Delhi from 1986 to 1995. In 2005, the university named him a professor emeritus.

Narang's first book (Karkhandari Dialect of Delhi Urdu) was published in 1961, a sociolinguistic analysis of a neglected dialect spoken by indigenous workers and artisans in Delhi. He has published over 60 books in Urdu, English, and Hindi.

== Achievements ==
He has produced three studies: Hindustani Qisson se Makhooz Urdu Masnaviyan (1961), Urdu Ghazal aur Hindustani Zehn-o-Tehzeeb (2002) and Hindustan ki Tehreek-e-Azadi aur Urdu Shairi (2003). Narang's related volumes—Amir Khusrow ka Hindavi Kalaam (1987), Saniha-e-Karbala bataur Sheri Isti'ara (1986) and Urdu Zabaan aur Lisaniyaat (2006)—are socio-cultural and historical studies.

In addition to teaching, Narang was vice-chairman of the Delhi Urdu Academy (1996–1999) and the National Council for Promotion of Urdu Language – HRD (1998–2004) and vice-president (1998–2002) and president (2003–2007) of the Sahitya Akademi.

== Honours ==
Narang was an Indira Gandhi Memorial Fellow of the Indira Gandhi National Centre for the Arts from 2002 to 2004, and a 1997 resident of the Rockefeller Foundation Bellagio Center in Italy. Narang received the Mazzini Gold Medal (Italy, 2005), the Amir Khusrow Award (Chicago, 1987), a Canadian Academy of Urdu Language and Literature Award (Toronto, 1987), an Association of Asian Studies (Mid-Atlantic Region) Award (US, 1982), a European Urdu Writers Society Award (London, 2005), an Urdu Markaz International Award (Los Angeles, 1995) and an Alami Farogh-e-Urdu Adab Award (Doha, 1998). He is the only Urdu writer honoured by the presidents of both India and Pakistan. In 1977 Narang received the President's National Gold Medal from Pakistan for his work on Allama Iqbal, and received a Padma Bhushan (2004) and Padma Shri (1990) from India. He received honorary Doctor of Letters degrees from Aligarh Muslim University (2009), Maulana Azad National Urdu University (2008) and the Central University in Hyderabad (2007). Narang received the Sahitya Akademi Award in 1995, the Ghalib Award in 1985, Urdu Academy's Bahadur Shah Zafar Award, Bharatiya Bhasha Parishad Award (both in 2010), Madhya Pradesh Iqbal Samman (2011) and the Bharatiya Jnanpith Moorti Devi Award (2012). The Sahitya Akademi conferred on Narang its highest honour, the Fellowship, in 2009.

== Plagiarism and controversies ==
There have been allegations of plagiarism against Gopi Chand Narang for copying and translating from secondary sources major portions of his Sahitya Akademi award-winning book Sakhtiyat, Pas-Sakhtiyat aur Mashriqui Sheriyat (Structuralism, Post-Structuralism and Eastern Poetics). There have also been allegations of corruption and controversial appointments under his presidency of Sahitya Akademi, which he headed from 2003 to 2007. He has denied these allegations of corruption.

However, the said malicious charges have been refuted in a recent article 'How author and critic Gopi Chand Narang survived a maligning campaign'. The author has clearly stated that Gopi Chand Narang was targeted for his criticism of unrealistic Modernism in Urdu. It was mere propaganda against him that cannot stand the literary scrutiny or any serious debate, those who tried to malign him had no understanding of his work or literary motifs.

== Bibliography ==
Narang has published more than 60 scholarly and critical books on language, literature, poetics and cultural studies; many have been translated into other Indian languages.

=== Urdu ===
- Hindustani Qisson Se Makhuz Urdu Masnawiyan (1961)
- Imlaa Naama (1974)
- Puraanon ki Kahaaniyan (1976)
- Anis Shanaasi (1981)
- Safar Aashna (1982)
- Iqbal Ka Fann (ed. 1983)
- Usloobiyat- e-Mir (1985)
- Urdu Afsana, Riwayat Aur Masail (ed. 1986)
- Saniha-e-Karbala Bataur Sheri Isti’ara (1986)
- Amir Khusrau Ka Hindavi Kalaam (1987)
- Adbi Tanqeed Aur Usloobiyat (1989)
- Qari Asaas Tanqeed (1992)
- Sakhtiyat, Pas-Sakhtiyat aur Mashriqui Sheriyat (1993)
- Urdu Ghazal aur Hindustani Zehn-o Tahzeeb (2002)
- Hindustan ki Tehreek-e-Azadi aur Urdu Shairi (2003)
- Taraqqi Pasandi, Jadidiat, Maba’d-e-Jadidiat (2004)
- Aniis aur Dabiir (2005)
- Jadidiat ke baad (2005)
- Urdu ki Nayii Bastiyaan (2006)
- Urdu Zaban aur Lisaniyat (2006)
- Sajjad Zahiir: Adabi Khidmaat aur Taraqqi Pasand Tehriik (2007)
- Firaq Gorakhpuri: Shayar, Naqqad, Daanishvar (2008)
- Dekhna Taqreer ki Lazzat (2009)
- Fiction Sheriyat (2009)
- Khwaja Ahmad Faruqi ke Khutuut Gopi Chand Narang ke Naam (2010)
- Kaghaz-e Atish Zadah (2011)
- Tapish Nama-e Tamanna (2012)
- Aaj ki Kahaniyan (2013)
- Ghalib : Ma'ni-Afrini, Jadliyaati Waza', Shunyata aur Sheriyaat (Ghalib : Meaning, Mind, Dialectical Thought & Poetics) (2013)
- Kulliyaat-e Hindavi Amir Khusrau: Ma’e Tashriih o Tajziya Nuskha-e Berlin. (2017)
- Mashaher ke Khutoot Gopi Chand Narang Ke Naam. Vol I, Vol II, Vol III, Vol IV (2017)
- Imlaa Naama Pakistani Edition. (2021)

=== English ===
- Karkhandari Dialect of Delhi Urdu (1961)
- Urdu Language and Literature: Critical Perspectives (1991)
- Readings in Literary Urdu Prose (ed. 1965)
- Rajinder Singh Bedi: Selected Short Stories (ed. 1989)
- Krishan Chander: Selected Short Stories (ed. 1990)
- Balwant Singh: Selected Short Stories (ed. 1996)
- Ghalib: Innovative Meaning and the Ingenious Mind. (trans. by Surinder Deol) (2017)
- Faiz Ahmed Faiz: Thought Structure, Evolutionary Love and Aesthetic Sensibility (2019)
- The Urdu Ghazal: A Gift of India's Composite Culture. (trans. by Surinder Deol) (2020)
- The Hidden Garden: Mir Taqi Mir (trans. by Surinder Deol) (2021)

=== Hindi ===
- Amir Khusro ka Hindavi Kalam (1987)
- Pathakvadi Aalochana (1999)
- Urdu Par Khulta Dareecha (2004)
- Biswin Shatabdi mein Urdu Sahitya (2005)
- Samrachnavad, Uttar-Samrachnavad evam Prachya Kavyashastra (2000)
- Urdu Kaise Likhen (2001)
- Urdu Ghazal evam Bharatiya Manas V Sanskriti (2016)
- Bhartiya Lok Kathaon par Aadharit Urdu Masanaviyan (2016)
- Ghalib: Arthvatta, Rachnatamakta evam Shunyata (2020)
- Amir Khusrau: Hindvi Lok Kavya Sankalan ( 2021)

== Books on Gopi Chand Narang ==
- Dr. Mohd. Hamid Ali Khan. 1995. Gopi Chand Narang: Hayaat o Khidmaat. Delhi: Educational Publishing House.
- Manaazir Ashiq Harganvi. 1995. Gopi Chand Narang aur Adabi Nazariya Saazi. New Delhi: Adab Publications.
- Abdul Haq, ed. 1996. Armughaan-e Narang. New Delhi: Modern Publishing House. [Selected papers in honour of Prof. Gopi Chand Narang on the eve of his superannuation from the University of Delhi.]
- Shahzad Anjum, ed. 2003. Diidavar Naqqaad Gopi Chand Narang, edited by Shahzåd Anjum. Delhi: Education Publishing House.
- Abdul Mannaan Tarzi. 2003. Narang Zaar: Professor Narang ki Hayaat aur Adabi Khidmaat ka Manzoom Tanqiidi Jaiza. New Delhi: Maktaba Iste’aara.
- Fe. Seen. Ejaz, ed. 2004. Gopi Chand Narang (Regular Book Edition). Kolkatta: Insha Publications.
- Saifi Sironji. 2006. Gopi Chand Narang aur Urdu Tanqiid. Sironj: Intisaab Publications.
- Nand Kishore Vikram. 2008. Bain ul-Aqwaami Urdu Shakhsiiyat: Gopi Chand Narang. Delhi: Publishers & Advertisers.
- Maula Bhaksh. 2009. Jadiid Adabi Theory aur Gopi Chand Narang. Delhi: Educational Publishing House.
- Mushtaq Sadaf. 2010. Dekhna Taqriir ki Lazzat: Gopi Chand Narang ke Adabi Interviews. Bangalore: Karnatak Urdu Akademi.
- Sharyar, Abul Kalam Qasmi, edts. 2011. Gopi Chand Narang: Shakhsiyat aur Adabi Khidmaat. New Delhi: Maktaba Jamia Ltd.
- Saifi Sironji. 2012. Maaba’ad-e Jadiidiyat aur Gopi Chand Narang. Sironj: Intisaab Publications.
- Manaazir Ashiq Hargaanvi. 2013. Tanqiid ka Naya Manzar Naama aur Gopi Chand Narang. Delhi: Arshiya Publications.
- Mehboob Rahi, Nazeer Fatehpuri, edts. 2013. Gopi Chand Narang ek Hama Jihat Shakshiyat. New Delhi: M.R. Publication
- Mushtaq Sadaf, ed. 2014. Adabi Theory, Sheiri’yaat aur Gopi Chand Narang. Delhi: Educational Publishing House.
- Danish Allahbadi, ed. 2014. Gopi Chand Narang aur Ghalib Shanaasi. Delhi: Educational Publishing House.
- Jameel Akhtar. 2015. Zindagi Nama: Gopi Chand Narang. Delhi: Educational Publishing House.
- Athar Nabi, ed. 2016. Hasht Pahlu Naqqaad Gopi Chand Narang. Delhi: Arshiya Publications.
- Shahnaaz Qaadiri. 2019. Prof. Gopi Chand Narang ki Tanqiid Nigaari. Delhi: M.R. Publications.
- Najmunnisa Naz. 2017. Gopi Chand Narang ki Dakani Khidmaat. Delhi: Darul Ishaat Mustufai, Delhi.
- Shahida Usaid Rizvi. 2021. Baaten Hamari Yaad Rahein. Delhi: Arshiya Publications.
- Zafar Sironji. 2022. Sadi ki Aankh Gopi Chand Narang. Sironj: Intisaab Publications.
- Omer Farhat. 2022. Gopi Chand Narang Pakistani Adeebon ki Nazar mein. Pakistan: Kitabi Duniya.
- Idris Ahmed. 2022. Prof. Gopi Chand Narang Adeeb-o-Daanishwar. New Delhi: Ghalib Institute.

== See also ==
- List of Indian writers
- Ralph Russell
- David Matthews (academic)
