= Sibt-e-Jaafar Zaidi =

Pakistani poet and religious reciter (1957–2013)

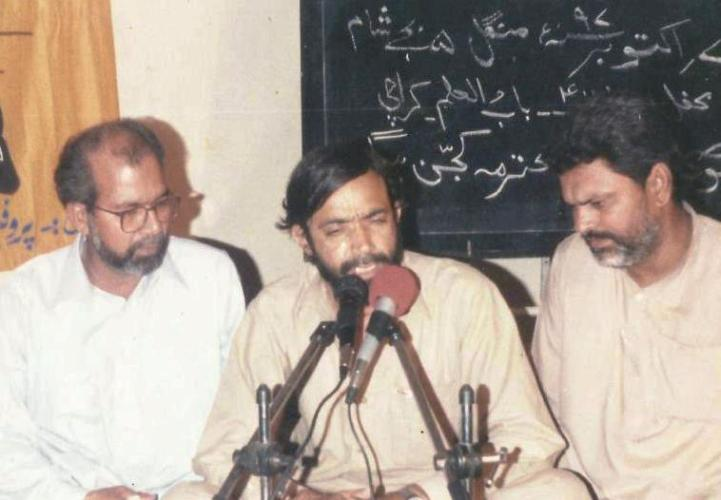
- Sibt-e-Jaafar (middle) addressing a majlis
- Born: 7 March 1957; Karachi, Pakistan
- Died: 18 March 2013 (aged 56); Karachi, Pakistan
- Cause of death: Gunshot wound
- Resting place: Wadi-e-Hussain, Karachi
- Other name: Ustad Sibt-e-Jaafar
- Occupations: Professor; poet; religious reciter; writer

Syed Sibt-e-Jaafar Zaidi (Urdu: سيد سبط جعفر زيدى; 7 March 1957 – 18 March 2013) or commonly known as Ustad Sibt-e-Jaffar was a Pakistani professor, poet, advocate, religious reciter, writer and social worker.

== Early life and education ==
Sibt‑e‑Jaafar Zaidi was born on 7 March 1957 in Karachi, Sindh, Pakistan. He received his early education from a government school in Liaquatabad before pursuing higher studies in arts and social sciences.

== Career ==
Besides his role as a college principal and professor, Sibt‑e‑Jaafar Zaidi was reportedly qualified for civil service examinations, including the CSS (Central Superior Services)—a competitive professional qualification in Pakistan—although he chose to dedicate his life to education and community work.

He started seven colleges in interior Sindh, each costing around Rs 6 million. He had set up educational centers. Apart from looking after educational wings of around five welfare organizations, he oversaw numerous charity organizations and orphanages. He received an Honorary award from Harvard University. He ran a school in Tando Adam where Muslim and Hindus studied for free. He was a poet, an intellectual, a principal in a college. He was shot down when he was returning from his college on his bike.

Born and raised in Shia Muslim family, Sibte Jaffer got the early attachment with Ahl al-Bayt. Sibte Jaffer chose to write poetry for Ahl al-Bayt, through this Zaidi started getting momentum among masses, he used to recite Eulogies which was written by himself in different Majalis organized by different people at different locations mostly in Karachi, Pakistan. His skilled poetry and unique recitation style gave him the Title of "Sha'ir-e-Ahle Bait" (Poet of Ahle Bait).

He is also the paternal grandson of Nasim Amrohvi and childhood bestfriend of Rehan Azmi

== Social work ==
Sayyid Sibte Jaffar Zaidi was involved in establishing welfare and educational initiatives. In 2009, he helped found the JDC Foundation Pakistan, a non‑governmental organization focused on emergency services, healthcare, and educational support in Pakistan.

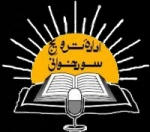
Shaheed Ustad Sibt I Jaafar is Founder of Idara-e-Tarveej-e-Soazkhwani.

== Literary Works and Publications ==
Sayyid Sibte Jaffar Zaidi authored and compiled several academic and religious books, including educational texts for Pakistan Studies and Sociology at intermediate and degree levels, as well as collections of religious poetry. Works attributed to him include:

- Pakistan Studies for Intermediate
- Sociology for Bachelors or Degree Classes
- Zaad‑e‑Raah – Guide for Pilgrims
- Muntakhabaat‑e‑Nazm‑o‑Nasr – Collection of religious poetry
- Bastah (Manqabat, Soz, Salam, Marsia)

== Manqabats ==
- Abu Turab Aaty Hain
- Zahoor Ka Waqat Aa Gaya Ha
- Jab Imam Ayenge
- Jab Khuda Ko Pukara Ali Aa Gae
- Ashaab They Kya Buzar O Salman Wagaira
- Gar Ali Nahi Aatay Zindagi Nahi Aati

== Death ==
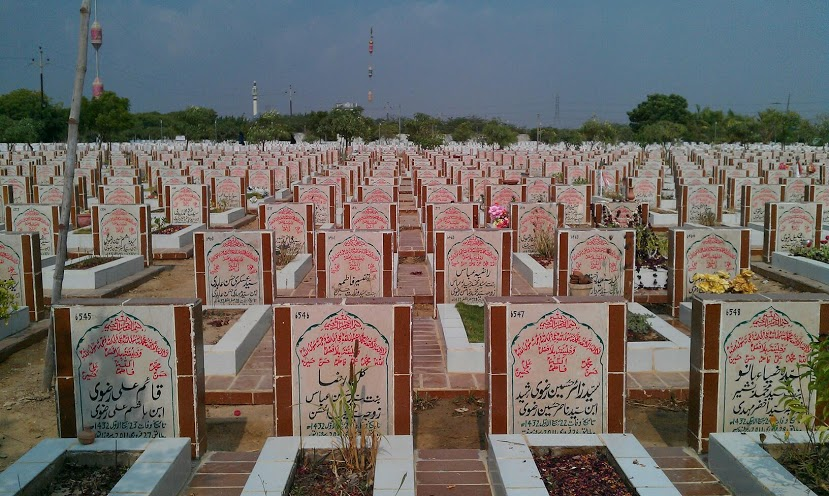
Sibt-e-jaafar's grave is present in Wadi-e-Hussain Cemetery

Sibt e Jaafar was shot and killed by two people on a motorcycle in Liaquatabad, Karachi on 18 March 2013. On 4 April 2013, two suspects were arrested in Karachi.
