= Mir Anees =

Indian Urdu poet (1800–1874)

Khuda-e-Sukhan Mir Anees
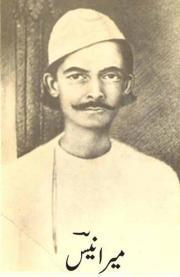
- Anees in Lucknow probably in the early 1850s
- Born: 1800; Faizabad, Oudh State, Mughal India
- Died: 10 December 1874 (aged 74); Lucknow, North-Western Provinces, British India
- Occupation: Urdu poet
- Relatives: Mir Khaleeq (father)
- Writing career
- Pen name: Anees (انیس)
- Period: Mughal era
- Genres: Marsiya, Rubai
- Subject: Battle of Karbala
- Website: miranees.com

Mir Babar Ali Anees (Urdu: مير ببر على انيس; 1800–1874), also known as Mir Anees, was an Indian Urdu poet. He used his pen-name (takhallus) of Anees (انيس, meaning "close friend, companion") in poetry. Anees used Persian, Urdu, Arabic, and Sanskrit words in his poetry. Anees wrote prolonged Marsias, which was a custom of his times, but nowadays only selected sections are narrated even in religious ceremonies. He died in 1291 Hijra, corresponding with 1874 CE.

== Family ==
Mir Babar Ali Anis was born in 1803 CE at Faizabad. In his book Khandaan- e-Mir Anees ke Naamwar Sho’ara (Famous Poets from the family of Mir Anis), Zameer Naqvi lists 22 poets from Mir Anis’ family and their poetry. A researcher in Urdu Literature, Syed Taqi Abedi, has shown that Mir Anis's family has written poetic literature for three centuries, first in Persian and later in Urdu. Mir Anis was a fifth-generation poet, a fact he mentioned in the first stanza of "Namak-e-Khwaan-e-Takallum hai Fasaahat meri":

Namak-e-Khwaan-e-Takallum hai Fasaahat meri
Naatqein band hai’n sun sun ke balaaghat meri
Rang udte hain wo rangee’n hai ibarat meri
Shor jiska hai wo darya hai tabeeyat meri
Umr guzri hai isi dasht ki sa’iyaahi mei’n
Paanchvi pusht hai Shabbir ki maddaahi mei’n

Translation:

My eloquence is the salt of the food of thought
The eloquents are mute when my style they hear
Fly colours when the colour of my ink I jot
The sound of the seas are my ideas clear
Hunting in this forest (for words) spent life I mine
Praising Hussain, fifth in progeny line

== Education ==
Anis's mother appears to have been his greatest inspiration. He gained a traditional Shia education. However, research by Nayyar Masood reveals that, while in Faizabad, Anis studied with two religious scholars; one was a Shia Scholar, Mir Najaf and the other was a Hanafi (Sunni) Scholar, Haider Ali Faizabadi. Masood also notes that Anis was well versed in Persian as well as in Arabic. Anis also had military training and gained a thorough knowledge of old and new weapons.

== Life ==
Anis was invited to Lucknow where he reached the zenith of his reputation. He stayed in Lucknow because he believed that his art was not appreciated elsewhere. Yet, after the annexation of Oudh by the British, he was persuaded to visit Azimabad (Patna), Dulhipur (Varanasi), Hyderabad and Allahabad.

In 1870 Nawab Tahwar Jung invited Anis to Hyderabad where he declined to be presented at the court of Mir Mahboob Ali Khan, the then Nizam of Hyderabad State. The Nizam himself went to the Majlis where the poet was to recite. While returning from Hyderabad, he sojourned at Allahabad in 1871 and recited his marsia in the Imambara of late Lala Beni Prasad Srivastava, Vakil, who was a devotee of Imam Husain.

Mir Anees in Hyderabad in 1871
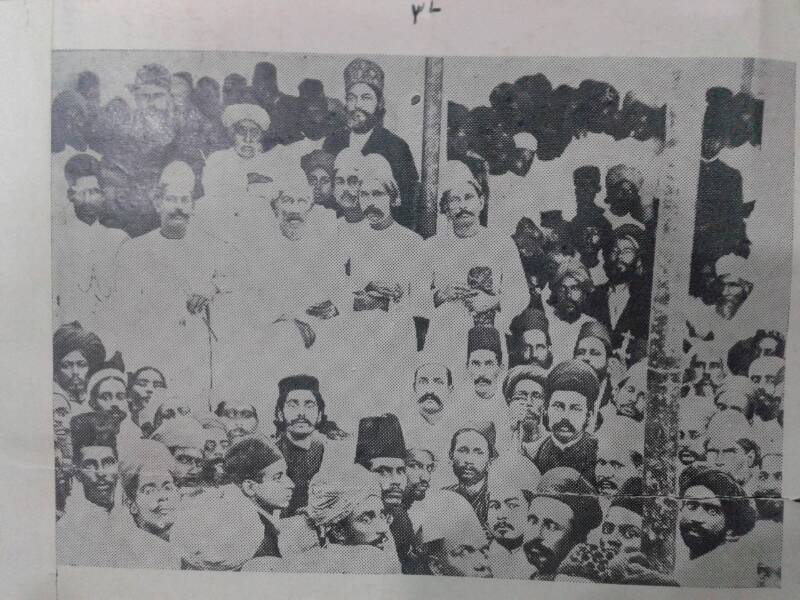
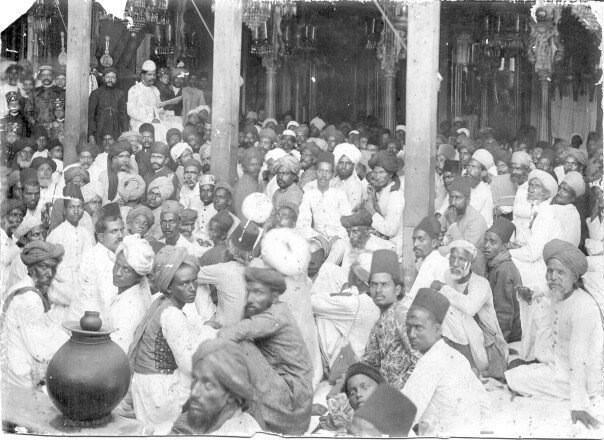

He died in 1874 CE and is buried at his own residence in Lucknow.

== Work and contribution ==
According to Muhammad Hussain Azad, "The late Mīr Sahib must certainly have composed at least ten thousand elegies, and salāms beyond count. He composed as easily and casually as he spoke."

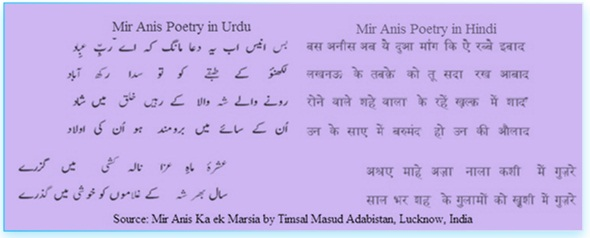
Portion of stanzas from Timsal Masud Presentation of Mir Anis Ka ek Marsia (one Marsia by Mir Anis), in Urdu and Hindi Language writing styles

In his essay "How to read Iqbal?" Shamsur Rahman Faruqi wrote: "Iqbal was placed better because he had, among others, Bedil (1644–1720) in Persian and Mir Anis (1802–1874) in Urdu." He further asserts: "The mention of Mir Anis may surprise some of us until we realize it that Mir Anis’s Marsiyas are the best premodern model in Urdu of narrative-historical, narrative-lyrical, and oral-dramatic poetry, and Iqbal’s poetry extends and exploits the possibilities created by Anis."

Mir Anis was criticized for playing on religious sentiments giving his work a vertical appeal at the expense of poetic beauty. While Farhat Nadir Rizvi, in her research, has propounded that Anis was narrating recorded history and was therefore restricted in use of pure imagination and fantasy, yet he dexterously harnessed the art of storytelling in his work and we cannot but accept that he was not only a Marsiya writer but also a successful storyteller. Anis has been compared with Shakespeare. Shakespeare creates imaginary plots and characters so beautifully that they appear real to the reader; Anis narrates events and characters fossilized in history so vividly that they become alive in the eyes of his audience.

Anis is also known as a pioneer in Rubai, an Urdu poetry branch, and enjoys status akin to that of Mirza Sauda, Khwaja Mir Dard and Dabeer.

== Books on Mir Anis ==
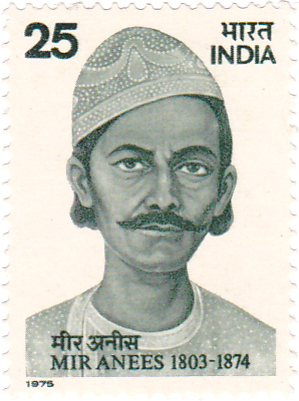
Anees on a 1975 stamp of India

- Marsiya Khawani Ka Funn and Marka-i-Anis-au-Dabir (Urdu) by Nayyar Masood
- Urdu Marsiye K a Safar
- Tajzia-i-Yadgar Marsia, Research and compilation by Taqi Abedi
- Intikhab-e-Kalam Compiled by Muhammad Reza Kazimi
- Rubaiyate-e-Anis Compiled By Mr. Mohammad Hasan Bilgrami and Anis Shakhsiyat Aur Fun by Mr. Fazl-e-Imam published by UP Urdu Akademi, India.
- Books by Syed Zameer Akhtar Naqvi Mir Anees Ki Shairi (in Urdu Language) & The poets in the family of Mir Anis (published in 1996) 2nd Book is about the life history of 22 family members of Mir Anis that were poets and their poetry.
- The immortal poetry & Mir Anis (English) by Syed Ghulam Abbas. Published in 1983 by Majlis-e-Milli, Pakistan in Karachi
- The battle of Karbala 90 pages (Urdu) Translated by David Matthew (ISBN 9788171672134) Original from the University of California Digitized 27 February 2008 Publisher of 2nd Edition: Rupa & Co., 1994
- Mir Anis Aur Qissa Goi Ka Fan 498 pages: By Farhat Nadir Rizvi (ISBN 1977566804)
- Turki ba Turki (ترکی بہ ترکی ), a rejoinder to Kaleemuddin Ahmed and other critics on Mir Anis - By Dr. Syed Qasim Mahdi, pen-name Shaoor Azmi.
- Anis ki Marsiya Nigari by Khan Bahadur Mirza Jafar Ali Khan Asar Lakhnawi written in refutation to the article by Mohammad Ahsan Farooqi.

== See also ==
- Mirza Dabeer
- Ustad Sibte Jaafar Zaidi
- Mohsin Naqvi
- Marsiya
- Azadari
- Ashura
- David Matthews (academic)
