= Lutfullah Khan =

Pakistani archivist

Lutfullah Khan لطف الله خان
- Born: 25 November 1916; Madras (British India)
- Died: 3 March 2012 (aged 95); Karachi, Pakistan
- Occupations: archivist, writer
- Known for: Archivist known for his Voice Collection Archives
- Awards: Pride of Performance Award by the President of Pakistan in 2012

Lutfullah Khan (Urdu لطف الله خان) (25 November 1916 – 3 March 2012) was a collector, archivist, hobbyist and an author from Pakistan. He was best known for his rare collection of voice recordings of renowned artists, poets, writers and other eminent individuals from Pakistan and South Asia.

== Early life ==
Lutfullah Khan was born in Madras (now Chennai) in British India on 25 November 1916. His father worked for the South Indian Railway Company. Lutfullah gained his basic education in Madras but moved to Hyderabad in search of work when he was still a teenager. In 1938, he moved to Bombay to work for the rationing department in British India. He migrated to Pakistan on 17 October 1947, after the independence of Pakistan, and settled in Karachi where he joined the advertising business and remained in this profession for more than 50 years.

== Music career ==
Lutfullah Khan was passionate about music and singing from his childhood. He signed an agreement in 1933 for classical singing with the Indian Broadcasting Service. In 1935, at the age of 19, he performed publicly in a two-hour radio concert in Madras and played Karnatic music. Known as Madras Radio Artist, he sang Ghazals at a function of Muslim Students Association of St. Xaviers College in January 1939 and rendered classical singing in Bombay in December the same year. Between 1963 and 1988, he practised singing with Abdul Shakoor Khan of Kirana gharana, and explored the intricacies of only one raag, the Darbari.

== Voice collection ==
Luftullah was known for his unique collection of voice recordings. In 1951, when he started his advertising agency, one of his clients imported a Sound Mirror audio tape recorder. Lutfullhah bought the machine and 22 tapes for Pakistani rupee 1,146 and 10 annas (the machine and the receipt forms a part of his collection). He performed his first sound recording, which was the voice of his mother, on 29 July 1951. Later, he started recording radio programs for drama, music, poetry, prose, fine arts, religion and education. He went on collecting voices of notable personalities, especially speeches of political leaders and politicians, and narrations of authors' own works. He maintained a minutely detailed catalogue for all the tapes on different subjects.

In its obituary, Dawn newspaper remarked, "It was a testimony to his zeal for the arts that artists and men of letters loved to visit his studio for recording sessions."

=== Music archives ===
In music, his collection is organised into many subcategories:

- Instrumental Music that includes Sarod (notably Hafiz Ali Khan and Ali Akbar Khan), Sitar (notably Enayat Khan, Vilayat Khan, Ravi Shankar and Sharif Khan Poonchwaley), Shehnai (notably Bismillah Khan), Flute (notably Pannalal Ghosh), Tabla (notably Ahmed Jan Thirakwa, Alla Rakha) and Sarangi (notably Bundu Khan)
- Classical Music that includes notably Bade Ghulam Ali Khan, Fayyaz Hussain Khan, Moizuddin Khan, Chand Khan, Zakir Brothers.
- Semi-classical music that includes Thumri, Pahari, Dadra, Kafi, Bhajan etc.
- Ghazals including notably Begum Akhtar, Sehgal, Shamshad Begum, Rauf Dakkani, Mukhtar Begum, Mushtri Bai, Salamat Ali Khan, Amanat Ali Khan, and Roshan Ara Begum. It also includes 318 ghazals of Mehdi Hassan.
- Folk music
- Qawali music
- songs from other genres

=== Literary archives ===
The Urdu literature section is divided into poetry and prose. Poetry contains the work of 800 poets. Faiz Ahmad Faiz and Akhtar ul Iman recorded their entire work for his library. Some of the other names are Jagan Nath Azad, Sufi Ghulam Mustafa Tabassum, Parveen Shakir, Josh Malihabadi, Jigar Moradabadi, Khatir Ghaznavi, Ali Sardar Jafri, Kaifi Azmi, Ahmad Faraz, Ismat Chughtai, Noon Meem Rashid, Z.A. Bukhari and others. Prose contains such items as Ale Ahmad Suroor, Ibrahim Jalees, Patras Bokhari, Imtiaz Ali Taj, Hayatullah Ansari, Rajinder Singh Bedi, Joginder Paal, Chiragh Hasan Hasrat, Anwar Sadid, Khadija Mastoor, Rasheed Ahmad Siddiqi, Zakir Hussain and many more.

=== Politicians ===
The scholars and speeches sections include names like Muhammad Ali Jinnah, Liaqat Ali Khan, Gandhi, A. K. Brohi, Sir Muhammad Zafarullah Khan, Huseyn Shaheed Suhrawardy, Dr. Salimuzzaman Siddiqui, Karrah Hussain, Bahadur Yar Jung, Abdul Hamid Khan Bhashani, Zulfikar Ali Bhutto, Rajendra Prasad.

=== Religious leaders ===
The religion section includes notably Syed Mohammad Razi, Zaheen Shah Taji, Muhammad Shafi, Allamah Rasheed Turabi. This also includes an exegesis of Quran in the voice of Ehtisham ul Haq Thanvi.

=== Painter artists ===
The smaller but a unique section consists of interviews of artists like Jimmy Engineer, Iqbal Geoffrey, Iqbal Mehdi, Bashir Mirza, Sadequain, Shakir Ali.

The story of this journey is penned in Tamashay-e-Ahal-e-Qalam that provides insights in efforts that were put to record them. Especially the struggle to record Faiz that is spread over time period of 20 years.

In his last years, he was digitising his audio library by transferring tapes on DVDs and computerising the catalogue.

== Photography and filming ==
Luftullah was also an avid photographer. While in Bombay, he used to borrow a 16mm Kodak movie camera from a friend to make movies at different locations. While in Karachi, he used to borrow a Rolleiflex camera from a friend who owned the Thackersons photography shop. He created albums of the city's old buildings and new build-ups that were taking shape to absorb the new country Pakistan and its administration. He made an album about Business on footpath covering portable shops on Karachi's footpaths, right from small businesses to snake charmers, palmists, lizard show, ear cleaner. There was another album called Business on wheels which shows fruit, vegetable, cloth, shoe merchants of Karachi on four-wheel carts. In 1951, he bought a Swiss made Bolex Paillard 16mm camera and started making documentaries.

One memorable documentary was about a cricket match between the Pakistani Prime minister, his cabinet and the parliament members at the Karachi Gymkhana. One side was led by Mohammad Ali Bogra and the other by Maulvi Tamizuddin Khan. The minister Mr. Chittophadia was bowling in his dhoti and Tamizuddin was batting in his sherwani, New Age Islam reported.

== Other collections ==
His personal gallery displays rare photographs, photography equipment, sound recording equipment and accessories, drawing instrument and stationery items used in documenting the collections, International and Pakistani coins, stamps and matchboxes.

A notable album in the collection of old Hindi and Hollywood movies posters, some of them dating back to the 1920s.

He has also transcribed all the Urdu Ghazals of Mirza Ghalib into Latin script.

== Literary works by him ==
Lutfullah authored a number of books in Urdu. Some of his works include Pehlu (1941), Bachpan ke Waqqaiyat (1991), Tamashay-e-Ahl-e-Qalam (1996), Sur Ki Talaash (1997), Hijraton Ke Silsile (an autobiography) (1998) and Zindagi Ik Safar (2000).

== Awards and recognition ==
- Luftullah's biggest legacy is his tremendous collection of audio recordings. It is the biggest personal collection of distinct audios in the country, second biggest collection after Radio Pakistan archive, and one of the rarest collection of voices of the notable people of South Asia.
- His autobiography Hijraton Ke Silsile won the Prime Minister's award in 1998.
- Kamal-e-Fun Award (Lifetime Achievement Award in Literature) from the Pakistan Academy of Letters in 2009.
- Arts Council of Pakistan, Karachi has named its audio-visual library as Lutfullah Khan Audio-Visual Library.
- Pride of Performance Award from the President of Pakistan in 2012 for his services to Pakistan.
- He was the 'guest of honor' on one episode of Geo News TV show Junoon-E-Gumgashta in 2011 hosted by Sania Saeed featuring his archival collections and his personal comments about them.
- Famous Pakistani television personality Anwar Maqsood Hameedi who was reportedly his friend for over 40 years, said after his death in 2012, that Lutfullah Khan protected and guarded his collection very diligently and "did not hand over his stuff to anyone else." Well-known poet Iftikhar Arif said, "If this nation is not able to preserve his collection, it will be a huge misfortune, because I’ve seen treasure troves being destroyed at radio and TV offices."

=== Commemorative postage stamp ===
- Pakistan Post Office issued a commemorative postage stamp to recognize his services in its 'The Archivist' series in 2012

== Death ==
Lutfullah Khan died on 3 March 2012 in Karachi at the age of 95. He is survived by a wife, two sons and three daughters.
