= Progressive Writers' Movement =

Progressive literary movement in pre-partition British India

The Progressive Writers' Association or the Progressive Writers' Movement of India or Anjuman Tarraqi Pasand Mussanafin-e-Hind (Urdu: انجمن ترقی پسند مصنفینِ ہند) or Akhil Bhartiya Pragatishil Lekhak Sangh (Hindi: अखिल भारतीय प्रगतिशील लेखक संघ) was a progressive literary movement in pre-partition British India. Some branches of this writers' group existed around the world besides in India and Pakistan.

These groups were anti-imperialistic and left-oriented, and sought to inspire people through their writings advocating equality among all humans and attacking social injustice and backwardness in the society.

According to the Dawn newspaper, the "Progressive Writers Movement in Urdu literature was the strongest movement after Sir Syed's education movement. The progressives contributed to Urdu literature some of the finest pieces of fiction and poetry. Undoubtedly, they were the trend-setters for the coming generation of writers."

== Organizations ==
- The Indian Progressive Writers' Association was set up in London in 1935.
- The Progressive Writers' Association was set up in Kolkata in July 1936.
- The All India Writers' Association was set up in Lucknow on 9 April 1936 under the leadership of Syed Sajjad Zahir and Ahmed Ali at the Rifa-e-Aam Club in Lucknow. Both of them invited Syed Fakhruddin Balley (known as Balley Alig)to join. Syed Fakhruddin Balley then initiated work to promote the Association. Many writers and poets like Hameed Akhtar, Faiz Ahmad Faiz, Ahmad Nadeem Qasmi, Saadat Hasan Manto and Ismat Chughtai joined the Association.
- The All Pakistan Progressive Writers' Association was set up in Pakistan in December 1947 after the Independence of Pakistan in 1947.

== History ==
=== Origin ===
The origin of the Progressive Writers' Movement can be traced to the publication of Angarey (Embers or Burning Coals), (Note: Also transliterated as Angaaray, Angarey, Angaarey, or Anghare. See "Angaarey". Sangat Review of South Asian Literature. 25 November 2014. Archived from the original on 11 January 2017. and "Progressive Writers' Association". Making Britain.) a collection of nine short stories and a one-act play by Ahmed Ali, Sajjad Zaheer, Rashid Jahan and Mahmud-uz-Zafar in 1932. The publication was met with outrage from civil and religious authorities and was banned by the government of United Provinces. On 5 April 1933, Mahmud-uz-Zafar published a statement titled In Defence of Angare: Shall We Submit to Gagging? in The Leader:

The authors of this book do not wish to make any apology for it. They leave it to float or sink of itself. They are not afraid of the consequences of having launched it. They only wish to defend 'the right of launching it and all other vessels like it' ... they stand for the right of free criticism and free expression in all matters of the highest importance to the human race in general and the Indian people in particular... Whatever happen to the book or to the authors, we hope that others will not be discouraged. Our practical proposal is the formation immediately of a League of Progressive Authors, which should bring forth similar collections from time to time both in English and the various vernaculars of our country. We appeal to all those who are interested in this idea to get in touch with us.

The idea of forming a League of Progressive Authors was presented for the first time in this statement which later expanded itself and became 'Indian Progressive Writers' Association'.

=== Indian Progressive Writers' Association, London ===
After the publication of Angarey and the furor that followed, Zaheer was sent to London by his father in March 1933 to study law. In London he came in contact with the members of the Indian student community including Muhammad Din Taseer, Mulk Raj Anand, Jyotirmoy Ghosh, Pramod Ranjan Sengupta and formed a literary circle of friends. The group also included progressive women like Hajra Begum. He also came into the contact of Communist revolutionary Ralph Winston Fox who encouraged him and Anand to form the Indian Progressive Writers’ Association in London. The association, composed mostly of Indian university students from Oxford, Cambridge and London, met for the first time on 24 November 1934 in a back room at the Nanking Restaurant, a Chinese restaurant in Denmark Street. Anand was elected as the president while Sengupta acted as the secretary of the association.

In 1935, he and Mulk Raj Anand went to Paris to attend the International Congress for Defense of Culture organised by André Gide, Henri Barbusse and André Malraux. Influenced by the conference the group decided to solidify the association and draft a manifesto to formulate the aims and objectives of the association.

The Manifesto of the Progressive Writers' Association was finally drafted in 1935 in London by Zaheer, Taseer, Anand, Sengupta, and Jyoti Ghosh. Zaheer sent the approved version of the manifesto to writers and friends in India, including K.M. Ashraf, Abdul Alim, Mahmud-uz-Zafar, Rashid Jahan, Hiren Mukherjee and Premchand. Premchand translated the manifesto into Hindi and published it in the October edition of Hans in 1934 while the English version of the manifesto was published in the February 1936 issue of the Left Review.

The manifesto was widely circulated among Indian students with literary interests and the group began to meet once or twice a month to read and critique each other's works.

=== First all-India Progressive Writers' Conference ===
In the summer of 1935 Zaheer returned to India and started working on setting up the All India Progressive Writers' Association in India. In order to garner support for the association he along with Ahmed Ali travelled to various cities in India and met with several writers including Firaq Gorakhpuri, Ehtesham Husain, Shivdan Singh Chauhan, Narendra Sharma, Amarnath Jha, and Tara Chand. They also attended the conference of Hindi and Urdu writers in Allahabad in December 1935, organized by Tara Chand under the aegis of the Hindustani Academy and met Premchand, Maulvi Abdul Haq, Josh Malihabadi, Munshi Daya Narayan Nigam.

In January 1936, Zaheer travelled to Amritsar to meet Rashid Jahan and Mahmuduzzafar where he also met Faiz Ahmed Faiz for the first time. The four of them travelled to Lahore to stay with Mian Iftikharuddin where they met various writers from Lahore including Sufi Ghulam Mustafa Tabassum, Akhtar Sheerani, Abdul Majeed Salik, Chiragh Hasan Hasrat, Mian Bashir, and Firoz Din Mansoor, garnering support for setting up a branch in Lahore. Sufi Tabassum was appointed its secretary.

After the establishment of branches in various cities, it was decided to hold an All-India conference on the sidelines of the annual session of the Indian National Congress which was to meet in Lucknow. The first All-India Progressive Writers' Conference was held in Lucknow on 10 April 1936 under the leadership of Sajjad Zaheer. Premchand was requested to preside over the conference. The conference was held at the Rifah-e-Aam Hall, with Ale Ahmad Suroor as the convenor and Chaudhry Mohammed Ali Rudaulvi as chairman of the Reception Committee. While Premchand delivered his presidential address titled Sahitya ka Udeshya (The Aim of Literature), papers were presented by Firaq Gorakhpuri, Mahmudazzafar, Ahmed Ali, and Surendra Nath Goswami. Other writers present were Faiz Ahmed Faiz, Mian Iftikharuddin, Yusuf Meherally, Indulal Yagnik, Jainendra Kumar, and Saghar Nizami. The conference was also attended by leftist leaders including Jai Prakash Narayan, Kamaladevi Chattopadhyay, and was supported by Congress leaders like Jawaharlal Nehru and Sarojini Naidu.

The first conference laid down the basic organisational structure of the movement. A national body under the name All-India Progressive Writers' Association (Anjuman Taraqqi Pasand Musannifin-e-Hind) was established. An All-India Committee consisting of representatives of the various regional branches, a Publication Committee and an Executive Committee was also adopted. The Constitution of the Association, which was drafted by Mahmud-uz-Zafar, Sajjad Zaheer, and Abdul Aleem was adopted by the conference. Zaheer was elected as the Secretary General of the All-India Progressive Writers Association (AIPWA). Important resolutions passed in the conference included a demand to the government for freedom of speech. Zaheer had traced the account of its formation in his book Roshnai.

In 1936, Sohail Azimabadi set up a branch of the PWA in Patna while Hasrat Mohani set up a similar branch in Kanpur. Shyam Kumari Nehru organised a major conference of the Hindi and Urdu writers in 1937 in Allahabad which was attended by writers such as Maulvi Abdul Haq, Acharya Narendra Dev, Pandit Ram Naresh Tripathi, Shivdan Singh Chauhan, Narendra Sharma, Ramesh Chandra Sinha and Om Prakash Singhal among others. Bishambhar Nath Pande the then secretary of the Allahabad branch of the PWA organised another similar conference in 1938 in Allahabad.

By the summer of 1938, when Anand returned to India after attending the international writers' conference held in Madrid and Barcelona, the association had already become an influential organisation with various regional and linguistic branches.

=== Second all-India Progressive Writers' Conference ===
The second conference of the association was held in Calcutta in 1938. The inaugural address of the conference was sent by Rabindranath Tagore who could not attend it due to ill health. Abdul Aleem was elected as the new General Secretary succeeding Zaheer and a newly amended constitution was adopted in the conference. The PWA also launched a monthly bulletin and a quarterly English journal called New Indian Writing.

=== Third all-India Progressive Writers' Conference ===
The third conference was organised at the Hardinge Library in Delhi in 1942. Krishan Chander, who was then working for the Delhi Radio Station, was the convener of the conference.

=== Fourth all-India Progressive Writers' Conference ===
The fourth all-India conference was held in Bombay from 22 May to 25 May 1943 at the Marwari Vidyalaya Hall. A revised version of the Manifesto was adopted at this conference. Zaheer was elected as the General Secretary of the association with Bishnu Dey and K. A. Abbas as joint secretaries and Mama Varerkar as the treasurer. The central office of the association was also moved from Lucknow to Bombay.

It could be said that the Urdu writers were in the forefront of 'Anjuman Taraqqi Pasand Musannifin', but later on almost all the writers of Indian languages had their own organisations with the same aims and objectives: struggle against British imperialism for the liberation of India from the foreign yoke; struggle against the henchmen of imperialism, land for the tillers of the soil. The organisation regarded socialism as the proper economic system, which could end exploitation. Rabindranath Tagore, Maulvi Abdul Haq, Chiragh Hasan Hasrat, Abdul Majeed Salik, Maulana Hasrat Mohani, Josh Malihabadi, Professor Ahmed Ali, Dr Akhtar Hussain Raipuri, Faiz Ahmed Faiz, Professor Majnun Gorakhpuri, Rashid Jahan, Sahibzada Mahmood uz Zafar, Professor Manzoor Hussain and Abdul Aleem were some of the stalwarts whose active or lukewarm support was with the Anjuman Taraqqi Pasand Musannifin.

The words "progress and progressive" have a history of their own. In 19th century England, the word "progressive" was the battle cry of all those who wanted a better deal for the underprivileged and wanted science and technology to spearhead the movement for social development. The 'movement for progress' touched all spheres of human development. It stood for liberation and democracy. It was a movement for the freedom-loving writers who were opposed to the status quo in the feudal-dominated Indian society. They thought that unless the Indian society was transformed and the common masses were in the driving seat, nothing could change. Writers like Krishan Chander, Ismat Chugtai, Saadat Hasan Manto, Ahmad Nadeem Qasmi, Ali Sardar Jafri, Sibte Hassan, Ehtesham Hussain, Mumtaz Hussain, Sahir Ludhianvi, Kaifi Azmi, Ali Abbas Hussaini, Makhdoom Mohiuddin, Farigh Bukhari, Khatir Ghaznavi, Raza Hamdani, M.Ibrahim Joyo, Sobho Gianchandani, Shaikh Ayaz, Rajinder Singh Bedi, Amrita Pritam, Ali Sikandar, Zoe Ansari, Majaz Lucknawi made it the strongest literary movement.

=== Pre-independence period ===
Leading Progressive Writers of Urdu such as Majaz, Kaifi Azmi, Josh Malihabadi, Makhdoom and others strongly campaigned for Pakistan through their works viz. poem by Majaz, Pakistan ka Trana; poem by Kaifi titled Ab Agli Id Ek Azad Pakistan Main Hogi and Josh Malihabadi’s epic poem projecting Mother India addressing Congress, League and the Communist Party.

=== Post-independence period ===
==== India ====
After the independence of India in 1947, the movement lost its momentum in India. It further declined in growth after the split of the Communist Party in 1964. In 1975, the Association was renamed as the National Federation of Progressive Writers. Since then, the Federation has had four Conferences, at Gaya (1975), Jabalpur (1980), Jaipur (1982) and the Golden Jubilee Conference in Lucknow (1986). The Golden Jubilee Conference was inaugurated by Mulk Raj Anand. Sibte Hasan also attended the conference.

Despite the absence of an institutional movement, the progressive movement remained vibrant in India, especially in Urdu poetry. Poets like Jan Nisar Akhtar, Ali Sardar Jafri, Kaifi Azmi, Sahir Ludhianvi and Makhdoom Mohiuddin wrote stirring poems celebrating the working class, condemning religious sectarianism and celebrating international figures such as Martin Luther King Jr., Patrice Lumumba, Jawaharlal Nehru (in the context of his international efforts) and Mao Zedong.

==== Pakistan ====
The All Pakistan Progressive Writers' Association was set up formally in December 1949 although several branches of the Progressive Writers Movement already existed in cities like Lahore and Karachi. The Progressive Papers Limited, a company established by Mian Iftikharuddin served as the institutional platform of the association. The company published journals and newspapers like Pakistan Times, Daily Imroze and Lail-o-Nihar which were edited by Faiz Ahmad Faiz, Ahmad Nadeem Qasmi and Sibte Hasan respectively.

The partition of the sub-continent also portioned the movement and with the sway of the McCarthyism in the USA, the movement was declared illegal in 1954 in Pakistan. Then the martial law of 1958 saw its rank and file working under different banners. 'Awam Adbi Anjuman' was revived during the PPP Government in 1971. Rafiq Chaudhry, Shaukat Siddiqui, Hasan Abidi, Ateeq Ahmad, and Hamidi Kashmiri had supported it. However, in 2007, it was organised on a countrywide basis under an interim constitution. During this period Hameed Akhtar and Rahat Saeed worked very hard, and organised a general body meeting in Lahore in 2012 to elect another team of office-bearers with a mandate to get its new constitution passed by 4 March 2012. Dr Mohammad Ali Siddiqui was elected as its new President unopposed, Salim Raz was elected its Secretary General, Rasheed Misbah, its Deputy Secretary General, Dr Qazi Abid its joint secretary and Maqsood Khaliq, its deputy secretary co-ordinator. Soon after the election, South African Free Media Association (SAFMA) invited the new office-bearers at a dinner presided over by Munnu Bhai, Dr Muhammad Ali Siddiqui, newly elected president of PWA, and Rahat Saeed, the outgoing Acting Secretary General were the guests of honour. Replying to a question by the journalist Imtiaz Alam as to what challenges the PWA of today, considered relevant, as the previous contention of the PWA, 'the battle of ideas', had become irrelevant, the newly elected president PWA contended that the battle of ideas is still going on. And how could it be considered a closed chapter, when a few hundred multinationals in the world had in their coffers 50 percent of the world's GDP. He thought that, in Pakistan, the rate of poverty was rising alarmingly and even if the rate of illiteracy as a yardstick of poverty is taken into account, more than 50 percent of the people were not literate.

In their Karachi meeting in 2007, some of Pakistan's progressive writers planned to reactivate the Progressive Writers Association as a body again after a lapse of 53 years, and elected the veteran Hameed Akhtar as the secretary-general of the association.

== Writers ==
Prominent members of the movement have included:

- Mirza Adeeb
- Hameed Akhtar
- Jan Nisar Akhtar
- Ahmed Ali
- Mulk Raj Anand
- Sulaiman Areeb
- Idris Azad
- Kaifi Azmi
- Rajinder Singh Bedi
- Farigh Bukhari
- Somen Chanda
- Krishan Chander
- Ismat Chughtai
- Vijaydan Detha
- Faiz Ahmad Faiz
- Ahmed Faraz
- Khatir Ghaznavi
- Firaq Gorakhpuri
- Majnun Gorakhpuri
- Sibt-e-Hassan
- Bhupen Hazarika
- Ali Sardar Jafri
- Rashid Jahan
- Habib Jalib
- Shamim Karhani
- Majaz Lucknawi
- Sahir Ludhianvi
- Zafar Mairaj
- Josh Malihabadi
- Sadat Hassan Manto
- Makhdoom Mohiuddin
- Gul Khan Nasir
- Prem Nath
- Munshi Premchand
- Amrita Pritam
- Ahmed Nadeem Qasmi
- Saadat Saeed
- Bhisham Sahni
- Rahul Sankrityayan
- Himayat Ali Shair
- Muhammad Ali Siddiqui
- Salma Siddiqui
- Majrooh Sultanpuri
- Gulam Rabbani Taban
- Habib Tanvir
- M. D. Taseer
- Fikr Taunsvi
- Khagendra Thakur
- Sajjad Zaheer
- Ali Jawad Zaidi
- Shridhar Raina Zar

== See also ==
- Pak Tea House
- Communist Party of India
- Communist Party of Pakistan
- Islamic feminism
- Khilafat Movement
- Liberalism and progressivism within Islam

== Cited sources ==
- Jalil, Rakhshanda (2014). Liking Progress, Loving Change: A Literary History of the Progressive Writers' Movement in Urdu. Oxford University Press. ISBN 978-0-19-809673-3.
- Ẓahir, Sajjād (2014). Angarey: 9 Stories and a Play. Rupa Publications India. ISBN 978-81-291-3108-9.
- Malik, Hafeez (1967). "The Marxist Literary Movement in India and Pakistan". The Journal of Asian Studies. 26 (4): 649–664. doi:10.2307/2051241. ISSN 0021-9118. JSTOR 2051241.
- Ramnath, Maia (26 April 2019), "The Progressive Writers Association", Oxford Research Encyclopedia of Asian History, Oxford University Press, doi:10.1093/acrefore/9780190277727.013.337, ISBN 978-0-19-027772-7
- Coppola, Carlo (1981). "The Angare Group: The Enfants Terribles of Urdu Literature". Annual of Urdu Studies. 1: 57–69.
- Mir, Ali Husain; Mir, Raza (2006a). Anthems of Resistance: A Celebration of Progressive Urdu Poetry. Roli Books Private Limited. ISBN 978-93-5194-065-4.
- Ahmed, Talat (2009). Literature and Politics in the Age of Nationalism: The Progressive Writers' Movement in South Asia, 1932-56. Routledge, Taylor & Francis Group. ISBN 978-0-415-48064-2.
- Mahmud, Shabana (1996a). "Angāre and the Founding of the Progressive Writers' Association". Modern Asian Studies. 30 (2): 447–467. doi:10.1017/S0026749X0001653X. ISSN 0026-749X. JSTOR 313015.
- Sahni, Bhisham (1986). "The Progressive Writers' Movement". Indian Literature. 29 (6 (116)): 178–183. ISSN 0019-5804. JSTOR 24159089.
- Zaheer, Sajjad (2006). The Light: A History of the Movement for Progressive Literature in the Indo-Pakistan Subcontinent : a Translation of Roshnai. Translated by Afzar, Amina. Oxford University Press. ISBN 978-0-19-547155-7.
