= Gorakhpuri =

Gorakhpuri is a surname, also used as a pen name, in India. It is related to the city of Gorakhpur or the Gorakhpur district in the Indian state of Uttar Pradesh.

Notable people with the name include:

- Firaq Gorakhpuri (1896–1982), Indian writer, critic, and Urdu poet
- Majnun Gorakhpuri (1904–1988), Indian-born Urdu writer, poet, and literary critic
- Qamruddin Ahmad Gorakhpuri (1938–2024), Indian Islamic scholar, Hadith professor, and Sheikh
- Shah Alam Gorakhpuri (born 1969), Indian Islamic scholar

== See also ==
- Firaq Gorakhpuri: The Poet of Pain & Ecstasy, a book about Firaq Gorakhpuri
