= Zamin Ali =

India Urdu poet (1893–1955)

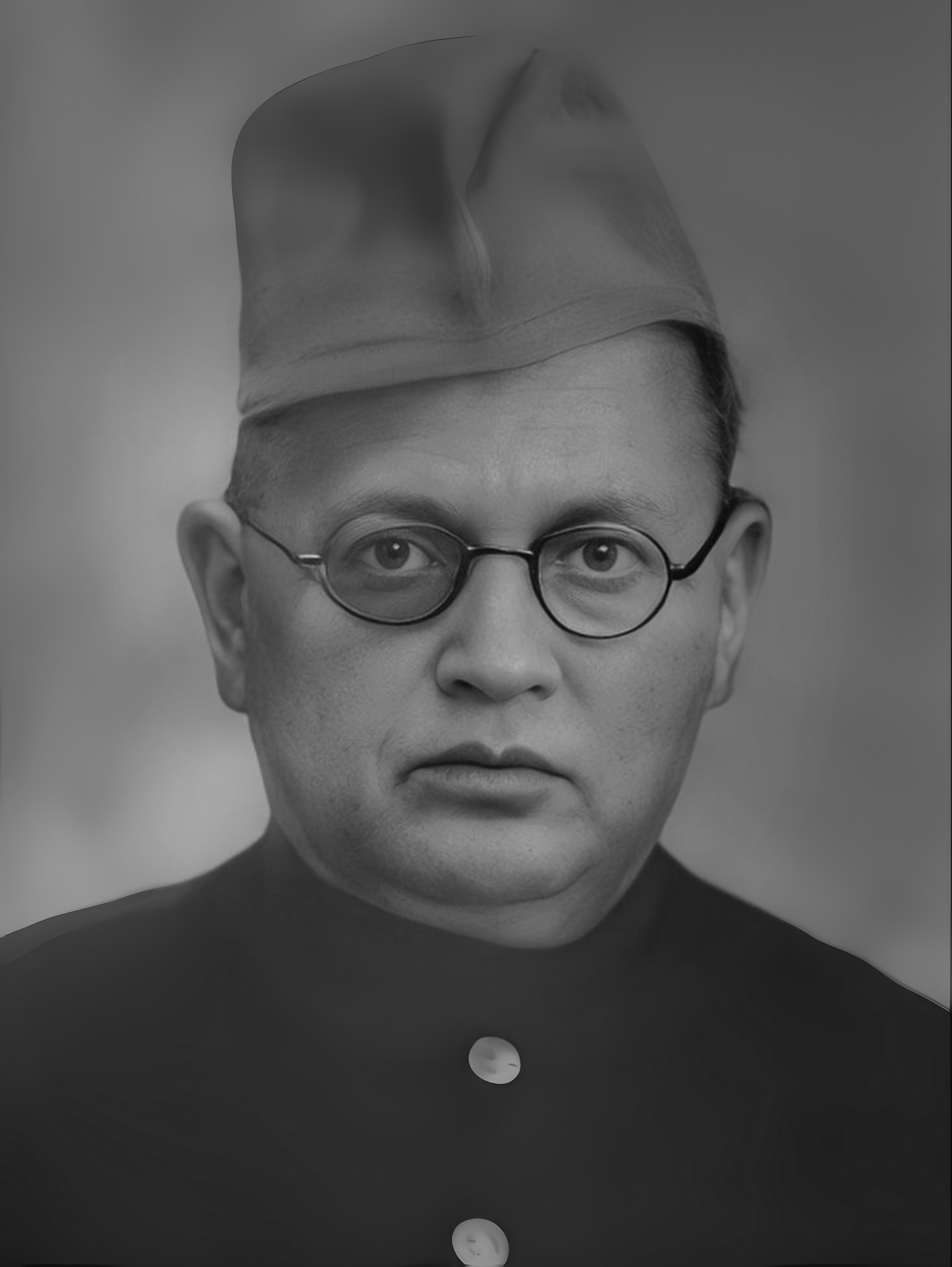
- Born: Syed Mohammed Zamin Ali Naqvi; 25 June 1893; Mustafabad, District Raebareli, United Provinces, India
- Died: 25 April 1955 (aged 61); Allahabad (now Prayagraj), Uttar Pradesh, India
- Burial place: Shia Qabristan, Allahabad
- Other name: Zamin
- Education: Ewing Christian College (B.A.); Muir College (M.A.)
- Occupations: Educator, academic, poet, author
- Years active: 1915–1955
- Era: British Era India, Post Independence India
- Employer(s): University of Allahabad, Ewing Christian College
- Known for: Ghazal, Qasida, Marsiya, Textbooks
- Notable work: Ghazaliyat-e-Zamin, Kalaam-e-Zamin, Majmua-e-Qasaid-o-Salaam, Urdu Zabaan-o-adab
- Spouse: Nazneen Begum (m. 1933)
- Children: Mohammed Haider, Fatima Hasan, Mansoora Haider, Nasera Sharma, Mazhar Haider
- Father: Majid Syed Wajid Ali

Syed Mohammad Zamin Ali Naqvi (1893–1955) popularly known as Zamin Ali was an Indian poet, author and educator. He has been referred to as "Baba-e-Urdu" or father of Urdu by Firaq Gorakhpuri and others.

As an educator, he established the first Urdu department in un-divided India in 1924 at Allahabad University, systematized Urdu education from the primary to the PhD levels across India through the creation of curricula and textbooks, ensured Marsiyas were recognized as an art-form besides their religious content, and was an important contributor to Hindustani Academy's effort to establish Hindustani as a dual-script language based on Mahatma Gandhi's vision.

As a poet, with the pen-name "Zamin", he belonged to the Lucknow school of poetry and is a leading exemplar of Urdu poetry of his times. His poetic works include Ghazaliyat-e-Zamin, Kalaam-e-Zamin, and Majmua-e-Qasaid-o-Salaam. Ghazaliyat-e-Zamin was re-published by Rekhta Publishers and released by Javed Akhtar at the Jashn-e-Rekhta festival in 2024.

== Early life ==
Zamin Ali was born in Mustafabad village in the Raebareli district of United Provinces on 25 June 1893 in a Shia Syed Zamindar family with a strong literary tradition. He was the youngest son of Majid Syed Wajid Ali. His paternal grandfather, Syed Nauroz Ali, maternal grandfather Ustad Mir Ali Obaid "Naisa", and older brother, Syed Hamid Ali, were well-known Urdu poets. He started composing nazms and ghazals at the age of 13 under the guidance of "Naisa" following the traditions of the Lucknow school of poetry.

His early education was at St. John's College, Agra from where he received his High School (10th grade) and, in 1910, his Intermediate (12th grade) degree. He then received his B.A from Ewing Christian College, Allahabad in 1916 followed by an M.A. in Persian from Muir College, Allahabad in 1922.

He joined the faculty of Ewing Christian College in 1922 to teach Persian and was appointed lecturer in the Persian department of Allahabad University in 1924.

To pursue a literary career and his love for Urdu language and literature, he decided to live in Allahabad (now Prayagraj) and stayed away from his zamindari properties.

== Founding the first Urdu Department in Undivided India ==
In 1922, Zamin Ali, as a new faculty member in the Persian department at Allahabad University, proposed that there be separate departments for Urdu as well as Hindi given their cultural importance. At that time, no Urdu department existed at any University in undivided India and Urdu was often parts of departments such as Oriental Studies or Persian.

Zamin Ali's proposal was accepted by the Vice Chancellor, Sir Ganganath Jha leading to establishing the Department of Urdu in 1924. He was appointed the head of the department, a position that he held until his death in 1955. He was appointed a reader in 1932 and professor in 1945

Zamin Ali created MA and PhD programs in Urdu. His notable students with literary fame include Syed Ejaz Hussain, Nawab Hussain, Syed Waqar Azeem, Rafiq Husain, Gyan Chand Jain, Masihuzzaman and Fatima Akhtar.

He started a publication, "Naisa", that was the flagship annual magazine of the Urdu department and was also the editor of the Urdu section of the Allahabad University's annual magazine.

== Effort on Hindustani as the National Language of India ==
Zamin was a founding member and Vice-President of the Hindustani Academy that was formed in 1927 to build on Mahatma Gandhi's vision of Hindustani as the national language of India written in both the Nagari and Urdu.

At its first meeting in Lucknow on 30 March 1927, the Academy setup Urdu and Hindi survey committees to assess the state of each language's literature. Zamin headed the Urdu survey committee and produced the report, Urdu Zaban-o-Adab. This book summarizes Urdu linguistics and is considered more comprehensive than Sir George Greison's 'Linguistic Survey of India'.

Mahatma Gandhi visited Allahabad University on 17 November 1928 and praised the work being done by Zamin and the Academy.

Zamin was responsible for production of the Urdu version of the Hindustani magazine that was the flagship publication of the Hindustani Academy from its establishment in 1931 until he gave up his position in 1945.

Despite support by Gandhi and Nehru, once it was clear that India was going to be divided, the effort to have Hindustani as language with dual-scripts gave way to Pakistan adopting Urdu in the Urdu-script as its national language and India adopting Hindi in the Nagari script as well as Urdu in the Urdu-script as scheduled official languages.

== Contributions to Urdu Education in Un-divided India ==
After founding the first Urdu department at a University, Zamin Ali spear-headed the design of curricula and writing of textbooks for all levels of Urdu education as well as Urdu-medium education in other subjects across un-divided India. This led to him being called Baba-e-Urdu (Father of Urdu) and Khizr-e-raah Urdu (Guide of Urdu) by Firaq Gorakhpuri and others for four decades.

His contributions to Urdu education were recognized by the Indian Government by issuing a postal stamp in his honor on 25 June 1980. Twenty million stamps, denominated at 30 paisa, showing a picture of Zamin Ali were printed. The first day cover illustration is a view of the Muir Central College Building of Allahabad University.

His contributions to Urdu were also recognized by the British Government by awarding him the civilian version of the M.B.E medal (Member of the Most Excellent Order of the British Empire) in 1946.

Zamin served as chairman or member of various boards of education including the United Provinces Board of High School & Intermediate Education and the Rajputana Board of Education that covered Rajputana and Central India as well as current day Madhya Pradesh and Rajasthan. He also served on Urdu studies boards at several Universities including Agra University and Allahabad University.

Besides encouraging others to write textbooks in Urdu, he personally wrote several textbooks that include Urdu Shayari (4 volumes) covering selections of important poets over the last 3 centuries, rapid readers for use in primary education such as Gauhar-e-Ceylon that was an entertaining account of life in a neighboring country. Other textbooks worthy of mention are Khat-e-Shikast and Intikhaab-e-Mairaaj.

He took leadership in ensuring that Marsiya and Qasida were considered art forms and extracts of works by Mir Anees and Dabeer were included in textbooks. He wrote Waqayat-e-Karbala that introduced the persona mentioned in the story of Karbala so that everyone could understand Qasida and Marsiya.

As a result of Zamin's efforts, Urdu went from being a language used by authors and the general population to Urdu literature and language being systematized and formally taught. Urdu departments formed at 55 Indian Universities and Urdu started being taught in thousands of schools across India.

== Contributions to Urdu Poetry ==
Zamin's poetry followed the traditions of Lucknow School of Poetry in the lineage of Munir Shikohabadi, Nasikh and Naisa. His published poetic works include Ghazaliyat-e-Zamin, Kalam-e-Zamin, Kulliyat -e- Hazrat Zamin, and Majmua Qasaid-o-Salaam.

His book, Ghazaliyat-e-Zain was re-published by Rekhta Publishers and released by Javed Akhtar at the Jash-e-Rekhta festival in New Delhi on 14 Dec 2024. According to Javed Akhtar, Zamin's poetry is an authentic exemplar of the poetry of his times of the highest order. It addresses sensitive topics with grace and creates layers of meaning through use of both Persian closures as well as day to day language.

In addition to being a good poet himself, Zamin organized and chaired major mushairas of his time. He held a monthly Mushaira at Kashan-e-Adab, his home, in Allahabad. Well-known poets would stay at the Mahman Khana (Guest house) at Kashan-e-Adab for 10–12 days in Zamin's hospitality to participate. These included Hafeez Jalandhari, Roosh Siddiqi, Saail Dehlvi, Kaifi Azmi, Hadi Machlishahri, Safi Lakhnavi, Bekhud Mohani, Mahshar Lakhnavi, Jigar Moradabadi, Firaq Gorakhpuri, and Josh Malihabadi.

Mushairas run by Zamin were open to all to promote Urdu language and literature. The Mehman Khana run by Zamin was open to all Urdu scholars. This included several students at Allahabad University whose lodging, food and medical expenses were borne by Zamin. It also included people coming to Allahabad for medical treatment.

Zamin chaired an annual Mushaira at Muslim Boarding House at Allahabad University that was a major mushaira of its time. According to recollections by Josh Malihabadi and Kaifi Azmi published in 1982, Zamin encouraged them recite their patriotic poetry that was banned by the British government at this Mushaira.

With the assistance of Firaq Gorakhpuri, Zamin organized an All India Mushaira to celebrate the Golden jubilee of Allahabad University in 1937 in which poets from all over India participated.

== Acclaim for Zamin ==
Zamin Ali received a number of positive comments on his life's work from national leaders, as well as poets.

"To be in his company, was a delightful hour. He was on the forefront ceaselessly working for the promotion of Urdu with his intellect working in lightning flashes."

— Jawaharlal Nehru, Prime Minister of India (1955)

"He was a successful teacher, a good scholar and a polished man whose manner and generosity left a deep imprint on those who came in his contact."

— Dr. Zakir Husain, President of India, 1955

"Prof. Ali was an Urdu scholar of repute and rendered yeomen services for the promotion of Urdu in India. He was a leading personality of his time."

— Indira Gandhi, Prime Minister of India, 1974

"Prof. Ali was one of the early stalwarts who did a lot for the development of Urdu language and literature in the country."

— Fakhruddin Ali Ahmed, President of India, 1974

"He shines as a doyen of Urdu advancement in India. His talent was versatile and his knowledge was as encyclopedic in range as unfathomable in depth and remarkable in accuracy."

— Raghupati Sahay "Firaq Gorakhpuri", Indian Poet, 1974

"Just as Shahjahan created Taj Mahal for his love, Zamin for his country, people and future generations made Urdu a complete discipline and department."

— Kaifi Azmi, Indian Poet and lyricist, 1974

"Professor Zamin Ali was an embodiment of scholarship and human values. He stood for noble virtues and did a lot for the advancement of Urdu in India."

— Harivansh Rai Bachchan, Indian Poet and writer, 1974

"Prof. Ali was a bright star of scholarship whose depth of knowledge impressed and influenced many. He was above caste, creed or color prejudices"

— Sumitranandan Pant, Indian Poet, 1974

== Selected poetry by Zamin ==
=== Topic: Urdu ===
Source: pp 32–34 of Ghazaliyat-e-Zamin

He wrote the nazm Faryaad-e-Urdu at a time when English was becoming increasingly dominant. Here are a few selected couplets that appear in the introduction written by Fatima Hasan. Several of these were read by Ali Fazal at the Jashn-e-Rekhta festival on 15 December 2024 .

aap se faryaad karne aai hai Urdu zabaaN
gar munaasib ho to hazrat sun leiN uski daastaaN

आप से फ़रियाद करने आई है उर्दू ज़बान
गर मुनासिब हो तो हज़रत सुन लें उसकी दास्ताँ

yaad haiN vo bhi jab aashiq zamaana tha mira
bachche bachche ki zabaaN par bhi fasaana tha mira

याद है वो भी जब आशिक जमाना था मेरा
बच्चे-बच्चे की ज़बां पर भी फ़साना था मेरा

is sire se us sire tak mulk meN phaili thi maiN
jis ka kul hindostaaN majnuuN tha aur Laila thi maiN

इस सिरे से उस सिरे तक मुल्क में फैली थी मैं
जिस का कुल हिंदोस्तां मजनूं था और लैला थी मैं

mujh pe marte the musalmaaN mujh pe hindu the nisaar
faarsi bhi jheNpti thi dekh kar mera singaar

मुझ पे मरते थे मुसलमान, मुझ पे हिंदू थे निसार
फ़ारसी भी झेनपती थी देख कर मेरा सिंगार

aap angrezi ka aaKhir kyon tatabboh kiijiye
aur ilzaam-e-jahaalat apne sar kyoN liijiye

आप अंग्रेजी का आख़िर क्यों ततब्बो कीजिये
और इल्ज़ाम-ए-जहालत अपने सर क्यों लीजिए

ik behn hindi hai meri jiska ab chamka hai bhaag
hashr tak qaayam rahe parmaatma iska suhaag

एक बहन हिंदी है मेरी जिसका अब चमका है भाग
हश्र तक कायम रहे परमात्मा इसका सुहाग

Ghair mulki lafz-jaari jo zabaanoN meiN nahiiN
isse to hindi ke aasaaN lafz behtar haiN kahiiN

ग़ैर मुल्की लफ़्ज़-जारी जो ज़बानों में नहीं
इससे तो हिंदी के आसान लफ्ज बेहतर हैं कहीं

=== Topic: Zindagi ===
Source: Page 49 of Ghazaliyat-e-Zamin

jumbish hi ko zamaane meiN kahte haiN zindagi
hai maut ek naam sukuun aur qaraar ka

जुम्बिश ही को ज़माने में कहते हैं ज़िन्दगी
है मौत एक नाम सुकून और क़रार का  

=== Topic: Eschewing communal strife ===
Source:Page 7 of Ghazaliyat-e-Zamin

sun ke dair-o-haram ke jhagRoN ko
ham ne donoN ko hi salaam kiyaa

सुन के दैर-ओ-हरम के झगड़ों को 
हम ने दोनों को ही सलाम किया

=== Topic: On Mahatama Gandhi's death ===
Source:Page 35 of Ghazaliyat-e-Zamin

bazm-e-aalam ho kyon tiira-o-taar
shama-e-insaaniyat khamosh hai aaj

बज़्म-ए-आलम हो क्यों तीरा-ओ-तार
शमा-ए-इंसानियत खामोश है आज

=== Topic: Ishq ===
Source:Page 86 of Ghazaliyat-e-Zamin

ishq hi vo marz hai k duniya meN
jis ka baRhna bhi na-gavaar nahiiN

इश्क़ ही वो मर्ज़ है दुनिया में
जिस का बढ़ना भी नागावार नहीं

Source:Page 56 of Ghazaliyat-e-Zamin

dard-e-firaaq, daaGh-e-jigar, aah-e-na-rasaa
shikva nahiiN hai, ishq ne jo kuch diya, diya

दर्द-ए-फ़िराक़, दाग़-ए-जिगर, आह-ए-ना-रसा
शिकवा नहीं है, इश्क ने जो कुछ दिया, दिया

Source:Page 77 of Ghazaliyat-e-Zamin

umr bhar duuNga duayeN ishq-e-Khush anjaam ko
dil mira dil ho gaya Gham aashna hone ke baad

उमर भर दूंगा दुआएं इश्क-ए-खुश अंजाम को
दिल मेरा दिल हो गया गम आशना होने के बाद

Source:Page 106 of Ghazaliyat-e-Zamin

tamaam umr kaTi apni yaas-o-hirmaaN meN
qafas meN chain na aaraam tha gulistaaN meN

तमाम उमर कटी अपनी यास-ओ-हिरमान में
कफ़स में चैन न आराम था गुलिस्तां में

=== Topic: Motivational ===
Source:Page 155 of Ghazaliyat-e-Zamin

riyaazat ka milega phal tujhe bhi Gham na kha Zamin
tiri shaaKh-e-tamanna bhi kisi din baarwar hogi

रियाज़त का मिलेगा फ़ल तुझे भी ग़म न खा ज़मीन
तेरी शाख-ए-तमन्ना भी किसी दिन बारवर होगी

== Selected Ghazals celebrating Zamin ==
=== Aziz on Zamin ===
Source: Prof. Zamin Ali The Educator

HameiN bhi yaad rakhein jab likheiN tareekh gulshan ki,
Ki humne bhi lutaya hai chaman mein aashiyaN apna

हमें भी याद रखें जब लिखें तारीख गुलशन की,
कि हमने भी लुटाया है चमन में आशियां अपना

Remember me when you write the history of the garden
For I too did spread in the garden the largesse of my nest

=== Bismil Allahabadi on Zamin ===
Source: Ghazaliyat-e-Zamin

ilm se zı̄-vaqār thā 'zamin'
shahar kı̄ yādgār thā 'zamin'
koı̄ dekhe zabāñ-e-urdu par
dil se, jaañ se, nisār thā 'zamin'
kahte haiñ sabse ye, havā-e-adab
ek taaza bahār thā 'zamin'
qaul hai ye durust 'bismil' kā
bā.is-e-iftiḳhār thā 'zamin'
इल्म से ज़ि-वकार था 'ज़ामिन'
शहर की यादगार था 'ज़ामिन'
कोई देखे ज़बान-ए-उर्दू पर
दिल से, जान से, निसार था 'ज़ामिन'

कहते हैं सबसे ये, हवा-ए-अदब
एक ताज़ा बहार था 'ज़ामिन'
क़ौल है ये दुरुस्त 'बिस्मिल' का
बैइस-ए-इफ़्तिहार था 'ज़ामिन'
