= Tabassum (disambiguation) =

Tabassum (1944–2022) was an Indian actress and talk show host.

Tabassum may also refer to:

- Tabassum or Ghulam Mustafa Tabassum (1899–1978), Pakistani poet
- Tabassum (name), includes a list of people with the given name and surname
