= Hindustani Academy =

Government literary organization

- Formation: 22 January 1927; 99 years ago
- Founded at: Allahabad (now Prayagraj)
- Type: Literary organization
- Purpose: Preserving and promoting languages like Hindi, Urdu, Braj Bhasha, Awadhi, Bhojpuri, Bundeli and other Indian languages
- Headquarters: Prayagraj, Uttar Pradesh
- Region served: India
- Methods: Publishing/republishing books, digitalization of books, library, awarding writers, organizing literary and cultural events, etc.
- Fields: Literature
- Parent organization: Language Department of the Government of Uttar Pradesh
- Affiliations: Government of Uttar Pradesh
- Website: Official website

Hindustani Academy is an autonomous literary organization runs under the Language Department of the Government of Uttar Pradesh. Founded in 1927, it is based in Prayagraj, Uttar Pradesh. The organization is dedicated to the preservation, promotion, and development of languages such as Hindi, Urdu, Braj Bhasha, Awadhi, Bhojpuri, Bundeli, etc., and their respective literature.

== History ==
Hindustani Academy, situated in Prayagraj, was founded by the Government of the United Province on 22 January 1927. The inauguration ceremony took place on 29 March 1927, in Lucknow, with the then Governor William Morris presiding over the event. Hindustani Academy was founded with the assistance of the then Education Minister of the United Provinces, Rajeshwar Bali, Pandit Yajnanarayan Upadhyay from Banaras, Hafiz Hidayat Hussain and Tej Bahadur Sapru.

The organization was established to enrich and popularize Hindi and its allied languages. Apart from preserving and promoting Hindi, its literature, and other forms like Urdu, Brajbhasha, Bhojpuri, and Awadhi, the academy aims to translate literary works from non-Hindi Indian languages and foreign languages into Hindi and promote original Hindi works and creative literature.

Sir Tej Bahadur Sapru served as the first president of the Hindustani Academy. It had its first council comprising writers like Premchand, Ayodhya Prasad Upadhyay, and Shyam Sundar Das. After Sapru, Rai Rajeshwar Bali, Dr. Ramkumar Verma, Dr. Jagdish Gupt, Dr. Yogendra Pratap Singh, Justice Dr. Surendranath Dwivedi, Justice Kamalakant Verma, Kailash Gautam, and others have served as the president of the Hindustani Academy.

In the past, the academy hosted prominent Hindi and Urdu writers like Munshi Premchand, Rahul Sankrityayan, Mahavir Prasad Dwivedi, Mahadevi Verma, Firaq Gorakhpuri, Jagadish Gupta in open discussions and talks.

In 2014, as part of its initiative, Hindustani Academy revived its legacy by publishing rare pre-Independence Hindi and Urdu works. It re-published 20 rare books, including Raja Bhoj (1932), Awadh Kosh (1934), Prayag Pradeep' (1937), Hindustan Ka Naya Dastoore-Hukumat, Karuna Vasta me Hindustani Tehjeeb and Intkhabe Daag from the pre-independence era, along with a collection of letters of Mirza Ghalib.

== Library ==
A large library is situated at the Hindustani Academy where ancient books, literary works, and manuscripts are preserved. In the Hindustani Academy library, there are 25,000 books available in Hindi, Urdu, Sanskrit, English, Bengali, Marathi, Gujarati, and other Indian languages. It also includes three hundred ancient manuscripts, comprising handwritten and monoblock printed copies, along with a collection of over 8,000 literary magazines and newspapers.

=== Digitalization of literary works ===
Hindustani Academy has undertaken the digitalization and preservation of its library collection, comprising thousands of books. Approximately 25,000 books from the library have been scanned and uploaded in digital format, which includes 15,000 Hindi books, 2,000 Urdu books, and 300 manuscripts. The digitalization efforts extend to Hindustani Academy's magazines, Hindustani, Hans, Chand, Saraswati, Madhuri, and Madhyam Patrika. The process of digitizing these literary works took three years.

== Activities ==
=== Literary awards ===
Hindustani Academy encourages writers by awarding national and state-level honors. At the national stage, it presents the Guru Gorakhnath Shikhar Samman (₹5,00,000), Goswami Tulsidas Samman (₹5,00,000), and Sant Kabir Das Samman (₹4,00,000) for literary contributions in early Hindi literature, Bhakti-era literature, and contributions to the Nirguna Bhakti tradition, respectively.

At the state level, the academy presents awards such as the Bharatendu Harishchandra Samman (₹2,00,000), Mahavir Prasad Dwivedi Samman (₹2,00,000), Mahadevi Verma Samman (₹1,00,000), Firaq Gorakhpuri Samman (₹1,00,000), Bhikhari Thakur Bhojpuri Samman (₹1,00,000), Banadas Awadhi Samman (₹1,00,000), Kumbhandas Brajbhasha Samman (₹1,00,000), and Isuri Bundeli Samman (₹1,00,000). It also recognizes young writers with an award named Hindustani Academy Yuva Lekhan Samman of 11,000 rupees.

== Controversies ==
The appointment of Sunil Jogi as the chairman of the Hindustani Academy in April 2013 stirred controversy, as literary associations questioned his alleged lack of significant contributions to the field of literature and raised concerns about the selection process and Jogi's suitability for the role. A signature campaign was launched by three writers' associations, the Progressive Writers' Association (PWA), Janvadi Lekhak Sangh (JLS) and Jan Sanskrit Manch.
