= Hasan Abidi =

Pakistani journalist

- Born: 7 July 1929; Zafarabad, Jaunpur district, British India
- Died: 6 September 2005 (aged 76); Karachi, Pakistan
- Occupations: Journalist, Political activist and Trade unionist
- Years active: 1955 – 2005

Hasan Abidi (Urdu: حسن عابدی) (7 July 1929 – 6 September 2005) was a Pakistani journalist, writer, political activist and an Urdu language poet.

== Early life and career ==
He was born on 7 July 1929 in Zafarabad, Jaunpur district, Uttar Pradesh, and educated in Azamgarh and Allahabad (British India) and after the partition of India in 1947, he moved to Pakistan and settled in Karachi in 1948 and associated himself with journalism and writing. He became president of the Karachi Press Club and held office in both the Karachi Union of Journalist and the Pakistan Federal Union of Journalists. Hasan Abidi was an active trade unionist as well. He was also an active member of the Irtiqa forum.

Abidi started his journalistic career working for the Urdu language daily newspaper Afaq in 1955. He joined Lail-o-Nahar magazine in 1957 which was then edited by Faiz Ahmad Faiz and Sibte Hassan. Both belonged to the Progressive Writers Association and influenced Abidi.

Later, Abidi moved to Karachi to work for the Akhbar-e-Khwateen magazine and soon became its editor before moving on to work for Dawn newspaper.

== Work ==
His collections of poetry are Navisht-i-Nai (1995), Jareeda (1998) and Farar Hona Huroof ka (2004). He had also translated fellow journalist Eqbal Ahmed's essays into Urdu and written stories and poems for children. Hasan Abidi wrote both ghazals and nazms. He was more in control of his craft in the traditional confines of the ghazal but chose another style and content for his nazms. Most of his nazms are a narrative of the socio-political aspects of the society. He persistently elegizes the changing value system that he finds alien and disconcerting. His collection of poems, Farar Hona Huroof Ka, was published in 2004, by Scheherzade, Karachi.

== Death and legacy ==
Hasan Abidi died of a heart attack on 6 September 2005 in Karachi at age 76. He had handed in his latest column the previous evening at his workplace. He once suffered heart trouble in the 1970s, but had recovered well and continued his professional career with vigor until the last week of his life. Among the survivors were his wife and three children – a son and two daughters.

On 18 September 2005, a couple weeks after Hasan Abidi's death, Karachi Press Club and the Progressive Writers Association organized an event in Karachi to pay tributes to Hasan Abidi.

== See also ==
- List of Pakistani journalists
- Pakistan Federal Union of Journalists
