= Tabassum (name) =

Tabassum (تبسم) is a given name and surname. Tabassum is primarily a feminine name and surname of Arabic origin that means "smiling". Notable people with the name include:

== Given name ==
- Tabassum Adnan (born 1977), Pakistani women's rights activist
- Tabassum Akhlaq (born 1964), Pakistani writer
- Begum Tabassum Hasan (born 1970), Indian politician
- Tabassum Hashmi or Tabu (born 1971), Indian actress
- Tabassum Ferdous Shaon (born 1979), Bangladeshi model

== Surname ==
- Azad Ali Tabassum (born 1968), Pakistani politician
- Ghulam Mustafa Tabassum (1899–1978), Pakistani poet
- Marina Tabassum (born 1968/1969), Bangladeshi architect
- Rukshana Tabassum (born 1985), Indian actress
- Shukria Tabassum (2006–2015), Afghan child murder victim
- Wajida Tabassum (1935–2011), Indian writer
- Zakia Tabassum, Bangladeshi politician

== See also ==
- Tabassum (1944–2022), Indian actress and talk show host
