= Ehsan Rashid =

Ehsan Rashid (1927–2002) was a Pakistani economist, academic who served as vice chancellor of the University of Karachi from 1976 to 1979.

== Life ==
Rashid was born to Rasheed Ahmad Siddiqui. He studied economics at Aligarh Muslim University, where he later worked as a lecturer. He earned a doctorate from the University of Bonn in 1956, with research on Joseph Schumpeter's theory of innovation.

After moving to Pakistan, he joined the University of Karachi and later became head of its Department of Economics. In 1970, he founded the Applied Economics Research Centre and served as its first director. He became vice chancellor of the University of Karachi in 1976 but later resigned.

In 1980, Rashid spent a year as a visiting professor at Harvard University. He subsequently served as Pakistan's ambassador to Jordan for more than four years. He also held positions with the Pakistan Institute of Development Economics, the Council of Islamic Ideology, and the Pakistan Islamization Commission. His final appointment was as rector of the International Islamic University, Islamabad.
