= Rifa-e-Aam Club =

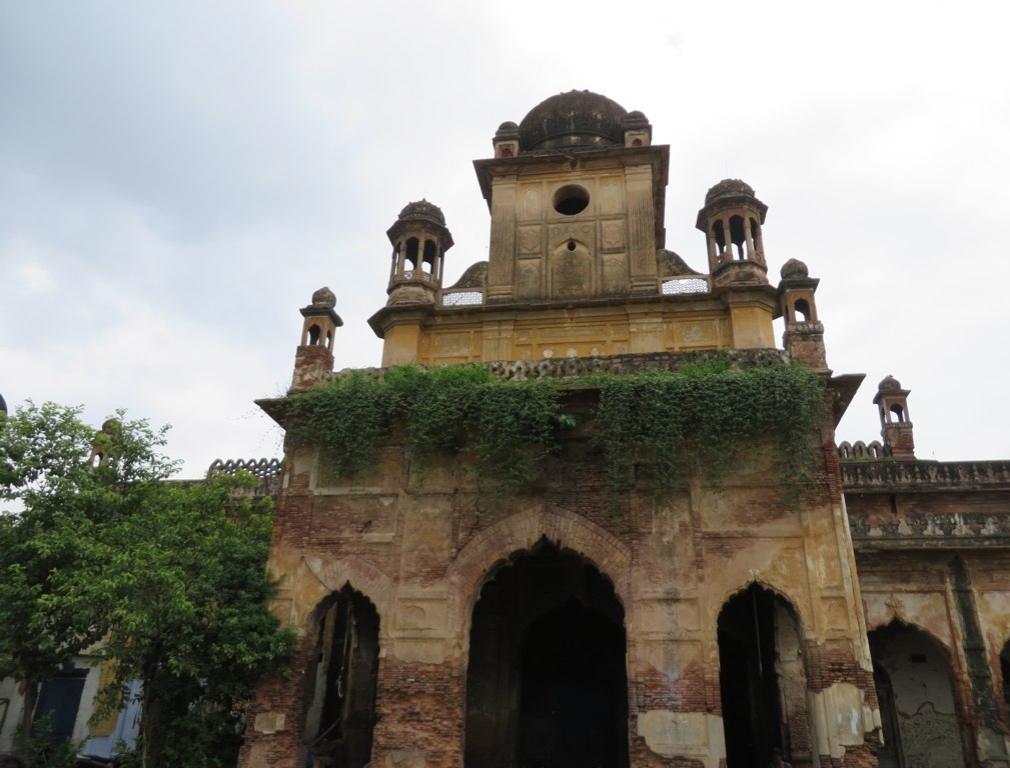
The unkempt building façade as in 2013

The Rifa-e-Aam Club (Urdu: رفاہِ عام کلب, Hindi: रिफ़ा-ए-आम क्लब) is a historic building in Lucknow, India. It is best known as the place where the Progressive Writers Movement was created.

== History ==
The building was constructed around 1860 by the Nawab of Awadh, who intended it to be a centre of the royalty's literary life in the region. According to a local historian, the name derived from "rifa" or "happiness" and "aam" or "common", and suggested that the club offered happiness to the common man. The club was open to everybody, in contrast to European clubs which did not allow Indians to apply. In subsequent years it became what The Economist described as "an important nationalist hangout". It was one of the centres of Indian nationalism and other intellectual activity, frequented by individuals such as Munshi Premchand and Mohammad Amir Ahmad Khan. In the 1900s it hosted meetings of the All-India Muslim League. The club hosted a meeting of the Indian National Congress and the Muslim League which led to the Lucknow Pact of 1916, which was also signed on the premises. Mahatma Gandhi visited the building to give a speech on Hindu-Muslim unity on 15 October 1920 and on 26 April 1922 Jawaharlal Nehru and Vallabhbhai Patel made speeches at the club encouraging local people to intensify the Swadeshi movement. The Progressive Writers Movement was created on 10 April 1936.

The building has not been well maintained in the decades since; one wing has become a hospital, another has been abandoned, and the courtyard is a rubbish dump. The poor state of the building has led to local activism trying to get it recognized and protected as a heritage landmark by the government.
