= Sibte Hassan =

Syed Sibte Hasan (Urdu: سید سبط حسن) (31 July 1916 – 20 April 1986) was an eminent scholar, journalist and political activist of Pakistan. He is regarded as one of the pioneers of Socialism and Marxism in Pakistan, as well as the moving spirit behind the Progressive Writers Association.

== Life ==
Sibte Hassan was born on 31 July 1916 in Kushaha, Ambari, Azamgarh, Uttar Pradesh, in British India. During his college days, his teachers included Amarnath Jha and Firaq Gorakhpuri, both of whom would end up among India's greatest intellectuals and recipients of the Padma Bhushan, the third-highest civilian award in the country. He graduated from Aligarh Muslim University. For higher studies, he went to Columbia University, US. In 1942, Sibte Hasan joined the Communist Party of India. After the partition of India, he migrated to Lahore, Pakistan in 1948. He also served as editor of noted journals, including Naya Adab and Lail-o-Nehar. He died of a heart attack on 20 April 1986 in New Delhi while returning to Pakistan after attending a conference in India. He was buried in Karachi. His most remarkable work is Musa Se Marx Tak.

== Work ==
- Musa se Marx tak

For many decades, Musa se Marx Tak was the fundamental guiding texts for the activists and students of the leftist politics of Pakistan.

- Shehr-e-Nigaraan
- Mazi ke Mazar
- Pakistan main Tehzeeb ka Irtaqa

In Pakistan Main Tehzeeb ka Irtiqa, Hassan wrote on the history of Pakistani people and the country's material and economic basis. It was unlike the history that eulogises rulers and kings.

- Inqilaab-e-Iran
- Naveed-e-Fikr
- Afkaar-e-Taza

This is a book consisting of critical essays on various personalities and answers to critics on various ideas.

- Adab aur Roshan Khayali
- Sukhan dar Sukhan
- The Battle of Ideas in Pakistan
- Bhagat Singh Aur Us Ky Sathi
- Marx Aur Mashriq

In this book, he analysed the analysis of Marx and Engels on the eastern traditions and formation of society.
