= Hilal Naqvi =

- Born: Hilal Naqvi; 18 February 1950 (age 76); Rawalpindi, Punjab, Pakistan
- Occupations: Teacher, Research Scholer, Poet
- Writing career
- Genres: Research, Poetry
- Subject: Literature

Hilal Naqvi is a poet and an expert among modern elegy (marisya) writers and researchers of Risai Adab.

== Early life and education ==
Syed Hilal Raza Naqvi was born on 18 February 1950 in Rawalpindi. His father's name was Syed Muzammil Hussain Naqvi. At the age of seven, Hilal Naqvi moved to Karachi with his family and completed all of his education here. He graduated from Siraj ud Daula College, Karachi which was established by Raja Sahib Mehmood Abaad. Then he did M. A. in Urdu from Karachi University in 1973. Later, in 1985 he also gained PhD degree from Karachi University. His PhD thesis was "Twentieth century and modern Marsiya."

== Start of his career ==
Hilal Naqvi started his career in 1974. He was appointed as a lecturer of Urdu department. He has served in many colleges as Govt College Chotaki, Sindh, Siraj ud Daula College, Karachi, Govt. Islamia College, Karachi, Govt. College Gulshan e Iqbal Karachi. He also has been Head of Urdu Department in Govt College Gulshan e Iqbal Karachi. Currently, he is working as a visiting Professor of Pakistan Studies Department of Karachi University where he is playing the role of a supervisor and instructor for the students of M.A and M.Phil in Urdu. Hilal Naqvi lives in Karachi and he has visited Norway, Oslo, Canada, Arab Emirates, India and many other countries at invitation for delivering lectures at Risai Adab and reciting his Marsia Nau Tasneef.

== Poetry ==
Hilal Naqvi started his poetry with Ghazal in 1967. Later his interest expanded to other forms of poetry as well. So, basically he is a poem writer. He became famous because of adopting a new style in marsiya writing. He used the third line of stanza free from following qafia of other three lines. Hilal Naqvi is one of the very authentic poets of Jadeed Marsia Nigari. Listening the Marsiya by Josh Malih Abaadi inspired him for marsiya writing. So he wrote the first marsiya in 1970, when he was a student of B.A. He presented the marsya to Josh Malih Abadi for correction. Josh has called him his very first student in one of his letters. Dr Hilal Naqvi was also a student of Naseem Amrohvi Sahib who guided him on his journey of writing Marsiya. Dr Hilal Naqvi has also written many Ghazals, Poems, Rubayaats and free verses. He is a critic of all the literary work of Josh including his Marsiyas. He has written more than six books about Josh.

== Publications ==
1. Chashm e Num (1970)
2. Maqtal o Masha’al (1976)
3. Pas e Tareekh (1982)
4. Azaan e Maqtal (Marsias by Hilal Naqvi - 1993)
5. Beesween Sadi aur Jadeed Marsiya (Thesis for PHD - 1994)
6. Guldasta e Ather per aik nazar (1977)
7. Jadeed Marsiya ky teen maimaar (1977)
8. Imanat eGham (Baqar Imanat Khani ky Marsiyey (1982)
9. Armaghan e Naseem (1992)
10. Naseem Amrohvi ky marsiyey (2012)
11. Dr Yawer Abass ky marsiyey (2012)
12. Sabir Thariyaani ky Gujraati Qita’at
13. Josh Malih Abaadi
14. Irfanyaat e Jaush (1991/1911)
15. Josh Malih Abaadi ki nadir o ghair matbooa tehreerain (1992)
16. Josh MalihAbaadi (Fun aur Shakhshiyat - 2007)
17. Josh k Inqalabi Marsyey (2010)
18. Auraaq e Josh (2010)
19. Yaadon ki baraat ka qulmi nuskha
20. Inteqaadiyaat-i-Josh (2017)
21. Jameel Mazhari ky Marsiyey (1988)
22. Masnavi Aaab o Siraab (Jameel Mazhari - 1988)
23. Musaddas Faryaad o Jawab e Faryaad (1993)
24. Marsyey ki nayaab aawazain (2011)
25. Jadeed Bayaz e Marsiya (2012)

Another contribution of Hilal Naqvi is the launch of commendable Risai Adab which is the first of its kind. So far, 36 volumes of this magazine have been published including two dedicated magazines, "Anees and Dabeer number", each one of which is spread on 1200 pages.

Before Hilal Naqvi's work, the only poets with dedicated magazines on their names were Ghalib and Iqbal. Hilal Naqvi launched a magazine for Josh, called "Josh Shanasi" which consists of the essays and research work of and about the poet. So far, 7 volumes of his magazines have been published. It is a well-accepted fact among the critics of Josh that for all the continuous work and research Hilal Naqvi has produced related to Josh, Hilal Naqvi is considered the most authentic authority on Josh in current era.

== Reviews ==
Hilal Naqvi's very first marsiya was Maqtal o Masha’al. The academic, artistic and divine power of this work can be judged well by Ahsan Farooqi's review when he says that this musaddas (a genre of Urdu poetry in which each unit consists of 6 lines stanzas) is not only an addition in the many forms of modern poetry but like Musaddas-e-Haali, it is also a criticism of contemporary time, though such anticipation is far beyond Haali's approach but can be found in Iqbal's Musaddas as Shikwa – o – Jawaab-e-Shikwa.

Josh Malih Abadi in his work has appreciated the revolutionary and universal message that Hilal Naqvi conveys in his Marsia.

"I appreciate him for breaking the tradition in the field of Masiya writing. His work did not incite tears but awakening. For him, Hussain (AS) is not confined as a leader of any specific sect or group, but he is a guide for the whole universe."
