= Muhammad Ali Siddiqui =

Pakistani journalist (1938–2013)

- Born: 7 March 1938; Amroha, Uttar Pradesh, British India
- Died: 9 January 2013 (aged 74); Karachi, Pakistan
- Education: University of Karachi
- Writing career
- Genres: Literary critic, newspaper columnist, educationist
- Notable awards: Pride of Performance Award by the President of Pakistan in 2003
- Movement: Progressive Writers' Association

Muhammad Ali Siddiqui (7 March 1938 – 9 January 2013) was a noted scholar of Urdu literature, educationist, literary critic and newspaper columnist from Pakistan. He was widely known by his pen name Ariel in Pakistan.

== Early life and career ==
He was born on 7 March 1938 in Amroha, British India, and brought up in Karachi, Pakistan. He died on 9 January 2013 in Karachi. His family had migrated to Pakistan in 1948. He received his early education at Christian Mission School in Karachi and his master's degree in English literature from the University of Karachi in 1962. He was proficient in English, French, Hindko, Hindi, Persian, Punjabi, Sindhi, Seraiki and Urdu languages. Muhammad Ali Siddiqui completed his D.Litt degree in Pakistan Studies in 2003 after doing his PhD in the same subject in 1992. He worked at the Pakistan Studies Center of the University of Karachi.

Muhammad Ali Siddiqui was a member of many national and international organizations such as: Pakistan Writers Guild, Pakistan, Association Des Litteraire Critiques International, Paris, European Union of Writers and Scientists, Rome, International Association of Literary Critics (AILC), Stavanger, Norway, Majlis-i-Farough-i-Urdu Adab, Doha, Qatar.

Ali Siddiqui was a prominent Urdu language critic. He was also the Dean of the Faculty of Management and Social Sciences, Institute of Business and Technology, Karachi. He also served as Dean, Faculty of Education & Social Sciences at Hamdard University, Karachi for six years. He taught at Karachi University for a number of years. He served as the Director of Quaid-i-Azam Academy for six years and was the President of Progressive Writers Association in 2013 at the time of his death.

Ali Siddiqui had penned more than 100 research articles. He has 16 books to his credit, two of them Tawazun and Croce ki Sarguzasht, were adjudged as the 'Best Books of the Years' in 1976 and 1979 respectively. He used to write for the business journal Business Recorder and he wrote a column for the Dawn newspaper under the pen name Ariel for over two decades.

He had delivered lectures in many overseas universities such as the School of Oriental & American Studies London University, Carlton University, Canada, the University of Toronto, Canada, and Oslo University, Norway.

His importance as a critic has been applauded by the critics of Urdu language like Majnun Gorakhpuri, Akhtar Hussain Raipuri, Professor Mumtaz Husain, Professor Mujtaba Husain, Dr. Ali Jawwad Zaidi, Dr. Wazir Agha etc. Among the creative writers, Faiz Ahmed Faiz regarded him as the only creative critic from Pakistan, the others being Dr. Narang, Dr. Zoe Ansari usage Dr. Qamar Rais from India.

Journalist Khalid Ahmed wrote:

"Most people think Muzaffar Ali Syed was the most learned man in Pakistan. Among the living, Muhammad Ali Siddiqui or Ariel of Dawn is undoubtedly the most learned man. He holds his own compared with the late Syed who created waves more often by being controversial. Not that Siddiqui is non-controversial. His assessments of Sir Syed Ahmad Khan and Allama Iqbal have been heretical but have escaped attention because his scholarship is unassailable and we generally don't like reading controversial things if they are deeply scholarly. If you can't face a critic, ignore him".

== Books ==
- Tawazun (A Book of Critical Writing) (1976)
- Croce Ki Sarguzasht (Translation of Bendetto Croce, Autotrigraphy) (1976)
- Nishanat (A Collection of Critical Writings) (1981)
- Pakistaniat(Vol.1), Edited with Dr. H.M.Jafri (1989)
- Mazameem (A Book of Critical Writings) (1991)
- Isharye (Collection of Critical Writings) (1994)
- Quaid-i-Azam: A Chronology (Urdu) – Published by Quaid-i-Azam Academy, Karachi
- Quaid-i-Azam: A Chronology (English) – Published by Quaid-i-Azam Academy, Karachi
- Quaid-i-Azam: Speeches (English) – Published by Quaid-i-Azam Academy, Karachi
- Quaid-i-Azam: Urdu Adibon Ki Nazar Mein (Urdu) – Published by Quaid-i-Azam Academy, Karachi
- Zikr-i-Quaid-i-Azam (Urdu) – Published by Quaid-i-Azam Academy, Karachi
- Talash-i-Iqbal (Urdu) (2002)
- Sir Syed Ahmed Khan Aur Jiddat Pasandi (Urdu) Karachi (2003)
- Sir Syed Ahmed Khan Aur Jiddat Pasandi (Urdu) 2nd Edition Karachi (2004)
- Mutalea-i-Josh Malihabadi (Urdu) Karachi (2005)
- Ghalib Aur Aaj Ka Shaoor – Idara-i-Yaadgar-i-Ghalib, Karachi (2005)
- Idrak (A Collection of Critical Writings), Karachi (2007)

== Awards and recognition ==
- Pride of Performance Award by the President of Pakistan in 2003
- Canadian Association of South Asian Studies, 'scholar of the year' award in 1984

== See also ==
- Quaid-i-Azam Academy
