= Salma Siddiqui =

Indian novelist (1931-2017)

Salma Siddiqui (18 June 1931 – 13 February 2017) was an Indian novelist in the Urdu language and a prominent member of the Progressive Writers' Movement.

== Biography ==
Salma Siddiqui was born in 1931 in Varanasi. Her father Rasheed Ahmad Siddiqui was an educationist and professor. She studied Urdu at Aligarh Muslim University, earning a master's degree; she later taught at Women's College, Aligarh Muslim University.

Her first marriage ended early, and in 1957, she married Krishan Chander in Nainital. They settled in Bombay in 1962.

== Family ==
Kausar Munir, a lyricist and poet known for the songs in the Hindi film Ishaqzaade is Siddiqui's granddaughter. Siddiqui died on 13 February 2017, aged 85.

== Literary career ==
In Siddiqui's father's household in Aligarh was a family retainer named Sikander. He was an idiosyncratic personality, and his stories formed the basis of Siddiqui's novel Sikandarnama. A television serialisation of the novel, Karname Sikandar ke, was broadcast by Doordarshan in 1991.

Other works Siddiqui is known for are Gilhari ki Behen, Bharosa and Mangal Sutra. Several of her completed manuscripts were destroyed in a monsoon shower, following which Siddiqui didn't publish again.

== Bibliography ==
- Sikandarnama. Delhi: Punjabi Pustak Bhandar.
