= Firaq Gorakhpuri: The Poet of Pain & Ecstasy =

2015 book

- Authors: Ajai Mansingh, Gopi Chand Narang
- Language: English
- Genre: Biography
- Published: 2015
- Publisher: Roli Books
- Publication place: India
- Pages: 249
- ISBN: 978-8-174-36922-2

Firaq Gorakhpuri: The Poet of Pain & Ecstasy is a book about Firaq Gorakhpuri, an Indian Urdu poet, co-authored by Ajai Mansingh and Gopi Chand Narang. It was published by Lotus Collection under Roli Books in 2015. This book is known as the first biography of Gorakhpuri.
