= Josh Malihabadi =

Pakistani poet (1898–1982)

Josh Malihabadi HI PB
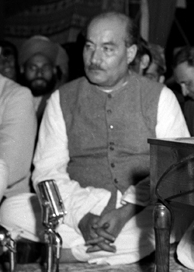
- Josh (1949)
- Born: Shabbir Hasan Khan; 5 December 1898; Malihabad, North-Western Provinces, British India
- Died: 22 February 1982 (aged 83); Islamabad, Pakistan
- Education: Visva-Bharati University
- Occupation: Poet
- Writing career
- Notable awards: Padma Bhushan (1954) by the Government of India; Hilal-e-Imtiaz (2013) by the President of Pakistan
- Movement: Progressive Writers' Movement
- Other name: Shayar-e-Inquilab

Josh Malihabadi (born Shabbir Hasan Khan; 5 December 1898 – 22 February 1982) popularly known as Shayar-e-Inqalab (poet of revolution) was a Pakistani Urdu poet.

Known for his liberal values and challenging the established order, he wrote over 100,000 couplets and more than 1,000 rubaiyat in his lifetime. Yaadon ki Barat, his autobiography, is noted for its frank and candid style. The first Prime Minister of India, Jawaharlal Nehru held him in high esteem and frequently attended the mushaira at Lala Kishan Lal Kalra's United Coffee House where Josh recited his poetry.

Some of his works were translated to English like The Unity of Mankind elegies by Josh Malihabadi by Syed Akbar Pasha Tirmizi.

== Early life ==
Josh was born to an Urdu-speaking Muslim family of Afridi Pashtun origin in Malihabad (13 miles from Lucknow), United Provinces, British India. He received early education in Arabic, Persian, Urdu and English at his home. He studied at St Peter's College, Agra and passed his Senior Cambridge examination in 1914. Subsequently, he studied Arabic and Persian and, in 1918, spent six months at Tagore's university at Shantiniketan. The death of his father, Bashir Ahmed Khan, in 1916, prevented him from undertaking a college education.

His family had a long tradition of producing men of letters. His great-grandfather, Nawab Faqeer Muhammad Khan ‘Goya’; his grandfather, Nawab Muhammad Ahmad Khan; his paternal uncle, Ameer Ahmad Khan; and his father, Basheer Ahmad Khan, were all poets with numerous works, including poetry collections, translations, and essays. Another of his relative was the journalist, scholar and Abul Kalam Azad's confidant, Abdur Razzaq Malihabadi.

== Career ==
In 1925, Josh started to supervise translation work at Osmania University in the princely state of Hyderabad. However, his stay there ended when he found himself exiled for writing a nazm against the Nizam of Hyderabad, the then ruler of the state.

Soon thereafter, he founded the magazine Kaleem (literally, "speaker" in Urdu), in which he wrote articles in favour of independence from the British Raj in India. His poem Hussain aur Inquilab (Hussain and Revolution) won him the title of Shaair-e-Inquilaab (Poet of the Revolution). Subsequently, he became more actively involved in the freedom struggle (albeit, in an intellectual capacity) and became close to some of the political leaders of that era, especially Jawaharlal Nehru (later to be the first Prime Minister of independent India).

After the end of the British Raj in India in 1947, Josh became the editor of the publication Aaj-Kal.

== Josh in Pakistan ==
Josh migrated to Pakistan in 1956 – despite Jawaharlal Nehru's insistence against it – over what is generally believed to be his concern regarding the future of Josh and Urdu language in India, where he thought the Hindu majority would encourage the use of Hindi rather than Urdu. After migration, Josh settled in Karachi and worked for Anjuman-i-Tarraqi-i-Urdu.

== Death and legacy ==
Josh remained in Pakistan until he died on 22 February 1982 in Islamabad. Mustafa Zaidi, Faiz Ahmad Faiz and Syed Fakhruddin Balley were the closest companions and friends of Josh and Sajjad Hyder Kharosh (son of Josh). Faiz Ahmad Faiz visited Islamabad during his illness and Syed Fakhruddin Balley remained entirely engaged with Josh and Sajjad Hyder Kharosh. Poet Faiz, who coincidentally landed in Pakistan on 22 February 1982 after a long self-imposed exile to meet General Zia Ul-Haq, the then military ruler of Pakistan, and complained to him for not attending Joautobiographyuneral.'

Professor Ehtesham Hussain was the first eminent figure who started working on Josh's biography, with his implied consent. He was in the early stages of his work, when suddenly Josh migrated to Pakistan. It's evident that the scholar Ehtesham lost his passion and never completed the work. Professor Mohammad Hassan, a promi ent scholar of Ehtesham's lineage, then wrote a nearly 100 page epilogue on Josh in 1987, that will soon be published by JLSC, Calgary. Hilal Naqvi, eminent poet and researcher almost devoted his entire life in gathering and publishing Josh's work. The list of Josh's admirers are so long and over a span of nearly 100 years, but the most prominent contributors and writers amongst them include, professor Ehtesham Hussain, Rais Amrohvi, Mustafa Zaidi, Sehba Luckhnavi, Professor Qamar Raes, Ali Sardar, Professor Mumtaz Hussain, Ali Ahmed Fatmi, Shahid Mahuli of Ghalib Institute, Delhi, India, Professor Sahar Ansari, Rahat Saeed, Jaun Elia, Muhammad Ali Siddiqui, Professor Hasan Abid, Jaffar Ahmed, Parvin Shakir, Iqbal Haider, Shaista Rizvi.

Josh's maternal grandson Farrukh Jamal Malihabadi, granddaughter Tabassum Akhlaq has also carried over the legacy of his poetry. Presently, artist Fahim Hamid Ali is working on a presentation of Josh.

Josh Literary Society of Canada (JLSC) was formed by Iqbal Haider, Arshad Vasti, Shaista Rizvi, Naheed Kazmi, Nighat Haider, Hasan Zaheer, Aqeel Athar, Alim Ghaznavi, Abdul Qavi Zia and others in February 1983 in Calgary, Canada.

JLSC convened its first literary conference in Calgary in February 1986 under the title of Josh – The Poet of the Century, with a keynote article by the eminent scholar Professor Mumtaz Hussain.

Then Josh Society and Irteqa Foundation of Karachi together commemorated Josh Centennial a 3-day, mega literary event in Karachi, followed up by other one day programs in Delhi, Allahabad, Lucknow, Lahore, Hyderabad and Dubai. Josh Literary Society has published and reprinted 14 books on Josh. JLSC has also convened and celebrated many other Centennials or seminars like Firaq Gorakhpuri, Majaz Lucknawi, Mustafa Zaidi, Juan Elia, Saadat Hasan Manto, Rashid, Faiz Ahmed Faiz and Ismat Chughtai.

The Josh Memorial Committee was formed in 1986 by Tabassum Akhlaq and she is the current chairperson. The committee organises seminars on Josh Malihabadi's personality, history and literary work. These seminars are usually held on his birthday and death anniversary (on 5 December and 22 February respectively).

In August 2012, the Government of Pakistan announced Hilal-i-Imtiaz for Josh Malihabadi. This award was presented to his granddaughter and founding chairperson of Josh Memorial Committee, Tabassum Akhlaq by the President of Pakistan, Asif Ali Zardari in a ceremony held in the Presidency on Pakistan Day 23 March 2013.

The lifelong mission of Josh can be summed up in his own words:

Kaam hai mera taghayyur, Naam hai mera shabaab
Mera naara: inquilab-o-inquilab-o-inquilab

My task is change, my name is youth!
My slogan: revolution, revolution and revolution!

A noted scholar and literary critic of Pakistan Pervez Hoodbhoy is quoted as saying about his poetry, "Poetry flowed from Josh's pen like water from a bubbling spring."

== Works ==
These include:

- Aawaz-e-Haq (1921)
- Shola-o-Shabnam
- Junoon-o-Hikmat
- Fikr-o-Nishaat (1937) and (1969)
- Sunbal-o-Salaasal
- Harf-o-Hikaayat
- Sarod-o-Kharosh
- Rooh-e-Adab
- Aayat-o-Naghmaat (1941)
- Arsh-o-Farsh (1944) and (1973)
- Saif-o-Subu
- Sumoom-o-Saba
- Tulu-e-fikr
- Qatra-o-Qulzum
- Nujoom-o-Jawahar
- Mauja-e-Fikr
- Auraaq-e-Sahar
- Ilhaam-o-Maqalaat-e-zarreen
- Nawaredaat-e-Josh
- Irfaniyat-e-Josh
- Yaadon Ki Baraat (autobiography)

Song	Singers	Film and year
Ae Watan Hum Hain Teri Shama Ke Parwanaun Mein	Masood Rana and Ahmed Rushdi	Aag Ka Darya (1966)
Hawa Se Moti Baras Rahein Hain, Faza Tarane Suna Rahi Hai	Noor Jehan	Aag Ka Darya (1966 film)

On the advice of film director W. Z. Ahmed, Malihabadi also wrote songs for Shalimar Pictures. One of the films is Aag Ka Darya (1966) with music by Ghulam Nabi and Abdul Latif.

== Honours and awards ==
- Padma Bhushan Award, India's third highest civilian honour in 1954.
- The Title of "The Poet of the Century" was given by the "QAFLA-PERA'O" Lahore, announced by the QAFLA_SALAR Syed Fakhruddin Balley, Jawaid Ahmad Qureshi, Wazir Agha, Ahmad Nadeem Qasmi and Ashfaq Ahmad, in 1992.
- Kamal-e-Sukhan Award was announced for Hazrat Josh Mallihabadi by The Old Boys Association EMERSON College, Multan in 1999.
- Hilal-e-Imtiaz (Crescent of Excellence) Pakistan's second highest civilian honor on 23 March 2013.
- Ali Sardar Jafri captured Josh's biography in a serial named Kahkashan aired on DD National
