= Majnun Gorakhpuri =

Indian-born Pakistani Urdu poet and writer (1904–1988)

Majnoon Gorakhpuri
- Born: Ahmad Siddiq; 10 May 1904; Gorakhpur, British India
- Died: 4 June 1988 (aged 84); Karachi, Pakistan
- Education: Allahabad University (BA); University of Calcutta (MA)
- Occupations: Writer, Poet literary critic
- Years active: 1921–1988
- Known for: Inspired many writers in Progressive Writers' Movement
- Notable work: Adab Aur Zindagi (his book)

Ahmad Siddiq, better known by his pen name Majnun Gorakhpuri (Urdu:احمد صدیق مجنوں گورکھپوری), (10 May 1904 – 4 June 1988) was an Urdu short story (Afsana) writer, poet and literary critic.

== Life ==
Ahmad Siddiq, known as Majnun Gorakhpuri, was born on 10 May 1904 in Gorakhpur, Uttar Pradesh (then United Provinces). His father was Muhammed Farooq Devana Gorakhpuri who used to teach at Aligarh Muslim University as a professor and also used to write a newspaper column in Maulana Muhammad Ali Jauhar's newspaper Hamdard.

His friend Firaq Gorakhpuri also hailed from Gorakhpur and was now settled in Allahabad. Firaq himself recalls, "Majnun Gorakhpuri came to Allahabad those days and got admitted to a college. He was staying with me and his company dispelled my loneliness a little". He added: "In those days I used to spend a good deal of my time in the company of Majnun Gorakhpuri and Munshi Premchand. Their company helped to awaken my poetic instincts and kindle my thoughts".

Majnun Gorakhpuri then became associated with the Progressive Writers Movement since its inception. Other notable short story writers like Ismat Chughtai and Saadat Hasan Manto also took inspiration from him. Ismat Chughtai once admitted publicly and acknowledged that she used to practice short story writing by emulating Majnun Gorakhpuri's style, before she actually started her own literary career. Majnun Gorakhpuri himself was inspired by the writings of noted writer Niaz Fatehpuri (1884–1966).

== Education ==
Majnun Gorakhpuri's early education took place in Gorakhpur, and he went to Allahabad University for higher education. He earned his MA in English degree from Agra University and thereafter earned an MA in Urdu degree from the University of Calcutta.

== Academic career ==
Majnun Gorakhpuri taught at different colleges and universities throughout his life including Aligarh Muslim University, Gorakhpur University and the University of Karachi. He taught in the Department of Urdu at Aligarh Muslim University. He migrated to Pakistan in 1967 and went on to live in Karachi and taught at Karachi University till his last years of life.

== Literary work and contribution ==
Besides his collection of short stories, Majnun Gorakhpuri wrote over 25 books on Urdu literature.

Literary Criticism

Adab aur zindagi: Majnun Gorakhpuri ki chand tanqidat ka majmu'ah, tarmim-o-izafah ke sath (1944)

Iqbal: Ijmali tabsirah (1945)

Tanqidi hashiye: Tanqidi mazamin ka majmu'ah (1945)

Nuqūsh-O-Afkār (1955)

Sher Aur Ghaazal (1962)

Adab Aur Zindagī; Majnoon, Ahmad Siddiq (1964)

Ghazal Sara (1964)

Ghālib : Shakhs Aur Shāir, (Karāchī : Maktabah-i Arbāb-i Qalam, 1974)

Armaghān-I-Majnūn (1980, 1984)

Jamaliat (aesthetics)

Masnavi-i-Zahr-i ishq, Mirza Shauq : tabsire by Majnun Gorakhpuri and Mohsin Faruqi; (digar rumani dastanen, Mohsin Faruqi tazkirah va tanqid) Criticism and interpretation on Zahr-i-ishq, poetical work written in 1855 by Mirzā Shauq; includes criticism on different folk tales by Mohsin Fārūqī.

Pardesi ke Khutut

Collections of Short stories

- Saman posh (1934)
- Zaidi Ka Hashr
- Khvab-o-khayal aur dusare afsane (1943)
- Saman posh aur dusre afsane, jin ka ta'alluq ruhaniyat se hai (1971)

Translations:

- King Lear by William Shakespeare (Urdu)
- Shamshoun Mubariz (Samson Agonistes by John Milton)

He also edited 'Aivan' literary journal/magazine from Gorakhpur 1931-35.

== Awards and recognition ==
- He was a winner of Tamgha-i-Imtiaz (Medal of Distinction) in Pakistan which he accepted reluctantly from President General Zia Ul-Haq.

== Suggested readings ==
Majnoon Gorakhpuri-Life and Art by Abdul Sattar Niazi

Armughan-E-Majnoon Vol I (Majnoon Academy Karachi)

Armughan-E-Majnoon Vol II (Majnoon Academy Karachi)
