= Khatir Ghaznavi =

Pakistani writer and poet (1925–2008)

- خاطر غزنوی; K̲h̲āt̤ir G̲h̲aznavī
- Khatir Ghaznavi / Muhammad Ibrahim Baig
- Born: Muhammad Ibrahim Baig; 5 November 1925; Peshawar, British India
- Died: 7 July 2008 (aged 82); Peshawar, Pakistan
- Resting place: Peshawar
- Citizenship: Pakistani
- Education: Urdu (M.A.)
- Alma mater: University of Peshawar
- Occupations: Writer; Poet; Scholar; Playwright
- Writing career
- Language: Urdu, Hindko, Pashto
- Years active: 19xx–2016
- Genres: Gazal, Nazm
- Subjects: Literature, spoken language, language arts
- Notable awards: Pride of Performance (1999)
- Known for: Khwab Dar Khwab (Dream By Dream) (Poetry); Pakistan Mein Urdu (Urdu in Pakistan) (Research)
- Notable work: Pakistan Academy of Letters (Director); Progressive Writers' Association (Vice president); University of Peshawar (Chairperson)

Muhammad Ibrahim Baig (Note: Urdu: محمد ابراہیم بیگ) (5 November 1925 – 7 July 2008), known by his pen name Khatir Ghaznavi; (Note: Urdu: خاطر غزنوی, K̲h̲āt̤ir G̲h̲aznavī) was a Pakistani multilingual writer, poet, playwright, research scholar, and director of Pakistan Academy of Letters. He wrote around fifty books, including poems and children's books in Urdu, Hindko and Pashto languages, though most of his published literary work is in Urdu and Hindko.

He is sometimes referred to as researcher, linguist, columnist, educationist, and is also credited for conducting an extensive research on Hindko and Urdu literature. (Note: He was also referred to as lyricist, translator, critic, dramatist, linguist, prose-writer, and broadcaster) He is often recognized one of the prominent writers in Pashto literatures. The government of Pakistan later awarded him the Presidential Pride of Performance award in 1999 in recognition of his contribution to the country's literature.

== Life and background ==
Ghaznavi was born as Muhammad Ibrahim Baig to an Afghan family in one of the ethnic groups of Afghanistan. His family originally belonged to central Afghanistan of Ghazni, and later migrated to Peshawar where he was born and raised. He had four daughters and three sons.

He did his primary schooling in Bannu and secondary education in Peshawar, and later attended the University of Peshawar in 1958 from where he did his master's degree in Urdu. After completing his university education, he joined the same university and served as a lecture at Urdu faculty. He was then promoted to professor and later chairman. He did diploma in foreign languages such as Malay and later Chinese language which he obtained in 1965. He learnt local and foreign spoken languages, including Urdu, Pashto, Hindko, English, Persian, Chinese, Malay and Russian languages, which he used throughout his career, however he primarily used local ones while writing books. As an editor, he actively wrote columns while working at various magazines and newspapers, including national ones.

He served director of a research foundation Pakistan Academy of Letters (PAL) at Islamabad where he was involved in scholarly research with national academy. He was actively involved with literary organizations and tertiary institutions and served vice president of the Progressive Writers' Association for North-West Frontier Province (now Khyber Pakhtunkhwa) and chairperson of the University of Peshawar for Urdu department.

During his initial or later career, he worked as a photographer and had photographed a large number of historical photos of the Pakistan Movement, which were later published by a research institute of Peshawar Gandhara Hindko Board (GHB) in its daily Indo-Aryan linguistic cultural-based publication titled "Hindkowan". (Note: See Hindkowans for related information)

== Literary career ==
Ghaznavi started his career as a clerk at All India Radio, and was subsequently given Radio producer and then programme organizer designation during his seven years service. Between 1942 and 1962, he served as a producer at Radio Pakistan, including at its domestic service branches such as Peshawar and Rawalpindi. He also taught abroad and went to Malaysia, where he was assigned to write a "dictionary of common words" in specified languages such as Urdu and Malay. The dictionary, which is not-known was later published by the Government of Malaysia. He served head of the department (HOD) at the University of Malaya for Pakistan studies and Urdu department. He is also credited for introducing the Department of Chinese at the University of Peshawar.

He wrote his first novel at the time when he was studying in a school. He wrote about forty five books, including poetry. All of his poetic books published in Hindko language are collectively known as "Koonjan". He is also credited for translating Khushal Khattak's poetry into Urdu or Hindko. His poetry Khwab Dar Khwab is recognized one of the prominent books among his other writings. He wrote a book on Hindko that covers geography and its history. The book was later published by the National Language Promotion Department in 2003.

=== Urdu research ===
Ghaznavi played a significant role in Urdu language development besides Pashto and Hindko. His contribution was recognized by the government on national level. However, his research into Urdu literature is sometimes considered "unorthodox". He wrote a book titled Urdu Zaban Ka Makhaz Hindko (Urdu language's source Hindko), which was later published in 2003 by the National Language Authority, claimed both Urdu and Hindi languages are etymologically associated with Hindko as their source or origin. His dialectical research was declined by its native speakers citing "Hindko language is a dialect of western Punjabi", making it geographically a distinct one.

=== Publications ===
Key
†	Remarks denote a short description of the work where available.

#	Title	Year	Type/Credited as	Remarks
1	Phool aur Pathar (Rose and stone)	—N/a	Novel	—N/a
2	Chattan aur Romaan	—N/a	Pakistani folklore	—N/a
3	Sarhad ki Romaanvi Kahaniyan (Romantic stories of outskirts)	—N/a	Folktale	—N/a
4	Khwab Dar Khwab (Dream By Dream)	—N/a	Poetry	—N/a
5	Saanp Ki Chatri (Snake Umbrella)	—N/a	Poetry	It was his last book with Urdu poetry
6	Khushal Khan Khattak Ki Shayri (Poetry of Khushal Khan)	—N/a	Translator	The writer translated the book into Urdu or Hindko language.
7	Dastar Nama	—N/a	Translator	Book translation into Urdu
8	Khushal Nama	—N/a	Translator	Book translation into Urdu or Hindko
9	Raqs Nama	—N/a	Translator	—N/a
10	Zindagi Ke Liay (For Life)	—N/a	Play	—N/a
11	Manzal Ba Manzal	—N/a	Play	—N/a
12	Pakistan Mein Urdu (Urdu in Pakistan)	—N/a	Research	Extensive research of Urdu literature
13	Khayban-e-Urdu	—N/a	Research	—N/a
14	Jadeed Urdu Adab (Modern Urdu Literature)	—N/a	Research	The writer conducted a research of modern Urdu literature in Pakistan
15	Jadeed Urdu Nazm (Modern Urdu [lNazm)	—N/a	Research	The research include modern Nazms in Pakistan
16	Urdu Zaban Ka Makhaz Hindko (Urdu language's source Hindko)	2003	Research	The research include relations between Urdu and Hindi languages with Hindko

=== Academic donation ===
During his last days, he donated his all publications, including poetry, research and manuscripts, to the University of Peshawar where his books are preserved in a library.

== Awards and honors ==
- Pride of Performance Award by the President of Pakistan in 1999.

== Death ==
Ghaznavi spent his last days in extreme difficult situation due to his aging, financial crisis, and eventually with deteriorated health. He was suffering from multiple ailments and was subsequently admitted to a hospital in Karachi for medical treatment and died there on 7 July 2008. He is buried in a cemetery in Peshawar.

== Bibliography ==
- g̲h̲Aznavī, K̲h̲āt̤ir (1977). Phūl aur patthar: Nāvilaṭ. Kitāb Kār. p. 88.
- g̲h̲Aznavī, K̲h̲āt̤ir (1979). Rup rang: Ürdu poetry. University Book Agency. p. 128.
- Sarhad ki rumani kahaniyan: Compiled and translated by Khatir Ghaznavi. Lokversa. 1985.
- g̲h̲Aznavī, K̲h̲āt̤ir (1985). K̲h̲vāb dar k̲h̲vāb. Sang-i Mīl Pablīkeshanz. p. 192.
- g̲h̲Aznavī, K̲h̲āt̤ir (2001). ايک كمره: ايک كمرے كا خاكه، ايک جاكوں بھرا خاكه. سنڈيكيٹ آف رائٹرز. p. 176.
