= Jagdish Gupt =

Indian poet

Jagdish Gupt (1924–2001) was an Indian poet of the Nayi kavita generation, a period of modernism in modern Indian Hindi poetry. He also wrote poetry in the Braj language. He was Chairman of the Department of Hindi at Allahabad University.

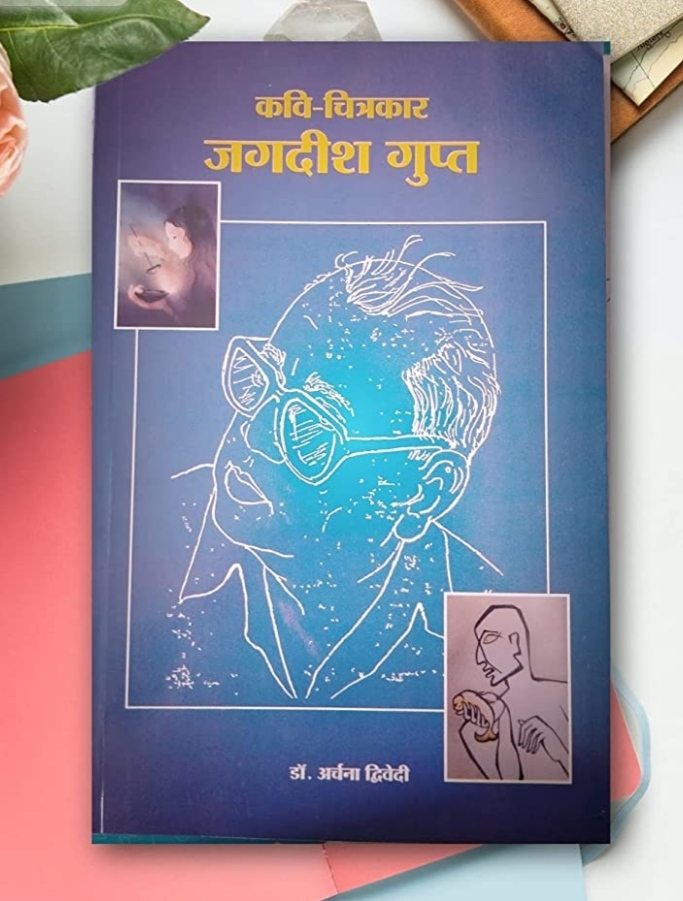
