= Tabassum Akhlaq =

Pakistani writer

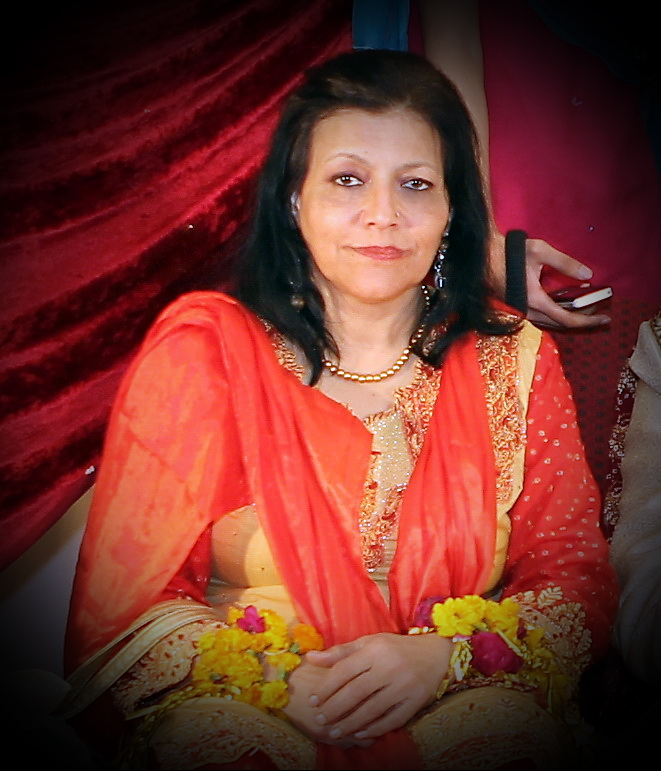
- Akhlaq, in Peshawar, Pakistan, 2012
- Born: Tabassum Afridi; 19 May 1964 (age 62); Karachi, Sindh, Pakistan
- Citizenship: Pakistani
- Education: F.G College, F-7/2, Islamabad, Pakistan
- Occupation: Poet
- Spouse: Akhlaq Ahmad Malik
- Children: Sikkandar Ali Sana Malik Bad-e-Sahar Sanobar Akhlaq
- Relatives: Josh Malihabadi (Grand-Father)
- Writing career
- Genres: Ghazal; Free verse

Tabassum Akhlaq (also known as Tabassum Afridi and Tabassum Akhlaq Malihabadi, born 19 May 1964) is a poet, writer, columnist and event organiser from Pakistan. She is the granddaughter of Josh Malihabadi and the founding chairperson of Josh Memorial Committee.

== Early life ==
She was born as Tabassum Afridi to Sajjad Haider Kharosh and Anwar Begum on 19 May 1964 in Karachi, Pakistan. Her father was the only son of the revolutionary Urdu poet, Josh Malihabadi while her mother was the daughter of a former Minister to the Nawab of the princely state of Junagadh. After her grandfather was blacklisted by the then President of Pakistan, Ayub Khan, the business of her father was sealed and all assets confiscated.

.During this time of turmoil, her father went through a nervous breakdown and her mother went schizophrenic, leaving the responsibility of her education and upbringing of her younger brother to her elder brother and two elder sisters. She completed her primary education at Pakistan Model School, Karachi.

In 1973, her family moved to Islamabad to live with Josh Malihabadi. There, she enrolled in F.G. College, F-7/2, for secondary education. While living in Islamabad, she became influenced by the poetry of her grandfather, Josh Malihabadi. She started writing free verse poetry at the early age of 12. During that time, literary gatherings were held on a regular basis at her residence. She regularly attended these gathering (Urdu: مشاعره) and as a result of the influences, she slowly developed her own writing style and gradually developed into a mature poet. She participated in and won various poetry and prose competitions in her college. She completed her graduation (BA Urdu and History) from F.G. College, F-7/2, Islamabad in 1982.

== Personal life ==
She married Akhlaq Ahmad Malik, an entrepreneur and government supplier, on 29 April 1984. She relocated to Rawalpindi after marriage and has four children.

== Josh Memorial Committee ==
Her grandfather, Josh Malihabadi died on 22 February 1982 in Islamabad after prolonged illness. After his death, Tabassum Akhlaq assumed the responsibility to carry his literary legacy. She founded the Josh Memorial Committee on 10 January 1987 along with Maulana Kausar Niazi, Zia Jalandhari, Dr. Inaam-ul-Haq Javed, Ghazanfar Mehdi, Farrukh Jamal, Syed Arif, Shams Rizwi, Maqsood Jafri and various others. Kausar Niazi was the first chairman of the committee. The committee was formed to organise seminars and conferences on the life, personality, history and literary work of Josh Malihabadi.

After the death of Kausar Niazi in 1994, Akhlaq became the chairperson of Josh Memorial Committee. Under her leadership, the committee continues to operate at national level and organises seminars bi-annually on the birthday (5 December) and death anniversary (22 February) of Josh Malihabadi.

== Contributions to Urdu literature ==
Tabassum Akhlaq is an active poet, speaker and columnist in domestic, national and international events. Romance, religion, solitude and peace are the major themes of her poetry. Four of her poetry books are in the stage of either printing, publishing, proofreading or composing. She is also working on a biography of Josh Malihabadi and a compilation of her columns.

In August 2012, the Government of Pakistan announced Hilal-e-Imtiaz for Josh Malihabadi. The award was presented to Tabassum Akhlaq on 23 March 2013.
