= Rasheed Ahmad Siddiqui =

Urdu language writer (1892-1977)

- Born: 24 December 1892; Mariyahu, North-Western Provinces, British India
- Died: 15 January 1977 (aged 84); Aligarh
- Children: Salma Siddiqui

Philosophical work
- Era: 20th century
- Main interests: Literature, humour, satire

Signature
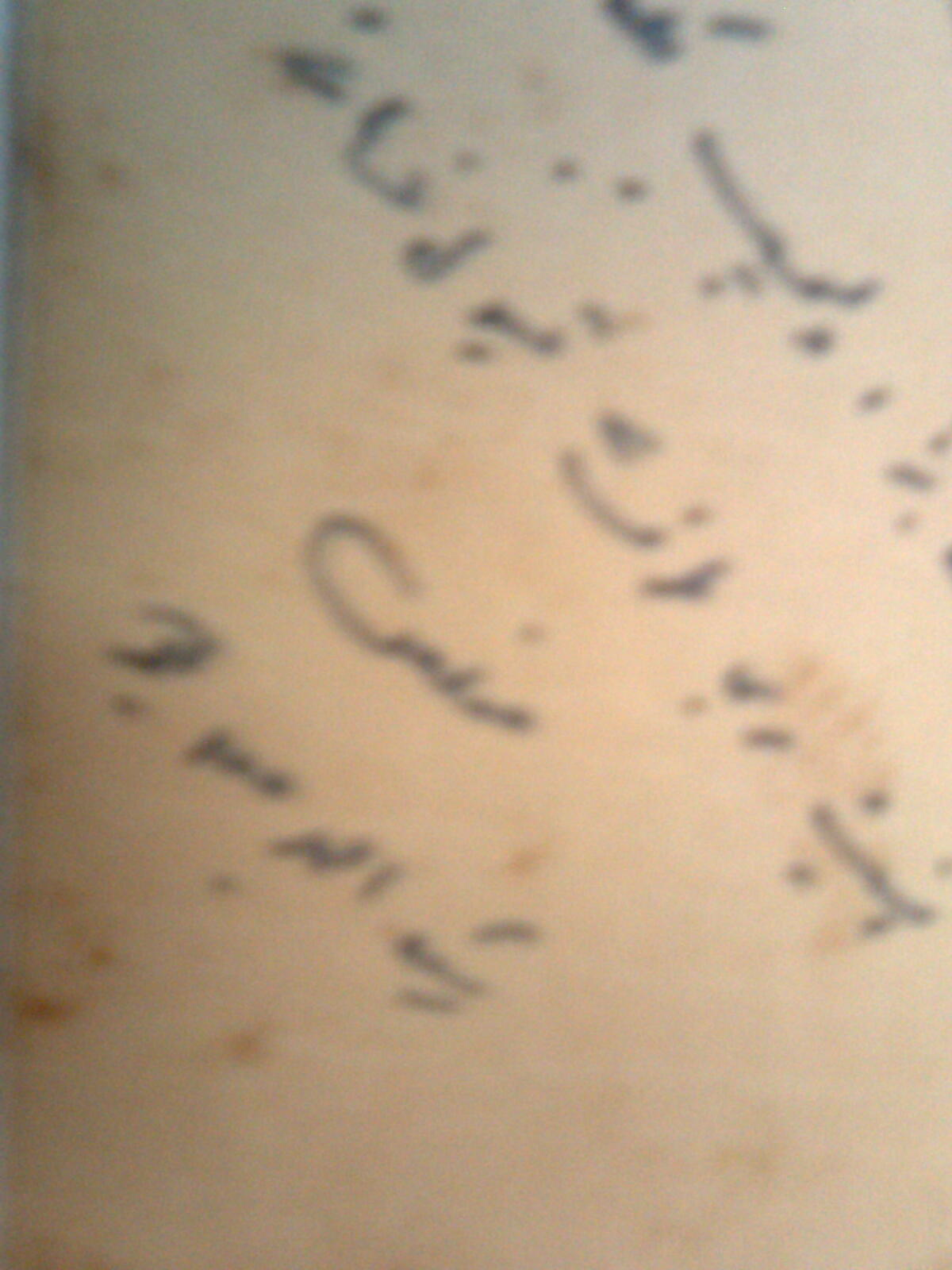

Rasheed Ahmad Siddiqui (1892–1977) was a noted Urdu writer and a professor at Aligarh Muslim University in India.

== Literary life and style ==
Rasheed Ahmad Siddiqui was born in 1892 in Mariyahu, Jaunpur in Uttar Pradesh. He was one of the most distinguished Urdu writers of the 20th century, known for his unique style of expressing himself in speech as well as in his writings. He was not only a satirist and a humorist, but also a critic, a biographer, a writer of life-sketches and an accomplished essayist.

Noted for his mild satire and humour, impressionistic criticism, a lively style of expression and an eye and feeling for the right word, he has few equals in Urdu literature. He has been called a visionary with a solution in academic circles. Two short extracts from an article published on 13 October 2002 in Dawn, Pakistan's leading English-language daily newspaper, reflect the consensus view on Siddiqui in the academic world:

Rasheed Ahmad Siddiqui is regarded as a major writer of Urdu prose. His sensitivity to the major issues of the subcontinent was remarkable. It was natural for him, being a descendant of Sir Syed Ahmed Khan, to be so concerned about the plight of the Indian Muslims. Prof Rasheed Ahmed Siddiqui was a liberal and progressive critic. He fervently believed that the Aligarh spirit didn't allow one to stoop low to flout the fundamental norms of decency and propriety. It is only when he is defending the Indo-Muslim culture and its contribution to the Indian culture as a whole that he would appear to be partisan.

== Aligarh ==
Any study of his writings without keeping in mind the scholarly, literary and cultural ambiance of Aligarh Muslim University and the city of Aligarh would make little sense. Most of the themes, events and characters in his works are, in one way or another, related to Aligarh but one also catches glimpses of Mariyahu, his place of birth. However, Aligarh is invariably the main source of his inspiration and creativity.

== Sahitya Akademi Award ==
He received the 1971 Sahitya Akademi Urdu Award for his book "Ghalib ki Shakhsiyat aur Sha'airi" (lit. "Ghalib's Personality and Poetry").

== Literary works ==
- Mazameen-e-Rasheed
- Khundaan
- Ashufta Bayaani meri.
- Ghalib ki Shakhsiyat aur Sha'airi
- Ganj Haye Giran maaya
- Hum Nafsan e Raftah
- Iqbal ki Shaksiyat aur Sha'airi
- Jadeed Ghazal
- Tanziat o muzhikat

== Death ==
Rasheed Ahmad Siddiqui died in Aligarh in 1977.

== See also ==
- List of Sahitya Akademi Award winners for Urdu
