= Ale Ahmad Suroor =

Indian Urdu poet, critic and professor

- Born: 9 September 1911; Badaun district, United Provinces of Agra and Oudh, India
- Died: 9 February 2002 (aged 90); Delhi, India
- Education: Aligarh Muslim University
- Occupations: Professor, Poet, Critic
- Writing career
- Language: Urdu
- Genres: Literary criticism, Ghazal
- Notable awards: Padma Bhushan (1991); Sahitya Akademi Award (1974)

Ale Ahmad Suroor (1911-2002) was an Urdu poet, critic and professor from India. He is best known for his literary criticism. In 1974 he was honoured with the Sahitya Akademi Award by the Government of India for his literary critic work, Nazar aur Nazariya. In 1991 he was also awarded the Padma Bhushan, India's third highest civilian award. He was awarded a special gold medal by the President of Pakistan on the centenary of the birth of Muhammad Iqbal.

== Early life ==
Suroor was born in the Badaun city of Uttar Pradesh on 9 September 1911. He studied Science and graduated from St John's College, Agra. He completed his master's degree in English literature in 1934. From 1958 to 1974 he worked as professor and Head of Urdu at Aligarh Muslim University.

== Philosophy ==
I am a Musalman and, in the words of Maulana Azad, “caretaker of the thirteen hundred years of the wealth that is Islam.” My deciphering of Islam is the key to the interpretation of my spirit. I am also an Indian and this Indianness is as much a part of my being. Islam does not deter me from believing in my Indian identity.

— Quote of Suroor from his autobiography

Suroor's autobiography, Khwab Baki Hai (Dream Still Remain), states, "Criticism takes the help of science but it is not a science; it is a branch of literature". Regarding poetry Suroor states that poetry does not bring "revolutions" but it creates right environment to make sudden change in mind, it is not "sword" but the "lancet".

== Work ==
Suroor wrote extensively on Urdu poet Muhammad Iqbal. Suroor was the founder director of the "Iqbal institute" in Kashmir University which is now known as the "Iqbal institute of Culture and Philosophy". The "Iqbal Chair" was established at Kashmir University in 1977 where Suroor was appointed as Iqbal professor.

=== Books ===
Suroor authored many books. The following is an incomplete list of Suroor's books.

- Khwab Baaki Hai (Dreams Still Remain): It is an autobiography of Suroor published in 1991.
- Nazar aur Nazariya (Sight and Perspective) (1973): Critic work which won Sahitya Akademi Award of Government of India in 1974.
- Tanqidi Ishare (Critical Signposts) (1942): It was Suroor's first collection of critical writing.
- Naye aur Purane Chirag (New and Old Lamps) (1946)
- Tanqid Kya Hai? (What is Criticism?) (1947)
- Adab aur Nazariya (Literature and Perspective) (1954)
- Jadidiyat aur Adab (Modernism and Literature) (1967)
- Masarrat se Basirat tak (From Pleasure to Insight) (1974)
- Urdu aur Hindustani Tehjib (Urdu and Indian culture) (1985)
- Afkar ke Diye (The Lamps of the Mind) (2000)

The following are some of books written by Suroor on Iqbal's legacy.

- Iqbal aur unka Falsafa (Iqbal and his Philosophy) (1977)
- Iqbal:Nazar aur Shairi (Iqbal:Vision and Poetry) (1978)
- Iqbal, Faiz aur Ham (Iqbal, Faiz and We) (1985)
- Iqbal ki Manviyat (The Relevance of Iqbal) (1986)
- Danishwar Iqbal (Iqbal The Intellectual) (1996)

== Awards and recognition ==
Suroor was honoured by following major awards

- Uttar Pradesh Urdu Akademi Award (1954)
- Delhi Urdu Akademi Award (1973)
- Sahitya Akademi Award (1974)
- Pakistan President's "Iqbal Centenary Gold Medal" presented to Suroor by the High Commissioner of Pakistan to India for his contribution to Muhammad Iqbal related literature (1978)
- Ghalib Modi Award (1982)
- Padma Bhushan by President of India (1992)
- Majlis-e-Farogh-e-Urdu (1996) : Regarded as the Urdu-speaking world's highest literary award.
- Iqbal Samman by Government of Madhya Pradesh (2001)

== Bibliography ==
- Ahmad, Imtiyaz (2005). Aale Ahmad Suroor: Hindustani Adab Ke Memar [Aale Ahmad Suroor: The Makers of Indian Literature] (in Urdu). Delhi: Sahitya Academy.
