= Hans (magazine) =

Hindi language magazine

Hans is the oldest and one of the most prestigious literary magazines in Hindi.

== History ==
Established by Premchand in 1930, it had Mahatma Gandhi in its editorial board and continued till 1956, when it was shut down by Amrit Rai, due to financial woes. The magazine was revived in 1986 by Rajendra Yadav, a noted short-story writer and novelist. His daughter Rachana, was bequeathed the ownership, after his death in 2013.

== Audience ==
The magazine is currently priced at INR 50 per issue and claims a consistent readership of about twelve thousand readers every month — two and a half thousand annual subscribers plus around nine thousand copies sold through vendors.

== Reception ==
Under Yadav's tutelage, Hans has been noted for its promotion of feminist and Dalit writers.
