= Chiragh Hasan Hasrat =

Journalist and poet (1904–1955)

Chiragh Hasan Hasrat چراغ حسن حسرت
- Born: Chiragh Hasan; 1904; Poonch, Jammu and Kashmir, British India
- Died: 26 June 1955 (aged 50–51); Lahore, Pakistan
- Other names: Columbus; Koocha Gard; Sindbaad Jahazi
- Occupations: Poet, newspaper Journalist

Chiragh Hasan Hasrat (1904 – 26 June 1955) (Urdu: چراغ حسن حسرت) was a Pakistani poet and a journalist from the Poonch district of the princely state of Jammu and Kashmir.

== Early life and career ==
Chirag Hasan was born in the Poonch district in the Jammu jagir of the princely state of Jammu and Kashmir in British India (now in Jammu and Kashmir, India), near the border of Kashmir division with Baramulla in 1904. He began composing poetry when he was still a student at school and after matriculation, he migrated to Pakistan with his family. Early in his career Chiragh started teaching at various local schools in Urdu and Persian. He wrote 16 books. He was also associated with several newspapers like Ehsan, Zamindar (زمیںدار), Sheeraza (شیرازہ) and Shahbaz (شاہ باز). He used different pen names including Columbus, Koocha Gard and Sindbaad Jahazi.

In 1920, he joined a school at Simla, Punjab (now in Himachal Pradesh, India) as a Persian teacher where he met Abul Kalam Azad. He was impressed by Azad and soon left the school to meet him again in Calcutta. Hasrat admitted that he had learned a lot from Azad, not only in the field of journalism but about politics and literature.

In 1925, Hasrat joined the newspaper Nai Dunya (the new world). Here he used to write a famous column Kalkatte ki baatein under the penname Columbus. Due to this column, he became famous and many journalists like Abul Kalam Azad, Maulana Zafar Ali Khan and Muhammad Ali Jauhar appreciated him.

After that, he joined Asr-e-Jadeed (the modern age) as assistant editor where he wrote a humor column Mataibaat under the penname of Koocha Gard and it further increased his reputation as a journalist and humorist.

In 1926, he launched his own literary journal, Aftab, from Calcutta. Hasrat also worked for Isteqlal and then Jamhoor, running a campaign for India's independence.

=== Nehru Report ===
Hasrat was a supporter of Congress and, in 1928, he supported Nehru Report, writing many columns in favor of it. Since majority of Muslims had rejected this report, backing it caused him to lose popularity among Muslims of India. Hasrat left Calcutta and joined Zafar Ali Khan's newspaper Zamindar in Lahore.

=== Coming to Lahore ===
In 1929, he came to Lahore to work for the newspaper Zamindar with Zafar Ali Khan as its editor. He wrote for various newspapers in Lahore and then launched his own newspaper Sheeraza in 1936. In 1940, he joined All India Radio, Delhi.

== Army service ==
Soon after going to Delhi, Hasrat joined the British Indian Army and rapidly rose to the rank of Major.

== Life in Pakistan ==
Besides working for various newspapers as a columnist, he also worked for Radio Pakistan, Lahore for a short time in the early 1950s.

== Death ==
He could not work anywhere for too long and was known as a job-hopper. But then his health deteriorated. Chiragh Hasan Hasrat died in Lahore, Pakistan on 26 June 1955.

== Books ==
He wrote 16 books. Unfortunately, not a single one of his poetic collection was ever published. Some of his famous books are:

- Kele Ka Chhilka
- Mataibaat
- Harf-o-Hikayat
- Dou Doctor
- Murdum-deeda
