= Ghulam Mustafa Tabassum =

Pakistani poet and author (1899-1978)

Sufi Tabassum صُوفی تبسّم
- Born: Ghulam Mustafa; 4 August 1899; Amritsar, Punjab Province, British India
- Died: 7 February 1978 (aged 78); Lahore, Pakistan
- Occupations: Poet and Author
- Writing career
- Genre: Fiction
- Subject: Literature

Ghulam Mustafa Tabassum (Punjabi: غُلام مُصطفا تبسّم, Urdu: غُلام مُصطفیٰ تبسّم) (4 August 1899 – 7 February 1978) was a 20th-century poet. His pen name was Tabassum (Urdu: تبسّم).

He is best known for his many poems written for children, as the creator of the character Tot Batot, and as the translator of many poetic works mostly from Persian into Punjabi and Urdu languages.

== Early life and career ==
Sufi Tabassum was born on 4 August 1899 in Amritsar, Punjab, to parents of Kashmiri ancestry. He earned a master's degree in Persian language from Forman Christian College (FCC) in Lahore, Pakistan. He worked for and remained with Government College Lahore for his entire career, rising to head the Department of Persian Studies in 1943. Tabassum retired from Government College in 1954.

Sufi Tabassum was also closely associated with the members of an informal literary circle called Niazmandan-e-Lahore. This circle's members included Pakistan's noted literary personalities including Patras Bokhari, Abdul Majeed Salik, Imtiaz Ali Taj, M. D. Taseer, Chiragh Hasan Hasrat, Hafeez Jalandhari, Abdur Rahman Chughtai and Majeed Malik. Sufi Tabassum also edited the magazine Lail-o-Nahar for a while in addition to working for Radio Pakistan, Pakistan Arts Council and Iqbal Academy.

In Pakistan, he is considered a pioneer in children's poetry. Totbatot and Jhoolnay are his popular poems for children.

== Poems ==
For fifty years, he was actively participating in Radio Pakistan and Pakistan Television poetry events. His poems were used as the lyrics of several songs sung by Noor Jehan, Naseem Begum, Farida Khanum and Ghulam Ali.

Song	Singers	Song lyrics by	Music by	Film or Produced by
"Sau Baar Chaman Mehka, Sau Baar Bahar Aaee"	Naseem Begum	Ghulam Mustafa Tabassum	Rasheed Attre	film Shaam Dhalay (1960)
"Aye Puttar Hattan Tay Nahin Vikday, Tuun Labhdi Phirrein Bazaar Kurray"	Noor Jehan	Ghulam Mustafa Tabassum	Hassan Latif Lilak	A Radio Pakistan, Lahore production (A Qaumi Naghma from the Indo-Pakistani war of 1971)
"Who Mujh Say Huay Ham Kalam Allah Allah"	Farida Khanum	Ghulam Mustafa Tabassum	Hassan Latif Lilak	A Pakistan Television, Lahore production
"Meray Shauq Da Nahin Aetbar Teinun"	Ghulam Ali	Ghulam Mustafa Tabassum		A Pakistan Television production ('Nikhar' PTV program-1973)
"Meray Dhol Sipahya Teinun Rab Dian Rakhhaan"	Shehzad Roy and Ayesha Omer	Ghulam Mustafa Tabassum		Another 1965 War Qaumi Naghma redone by Shehzad Roy. This Qaumi Naghma was originally sung by Madam Noor Jehan.

== Awards and recognition ==
- In 1962, he received the Pride of Performance Award from the President of Pakistan
- In 1966, he received the Tamgha-e-Nishan-e-Sipaas award of the Government of Iran.
- He was also awarded the Sitara-i-Imtiaz, Award (Star of Excellence) by the President of Pakistan.
- In 2023, he was awarded the Nishan-i-Imtiaz (Order of Excellence) Award by the President of Pakistan.

== Works (partial list) ==
- Tot Batot Collection. Published by Ferozsons (no date), ISBN 969-0-01118-9
- Ab Sab Hain Tot Batot Mian, Published by Gulzar Ahmed, 2000
- Jhoolnay (collection of poems for children), Published by Ferozsons (no date)
- Doguna. Published by Ferozsons (a translation of the works of Hazarat Amir Khusrow)
- Sawan Raina Da Sufna, a translation into Punjabi of Shakespeare's A Midsummer Night's Dream, unknown publisher
- Talmatol (collection of poems for children)
- Daman-i-Dil
- Kulliyaat-i-Sufi Tabassum (Poetry in Urdu language)
- Nazraan Kardiyaan Gallaan (Poetry in Punjabi language)
- Naqsh-i-Iqbal (Punjabi translation of Allama Iqbal's poetry)

== Death ==
Sufi Ghulam Mustafa Tabassum died in Lahore, Pakistan on 7 February 1978.
