= Firaq Gorakhpuri =

Indian Urdu poet

Firaq Gorakhpuri فراق گورکھ پوری
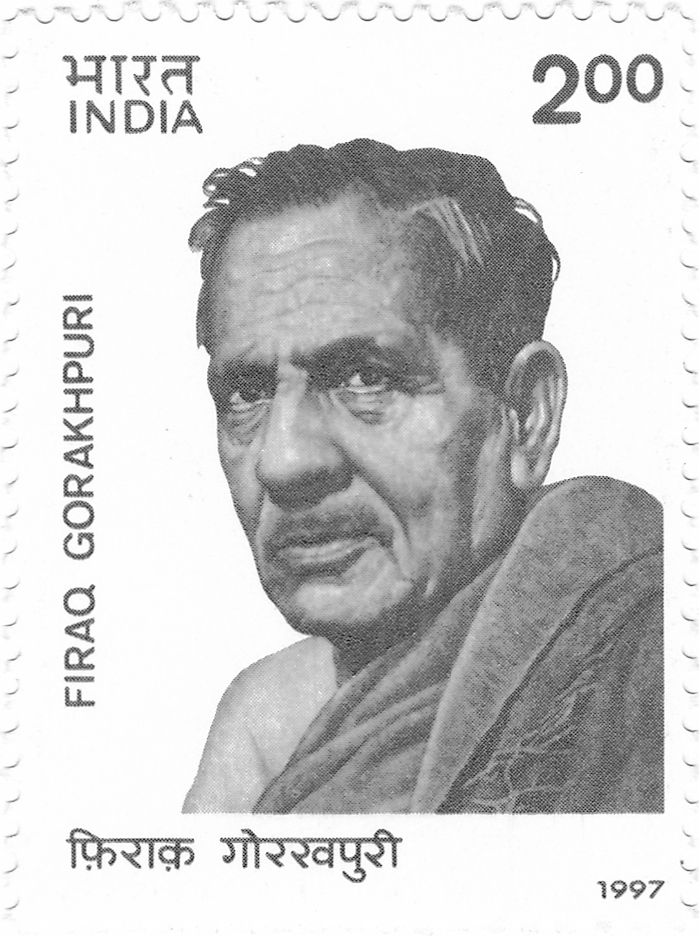
- Born: Raghupati Sahay فراق گورکھ پوری; 28 August 1896; Gorakhpur, North-Western Provinces, British India
- Died: 3 March 1982 (aged 85); New Delhi, India
- Education: Lucknow University; Allahabad University (M.A.)
- Occupations: Poet, writer, critic, scholar, lecturer, orator
- Writing career
- Pen name: Firaq Gorakhpuri رگھوپتی سہائے
- Language: Urdu, English, Hindi
- Genres: Poetry, Literary criticism
- Notable work: Gul-e-Naghma
- Notable awards: Padma Bhushan (1968); Jnanpith Award (1969); Sahitya Akademi Fellowship (1970)

Signature
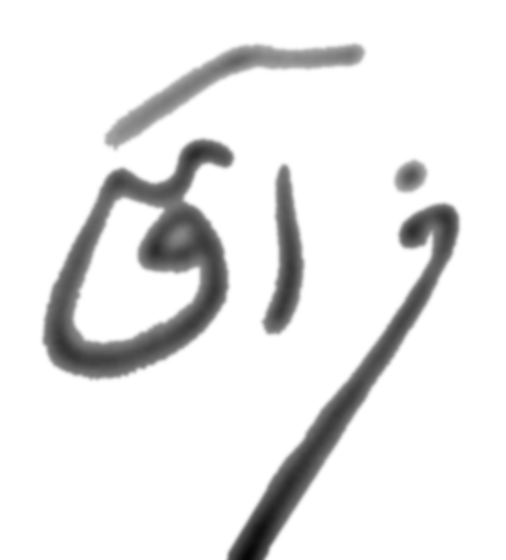

Raghupati Sahay (Urdu: رگھوپتی سہائے)(28 August 1896 – 3 March 1982), also known by his pen name Firaq Gorakhpuri, was an Indian writer, critic, and, according to one commentator, one of the most noted contemporary Urdu poets from India. He established himself among peers including Muhammad Iqbal, Yagana Changezi, Jigar Moradabadi and Josh Malihabadi.

== Early life and career ==
Raghupati Sahay was born in Banwarpar village of Gorakhpur district on 28 August 1896 in a well-to-do and educated Hindu Kayastha family. He finished his basic education at the Lucknow Christian College and went on to earn himself a master's degree in Urdu, Persian and English literature.

Firaq had shown early signs of excellence in Urdu poetry and had always shown attraction towards literature. His contemporaries included famous Urdu poets like Allama Iqbal, Faiz Ahmed Faiz, Kaifi Azmi and Sahir Ludhianvi. Yet he was able to make his mark in Urdu poetry at an early age.

He was selected for the Provincial Civil Service (P.C.S.) and the Indian Civil Service (British India) (I.C.S.), but he resigned to follow Mahatma Gandhi's non-cooperation movement and for which he was jailed for 18 months. Later, he joined Allahabad University as a lecturer in English literature. It was there that he wrote most of his Urdu poetry, including his magnum opus Gul-e-Naghma which earned him the highest literary award of India, the Jnanpith Award, and also the 1960 Sahitya Akademi Award in Urdu. During his life, he was given the positions of research professor at the University Grants Commission and Producer Emeritus by All India Radio. After a long illness, he died on 3 March 1982, in New Delhi.

Gorakhpuri was well-versed in all traditional metrical forms such as ghazal, nazm, rubaai and qat'aa. He wrote more than a dozen volumes of Urdu poetry, a half dozen of Urdu prose, several volumes on literary themes in Hindi, as well as four volumes of English prose on literary and cultural subjects.

His biography, Firaq Gorakhpuri: The Poet of Pain & Ecstasy, written by his nephew Ajai Mansingh was published by Roli Books in 2015. The book included anecdotes from his life and translations of some of his work.

== Selected works ==
- Gul-e-Naghma گلِ نغمہ
- Gul-e-Ra'naa گلِ رعنا
- Mash'aal مشعال
- Rooh-e-Kaayenaat روحِ کائنات
- Roop رُوپ (Rubaayi رُباعی )
- Shabnamistaan شبنمِستان
- Sargam سرگم
- Bazm-e-Zindagi Rang-e-Shayri بزمِ زندگی رنگِ شاعری

== Awards ==
- 1960 – Sahitya Akademi Award in Urdu
- 1968 – Padma Bhushan
- 1968 – Soviet Land Nehru Award
- 1969 – Jnanpith Award (First Jnanpith Award for Urdu literature)
- 1970 – Sahitya Akademi Fellowship
- 1981 – Ghalib Academy Award

== Death and legacy ==
Firaq Gorakhpuri died on 3 March 1982 at age 85. Firaq fought for secularism all his life and played a key role against the then government's effort to label Urdu as a language of the Muslims. Firaq espoused a deep affection for Urdu and emphasised the importance of keeping Urdu in the collective linguistic awareness of India and the subcontinent. "Zubaan kisi qaum ki milkiyat nahin/ Jisne seekhi, usne kahi" (Language is not the prerogative of any particular society; the person who has learnt it, speaks it) was his statement.
