= List of Pashto-language films =

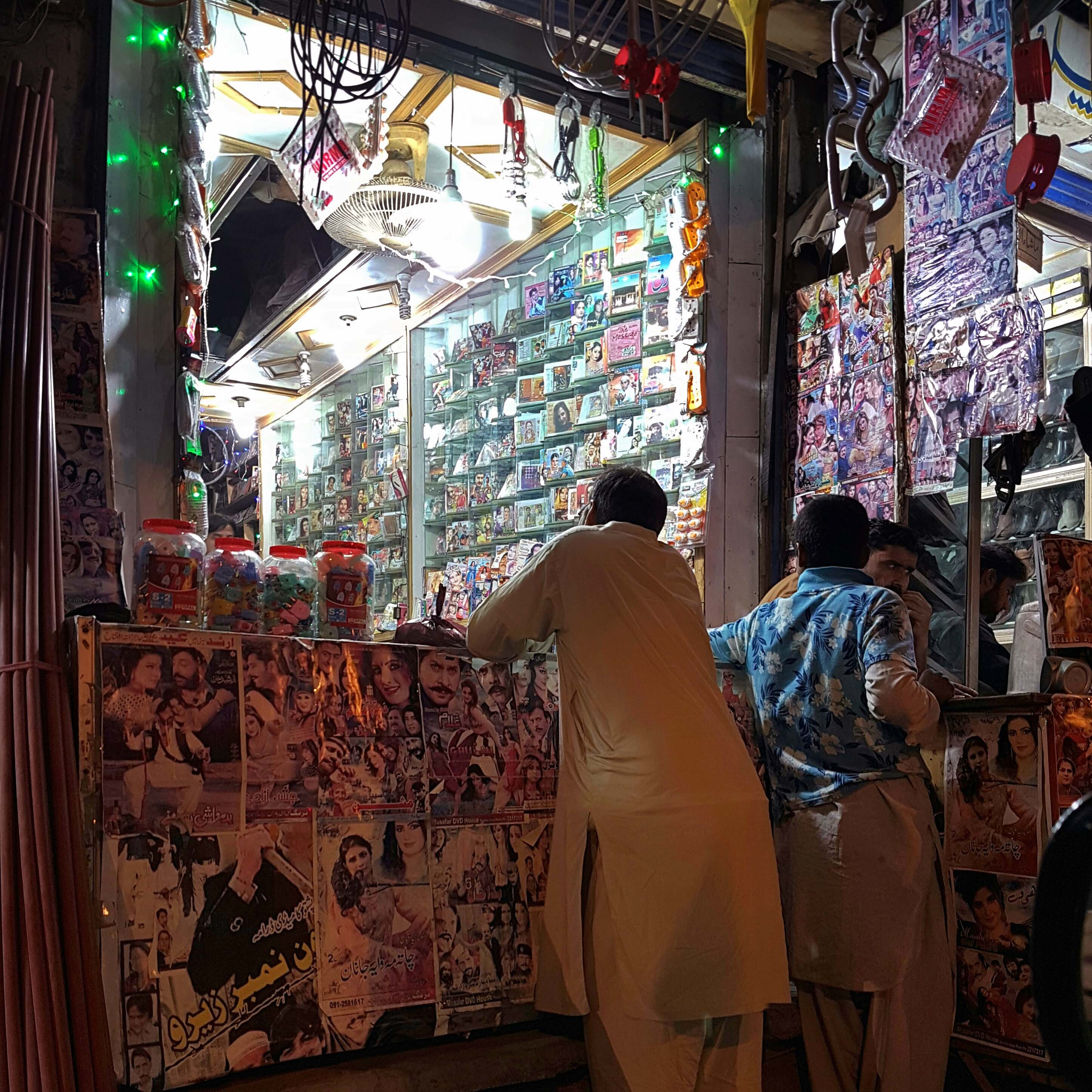
Shop selling Pashto-language films

The following is a list of Pashto-language films:

== Highest grossing films ==
Top 10 highest-grossing Pashto films of all time (as of 2018).

Rank	Title	Year	Studio	Worldwide Gross	Ref.
1	Janaan	2016	IRK Films	Rs. 30 crore (US$1.1 million)	
2	Zama Arman	2013	Liaqat Films	Rs. 6 crore (US$210,000)	
3	I Miss You	2014	Abid Naseem Films	Rs. 3.50 crore (US$130,000)	
4	Moor	2015	Azad Film Company	Rs. 1.85 crore (US$66,000)	
5	Dukhtar	2014	Geo Films	Rs. 1.65 crore (US$59,000)	
6	Badal	2016	Hunerkada Films	Rs. 1.60 crore (US$57,000)	
7	Tezaab	2015	Shahid Usman Films	Rs. 1.59 crore (US$57,000)	
8	Badnaam	2015	Nadir Khan Films	Rs. 1.55 crore (US$55,000)	
9	Haram Khor	2014	Qaiser Sanober Films	Rs. 1.48 crore (US$53,000)	
10	Jashan	2016	Shahid Usman Films	Rs. 1.40 crore (US$50,000)	

== 1970s ==
	Title	Director	Cast	Genre	Notes
1970	Kala Khazan Kala Bahar	Jamil ahmad	Aman		
1970	Yousuf Khan Sher Bano	Aziz Tabassum	Yasmin Khan, Badar Munir, Noreen, Nageena, Nemat Sarhadi	Drama	It the first-ever Pashto film released in Pakistan. It was also debut film for Badar Munir and Yasmin Khan. The film was released on 1 December 1970.
1971	Darra Khyber	Mumtaz Ali Khan	Asif Khan, Surayya Khan, Rabnawaz, Umar Daraz, Aman, Rehana	Social	Released on 14 May 1971
1971	Bahadur Khan	B.R. Sayed	Rukhsana, Humayun Qureshi, Nagina		Released on 18 June 1971
1971	Adam Khan Dukhaniye				
1971	Ajab Khan Afridi				A film about Ajab Khan Afridi
1971	Moosa Khan Gul Makei				
1972	Memone				
1972	Meh Jabeenay				
1972	Zama Badal				
1972	Makhrur				
1972	Ghazi Kaka				
1972	Ilaqa Ghair				
1973	Charagh Aladin				
1973	Dagodar Ghara				
1973	Farhad Shirinayi				
1973	Orbal				
1973	Melma				
1973	Da Pakhtun Tora				
1973	Juwargar				
1974	Jang Aw Amn				
1974	Topak Zama Qanoon				
1974	Naeem Shah				
1974	Dehqan				
1974	Wotan Mena				
1974	Khana Badosh				
1974	Rehamdad Khan				
1975	Deedan				
1975	Baz-o-Shehbaz				
1975	Zartaja				
1975	Baghi				
1975	Da Arman				
1975	Kochwan				
1975	Nave Dayu Shappey	Mumtaz Ali Khan	Badar Munir, Qamar Jehan		A Urdu/Pashto double version film, with the Urdu version being named Dulhan Ek Raat Ki.
1976	Haibat Khan				
1976	Da Inteqam Lumbay				
1976	Da Meeney Awar				
1976	Kafirstan				
1977	Sheeno				
1977	Ehsan				
1977	Qaidi				
1977	Meranay Roar				
1977	Veena-o-Meena				
1978	Tarbur				
1978	Sarah Jora				
1978	Zama Ghairat				
1978	Gul Bano				
1978	Ilzam				
1978	Juvand Ya Marg	Laeeq Akhter			
1978	Chal Wal				
1978	Mujahid				
1979	Nadan				
1979	Shaheed				
1979	Ganrkap				
1979	Mujim				
1979	Dolai				
1979	Badnaam				
1979	Anjaam				
1979	Tandur				

== 2000s ==
Son of a Lion (2007)

== See also ==
- List of Pashto-language films of 2017
