= December 1970 =

Month of 1970

<<	December 1970					>>
Su	Mo	Tu	We	Th	Fr	Sa
		1	2	3	4	5
6	7	8	9	10	11	12
13	14	15	16	17	18	19
20	21	22	23	24	25	26
27	28	29	30	31

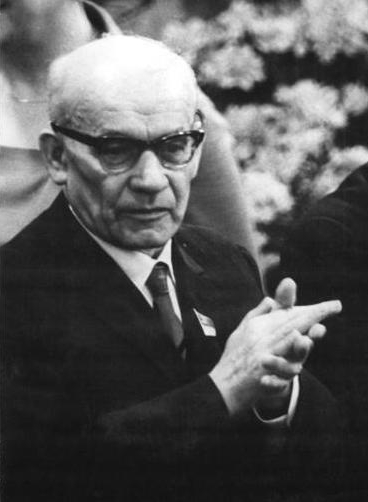
December 20, 1970: Poland's Communist leader Gomulka fired after raising prices in the winter

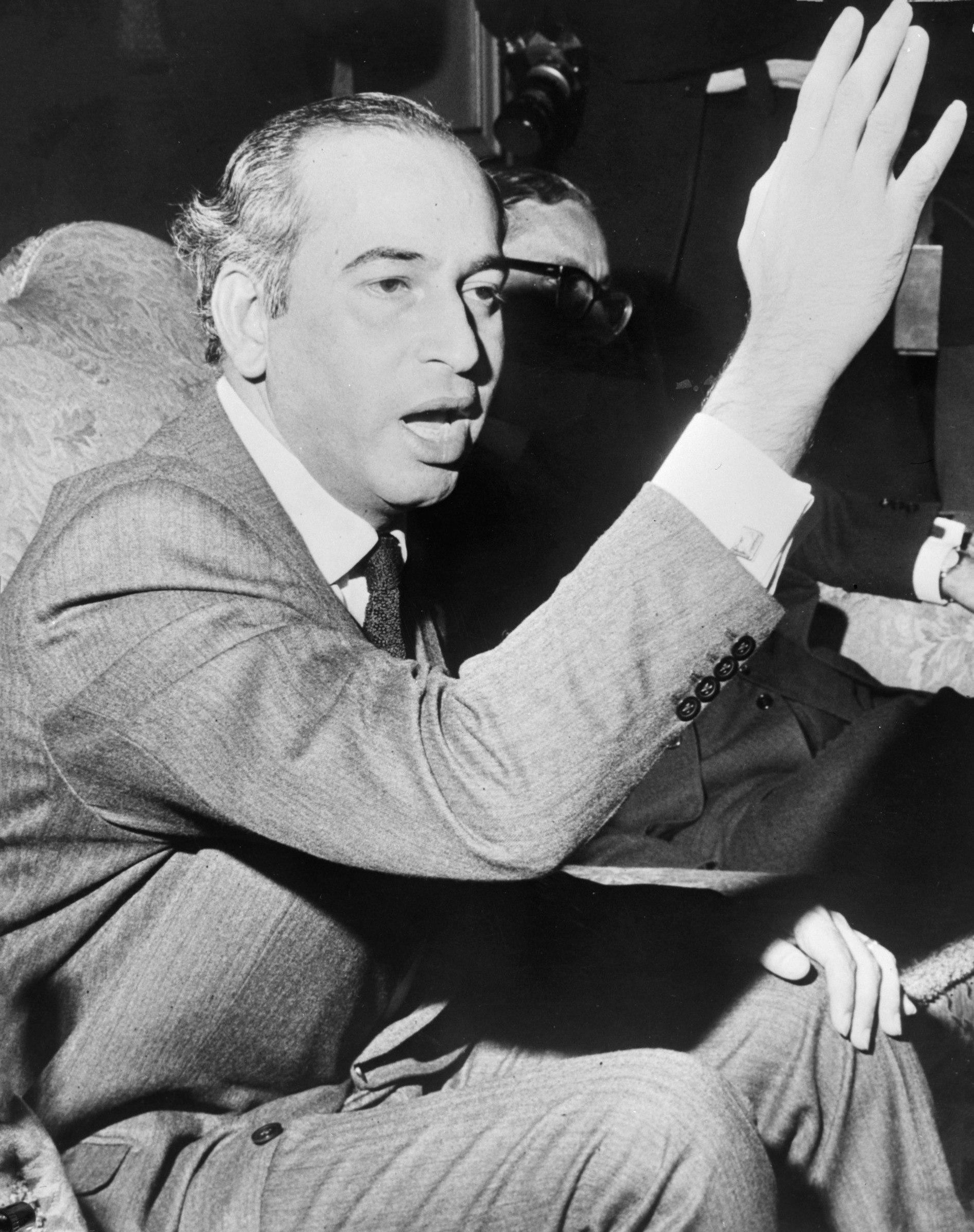
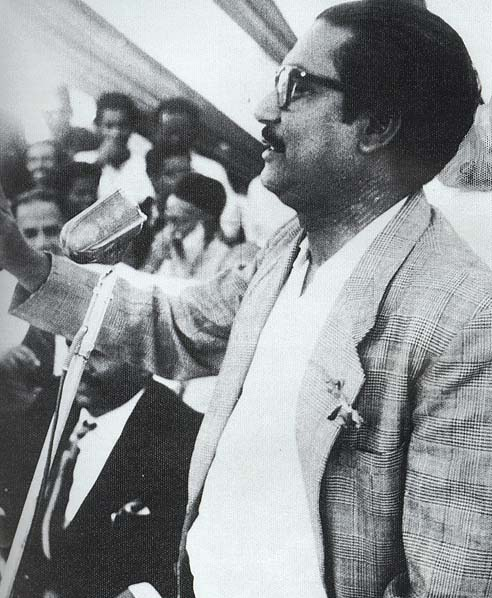
December 7, 1970: West Pakistan's Bhutto loses control of government to East Pakistan's Mujibur in Pakistan election

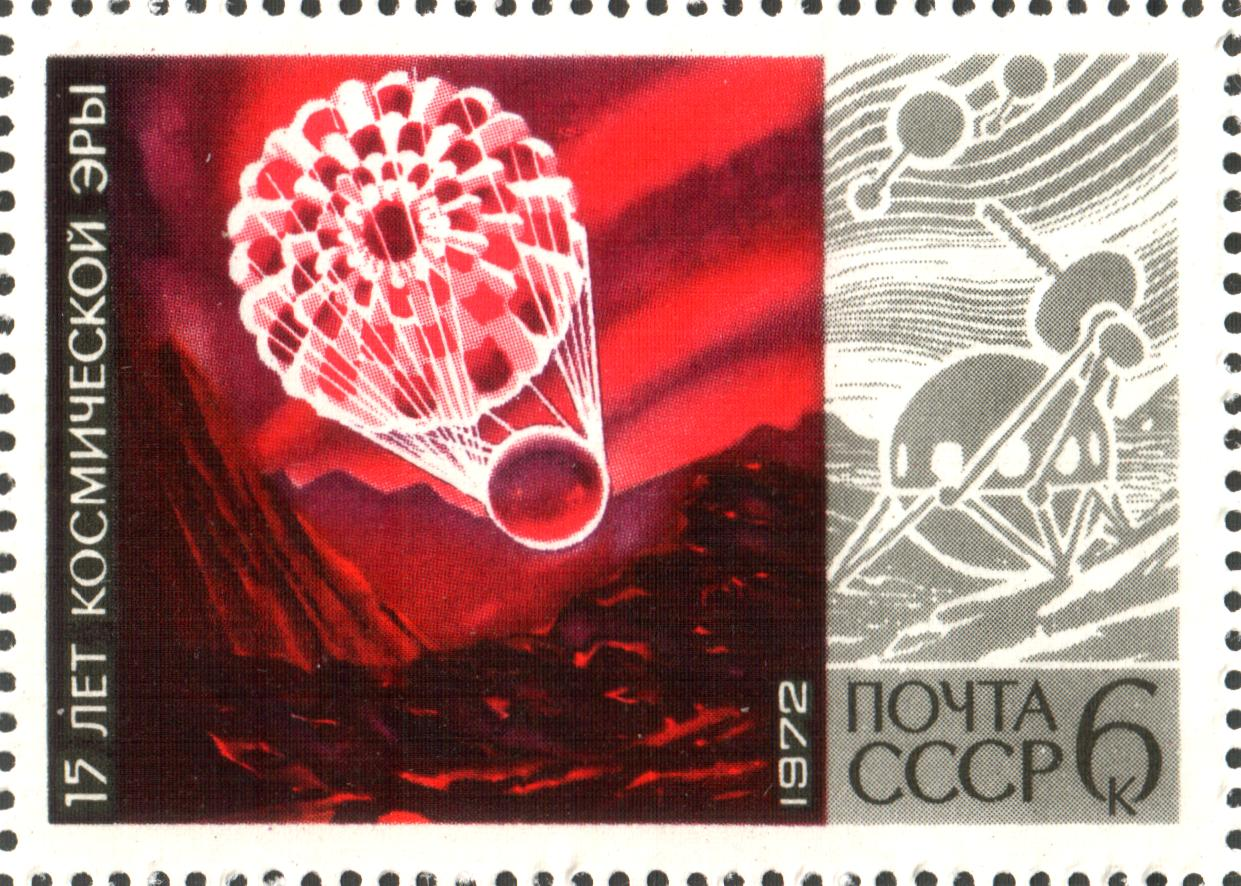
December 15, 1970: Venera 7 lands on Venus

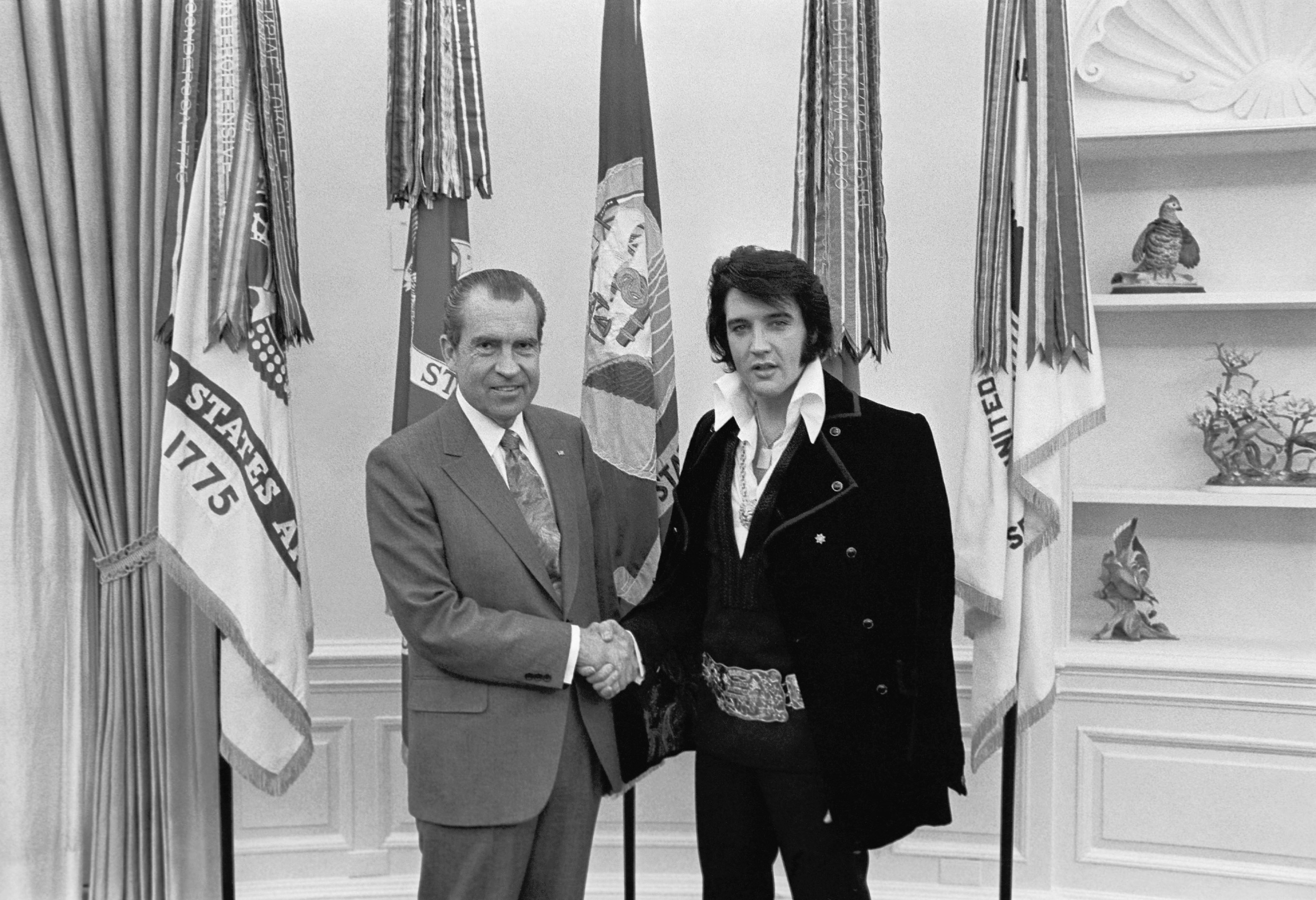
December 21, 1970: President Nixon and Elvis Presley have famous meeting

The following events occurred in December 1970:

== December 1, 1970 (Tuesday) ==
- Italy's Chamber of Deputies voted, 319 to 286, to join the Senate of the Republic in approving a bill to legalize divorce President Giovanni Leone signed the bill and the Law 1970 no. 898 went into effect on December 18.
- Yousuf Khan Sher Bano, directed by Aziz Tabassum and produced by Nazir Hussain, was released in Pakistan, as the first Pashto-language film in the nation. Although thousands of Urdu language films had been produced since 1930, Pashto cinema (sometimes called Pollywood) had not been financed.
- The Basque ETA kidnapped West Germany diplomat Eugen Beihl in San Sebastián. The ETA released Beihl on Christmas Eve.
- Luis Echeverría was inaugurated as the 50th President of Mexico for a six-year term. He used his inaugural address to criticize "Mexican empresarios who sell thriving businesses" to foreign investors as people who "pawn the inheritance of their children", and pledged that his administration would give preference "to foreign investors who establish new industries, run by Mexicans, which contribute to the technological revolution.
- The People's Republic of Southern Yemen was renamed the People's Democratic Republic of Yemen by the National Liberation Front, led by President Salim Rubai Ali, with a new constitution for the former Aden Protectorate.
- Sweden repatriated two American soldiers, who had deserted the United States Army to avoid service in the Vietnam War, on a flight from Stockholm to New York. The two men had been granted safe haven until they broke Sweden's narcotics laws, and deported after completing sentences of nine months in prison.
- What Color Is Your Parachute?, a bestselling self-help book by Richard Nelson Bolles intended for job-seekers, was first published by the author, who later found a publisher in 1972. In 1991, the Library of Congress would name Bolles' book as one of "25 books that have shaped readers' lives"
- Born: Sarah Silverman, American comedian, screenwriter and TV actress, winner of two Emmy Awards
- Died:
  - William "Rip" Robertson, 50, American CIA officer; from malaria
  - Ruth Law Oliver, 83, early American aviator

== December 2, 1970 (Wednesday) ==

- The United States Environmental Protection Agency (EPA) began operations five months after a governmental reorganization plan had been issued by U.S. President Richard M. Nixon. The agency's first administrator, William Ruckelshaus, was sworn into office two days later.
- Born: Treach (stage name for Anthony Criss), American rapper for Naughty by Nature and actor; in East Orange, New Jersey

== December 3, 1970 (Thursday) ==
- In Montreal, kidnapped British Trade Commissioner James Cross was released by the Front de libération du Québec terrorist group after being held hostage for 60 days, turning him over to a Cuban delegation at the negotiation site where the Expo '67 World's Fair had been held. Police negotiated his release and in return, the Government of Canada granted five terrorists from the FLQ's Chenier Cell their request for safe passage to Cuba, and Cross was set free after confirmation that the flight from Montreal had arrived safely in Havana.
- The U.S. Senate voted, 52 to 41, to end further funding of the development of an American supersonic transport (SST) plane by slashing $290,000,000 earmarked in U.S. Department of Transportation funds
- Japan's Bureau of Statistics reported that the population of that nation had passed 100 million people for the first time, a 5.5% increase since 1965. According to the census results, Japan's population on October 1, 1970, was 102,703,552
- In Burgos, Spain, the trial of 16 Basque terrorism suspects began. The members of ETA (Euskadi Ta Askatasuna or "Basque Homeland and Liberty") had been indicted following the 1968 murder of a superintendent of a branch of the secret police, Melitón Manzanas, in Irun on August 2, 1968.
- Born:
  - Jimmy Sheirgill (stage name for Jasjit Singh Gill), Indian film actor and producer; in Gorakhpur, Uttar Pradesh
  - Stephanie Herseth Sandlin, South Dakota's U.S. Representative from 2004 to 2011, and president of Augustana University; in Aberdeen, South Dakota

== December 4, 1970 (Friday) ==
- The Spanish government declared a three-month period of martial law in Burgos and the surrounding province of Guipuzcoa, after 15,000 workers walked out on strike to protest the trial.
- The United Nations announced that its investigators concluded that Portuguese Navy and Army units had been responsible for the attempted invasion of Guinea in November, despite Portugal's assertions that it had not crossed over from its colony into the west African republic.
- Born:
  - Kevin Sussman, American TV actor best known as Stuart on The Big Bang Theory; in New York City
  - Fat Pat (stage name for Patrick Hawkins), American rapper; in Houston (murdered 1998)

== December 5, 1970 (Saturday) ==
- The #1 ranked University of Texas Longhorns college football team defeated their conference rival, the #4 ranked University of Arkansas Razorbacks, 42 to 7, to close the regular season unbeaten (10-0-0) and to win a share of the mythical 1970 college football championship. At the time, the United Press International poll of college coaches made its final decision before the post-season bowl games were played, and voted Texas number one in its final poll. Texas lost the Cotton Bowl on January 1, however, to the #6 ranked Fighting Irish of Notre Dame the Associated Press poll of sportswriters voted the Nebraska Cornhuskers as their pick for national champion.
- Born:
  - Martin Selmayr, West German-born Secretary-General of the European Commission; in Bonn
  - Tim Hetherington, English photojournalist; in Birkenhead, Cheshire (d. 2011 covering the Libyan civil war)

== December 6, 1970 (Sunday) ==
- What appeared at first to be a routine freight car derailment in western New York state began at about 3:30 in the morning when 25 railroad cars came off the track near Le Roy, New York and spilled more than 30,000 US gallons (110,000 L) of the industrial solvent trichloroethylene (TCE) that seeped into the groundwater serving the wells of the Genesee County community. By 1991, state health department officials would discover that the contamination from TCE had spread into 31 well sites in Genesee County and neighboring Monroe County and Livingston County and the site of the spill would be added to the United States Environmental Protection Agency's list of Superfund cleanup sites in 1999
- Born: Ulf Ekberg, Swedish pop musician and co-founder of Ace of Base; in Gothenburg
- Died:
  - U.S. Air Force General Thomas S. Power, 65, director of the U.S. Strategic Air Command during the Cuban Missile Crisis.
  - Jean Déré, 84, French classical composer

== December 7, 1970 (Monday) ==
- Voting began in the first ever nationwide election in Pakistan (which, at the time, included Bangladesh as the province of East Pakistan) for the 313-member National Assembly. The result was that the Awami League won 160 of the 162 seats that had been reserved for East Pakistan, while the Pakistan People's Party won only 81 of the 138 seats reserved for West Pakistan, the other 57 being split among various political parties. The government of Pakistan, dominated since its 1947 independence by the Punjabis, Pashtuns, Sindhis of the side west of India, was scheduled to be controlled by the Bengalis of the side east of India, whose Awami League representatives had an absolute majority. The resistance by Pakistan's President Yahya Khan and Prime Minister Zulfikar Ali Bhutto to allowing the elected Assembly to form an East Pakistan controlled government would lead to a civil war and the breakup of the Islamic nation in 1971.

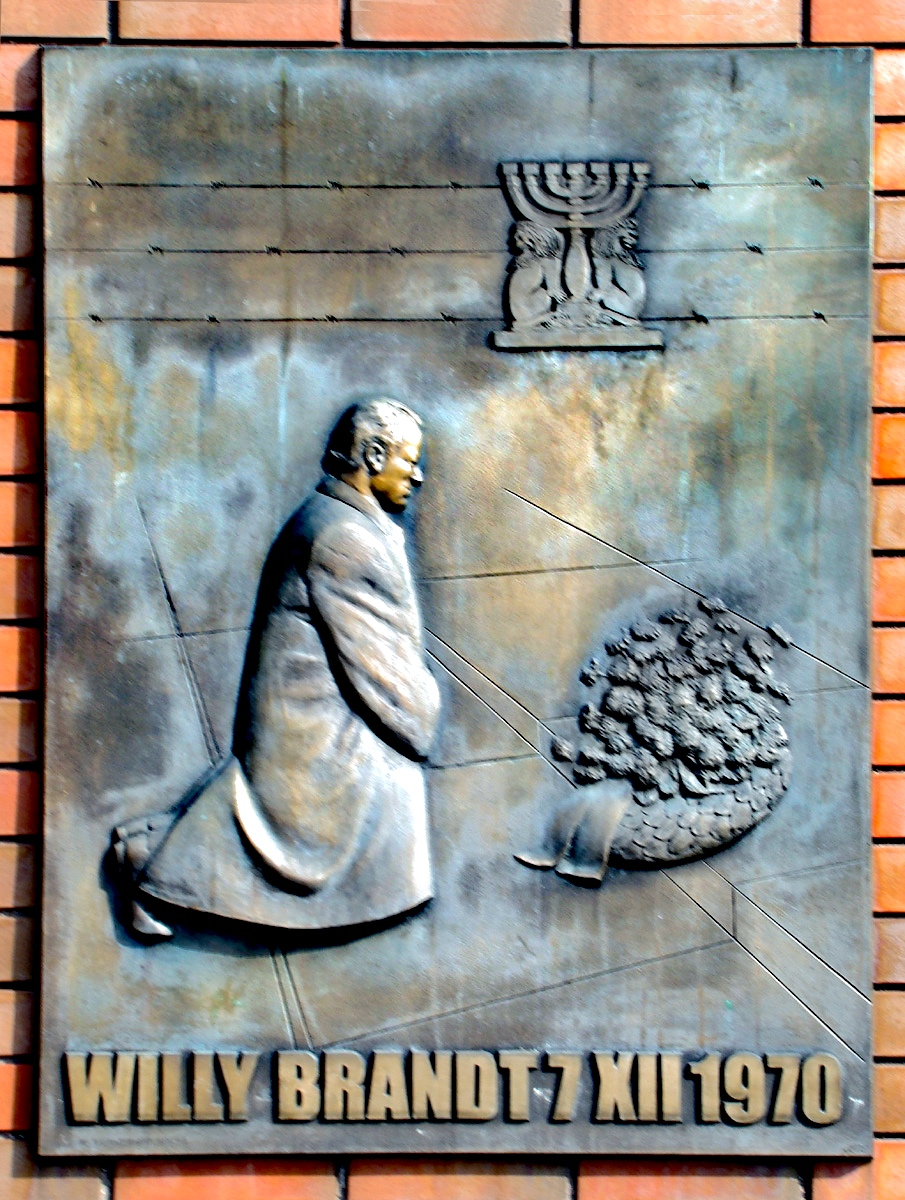
Commemoration of Der Kniefall

- During his visit to the Polish capital, German Chancellor Willy Brandt went down on his knees in front of the monument to the victims of the Warsaw Ghetto, then placed a wreath at the site. The symbolic act of German remorse for its persecution of Poland's Jews would become known as the Warschauer Kniefall ("the Warsaw Kneeling"). Brandt then signed the treaty with Poland, acknowledging West Germany's acceptance of the cession of former German territory east of the Oder river.
- Giovanni Enrico Bucher, Switzerland's ambassador to Brazil, was kidnapped in Rio de Janeiro; kidnappers demanded the release of 70 political prisoners. Bucher would be freed on January 16 after 40 days as a hostage, following Brazil's deportation of the 70 prisoners to Chile.
- On the 29th anniversary of the Japanese bombing of Pearl Harbor in Hawaii, George Ariyoshi was sworn in as Lieutenant Governor of Hawaii, the highest level up to that time attained in politics by a person of Japanese ancestry. Ariyoshi, who had been running mate in the reelection campaign of Governor John A. Burns, said in his inaugural address, "Governor Burns has often said that Hawaii is the impossible dream come true. And in a real sense today is an impossible dream to come true— for the son of immigrant parents born and reared in the slums of Honolulu." Ariyoshi, 15 years old at the time of the 1941 bombing, would succeed Burns as Governor of Hawaii in 1974.
- Born: Lado Gurgenidze, Prime Minister of Georgia from 2007 to 2008; in Tbilisi
- Died: Rube Goldberg, 87, popular American cartoonist. His death came less than two weeks after he appeared at a dinner at the Smithsonian Institution to celebrate the opening of an exhibition of his work, including working models of his humorous conceptions "agonizingly intricate inventions to accomplish simple tasks".

== December 8, 1970 (Tuesday) ==
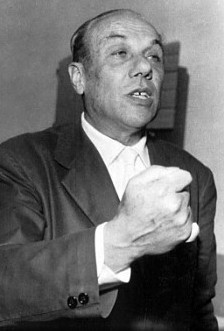
Junio Borghese

- A neo-fascist plot to overthrow the government of Italy was called off a few hours before Prince Junio Borghese was preparing to seize the nation's television networks and to announce the coup d'état Borghese, a captain in the Italian Navy during World War II, had formed an ultra-right political party, the Fronte Nazionale (FN), after becoming dissatisfied with the lack of action of right-wing Italian Social Movement. Borghese and the FN supporters were dispersed by the police, and their seizure of the Ministry of the Interior went unreported until it was revealed a few months later by the newspaper. By the time prosecutors began an investigation, Borghese had fled to safety to Spain Italy's Minister of the Interior, Franco Restivo, confirmed the rumors on March 30. A trial of 42 conspirators would take place in 1972 Borghese would die in Spain in 1974.
- Died:
  - Sir Christopher Kelk Ingold, 77, pioneering English organic chemistry scientist
  - Philip Edward Smith, 86, pioneering American endocrinologist
  - Abraham Alikhanov, 66, pioneering Soviet Armenian particle physicist
  - Benno Gut, 73, Swiss Roman Catholic cardinal and the Prefect of the Congregation for Divine Worship and the Discipline of the Sacraments
  - Alda Garrido, 74, Brazilian vaudeville actress
  - Houston Bright, 54, American choral music composer, from cancer

== December 9, 1970 (Wednesday) ==
- The U.S. House of Representatives took the unprecedented act of voting to raise the pay of American railway workers in an effort to prevent a walkout scheduled to take place at midnight. Final approval of the bill, which gave workers an immediate 13.5% wage increase and ordered further striking to be postponed until March 1, 1971, passed the House, 198 to 131.
- The U.S. Department of the Interior announced that it was suspending any limitations on offshore oil production and that American oil and natural gas producers could produce as much as possible "within the limits of maximum efficiency".
- An earthquake in the Andes Mountains killed 28 people in Peru and Ecuador.
- John Warren, a player for the worst team in the National Basketball Association, the Cleveland Cavaliers, inadvertently scored for the Portland Trail Blazers in their 109 to 102 win at Cleveland. As the fourth quarter began with a tipoff, Warren took a pass from a teammate and raced unimpeded toward the Portland basket and made an easy layup. In the box score, LeRoy Ellis of Portland was credited with the score because he had been the last Portland player to touch the ball. Cleveland's record dropped to 2 wins and 28 losses.
- Born: Kara DioGuardi, American songwriter and composer; in Ossining, New York
- Died: Feroz Khan Noon, 77, Prime Minister of Pakistan from 1957 to 1958.

== December 10, 1970 (Thursday) ==
- A nationwide strike of United States railroad workers began at 12:01 a.m. Eastern Standard Time, while the U.S. Senate was meeting after midnight in order to join the House of Representatives in approving legislation to halt the walkout. The Senate approved the House bill by voice vote, and President Richard M. Nixon then signed it into law at 2:30 in the morning By evening, the walkout was called off by order of United Transportation Union president C. L. Dennis, who was complying with a federal court order to enforce the legislation
- Lee Iacocca became the new president of the Ford Motor Company by the U.S. automobile manufacturer's board of directors. Iacocca, credited with revitalizing the company with the design and introduction of the Ford Mustang automobile, had been one of the three members of a triumvirate that had managed the company since the firing of President Semon "Bunkie" Knudsen on September 11, 1969. The other two officers, William D. Innes and Robert Stevenson, were named as executive vice presidents.
- Born: Kevin Sharp, American country music singer; in Redding, California (d. of surgical complications 2014)

== December 11, 1970 (Friday) ==
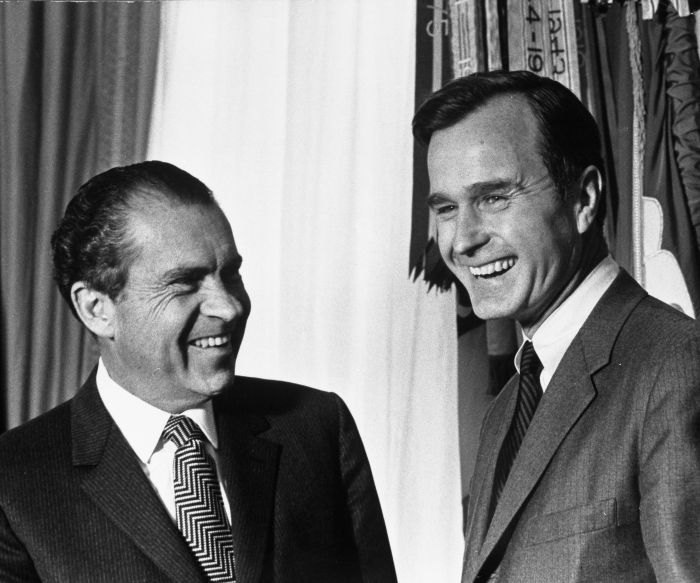
The 37th and 41st U.S. presidents in 1970

- U.S. Representative George H. W. Bush, who had been defeated in his November bid for re-election, was named by President Nixon to be the next United States Ambassador to the United Nations. Nixon announced that he had asked the current ambassador, Charles W. Yost, to remain in diplomatic service. Bush would become the 41st President of the United States in 1989.
- Nine people were killed, and 50 others injured, in a fiery explosion at Ryan's Bar and Grill in New York City, across the street from the City Hall. The blast was attributed to a broken gas line, and was ruled to be accidental.
- Born: Wendy Guerra, Cuban novelist and actress; in Havana
- Died:
  - Akira Nishiguchi, 44, Japanese serial killer, was executed in prison by hanging
  - Jim Rayburn, 61, American Presbyterian minister who founded the religious organization Young Life in 1941.

== December 12, 1970 (Saturday) ==
- Over 100 people in Colombia were killed when heavy rains triggered a landslide that swept two buses and 16 vehicles off of a mountain road and into the Cauca River that separated the departamentos (provinces) of Antioquia and Caldas One survivor, a bus driver, reported that he had been stopped by a line of cars while waiting for a small landslide to be cleared from the highway, when the mountain gave way at about 9:00 in the morning; people who weren't buried alive drowned when the landslide debris displaced the river and caused it to overflow within seconds in the form of a giant wave The disaster happened south of Caramanta, on the highway between Supía and La Pintada
- Uhuru, the first satellite specifically launched for x-ray astronomy, was put into orbit from the Italian-operated San Marco platform, erected off of the coast of Kenya. Built in the United States, Uhuru was "the first American satellite ever launched by scientists from another country" and the first satellite launch overseen by a female director. NASA engineer Marjorie Townsend was the director of the project.
- A U.S. Air Force B-57 Canberra reconnaissance airplane, filled with top-secret intelligence gathering equipment, crashed after being shot down by anti-aircraft guns while flying a mission over Laos. The Air Force reported that it believed that the equipment was destroyed on impact.
- Jim Morrison and The Doors performed together on stage for the last time, with Morrison experiencing a nervous breakdown while at The Warehouse, the primary rock venue in New Orleans. Morrison would record the album L. A. Woman with The Doors in March, before departing for a leave of absence in Paris, where he died on July 3.
- Enraged that his son Brian Spencer would not appear on Hockey Night in Canada because the CBC television network chose to broadcast a different National Hockey League game, Roy Spencer drove 84 miles (135 km) from his home in Fort St. James, British Columbia, to the closest CBC affiliate, CKPG-TV in Prince George and held technicians at gunpoint and demanded that they telecast the Toronto Maple Leafs game in which Brian was playing. After the game concluded, Roy was killed in a shootout with the Royal Canadian Mounted Police.
- Born:
  - Jennifer Connelly, American film actress and Academy Award winner for A Beautiful Mind; in Cairo, New York
  - Regina Hall, American actress and comedian; in Washington, D.C.
  - Bethany McLean, American investigative journalist; in Hibbing, Minnesota
- Died: John Paddy Carstairs, 60, British comedy film director

== December 13, 1970 (Sunday) ==
- Serial killer Dean Corll began the abduction and murder of schoolboys from locations in The Heights, a neighborhood in Houston, Texas. Although Corll had killed an 18-year-old college student, hitchhiker Jeffrey Konen, on September 25, Corll and his accomplice, David Brooks, began the killings when Brooks lured two 14-year-olds, James Eugene Glass and Danny Michael Yates, to their deaths from an evangelical rally at a neighborhood church. Six more boys, ranging in age from 13 to 17, would disappear in 1971, and Corll would murder seven boys and two men in 1972. Seven more children would vanish in 1973 before Corll's murder by Brooks on August 8 of that year. In all, 27 bodies would be found on Corll's property, including those of Glass and Yates; in response to criticism of the Houston Police Department for failing to notice the disappearances of children in the Heights, the police chief noted that it had received 5,200 reports of children running away from home over a two-year period, and 214 from The Heights in 1971.
- Died: Charles "Chick" Gandil, 82, American professional baseball player for the Chicago White Sox, known for persuading seven other teammates to participate in the Black Sox Scandal of 1919

== December 14, 1970 (Monday) ==
- The government of Poland announced large price increases that would take effect in January for food and for winter necessities, ranging from 15% to 25% for flour, meat, and cheese, as well as gloves, blankets and shoes. Earlier, the government had announced that no wage increases would be allowed during the year 1971. The average wage in Poland in 1970 was US$96 per month. The Polish government conceded that rioting had erupted in the city of Gdańsk, where at least five rioters and a policeman were killed, and in Gdynia and Sopot. Telephone operators refused to allow calls to the three cities, and Gdańsk was closed to travel as airplane flights were canceled and police roadblocks turned away all vehicles except for commercial trucks with special permits.
- U.S. President Nixon announced that former Texas Governor John B. Connally, who had switched from the Democratic Party to the Republican Party, would be the new U.S. Secretary of the Treasury, replacing David M. Kennedy.
- Died: The Viscount Slim, 79, British Army General and Governor-General of Australia from 1953 to 1960

== December 15, 1970 (Tuesday) ==
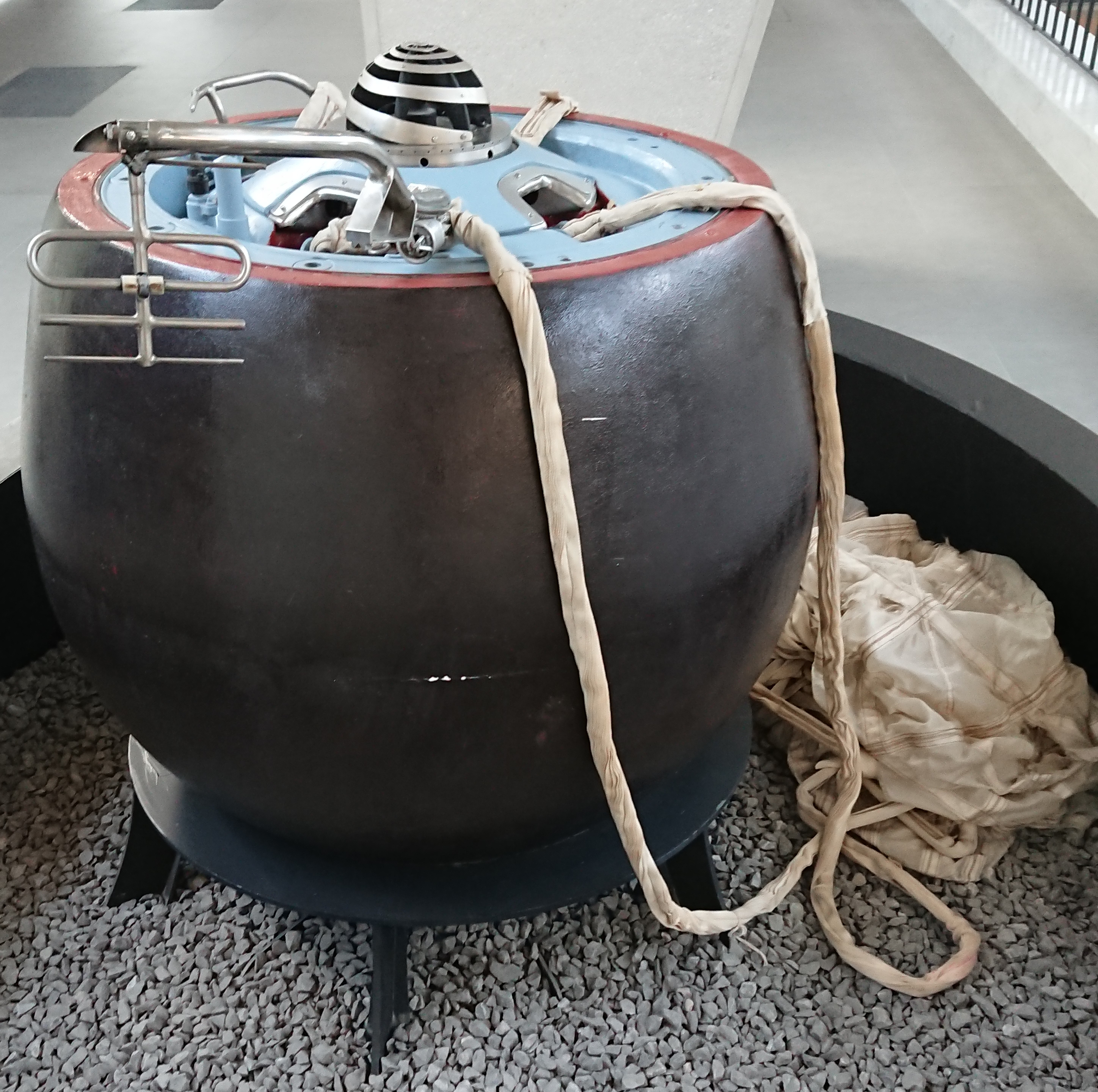
A model of the Venera-7 descent probe

- The USSR's Venera 7 became the first spacecraft to transmit data from the surface of the planet Venus. Information was transmitted for 35 minutes after the probe reached the Venusian atmosphere and a parachute opened to slow its descent. Unlike three previous probes that had reached Venus, Venera 7 was reinforced with an extra shield to give added protection against the temperature 198 °C (388 °F) and atmospheric pressure of almost 1,500 pounds per square inch (10,000 kPa) on the surface.
- As many as 325 people were killed when the South Korean ferry Namyoung-Ho capsized roughly 28 miles (45 km) offshore from the port of Yeosu in the Korea Strait.
- The sentence of life imprisonment for U.S. Marine PFC Michael A. Schwarz for the 1968 murder of 12 South Vietnamese civilians in the Son Thang massacre was ordered reduced by Major General Charles F. Widdecke. Private Schwartz, who was incarcerated at the U.S. Marine prison in Camp Pendleton, California, would be released six months later after his sentence was changed to dishonorable discharge and one year at hard labor, with credit for time served. A factor in the reduction was that Schwarz's commanding officer, who gave the order that resulted in the 12 deaths, had been acquitted.
- Died:
  - Sir Ernest Marsden, 81, English-born New Zealand physicist
  - Noboru Ogasawara, 82, Japanese physician and leprosy specialist

== December 16, 1970 (Wednesday) ==
- Love Story, the highest-earning film of the year, was released in theaters in the United States and Canada. The screenplay, written by Erich Segal, was adapted into a novel at the request of Paramount Pictures and had become the number one bestseller a few weeks before the film's release. Starring Ali MacGraw and Ryan O'Neal, the release was praised as "the Christmas gift of a movie" that "should bring joy to the millions of moviegoers sickened by the overdose of sex and drugs in the movies" and a film "rivaling air pollution as the greatest stimulant to the national tear duct"
- The Hague Hijacking Convention was signed by representatives of 40 of the 79 nations at the International Civil Aviation Organization conference in the Netherlands at The Hague
- The Ethiopian government declared a state of emergency in its province of Eritrea after alleging that foreign governments had been supplying weapons to the separatist Eritrean Liberation Front movement
- As construction on its upper levels continued, the World Trade Center opened for business as 25 employees of the North Tower's first two tenants reported for work at their new location. Export-Import Services, Inc., opened offices on the 10th floor and another export-import company, Irving R. Booty, Inc., opened on the 11th floor
- Outgoing U.S. Representative Martin B. McKneally, who had been defeated in his November re-election bid after revelations that he had failed to file income tax returns for four years, was indicted by a grand jury for tax evasion.

== December 17, 1970 (Thursday) ==
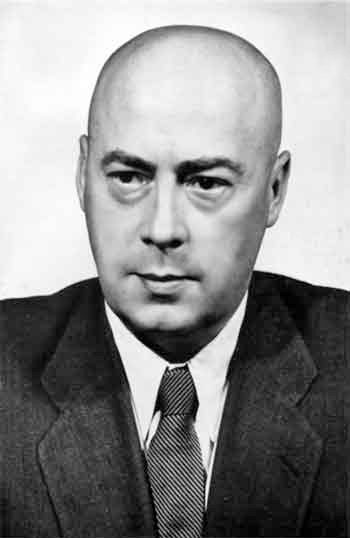
Cyrankiewicz

- Poland's Premier, Józef Cyrankiewicz, announced that he had authorized the People's Army of Poland to shoot at striking workers and demonstrators in an effort to suppress rioting. The decree signed by Cyrankiewicz cleared the way for the use of weapons against "persons applying violent plots against the life and health of the population and the robbing and destroying of property", and shipyard workers were fired upon in Gdynia By then, strikes had spread to the cities of Szczecin and Slupsk. Poland's government rescinded the shoot to kill order on December 22 and fired Cyrankiewicz the next day "Poles' Premier Resigns Post", Santa Cruz (CA) Sentinel, transferring him to a ceremonial position.
- Oman redesigned it's flag adding green and white horizontal bands to the old solid-red banner and incorporating the national emblem.
- Mohammad Hidayatullah the first Muslim Chief Justice of India, retired on his 65th birthday as required by the Indian Constitution, making his final decision the authorship of the majority opinion in an 8 to 3 ruling that restored rank, pay and privileges to 278 maharajas who had their income and title taken away by presidential order. Hidayatullah wrote that President V. V. Giri had attempted to exercise "political power transcending the constitution which he may exercise to the prejudice of the citizens" and added "Neither the paramountcy of the Grand Moghul nor the paramountcy of the British Crown has descended to him." As the new oldest member of the Supreme Court of India, Jayantilal Chhotalal Shah was sworn as the new Chief Justice. Noting that Shah had been born on January 22, 1906, The Guardian commented that "Every Buggins must have his turn. J.C. Shah... will hold exalted office for precisely 45 days."
- Born: Craig Doyle, Irish television sportscaster, in Wicklow

== December 18, 1970 (Friday) ==
- Codenamed "Baneberry", an errant underground nuclear test at the Nevada Test Site exposed 300 site workers to radiation— the largest number of test site workers to that time— after sending up a plume of radioactive dust 8,000 feet (2,400 m) high. In all, 600 workers were evacuated and screened. The cloud of dust slowly began moving north by northeast, but U.S. Atomic Energy Commission officials said that the levels of radioactivity were dropping rapidly. The closest inhabited site in the path of the cloud was Alamo, Nevada, with a population of 250 people living 10 miles (16 km) north of the northeast corner of the test site.
- Born:
  - Rob Van Dam (ring name for Rob Szatkowski), American professional wrestler and WWE champion; in Battle Creek, Michigan
  - DMX (stage name for Earl Simmons), American rapper and actor; in Mount Vernon, New York (d. 2021)

== December 19, 1970 (Saturday) ==
- General Chung Il-kwon was fired after more than six years as Prime Minister of South Korea, when President Park Chung-hee made the decision to shake up his cabinet in advance of general elections scheduled for May. President Park also dismissed his Justice Minister, Communications Minister and Agriculture and Forestry Member, and told the National Assembly that he would request the resignations of the other 16 members of his cabinet the following week. Baek Du-jin, who had served as Prime Minister at the close of the Korean War, was sworn in to replace General Chung.
- Born:
  - Tyson Beckford, African-American supermodel and TV show host; in Rochester, New York
  - Beverly Bond, African-American model and TV personality who created the annual Black Girls Rock! Awards for BET; in New York City
- Died:
  - Henry Bauchet, 91, French engineer and inventor who built the innovative La Sirène automobile in 1899, one of the first with metal rims and pneumatic tires and a hooded engine at the front of the vehicle.
  - Mozart Gurgel Valente, 53, Brazil's Ambassador to the United States since February, died of a stroke, the day after being admitted to an Arlington hospital.
  - Tom Graeff, 41, American film director known for Teenagers from Outer Space, committed suicide by carbon monoxide poisoning
  - May Singhi Breen, 79, American composer and educator known as "The Original Ukulele Lady" for her performances and promotion of music written for the ukulele

== December 20, 1970 (Sunday) ==
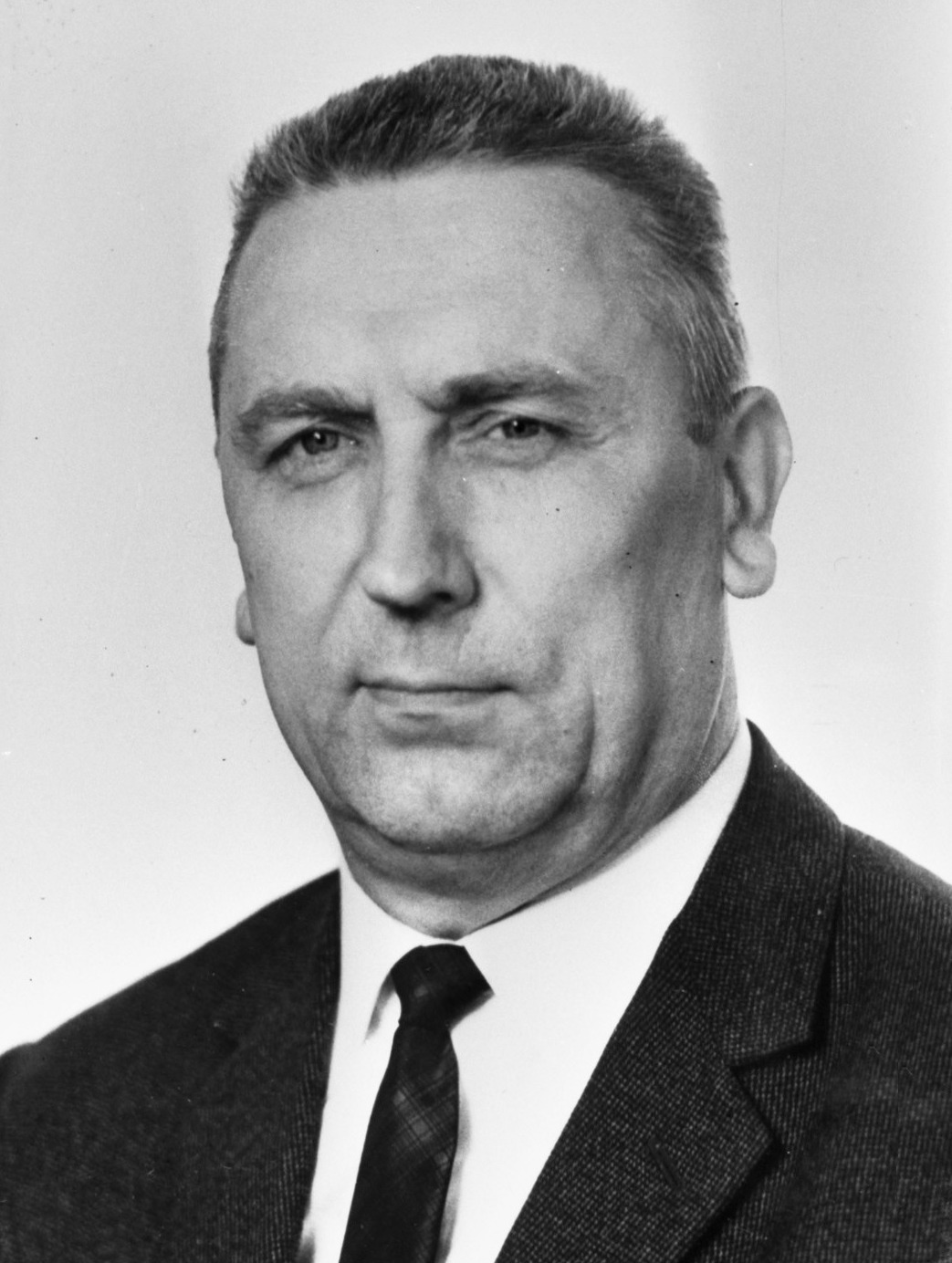
Gierek

- In the wake of the continued unrest in Poland, Communist leader Władysław Gomułka resigned as General Secretary of the ruling Polish United Workers' Party. Polskie Radio, the state-owned broadcaster, said that Gomulka had stepped down for reasons of health because he was "gravely ill". Edward Gierek, who fashioned the Party's economic policy, was named by the PWP Politburo to become the new General Secretary, and addressed the nation in the evening on television and radio. Promising change in the economic crisis that had caused the government to raise prices on consumer items, Gierek told listeners that "We are going together with the whole great Socialist community and chiefly with our tested friend and ally, the Soviet Union." Resigning along with Gomulka were Poland's president, Marian Spychalski, Economic Minister Boleslaw Jaszcuk, PWP ideologist Zenon Kliszko and Gomulka's chief aide, Ryzard Strzelecki. Gomulka would recover from his reported illness and live until 1982.
- Twenty-eight people were killed in a fire on the upper floors of the 12-story Pioneer International Hotel in Tucson, Arizona. The blaze began on the third floor of the Pioneer International Hotel and swept upward. People above the eighth floor of the hotel could not be rescued because the fire department ladders could not extend higher, but 650 people were able to escape. Louis Cuen Taylor, a 16-year-old high school student, would be tried as an adult and, more than a year later, convicted of 28 counts of murder After spending more than 40 years in prison, Taylor would be released on April 2, 2013, after lawyers working for the Arizona Justice Project were able to raise sufficient questions about whether the prosecution had failed to inform the defense team of possible exculpatory evidence
- The "Koza riot" took place at the U.S.-occupied Japanese island of Okinawa, after a drunken American soldier hit a passer-by with his car and slightly injured him. The incident acted as a catalyst of the tensions between the Okinawa citizens and the U.S. garrison. Over 70 cars with American license plates were torched, and the protesters invaded and damaged the Kadena Air Base. In all, 87 people (60 Americans and 27 Okinawans) were injured, and 82 people arrested.

== December 21, 1970 (Monday) ==
- By a margin of 5 to 4, the United States Supreme Court ruled in Oregon v. Mitchell that the federal government could not set requirements for voter qualifications in state and local elections, but that Congress could regulate the voting age in federal elections (specifically U.S. presidential elections and congressional elections), invalidating part of the 1970 amendments to the Voting Rights Act of 1965 that had lowered the minimum voting age to 18. While the practical effect of the ruling would have been that all but three states would have two sets of ballots for the 1972 elections— one for voters aged 18, 19 or 20 and another for voters 21 and older— the 1971 ratification of the 26th Amendment to the Constitution superseded Oregon v. Mitchell by lowering the voting age to 18 in all elections in the United States.
- Elvis Presley was welcomed to the White House by U.S. President Nixon. The meeting between the diverse celebrities would become the subject of several books and two films, Elvis Meets Nixon in 1997 and Elvis & Nixon in 2016. Despite the fame of both Nixon and Presley, the meeting was not reported in the media at the time and went unnoticed for more than a year until Jack Anderson's nationally syndicated newspaper column of January 27, 1972.

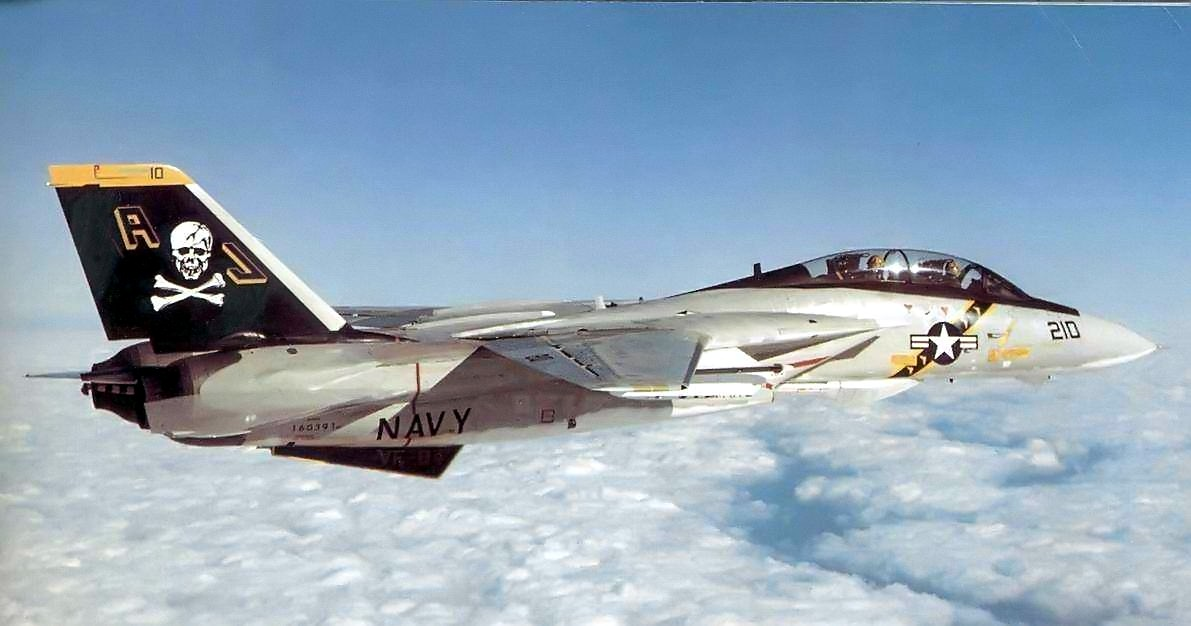
An early F-14

- The new U.S. Navy F-14 Tomcat made its first flight. Nine days later, the prototype F-14 was destroyed in a crash after taking off from the Grumman Corporation test facility near Calverton, New York. Test pilots William Miller and Robert Smyth were able to safely eject prior to the F-14's failure as it approached a landing.
- Born: Bart De Wever, Belgian politician, leader of the New Flemish Alliance; in Mortsel.
- Died:
  - Elyesa Bazna, 66, Nazi German spy who was code-named "Cicero" during World War II. Bazna served as the valet for Hughe Knatchbull-Hugessen, the British Ambassador to Turkey and, with access to the ambassador's private rooms, was able to regularly open the private safe and to photograph secret documents on microfilm to pass to German intelligence. Bazna had photographed the Allied plans and codes for the D-Day invasion of June 6, 1944 but German officials failed to pass the photographs along.
  - Anna Elisabet Weirauch, 83, German lesbian novelist

== December 22, 1970 (Tuesday) ==
- The Libyan Revolutionary Council declared that it would nationalize all foreign shareholdings in all banks and 60 percent of those in insurance companies in the north African nation.
- Franz Stangl, the SS commandant of the Treblinka extermination camp and the Sobibor extermination camp, was found guilty of the murder of 900,000 people during his administration. Stangl, who had avoided arrest until 1967 when he was picked up in Brazil, was sentenced to life imprisonment, but would serve only six months before dying on June 28, 1971.
- Representatives of the government of North Vietnam released their first accounting of American prisoners of war held in POW camps there, with a partial list of 368 names in "the closest thing yet to an official accounting by Hanoi".
- In a speech to the cardinals present at Rome, Pope Paul VI attacked Italy's new divorce law as a violation of the Lateran Treaty. The next day, Vatican reiterated its position in a note sent to the Italian government.
- In Italy, Enzo Barboni’s film They Call Me Trinity was released. The film launched the careers of Terence Hill and Bud Spencer and the so-called "beans western" (a parodic and bloodless version of the "Spaghetti Western").
- Born:
  - Ted Cruz (Rafael Edward Cruz), Canadian-born U.S. Senator and candidate for the Republican presidential nomination in 2016; in Calgary
  - Gary Anderson, Scottish professional darts player and two-time world champion; in Musselburgh, East Lothian
- Died: Vicente Gullas, 82, Philippine educator who founded the University of the Visayas as the Visayan Institute in 1919.

== December 23, 1970 (Wednesday) ==
- The Polish government announced a two-year moratorium on raising the price of food. Poland's parliament, the Sejm, unanimously approved the transfer of Premier Józef Cyrankiewicz to the largely ceremonial office of President (which had been vacated three days earlier by Marian Spychalski), replacing him as the head of government after his "shoot to kill" authorization that he had implemented during rioting. Replacing Cyrankiewicz as premier was deputy premier Piotr Jaroszewicz.
- The Bolivian government released Régis Debray, a French Marxist who had been a close associate of Che Guevara and had been in prison for three years. In the general amnesty announced by President Juan José Torres, the government also released another Guevara associate, Argentine painter Roberto Bustes. Both Debray and Bustes had been sentenced to 30 years in prison after their 1967 convictions.
- The North Tower of the World Trade Center in New York City was topped out to its full 110-story height when a 36 feet (11 m) steel column was locked into place at 11:30 in the morning, raising the incomplete structure's height to its goal of 1,370 feet (420 m), as the tallest building in the world. On October 20, the edifice's height had reached 1,254 feet (382 m) to surpass the Empire State Building.
- Law 70-001 was enacted under the direction of President Joseph Mobutu to make the Democratic Republic of the Congo a one-party state by amending article 4 of the African nation's constitution.
- The Garinei and Giovannini musical Alleluja, brava gente premiered at the Sistina Theatre in Rome, with Renato Rascel and Luigi Proietti.
- Mafia boss Luciano Leggio was sentenced by a court in Bari in absentia to life imprisonment for the murder of Michele Navarra and Giovanni Russo. It was the first major sentence for Leggio, who had previously evaded punishment for anything but minor crimes.
- Born:
  - Catriona Le May Doan, Canadian speed skater with five women's world championships and two Olympic gold medals; in Saskatoon, Saskatchewan
  - Shannon Bream, American attorney and television journalist known for being the anchor of Fox News Sunday, former Miss America and Miss USA contestant; in Tallahassee, Florida
  - Jeff Landry, American politician, Governor of Louisiana since 2024; in St. Martinville, Louisiana
- Died: Charles Ruggles, 84 American stage, film and television character actor and 1959 Tony Award winner

== December 24, 1970 (Thursday) ==
- Twenty-four civilian employees of the Indonesian state-owned oil company Pertamina were killed when their transport boat, Northern Dancer, collided in the Java Sea with the much larger Aquadud. Another 18 survivors were rescued. All of the dead, who were trapped inside Northern Dancer when it sank, had been on their way to their homes for the Christmas holiday; 15 were Indonesian citizens, but the casualties included Pertimina employees from the U.S., Singapore, Australia, France and Canada.
- The Basque separatist group ETA released Eugen Beihl after 23 days, turning him over to two men from West Germany's ZDF television network at an undisclosed location in Spain. The separatist group said in a statement that Biehl's abduction had served its purpose of calling worldwide attention to the trial of 16 ETA members.
- A Russian SFSR criminal court in Leningrad (now Saint-Petersburg) convicted nine of 11 Jewish defendants for their roles in an attempted hijacking, and sentenced two— Mark Dymshits and Edward Kuznetsov— to be executed. Following worldwide criticism for the death sentences, the Russian Republic's Supreme Court reduced the penalty to 15 years imprisonment six days later
- The Disney cartoon The Aristocats, one of the most popular films of 1971, premiered in theaters. The animated movie was the last project approved by Walt Disney prior to his death in 1966.
- Born: Adam Haslett, American writer; in Ryle, New York.
- Died: Nikolai Shvernik, 82, President of the Presidium of the Soviet Union from 1946 to 1953.

== December 25, 1970 (Friday) ==
- At its headquarters in Saigon, U.S. Defense Command announced that 23 Americans were killed in combat during the week running from December 12 to December 18, the lowest number of casualties in more than five years
- David Johnston, a British banker who had been the manager of the Shanghai office of Chartered Bank, was released by China after 28 months in jail. Johnston had been arrested by Chinese authorities in August, 1968, but was never charged with a crime. He was allowed to cross into Hong Kong on Christmas Day after signing a "letter of confession" that said that he had violated the laws of China.

== December 26, 1970 (Saturday) ==
- The prototype of China's lightweight supersonic fighter, the Nanchang J-12, made its first flight. The aircraft, designed by Lu Xiaopeng, would be tested for three years but never put into service.
- Paul Rose, the leader of the "Chernier Cell" of the Front de libération du Québec (FLQ), was arrested in a farmhouse in Saint-Luc, Quebec for the kidnapping and murder of Quebec Deputy Premier Pierre Laporte during Canada's October Crisis. Rose's brother Jacques Rose and another Chernier member, Francis Simard, were the last remaining suspects in the Laporte murder. Simard would be convicted of murder, and the Rose brothers would be convicted of being accessories after the fact. By 1982, all three had been released from incarceration.
- Born: James Mercer, American singer-songwriter, frontman of The Shins, in Honolulu, Hawaii
- Died: Lilian Board, 22, British athlete, died of cancer.

== December 27, 1970 (Sunday) ==
- At the St. James Theatre, Hello, Dolly!, the longest-running Broadway musical up to that time, closed after its 2,844th and final performance in New York. The show had surpassed My Fair Lady on September 9, 1969, and would be surpassed in turn by Fiddler on the Roof on July 21, 1971. Ethel Merman was the final actress to portray Dolly Levi. During its run on Broadway, which began on January 16, 1964, the role of Dolly had been played by Carol Channing, Ginger Rogers, Martha Raye, Betty Grable, Pearl Bailey and Phyllis Diller.
- At the request of Prime Minister Indira Gandhi, India's President V. V. Giri dissolved the 518-member Lok Sabha (the lower house of India's Parliament) and set new elections to take place during the first 10 days of March. In a nationwide TV and radio broadcast that evening, Gandhi explained that she and her cabinet of ministers had voted to hold the first midterm elections in India's history in order to seek "a fresh mandate" for the policies of her reorganized Indian National Congress party in advance of the scheduled January 1972 expiration of the five-year parliamentary term. According to the local press, the date of the dissolution of the Lok Sabha was set after Mrs. Gandhi had consulted with astrologers for a moment most favorable for the Congress party.

== December 28, 1970 (Monday) ==
- Six Basque separatists were sentenced to die before a firing squad, and 13 others were sentenced to imprisonment for terms ranging from 12 to 62 years, after being found guilty of murder by a Spanish military court at Burgos. Three of the six— Francisco Javier Izco, Eduardo Uriarte and Joaquin Gorostidi— received double death sentences in addition to prison time Only one of those charged was found not guilty. Under Spain's rules of military justice, the only right of appeal was to Spain's longtime dictator, Generalissimo Francisco Franco, who had the choice of confirming or commuting a death sentence. Once confirmed by Franco, an execution was promptly carried out by law at dawn the next day.
- The suspected killers of Pierre Laporte, Jacques and Paul Rose and Francis Sunard, were arrested near Montreal.
- Born: Yolanda Andrade, Mexican soap opera actress and TV host; in Culiacán, Sinaloa
- Died: L. Mendel Rivers, 65, U.S. Representative for South Carolina for almost 30 years and Chairman of the House Armed Services Committee. Rivers had undergone open heart surgery to replace a leaking mitral valve and had appeared to be recovering, but suffered a heart stoppage nine days after his operation

== December 29, 1970 (Tuesday) ==
- U.S. President Richard Nixon signed the Occupational Safety and Health Act (OSHA) into law. The House had approved the Act by a margin of 308 to 60 after its passage by the Senate.
- Born:
  - Aled Jones, Welsh singer and radio and television presenter, in Bangor
  - Kevin Weisman, American actor, in Los Angeles

== December 30, 1970 (Wednesday) ==
- Thirty-nine coal miners were killed by an explosion and carbon monoxide poisoning while at work at an underground mine operated by the Finley Coal Company near Hyden, Kentucky.
- The Poison Prevention Packaging Act of 1970, mandating child-resistant packaging for medicines and hazardous chemicals, was signed into law by U.S. President Nixon.
- Francisco Franco commuted the death sentences of the six Basque separatists scheduled for execution. The revision of the death sentences, to terms of 30 years' incarceration, came after 15,000 workers went on strike in the predominantly Basque province of Viscaya.
- The largest offshore fire in the history of oil exploration was extinguished after a month. The Royal Dutch Shell Oil Company announced that its B-21 well, which had been spilling oil into the Gulf of Mexico off the coast of New Orleans since an explosion that killed four employees, had been brought under control but that several smaller fires on an offshore drilling platform were continuing to burn.
- Died:
  - Sonny Liston, 40, American professional boxer and world heavyweight champion from 1962 to 1964
  - Lenore Ulric, 76, American stage and film actress

== December 31, 1970 (Thursday) ==
- Cuba announced the results of its September census and reported that its population was 8,553,395
- Paul McCartney filed a lawsuit against John Lennon, George Harrison and Ringo Starr in London to dissolve The Beatles's legal partnership.
- Two mergers of U.S. airlines were approved by President Nixon following the decision of the Civil Aeronautics Board, as American Airlines was allowed to purchase Trans Caribbean Airways and Northwest Orient Airlines acquired Northeast Airlines.
- Died:
  - Cyril Scott, 91, English musical composer
  - Hifz-ur-Rehman, Pakistani archaeologist
