= Adamkhan =

There are several locations named Adamkhan:

- Adamkhan, Armenia, a village
- De Adam Khan, a village in Helmand Province, Afghanistan
