= Adam Khan (disambiguation) =

Adam Khan is a British sportsman.

Adam Khan may also refer to:

- Adam Khan (Constitutional Loya Jirga) a delegate to Afghanistan's Constitutional Loya Jirga
- Adam Khan and Durkhanai
- Adam Khan (footballer) (born 2005), Pakistani footballer

== See also ==
- De Adam Khan, Afghanistan
- Adham Khan, general
