= Nimmi (Pakistani actress) =

Pakistani actress (1961–2008)

- نمی
- Born: Qamar Jehan; 6 July 1961; Lahore, Punjab, Pakistan
- Died: 3 June 2008 (aged 46); Lahore, Pakistan
- Other name: Qamar Meeno
- Occupation: Actress
- Years active: 1973 – 1990
- Children: 3
- Parent(s): Abdul Hafeez (father); Ameer Begum (mother)
- Relatives: Nusrat Ara (sister)

Qamar Jehan, also known as Nimmi (Urdu; نمی) (6 July 1961 – 3 June 2008) was a Pakistani actress. She acted in Urdu, Punjabi and Pashto films and is known for her roles in the films Daaman Ki Aag, Licence, Da Inteqam Lumbay, Inteqam Kay Sholay, Qatal Kay Baad, Puttar Tay Qanoon, Lahori Badshah, Sholay Peh Shola, Yadon Ki Barat, Insan and Aj Diyan Kurrian.

== Early life ==
Nimmi was born in Lahore, Punjab, Pakistan. Her mother Ameer Begum was also an actress.

== Career ==
Nimmi started acting in theater and later worked in several dramas on Pakistan Television (PTV). In 1974, she was cast in a supporting role by director Iqbal Akhtar in the film Anhoni and also appeared in the lead role in the film Asha Ke Deep.

Then she was visiting Evernew Studios in Lahore with her mother and there she met a studio producer who offered her a role in film which she accepted. She made her debut as Qamar Meeno in Punjabi film Chhad Buray Di Yaari later actor Badar Munir offered her a role in his Pashto film Navay da Yao Sshpay the film turned out to be a super hit at the box office. Ameer Begum changed Qamar Jehan's name to her professional name Nimmi as she liked Indian actress Nimmi so she changed her name to Nimmi.

Later she was cast by director Mumtaz Ali Khan's in his film Dulhan Ek Raat Ki was a hit at the box office and broke all previous records in terms of business.

Then she appeared in films Ham Dono, Yeh Adam, License, Sharif Ziddi, Aj Diyan Kurrian, Baray Mian Divanay, Takrao, Insan, Yadon Ki Barat and Mohabbat Aur Majboori.

She worked in more than fifty films throughout her career and she worked in Urdu, Pashto and Punjabi films.

Then she retired and went to live with her family at Lahore.

== Personal life ==
She got married in 1978 but her husband died in early 1980s and she has three children. Nimmi's elder sister Nusrat Ara was also an actress.

== Illness and death ==
She had liver cancer problem and died on June 3, 2008, in Lahore. She was buried at Karim Block Market graveyard in Allama Iqbal Town.

== Filmography ==
=== Television ===
Year	Title	Role	Network
1974	Twist	Beenish	PTV
1983	Chacha Chachi Gaye Karachi	Chachi	PTV

=== Film ===
Year	Film	Language
1973	Anhoni	Urdu
1974	Navay da Yao Sshpay	Pashto
1975	Chhad Buray Di Yaari	Punjabi
1975	Dulhan Ek Raat Ki	Urdu / Pashto
1976	Daaman Ki Aag	Urdu
1976	Licence	Punjabi
1976	Da Inteqam Lumbay	Pashto
1976	Inteqam Kay Sholay	Urdu
1977	Qatal Kay Baad	Urdu
1977	Puttar Tay Qanoon	Punjabi
1977	Lahori Badshah	Punjabi
1977	Sholay Peh Shola	Urdu / Pashto
1977	Yadon Ki Barat	Urdu
1977	Insan	Urdu
1977	Aj Diyan Kurrian	Punjabi
1977	Baray Mian Divanay	Urdu
1977	Teesri Qasm	Urdu
1978	Baap Ka Gunah	Urdu
1978	Tamashbeen	Punjabi
1978	Pagal Tay Pyar	Punjabi
1978	Sharif Ziddi	Punjabi
1979	Muqabla	Punjabi
1979	Shaheed	Pashto
1979	Multan Khan	Urdu / Pashto
1979	Badnam	Pashto
1980	Aakhri Nishan	Punjabi
1980	Ham Dono	Urdu
1980	Iqrar	Pashto
1980	Smuggler	Urdu
1980	Shabab	Pashto
1981	Aakhri Nakha	Pashto
1981	Mohabbat Aur Majboori	Urdu
1981	Azeem Qaum Ki Azeem Beti	Urdu
1982	Gull Sanga	Pashto
1982	Muqaddar	Pashto
1983	Nasoor	Pashto
1984	Yaar Dushman	Pashto
1984	Suhe Meenh	Pashto
1985	Darinda	Pashto
1985	Mashriq Maghrib	Urdu
1985	Da Veenay Daray	Pashto
1985	Da Plar Gunah	Pashto
1985	Sher Dil Khan	Pashto
1985	Aavaz	Pashto
1986	Da Veenay Karkha	Pashto
1986	Zama Qasm	Pashto
1986	Yeh Adam	Punjabi
1986	Da Vakht Badshah	Pashto
1986	Laram	Pashto
1988	Peeranagye	Pashto
1990	Meenh Ao Inteqam	Pashto
