= Yusuf Khan and Sherbano =

Pashtun folktale

Yusuf Khan and Sherbano is a famous Pashtun amorous folktale. Its format is an extended narrative described as qissa or dastan. It is listed along with Adam Khan and Durkhanai, Ramadad Khan, and Ajab Khan as one of the important Pashto dastans which are available as chapbooks or in audio formats. The tale has also been termed as the Pukhtun version of Romeo and Juliet.

== Development ==
The story of Yusuf Khan and Sherbano was put to verse by poet Ali Haidar Joshi (Joshi was a pen name) in the 1960s and was turned into a film, Yousuf Khan Sher Bano, released in 1970. The poem was translated into French by Benedict Johnson (in 1982) and into English by Heston and Nasir (in 1988). The story is transmitted by qissa-khwans, a term usually translated as "storytellers" who "say" or "sing" (Wayel) the verses. Joshi's account of the origin of the material is that he found a manuscript containing the story written in Persian at a local fair, when some medicine he bought was given to him wrapped in a page of the manuscript. He returned to the seller and obtained more of the manuscript. Joshi's account is given in a Lok Virsa tape recorded by Mumtaz Nasir in 1982.

== Content ==
The story has supernatural elements, such as five holy men (pirs) who give the heroine the ability to travel large distance in thirty steps, jinns who bring a woman and a bed to a mosque at night for the pleasure of a yogi. These elements suggest an influence to the story from outside the Pashtun culture. However, the social structures in the story, particularly the use as villains of paternal male cousins is typical to Pashtun stories, and many Pashtuns of various social classes identify the story as one of their own, according to ethnologist Wilma L. Heston.

== Film adaptation ==
The tale was adapted into a 1970 Pashto film, Yousuf Khan Sher Bano, produced by Nazir Hussain and directed by Aziz Tabassum. It is considered to be the first Pakistani Pashto film, and marked the start of the Pashto film industry.

== Translations ==
- Benedicte Johnson, Les contes legendaires pashtun: Analyse et traduction de cassettes commercialisees [Legendary tales in Pashto: Analysis and translation of commercial cassettes]. (1982) Memoire presente pour une maitrise d'etudes iraniennes [MA thesis], University of Paris
- Wilma Heston and Mumtaz Nasir. "The Bazaar of the Storytellers." (1988) Lok Virsa Publishing House, Islamabad, Pakistan
- Bibi Jaan, Yousaf Khan aw Sher Bano, Sahar, The Voice of Pashtuns, January 2011

== Historical Fiction ==
The legend has also been retold in English prose fiction. Changez Jan's novella The Ballad of Yousuf Khan and Sher Bano (2025) draws on the oral qissa/dastan tradition of the Peshawar Valley.
