= Adam Khan Dukhaniye =

- Starring: Badar Munir; Yasmin Khan
- Release date: 1971
- Country: Pakistan
- Language: Pashto

Adam Khan Dukhaniye is a Pollywood film of 1971. It stars Badar Munir and Yasmeen Khan in the lead roles.

== Cast ==
- Badar Munir
- Yasmin Khan
