= Yasmeen Khan (actress) =

Pakistani actress (1950–1999)

- Born: Peshawar
- Died: 15 April 1999
- Occupations: Actress, Dancer
- Television: Yousaf Khan Sherbano

Shamshad known by her alias Yasmeen Khan (1950, Peshawar – 15 April 1999, Peshawar) was a Pakistani actress. She was a popular actress who starred in many Pashto films. She was murdered on 15 April 1999.

== Personal life ==
Yasmeen was born as Shamshad in Kakshal, Peshawar in 1950 to Moeen Khan and Syed Bibi. In the 1960s, her family moved to Karachi where she was able to take up a role in her career's first film. Soon Yasmeen's popularity grew in films and she became a well known actress.

Yasmeen married fellow actor Saqi and had a daughter with him. Her second marriage was to Khuram Bari Malik, son of Bari Malik, the owner of Bari Studios, Lahore, which, however, did not last long. This union produced another daughter, Qurat-ul-Aeen. Her third marriage was with Arifullah, a business owner in Shoba Bazar, Peshawar.

== Career ==
Yasmeen Khan's career was launched when she played a lead role in the first Pashto movie to become a hit; Yousaf Khan Sherbano released in December 1970. Yasmeen acted with the Pashto actor Badar Munir and the pair became icons of Pashto films. She acted in more than 80 Pashto movies along with Badar Munir and 200 movies in her total career. Yasmeen Khan's first Urdu film, Dulhan Ek Raat Ki was released in 1975. The film's dance number Aaja aaja karle pyar, kehti hai suhani shaam brought much fame to Yasmeen Khan and soon she also started acting in Punjabi films like Hathkari (1976). In 1995, Yasmeen launched her film direction and production but due to little success in it, she left the work. After her third marriage, Yasmeen Khan distanced herself from the film industry because she felt that the industry was becoming vulgar and did not focus on Pashtun culture. Yasmeen withdrew herself from showbiz and turned towards religion. She tried to lead her husband, Arifullah; who was deep into gambling, to correct his ways but Yasmeen's efforts made him furious and he ended up killing her.

== Death ==
Khan was asleep when she was shot in the head by her husband, Arifullah and her room's door was locked. Her daughter Qurat-ul-Aeen discovered her mother's dead body and alerted the police. Arifullah was held suspect in her death but released after a few months. Arifullah was later murdered.

== Filmography ==
- Dehqan
- Yousaf Khan Sherbano (1970)
- Dulhan Aik Raat ki
- Adam Khan Durkhaniye (1971)
- Orbal- 1973
- Mitti Ke Putlay (1974)
- Mah Jabeen- 1972
- Jehan Barf Girti Hay- 1972
- Dil Walay- 1974
- Dosti Te Dushmanee- 1977
- Dameena Dameena - 1977
