= November 1970 =

Month of 1970

<<	November 1970					>>
Su	Mo	Tu	We	Th	Fr	Sa
1	2	3	4	5	6	7
8	9	10	11	12	13	14
15	16	17	18	19	20	21
22	23	24	25	26	27	28
29	30

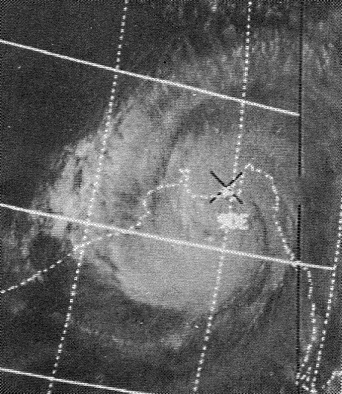
November 13, 1970: Cyclone kills over 300,000 people in East Pakistan; no survivors left on 13 islands south of the "X"

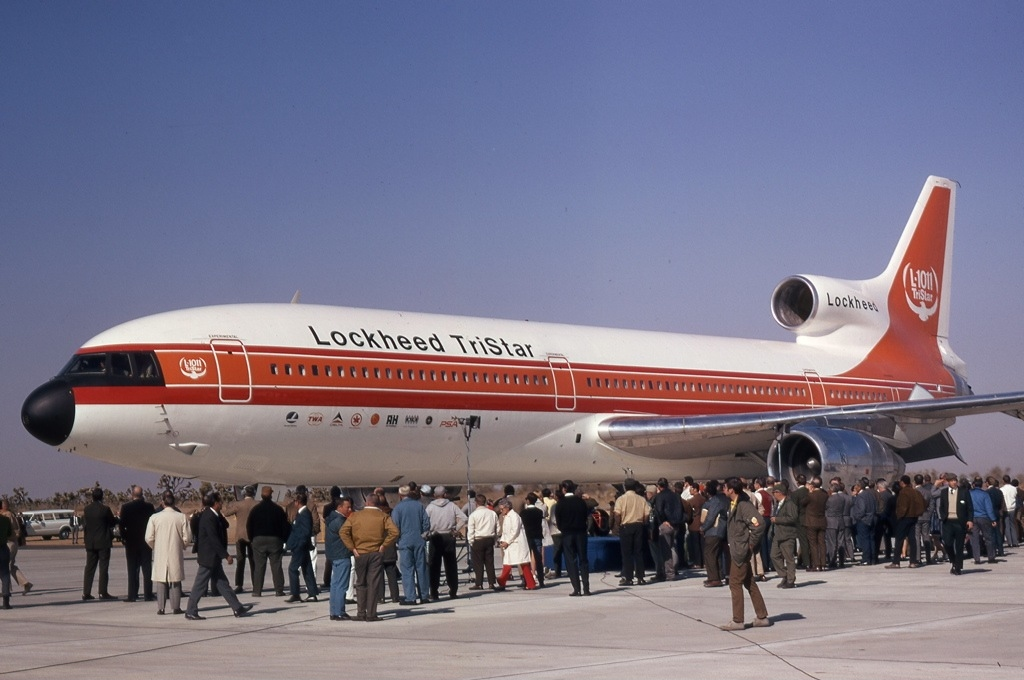
November 16, 1970: Lockheed L-1011 TriStar makes first flight

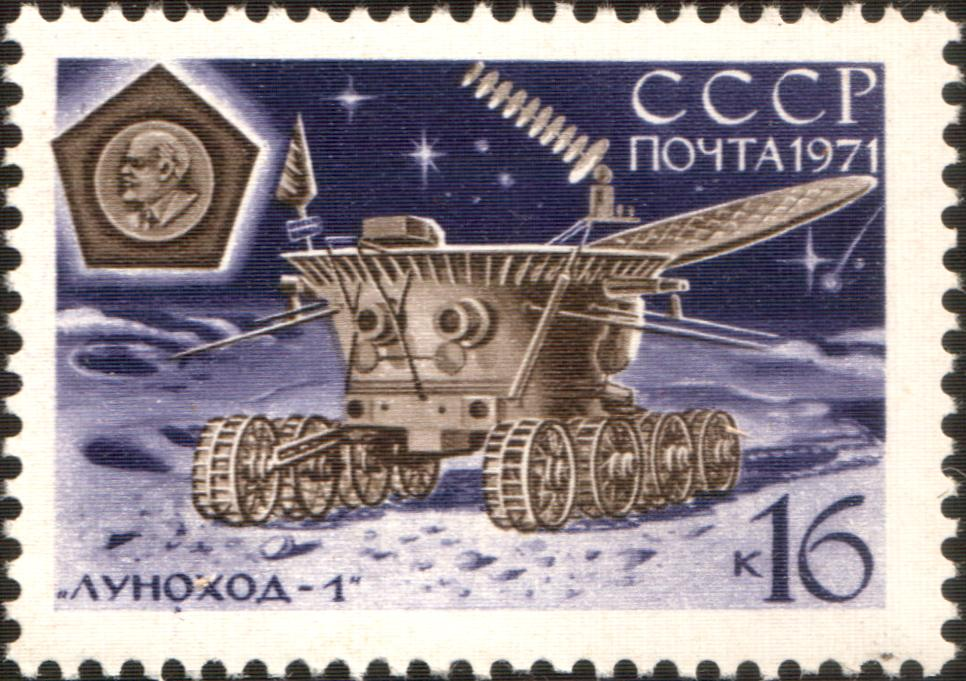
November 17, 1970: The uncrewed Soviet "bathtub-on-wheels" Lunokhod 1 becomes first rolling vehicle on the Moon

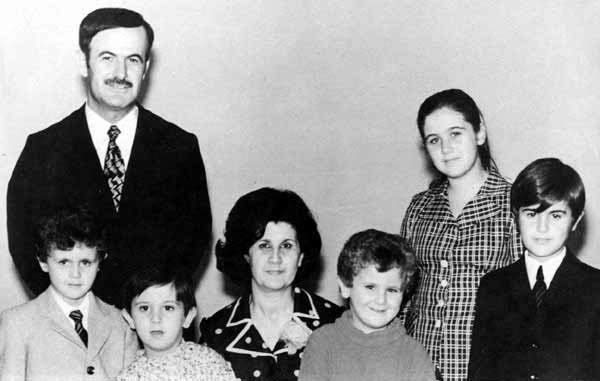
November 13, 1970: Hafez al-Assad begins three decade rule of Syria; his son Bashar al-Assad (lower left) would rule from 2000 until his overthrow in 2024

The following events occurred in November 1970:

== November 1, 1970 (Sunday) ==
- A fire killed 146 people at a dance hall outside of Saint-Laurent-du-Pont in France. Firefighters discovered upon arrival that the management of Club Cinq Sept had kept the emergency exits padlocked in order to keep people from entering the building without paying. At 1:45 in the morning, when the fire broke out, there were about 150 dancers still in the building who had paid to hear a performance by the rock group "The Storm". The dance hall was decorated with "paper and plastic psychedelic decorations" which caused the fire to spread rapidly, and firefighters in Saint-Laurent were only notified after two young men ran nearly a mile to the town to sound the alert. Witnesses told investigators that the fire had started after a patron had lit a cigarette and then tossed the burning match aside rather than extinguishing it.
- Zygfryd Wolniak, the Deputy Foreign Minister of Poland, and Chaudhri Mohammed Nazir, the deputy director of Pakistan's Intelligence Bureau (IB), were killed by a truck, along with two photographers, during an attempt to kill Poland's President Marian Spychalski at a welcoming ceremony in Karachi. The driver, who had stolen a cargo truck belonging to Pakistan International Airlines, reportedly shouted "Down with Communism" as he drove into the crowd, apparently mistaking Wolniak for Spychalski, then shouted "I have done my job!"
- Congo's President Joseph Mobutu won the yes-no vote for a 7-year term as president for the Central African nation. Balloting was not secret, and only 157 voted "no" against 10,131,669 who voted "yes".
- Born: Merle Palmiste, Estonian stage, film and TV actress, in Tallinn, Estonia; Toma Enache, Romanian film director, in Mihail Kogălniceanu, Romania

== November 2, 1970 (Monday) ==
- On the day before national elections, the United States Military Assistance Command in Vietnam made an early announcement that American soldier casualties were the lowest that they had been since 1965. The regular report was issued at its usual time on Thursday, and reported that 24 soldiers had been killed in the week of October 25 to October 31, but 431 soldiers were wounded.
- Dollree Mapp, the petitioner in the landmark U.S. Supreme Court case of Mapp v. Ohio that set the precedent for barring the use of illegally obtained evidence in a criminal prosecution, was arrested by police in New York City on a search warrant, and found to have over $10,000 worth of heroin and over one million dollars in stolen merchandise, including antiques, silver, televisions sets and furs.
- Died:
  - Richard Cushing, 75, Roman Catholic Archbishop of Boston and cardinal
  - Abram Besicovitch, 79, Russian-born British mathematician, known for the Besicovitch covering theorem
  - Fernand Gravey, 54, Belgian-born American and French film actor

== November 3, 1970 (Tuesday) ==
- Marxist Salvador Allende was inaugurated as the 28th President of Chile, receiving the traditional presidential sash from his predecessor, Eduardo Frei. Elected for a term of six years, Allende would die in a military coup less than three years later.
- In U.S. midterm elections for the Congress, the Democrats lost four seats in the Senate, narrowing their majority to 53 of the 100 seats, but gained 12 seats in the House to strengthen their majority to 255 of the 435 seats.
- Died: Peter Karadordevic, 47, the last King of Yugoslavia, who reigned as King Peter II until he was deposed in 1945, died at a U.S. hospital in Los Angeles. His 25-year-old son, British Army Lieutenant Alexander Karadordevic, announced at his father's memorial service on November 8 that he had no intention of becoming a "king-in-exile".

== November 4, 1970 (Wednesday) ==
- Test pilot André Turcat of France's Sud Aviation company flew the prototype of the Concorde supersonic airliner over the Atlantic Ocean at a record speed for a commercial aircraft, reaching Mach 2 and averaging 1,370 miles per hour (2,200 km/h) for nearly 50 minutes. Flying at 52,500 feet (16,000 m) over the ocean, he reached a maximum speed of 1,404 miles per hour (2,260 km/h) in Concorde 001 before returning to Toulouse. On the same day, British Aircraft Corporation (BAC) test pilot Brian Trubshaw tested the capabilities of the other prototype in the joint venture, Concorde 002, but had to return early after a warning light indicated an engine fire. The Concorde would begin regular service in 1976 by British Airways and Air France, but all other airlines canceled their orders for Concorde jets because of environmental concerns, and no Concorde has been flown since 2003.
- Social workers in Los Angeles took custody of a 13-year-old victim of child abuse identified in studies by the pseudonym "Genie". She had been kept in confinement to one room by her father since her birth, until her mother finally took her from the home in October. Though her rescue was not publicized at the time, the case of "Genie", who had not learned how to communicate, would become a landmark in the study of linguistics, psychology and education of a feral child.
- As part of its policy of Vietnamization, the United States turned control of an air base to the control of South Vietnam for the first time, releasing the Sóc Trăng Airfield to the Army of the Republic of Vietnam, along with 31 American helicopters.

== November 5, 1970 (Thursday) ==
- The Roman Catholic Church's Congregation for Divine Worship announced a continuance of the tradition that barred women from serving as acolytes to assist the priest during services, but, in following the reforms from the Second Vatican Council ("Vatican II") that concluded in 1965, directed that women could allow non-Gospel scripture reading during mass, lead the congregation in singing, and perform other tasks.

== November 6, 1970 (Friday) ==
- Rock musicians Steven Tyler, Joe Perry, Ray Tabano, Tom Hamilton and Joey Kramer performed their first concert as Aerosmith, appearing at Nipmuc Regional High School in Mendon, Massachusetts.
- Charlie Hentz, a 225 lb (102 kg) rookie for the Pittsburgh Condors of the American Basketball Association, shattered both of the glass backboards at Dorton Arena in Raleigh, North Carolina, in a game against the Carolina Cougars. In the game's second quarter, Hentz made a two-handed dunk to give Pittsburgh a 37–35 lead, but delaying the game for an hour. Then, with 1:07 left to play in the game, and the Cougars holding a 17-point lead, Hentz made another dunk and shattered the backboard on the other side of the court. The teams then elected to end the game early rather than to play the final 67 seconds, and the Cougars won, 122 to 107.
- Born: Ethan Hawke, American film and stage actor, novelist and director; in Austin, Texas
- Died: Agustín Lara, 73, Mexican bolero music composer

== November 7, 1970 (Saturday) ==
- Royal Caribbean Cruise Line, now the highest grossing ocean liner service in the world, made its first voyage as passengers boarded the company's original ship, MS Song of Norway, departed from Miami at 6:00 in the evening for a seven-day round-trip tour with stops at the Bahamas, Puerto Rico, and the Virgin Islands.
- Over objections from the U.S. Department of Defense, U.S. President Nixon issued a National Security Decision Memorandum (NSDM-92) changing U.S. policy in the Persian Gulf from balancing aid among gulf nations to one favoring Iran and making the Shah of Iran the closest U.S. ally in the region.
- The first match between two schools of the recently developed Frisbee-disc game of Ultimate took place at the parking lot of Columbia High School (where the game had originated) in Maplewood, New Jersey against visiting Millburn High School. Columbia High won, 43 to 10.
- Born: Morgan Spurlock, American documentary filmmaker and humorist known for Super Size Me; in Parkersburg, West Virginia

== November 8, 1970 (Sunday) ==
- Following a joint meeting between their presidents in Cairo, the governments of Egypt, Libya and Sudan announced that they would take steps to create a federation of the three nations into a united north African Arab republic of 50,000,000 people. The notice came following the conference between Anwar Sadat of Egypt, Muammar Gaddafi of Libya and Gaafar Nimeiry of Sudan. At 4,622,000 square miles (11,970,000 km^{2}) the proposed federation, which never took place, would have been the seventh largest nation in the world.
- Tom Dempsey, the placekicker for the New Orleans Saints kicked from his team's 37-yard line to set an NFL record with a 63-yard field goal, giving his team at 19–17 win over the visiting Detroit Lions on the last play of the game. One of the Lions commented afterward, "Tom Dempsey didn't kick that field goal, God kicked it." Dempsey, who had turned the handicap of being born without toes on his right foot, wore a special shoe. At the end of the season, he graciously accepted the "Bonehead of the Year Trophy", normally voted to an athlete whose mistake cost a team a victory, for the game winning score that "booted the Saints out of getting pro football's No. 1 draft pick".
- The British comedy television series, The Goodies, debuted at 10:00 in the evening on BBC Two.
- Born: Tom Anderson, American computer programmer and entrepreneur who co-founded the social network Myspace; in San Diego
- Died: Napoleon Hill, 87, best-selling American self-help book known for his 1937 work Think and Grow Rich

== November 9, 1970 (Monday) ==
- The Supreme Court of the United States voted, 6–3, against bypassing the lower federal courts in order to hear a petition filed by the Commonwealth of Massachusetts against the United States, regarding the constitutionality of the Vietnam War. A law passed by Massachusetts allowed state residents the right to refuse military service in an undeclared war. The vote was unusual in that usually activist justices Thurgood Marshall and William J. Brennan Jr. sided with the majority, and conservative justices Potter Stewart and John Marshall Harlan II, like activist William O. Douglas, voted in the minority. The majority ruling said only that "The motion for leave to file a bill of complaint is denied", and Douglas's dissent (which Stewart and Harlan declined to concur with) stated that "It is far more important to be respectful to the Constitution than to a co-ordinate branch of government", a reference to a White House request that the Supreme Court not consider the controversial issue while U.S. troops were still fighting in Vietnam.
- The Soviet Union launched Luna 17, a lunar lander which carried the first wheeled vehicle to the Moon.
- The blues rock studio double album Layla and Other Assorted Love Songs, the only studio album by Derek and the Dominos, was released, initially in the United States, the first presentation of the classic title track, "Layla", by English guitarist Eric Clapton and American drummer Jim Gordon.
- Born:
  - Chris Jericho (ring name for Christopher K. Irvine), American professional wrestler; in Manhasset, New York
  - Scarface (stage name for Brad Jordan), American rapper; in Houston
- Died: Charles de Gaulle, 79, President of France 1959 to 1969 and French Army General who led the Free French fight against the Nazis after the fall of France

== November 10, 1970 (Tuesday) ==
- The Soviet Union released U.S. Army Major General C. D. Scherrer and Brigadier General Claude M. McQuarrie Jr., who had been held captive since October 21, when the pilot of their U-8 Seminole had mistakenly landed in the Armenian SSR during a flight in Turkey. Released with the generals were Turkish Army Colonel Cevat Denli and the plane's pilot, U.S. Army Major James P. Russell, who had been flying in bad weather to the Turkish border town of Kars and had touched down instead in Leninakan (now Gyumri in Armenia) 40 miles (64 km) to the east.
- Born:
  - Warren G (stage name for Warren Griffin III), American rapper; in Long Beach, California

== November 11, 1970 (Wednesday) ==
- The Convention on the Non-Applicability of Statutory Limitations to War Crimes and Crimes Against Humanity went into effect 90 days after a tenth state had ratified it. The convention had been adopted by the UN General Assembly on November 26, 1968, and provided that nations that abided by the convention would allow the extradition of people indicted for participating in genocide, regardless of what the time limit was in the nation for prosecuting murder. At the time of its effectiveness, only Communist nations had agreed to it, starting with Poland, followed by the Soviet Union, the Byelorussian SSR and Ukrainian SSR (both Soviet Republics separate General Assembly members), Czechoslovakia, Yugoslavia, Bulgaria, Hungary, Mongolia and Romania being the first ten. No western European nation has signed or ratified the convention, nor have the United States, China, or Canada.

== November 12, 1970 (Thursday) ==
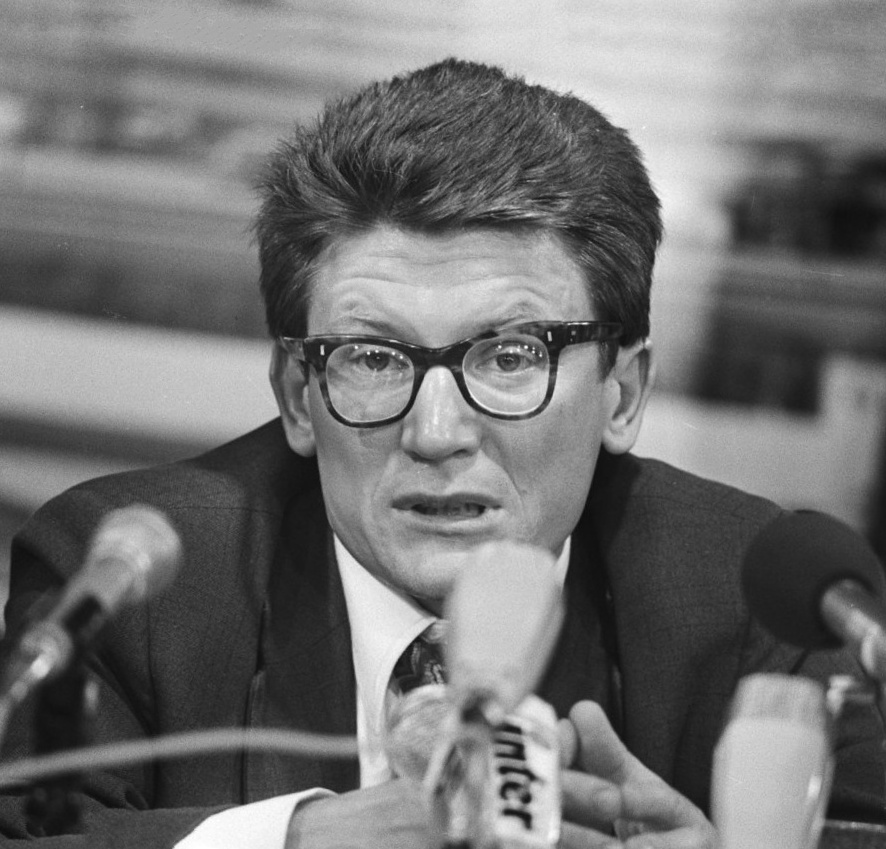
Amalrik

- Soviet author Andrei Amalrik was sentenced to three years in a labor camp for "distributing anti-Soviet concoctions". Amalrik, who had been arrested on May 21 for writing the book Will the Soviet Union Survive Until 1984? had been given the maximum sentence under a recently enacted law. His co-defendant at the trial in the closed city of Sverdlovsk, Lev G. Ubozhko, received the same sentence for circulating mimeographed copies of Amalrik's book and other anti-Soviet literature among university students. Amalrik would be held for another year at the "reinforced regime" level internment camp even after completing his three-year sentence. He would pass away in 1980 and the Soviet Union would survive for only seven more years after 1984.
- Born:
  - Tonya Harding, American figure skater, boxer and reality TV personality known for controversy in the 1994 Winter Olympics; in Portland, Oregon
  - Cachita (stage name for Alina María Hernández), Cuban-born transgender actress; as Alberto Hernandez (d. 2016)

== November 13, 1970 (Friday) ==
- Over 300,000 people were killed by a cyclone that struck East Pakistan (now Bangladesh) in one of the worst disasters of the 20th century. Bhola Island, whose highest point was only six feet (1.8 meters) above sea level, and Hatiya Island were washed over by the Bay of Bengal. Radio Pakistan said three days after the disaster that 13 densely populated islands had lost their entire population. The death toll may have been as high as 500,000 but there were no census records for the area that was struck.
- Air Marshal Hafez al-Assad, the Defense Minister of Syria, led a military coup within the ruling Ba'ath Party, then announced the overthrow and arrest of President Nureddin al-Atassi. The coup came one day after an emergency congress of the Party had adopted a resolution to fire Assad from his position. Assad would rule Syria for more than 29 years until his death in 2000. His son, Bashar al-Assad, five years old at the time of the coup, would rule as Syria's president for 24 years until his overthrow on December 8, 2024.

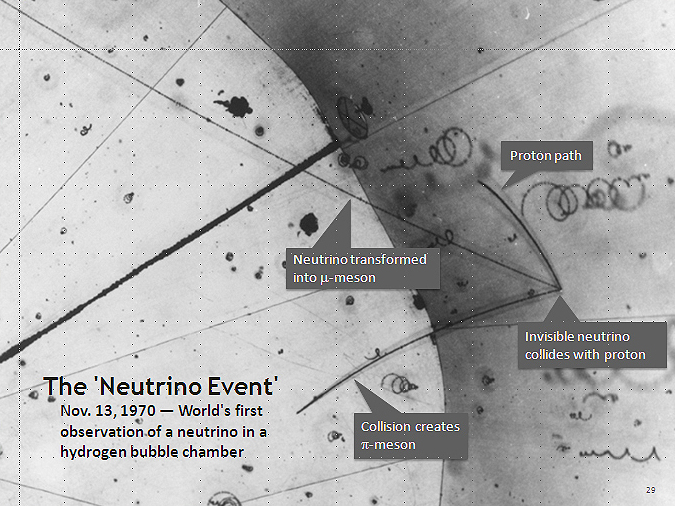
The "Neutrino Event"

- "The Neutrino Event", the first photographic evidence of the subatomic neutrino, was recorded at the Argonne National Laboratory in Lemont, Illinois, as scientists used a hydrogen bubble chamber view the collision of a neutrino with a proton to create a pi meson or pion.
- The Place de l'Etoile, location of the Arc de Triomphe and meeting place of 12 streets in Paris, was renamed Place Charles de Gaulle in honor of the late French President.
- Died: Bessie Braddock, British politician (b. 1899)

== November 14, 1970 (Saturday) ==
- Southern Airways Flight 932 crashed into a hillside near Kenova, West Virginia, killing all 75 people aboard, including 37 players and 5 coaches from the Marshall University football team. The twin engine DC-9 airplane was making its approach to Huntington, bringing back the team and its supporters from Greenville, North Carolina, where the Marshall Thundering Herd had lost to East Carolina University, 17–14, when it struck treetops on a high ridge one mile from the Huntington Airport's runway 11. The final NTSB investigation concluded that Flight 932, for unknown reasons, was flying below minimum descent altitude during its approach and that the most likely explanation was either a misunderstanding of the instrument data or a defect in the plane's altimeter.
- The Soviet Union entered the International Civil Aviation Organization (ICAO) after having resisted outside influence on its airspace for more than 25 years. Russian became the fourth official language of the ICAO (after English, French and Chinese).

== November 15, 1970 (Sunday) ==
- Residents of neighborhoods built around the Seminole Center Mall assembled at the mall and voted overwhelmingly to incorporate the city of Seminole, Florida, located between St. Petersburg and Clearwater. With at least 667 registered property owners needing to approve, the vote was 823 to 72 to create the new municipality.
- Born:
  - Patrick M'Boma, Cameroonian national soccer football striker; in Douala
  - Jack Ingram, American country music artist; in Houston
- Died: Konstantinos Tsaldaris, 86, former Prime Minister of Greece in 1946 and 1947

== November 16, 1970 (Monday) ==
- The Lockheed L-1011 TriStar, the company's version of the "jumbo jet", flew for the first time. Test pilot Hank Dees and his three crewmates lifted off from the corporate testing center in Palmdale, California, at 7:56 in the morning and flew for almost two and a half hours before landing. The jet could seat as many as 300 passengers and joined the aviation market as competition for the Boeing 747 and the McDonnell Douglas DC-10.
- Soviet newspapers quoted former Communist Party leader and Premier Nikita S. Khrushchev for the first time since Khrushchev's removal from office in 1964, as the Soviet news agency TASS printed a response to LIFE magazine's November 6 announcement that his memoirs would soon be published. Khrushchev was quoted as saying that "It is evident from reports of the press in the United States and some other capitalist countries that the so-called memoirs or reminiscences of N.S. Khrushchev are now being prepared for publication. This is a fabrication and I am indignant at this. I have never passed on memoirs or materials of this nature, either to Time or other foreign publishing houses. I did not turn over such materials to the Soviet publishing houses either. Therefore, I declare that this is a fabrication. The venal bourgeois press has many times been exposed in such lies."

== November 17, 1970 (Tuesday) ==
- The Soviet Union landed Lunokhod 1 on Mare Imbrium (Sea of Rains) on the Moon. Lunokhod, the first wheeled vehicle to land on another world, was released after Luna 17 made a soft landing. The eight-wheeled vehicle, nicknamed the "bathtub on wheels" by the Western press, was equipped with television cameras and scientific equipment, and could be controlled remotely from Earth.
- The court-martial of U.S. Army Lieutenant William L. Calley, for the My Lai Massacre, began at Fort Benning, Georgia. An Army prosecutor said in an opening statement to the six board members that Lt. Calley and soldiers under his command had killed 102 civilians on March 16, 1968.

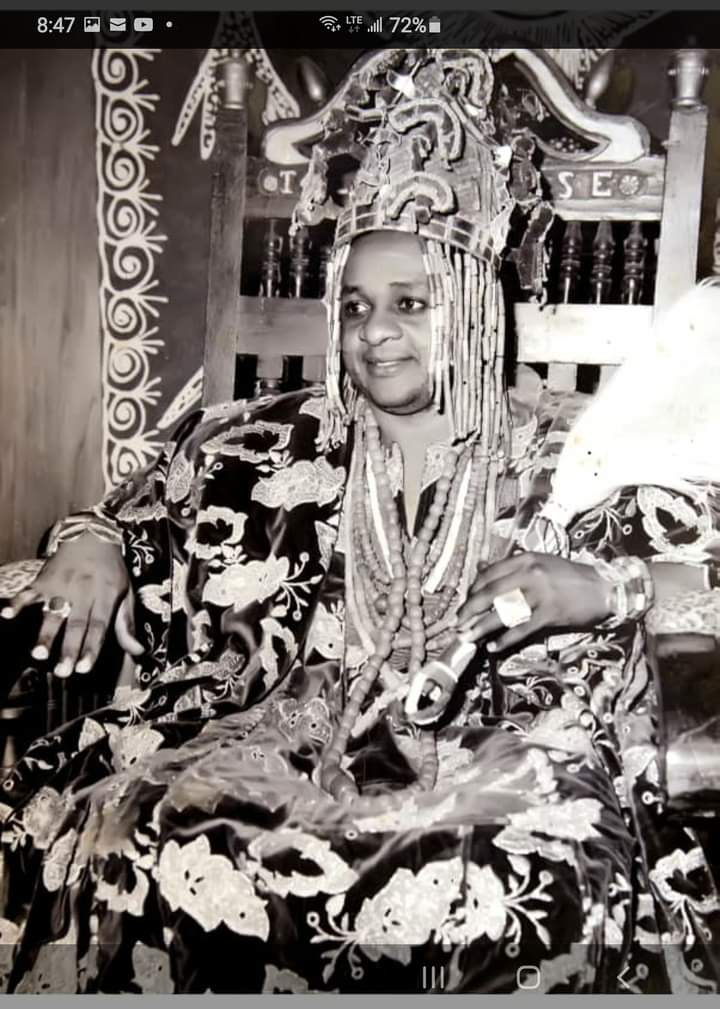
King Adeyemi III of the Yoruba

- In an elaborate ceremony in Nigeria, Yoruba politician Lamidi O. Adeyemi was crowned as Adeyemi III the traditional king (oba) of the 9.3 million Yorubas in Nigeria, the Alaafin of Oyo. Adeyemi III was recognized by tribal elders as the legitimate heir to rulership of the Oyo Empire which once ruled Yorubans in what would become western Nigeria and southern Benin. Adeyemi III would reign for almost 52 years until his death on April 22, 2022.

== November 18, 1970 (Wednesday) ==
- In Warsaw, the foreign ministers of Poland and West Germany initialed a peace treaty between the two nations, with West Germany formally acknowledging Poland's ownership of 40,000 square miles (100,000 km^{2}) of former German territory east of the Oder and Neisse rivers. The Communist governments of Poland and East Germany had previously agreed that the Oder-Neisse line was the boundary between their nations.
- In a special message to Congress, U.S. President Richard Nixon asked for an appropriation of an additional one billion dollars for foreign aid, declaring "We must signal clearly to the world... that the United States will help those who demonstrate their determination to help themselves." While almost half of the US$1.035 billion was earmarked to assist Israel and $150 million to South Korea, Nixon asked for another $155 million to prop up the government of Cambodia in its fight against the Khmer Rouge and North Vietnam.
- Born: Peter Dutton, Australian politician, Leader of the Opposition and Leader of the Liberal Party of Australia since 2022; in Boondall, Queensland

== November 19, 1970 (Thursday) ==
- The policy of European Political Cooperation (EPC) began with the first meeting of the foreign ministers of the six European Community member states (Belgium, France, Italy, Luxembourg, the Netherlands and West Germany), taking place in Munich to pursue goal of having a unified foreign policy for the future European Union.
- Died: Marshal Andrey Yeryomenko, 78, Ukrainian-born Soviet military office who guided the successful defense of Stalingrad during World War II.

== November 20, 1970 (Friday) ==
- The Miss World 1970 beauty pageant, hosted by Bob Hope at the Royal Albert Hall, London was disrupted by women's liberation protesters who hurled leaflets, smoke bombs and "stink bombs" on stage. Emcee Bob Hope left the stage temporarily, muttering "Who are these bastards?", until police cleared the hall, then crowned Jennifer Hosten of Grenada as "Miss World". Earlier on the same evening a bomb was placed under a BBC broadcast vehicle by The Angry Brigade, in protest at the entry of separate non-white and white contestants by South Africa. Pearl Jansen, the non-white representative designated "Miss Africa South", was the runner-up in the Miss World contest. By the weekend, a scandal emerged that Miss Grenada had been eliminated in the quarter-finals and that, even after being included in the final voting, finished second to Miss Sweden. Sir Eric Gairy, Prime Minister of Grenada, was one of the nine judges.
- Born: Phife Dawg (stage name for Malik Taylor), American rap artist, in Queens borough, New York City (d. 2016)

== November 21, 1970 (Saturday) ==
- Carrying out Operation Ivory Coast, a joint U.S. Air Force and U.S. Army team entered North Vietnam shortly after midnight local time (1700 UTC 20 November, 2:00 in the afternoon in Washington) and raided the Son Tay prison camp in Hanoi an attempt to free American POWs thought to be held there. When U.S. helicopters arrived at the camp, located 23 miles (37 km) west of Hanoi, the rescuers discovered that the prisoners had already been moved to a handful of central prison complexes before the raid. Despite the failure, one of the POWs, U.S. Navy Commander Claude D. Clower, would later say upon his return in 1973 that the raid was "a turning point" for the prisoners because "all air crews captured were taken to the single camp in Hanoi. And being in the same place, were able to organize ourselves under a command structure for the first time," as well as to work out plans for communication with each other.
- In Ethiopia, the Eritrean Liberation Front ambushed and killed Major General Teshome Erghetu, the commander of the 2nd Division of the Ethiopian Army and the highest-ranking officer to die in the ongoing Eritrean War of Independence.
- Elections for the half of the 60 Australian Senate seats were held, the coalition government of the Liberal Party and Country Party, led by Prime Minister John Gorton, and the Labor Party led by Gough Whitlam, each lost elections and ended up with 26 seats, both short of a majority in the 60-member body. Winning an additional seat, the Democratic Labor Party (DLP) held only five seats, but had the balance of power in the Senate.
- Life magazine published its first excerpts from the upcoming book Khrushchev Remembers as its November 27 issue went on sale, memoirs that had been dictated by the former Soviet premier and then smuggled out of the Soviet Union by family and sympathizers.
- Died:
  - Sir C. V. Raman, 82, Indian physicist and 1930 Nobel Prize winner
  - Percy Schramm, 76, German historian

== November 22, 1970 (Sunday) ==
- Guinean president Ahmed Sékou Touré accused Portugal of an attack when hundreds of mercenaries land near the capital, Conakry, and asked for help from the United Nations. Portugal denied sending troops to the West African nation; without addressing which nation's troops were involved, the UN Security Council voted unanimously to demand the immediate withdrawal of any foreign troops from Guinea and to send a mission to assess the situation, but declined to send troops. The attack was apparently in retaliation for the support that Toure's government was providing for the neighboring colony of Portuguese Guinea.
- Born:
  - Stel Pavlou, British screenwriter and novelist; in Gillingham, Kent
  - Joe Son (Son Hyung-min) South Korean-born U.S. martial artist, film actor (known for portraying "Random Task" in the film Austin Powers) and convicted criminal; in Gwangju

== November 23, 1970 (Monday) ==
- Simas Kudirka, a Lithuanian radio operator of the Soviet fishing trawler Sovetskaya Litva, jumped on board the U.S. Coast Guard cutter Vigilant while the two vessels were tied up alongside each other at Aquinnah, Massachusetts, on the Martha's Vineyard island. Rather than granting Kudirka political asylum, the Coast Guard instead returned Kurdirka to Soviet custody at the end of the day, prompting protests against the Guard by fishing industry leaders. President Nixon announced one week later that he would ask for a full investigation of the Coast Guard's actions and the White House confirmed that the commander of the Coast Guard District in Boston had made the decision to deny sanctuary. After being sentenced upon to 10 years in a labor camp upon his return to the USSR, Kudirka would be allowed to emigrate to the U.S. in November, 1974, along with his wife and two children.
- Pope Paul VI ruled that Roman Catholic cardinals who were 80 years old or older would not be allowed to participate in the next election for a pontiff. The reform, effective January 1, 1971, disenfranchised 25 cardinals born in or before 1890. Most of those barred were known for their conservative views, and 11 of the 25 were Italian. The New York Times noted that the move, which reduced the number of Italian members of the College of Cardinals from 38 of 127 to 27 of 102, "increases the chances for the new Pope to be non-Italian", something that had last happened almost 450 years earlier, when Pope Adrian VI of the Netherlands was elected in 1523. While Pope John Paul I, the Pope immediately after Paul VI in 1978, would be Italian cardinal Albino Luciani, his successor Pope John Paul II would be cardinal Karol Wojtyla of Poland
- Born: Zoe Ball, English TV show host; in Blackpool, Lancashire
- Died: Yusof Ishak, 60, the President of Singapore since the nation became independent in 1965. Dr. Yeoh Ghim Seng, a surgeon, temporarily served as acting president until a new president could be selected.

== November 24, 1970 (Tuesday) ==
- Kosmos 357, the Soviet Union's first test of a lunar module ascent stage for a possible crewed mission to the Moon, was launched and proved to be a success. Two follow-up tests took place successfully on February 26 and August 12, but the expenses for the development and production of the powerful N1 rocket would eventually lead to the end of the Soviet crewed lunar exploration project.

== November 25, 1970 (Wednesday) ==
- Tatenokai militia leader and novelist Yukio Mishima (a pen name for Kimitake Hiraoka), along with four followers, took over the eastern headquarters of the Japan Self-Defense Forces in Ichigaya in an attempted coup d'état. After Mishima's speech failed to sway public opinion toward his right-wing political beliefs, including restoration of the powers of the Emperor, he committed seppuku, public ritual suicide, slicing his stomach with a samurai sword. One of his disciples then completed the ritual by beheading Mishima with another sword.
- A bank in Buffalo, New York became one of the first in the United States to allow customers to take advantage of a network of 24-hour automated teller machines (ATMs). Marine Midland Bank— Western installed the ATMs on the outside wall of two branches. The cards, which were a loan on a bank credit card rather than a withdrawal from the customer's account, allowed bank account holders to get either $25 or $50 (equivalent to $160 or $320 nearly 50 years later).

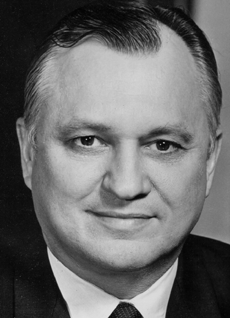
Walter J. Hickel

- Walter J. Hickel, the U.S. Secretary of the Interior, was dismissed from his job by President Nixon in what was described by the Associated Press as "the first outright firing of a Cabinet member in years." He was summoned into President Nixon's office shortly after 5:00 in the afternoon and told that there was a "lack of 'mutual confidence'" between them, and was asked to leave immediately. Hickel had formerly been Governor of Alaska before being asked to become part of the Nixon cabinet.
- Born: Eluana Englaro, Italian hospital patient who became the focus of the euthanasia movement in Italy after being in a coma for 17 years; in Lecco (d. 2009)
- Died: Louise Glaum, 82, American silent film actress known for her portrayal of the vamp character

== November 26, 1970 (Thursday) ==
- The political leader of East Pakistan's Awami League, Sheikh Mujibur Rahman, threatened to lead a secession of the Bengalis' territory from the Punjabis' West Pakistan if Pakistan's President Yahya Khan postponed the scheduled December 7 national parliamentary elections. The voting had been set for October 5, then rescheduled because of the monsoon season. Referring to the West Pakistan controlled national government, Mujibur told a news conference that "our own rulers" were guilty of criminal negligence in the relief effort following the Bhola cyclone and said that "a massive rescue and relief operation, launched within 24 hours of the occurrence, could have saved thousands of lives." He added that Yahya Khan's response to the disaster "has only brought in to sharp focus the basic truth that every Bengali has felt in his bones, that we have been treated too long as a colony and a market."
- A party of hunters in Dixie County, Florida, discovered the wreckage of a small airplane and the remains of four members of the Redd family of Plymouth, Michigan, more than two years after the Redds had vanished while flying from Valdosta, Georgia, to New Port Richey, Florida. Robert Redd had been flying himself and his brother Edward, along with Edward's wife and son, through bad weather for a Labor Day weekend visit to his mother on August 30, 1968. The plane had gone down near Cross City but a two-week search in 1968 had found no trace of it.
- Born: Dave Hughes, Australian comedian and TV show host; in Warrnambool, Victoria

== November 27, 1970 (Friday) ==
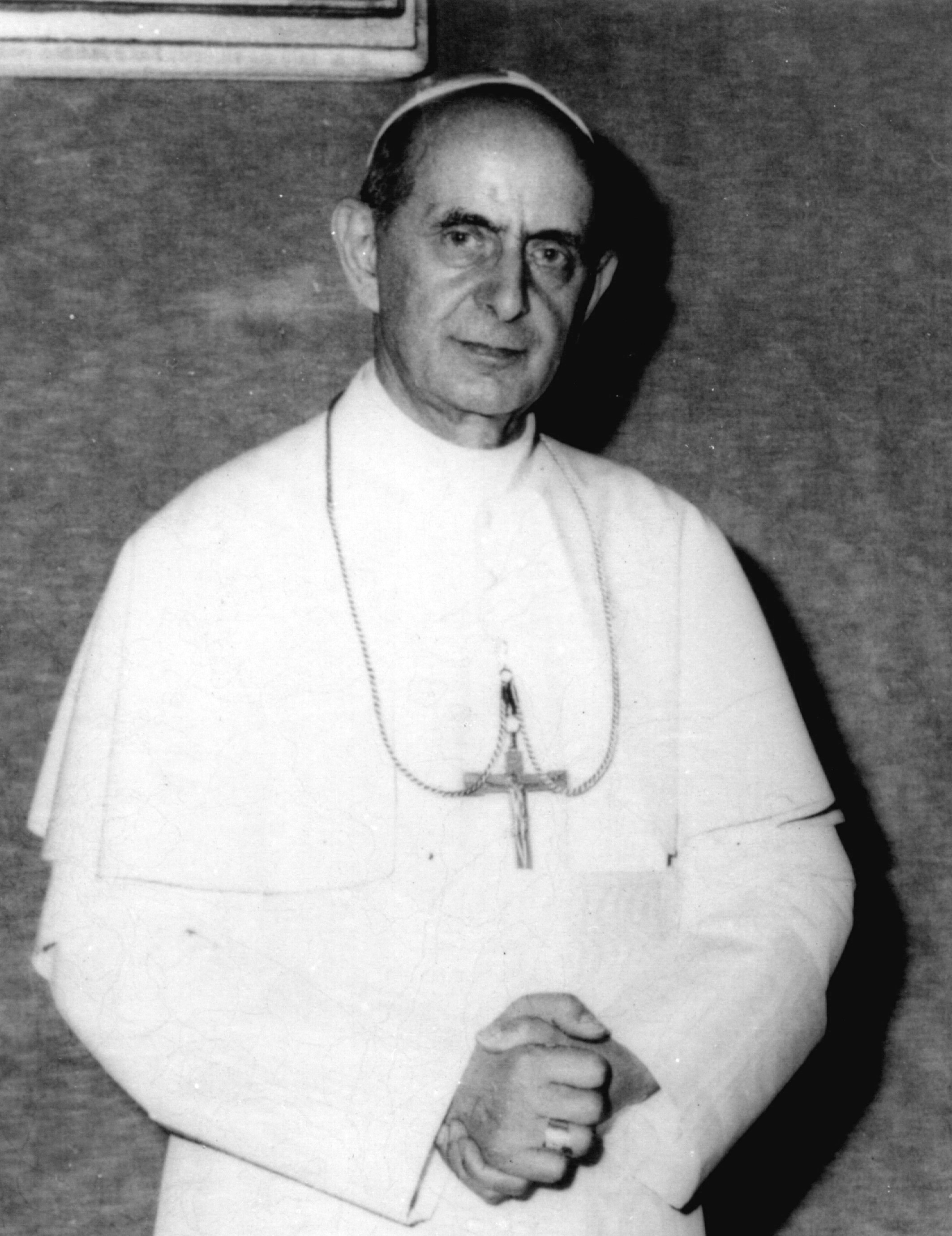
Pope Paul VI

- Bolivian artist Benjamin Mendoza tried to assassinate Pope Paul VI during his visit in Manila. South Korean Archbishop Stephen Kim Sou-hwan was cut on the hand while intervening to protect the Pontiff from Mendoza, who rushed through a crowd of well-wishers after the papal entourage had descended from their airplane at the Manila Airport. Later in the visit, Pope Paul calmly delivered a speech and closed with the greeting "Mahuhay Filipinas!", meaning "Long live the Philippines" in the Tagalog language. The Vatican's physician revealed a month later that the Pope had been stabbed twice in the neck by Mendoza, with the blade hitting on each side of the critical jugular vein, but told the newspaper Resto del Carlino that the blade had been partially blocked by "the heavy, starched breast cape" that the Pope had been wearing.
- All 79 military personnel aboard a Fairchild C-123K Provider transport were killed when the airplane struck a 5,100 ft (1,600 m) high mountain as it was approaching Nha Trang Air Base from Saigon. All but six of the people on board were South Vietnamese servicemen.
- The crash of Capitol Airways Flight 3/26 killed 47 of the 229 people on board. The chartered DC-8 wa a U.S. military airlift to South Vietnam, and went down during its takeoff from Anchorage, Alaska toward Yokota Air Force Base in Japan. The plane failed to accelerate to the necessary liftoff speed and overran the runway, landing in a 12 feet (3.7 m) deep drainage ditch. All but one of the people killed were passengers.
- The highest price bid for a painting up to that time, £2,310,000 ($5,524,000) was paid in London for Portrait of Juan de Pareja, a 17th-century painting by Spanish artist Diego Velázquez. Painted in the year 1649, the work was a half-portrait of Velazquez's assistant, Juan de Pareja.
- Born: Erik Lobo, American comedian and syndicated TV show host; in Sacramento

== November 28, 1970 (Saturday) ==
- The Montreal Alouettes defeated the Calgary Stampeders to win the 58th Grey Cup, 23–10.
- The professional career of Charles "Chic" Brodie, goalkeeper for Brentford F.C. was ended by "the most undignified injury" sustained during a fourth-division game against Colchester United F.C. Brodie was collecting a back-pass from a teammate when a large dog ran on to the field (at Layer Road Stadium in Colchester, Essex) and knocked him down, shattering his kneecap. Brentford lost the game, 4 to 0.
- Born: Richard Osman, English comedian and TV host; in Billericay, Essex

== November 29, 1970 (Sunday) ==
- The crash of a U.S. Air Force transport killed 42 people in South Vietnam, after the Fairchild C-123K Provider struck a 2,700 ft (820 m) ridge in a jungle during its flight from Phan Rang to the Cam Ranh airport. The five-member crew and 27 of the passengers were American servicemen, and the other 12 passengers were South Vietnamese; the incident was the third in two days (and the second involving the C-123K transport) involving a U.S. military airplane. Only two people on board survived the accident.

== November 30, 1970 (Monday) ==
- OAO-B, carrying "the largest space telescope ever launched", a 38 in (97 cm) ultraviolet telescope, should have provided spectra of fainter objects than had previously been observable. The satellite lifted off at 5:40 p.m. but never made it into orbit and burned up on re-entry into the atmosphere. The payload fairing did not separate properly during ascent and the excess weight of it prevented the Centaur stage from achieving orbital velocity. The Centaur and OAO reentered the atmosphere and broke up, destroying a $98,500,000 project. The disaster was later traced to a flaw in a $100 explosive bolt that failed to fire.
- British Caledonian Airways was formed when the Scottish charter carrier Caledonian Airways bought the financially troubled British United Airways (BUA), the largest privately owned airline in the United Kingdom. "B-Cal" would run into its own financial problems in 1987 and would be acquired by British Airways.
- The United States Census Bureau announced its final count for the 1970 decennial census, reporting that on April 1, 1970, the total population of the United States was 204,765,770. The Bureau announced also that California (which had displaced New York as the most populated of the 50 states), Florida, Arizona, Colorado and Texas would gain additional U.S. representatives in 1973 reapportionment and that nine states would lose at least one representative; Pennsylvania and New York were set to lose two.
- Ronald Hughes, one of the attorneys for Charles Manson, failed to appear when the trial resumed after a 10-day recess, during which he had gone on a camping trip in Ventura County. His body would be found on March 29, 1971, wedged between rocks in the waters of Sespe Creek.
- Born:
  - Natalie Williams, American WNBA professional basketball forward, member of U.S. national team in 1998, 2000 and 2002, inductee into Women's Basketball Hall of Fame; in Long Beach, California
  - Walter Emanuel Jones, American actor known for voicing "the Black Power Ranger" and playing Zack Taylor on the TV show Mighty Morphin Power Rangers; in Detroit
