= Hifz-ur-Rehman =

Pakistani archaeologist

Hifz-ur-Rehman (died 1970) was a Pakistani archaeologist, historian and linguist.

== Career ==
Hifz-ur-Rehman donated his life-long collection of nearly 1,500 antiquities to the Lahore Museum, including three Quranic manuscripts of historical significance written by Imam Hussain (grandson of the Islamic prophet Muhammad), many decrees, Chinese porcelain, rare coins, glass objects, miniatures, ivory objects and specimens of calligraphy and Islamic art objects.

== Awards and recognition ==
Hifz-ur-Rehman died on December 31, 1970. Forty years later, on 23 March 2011, President Asif Ali Zardari posthumously honoured him with the "Sitara-i-Imtiaz" (The Star of Excellence) Award for his services in the fields of archaeology, history and linguistic research.
