= Vardadzor =

Village in Gegharkunik, Armenia

Vardadzor Վարդաձոր
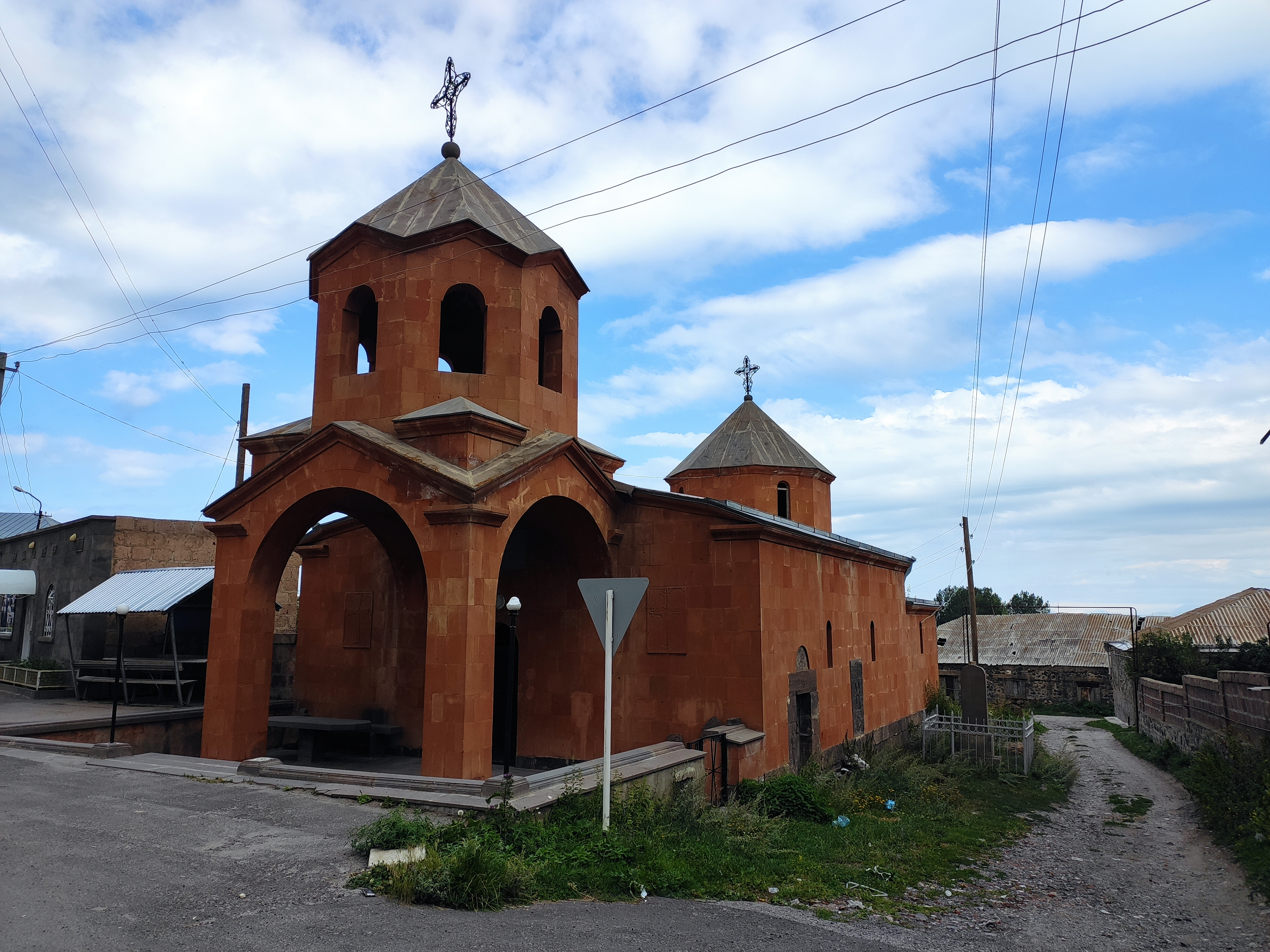
- St. Astvatsatsin Church in Vardadzor

- Location within Armenia Location within Gegharkunik
- Coordinates: 40°11′19″N 45°11′37″E
- Country: Armenia
- Province: Gegharkunik
- Municipality: Martuni
- Founded: 1828-29
- Elevation: 1,986 m (6,516 ft)

Population (2011)
  - Total: 2,864
- Time zone: UTC+4 (AMT)
- Postal code: 1417

Vardadzor (Armenian: Վարդաձոր) is a village in the Martuni Municipality of the Gegharkunik Province of Armenia. Lake Sevan lies a few kilometres to the northeast of the village.

== Etymology ==
The village was previously known as Adamkhan and Atamkhan.

== History ==
The village was founded in 1828-29 by emigrants from Mush. An Urartian inscription dating to 722-705 BC was found at Vardadzor.

== Gallery ==
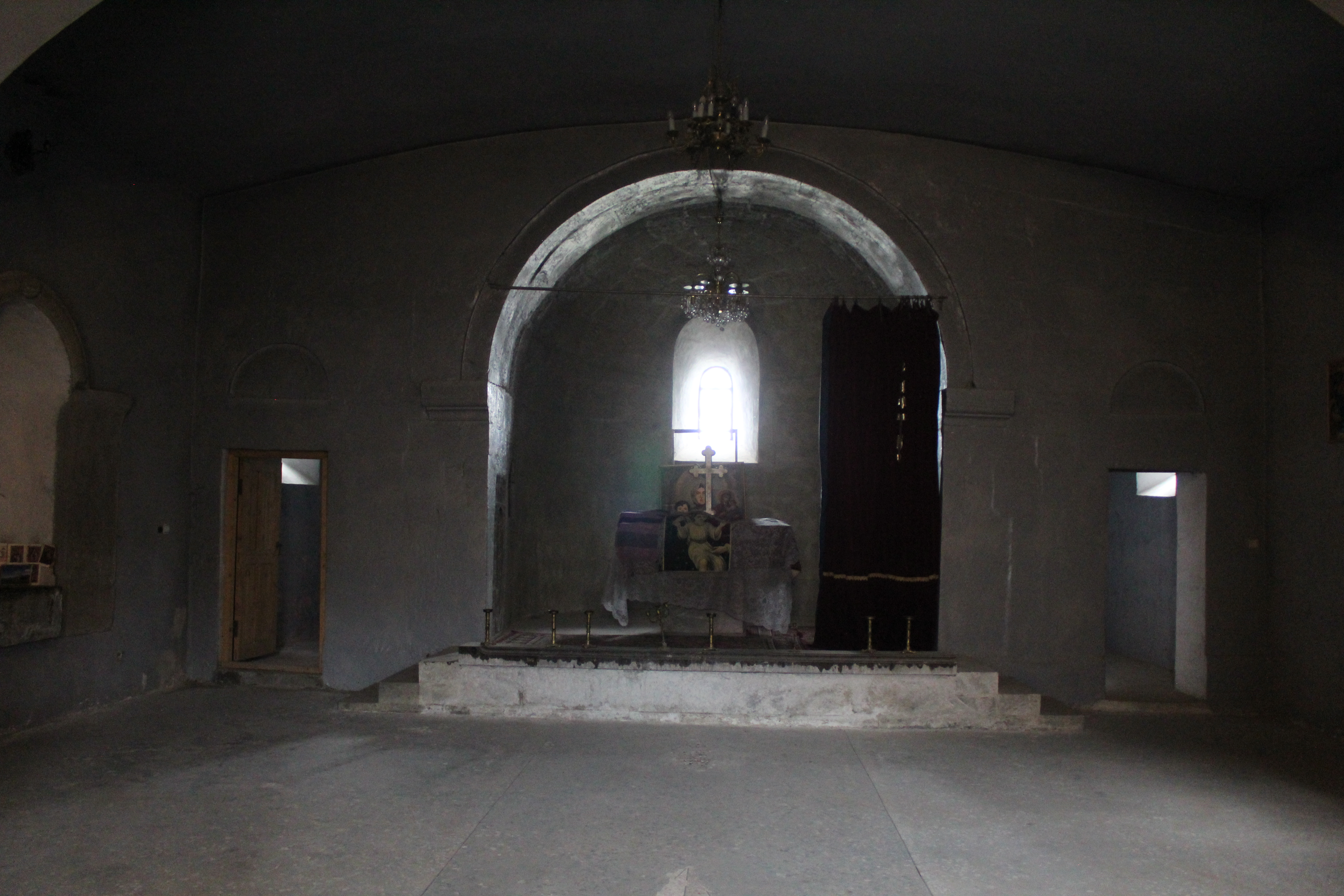
St. Astvatsatsin Church interior
