= Pashto cinema =

Pashto-language film industry of Pakistan

Paswood Peshawar film industry Pashto cinema
- No. of screens: 24 (2023)
- Main distributors: Various local distributors

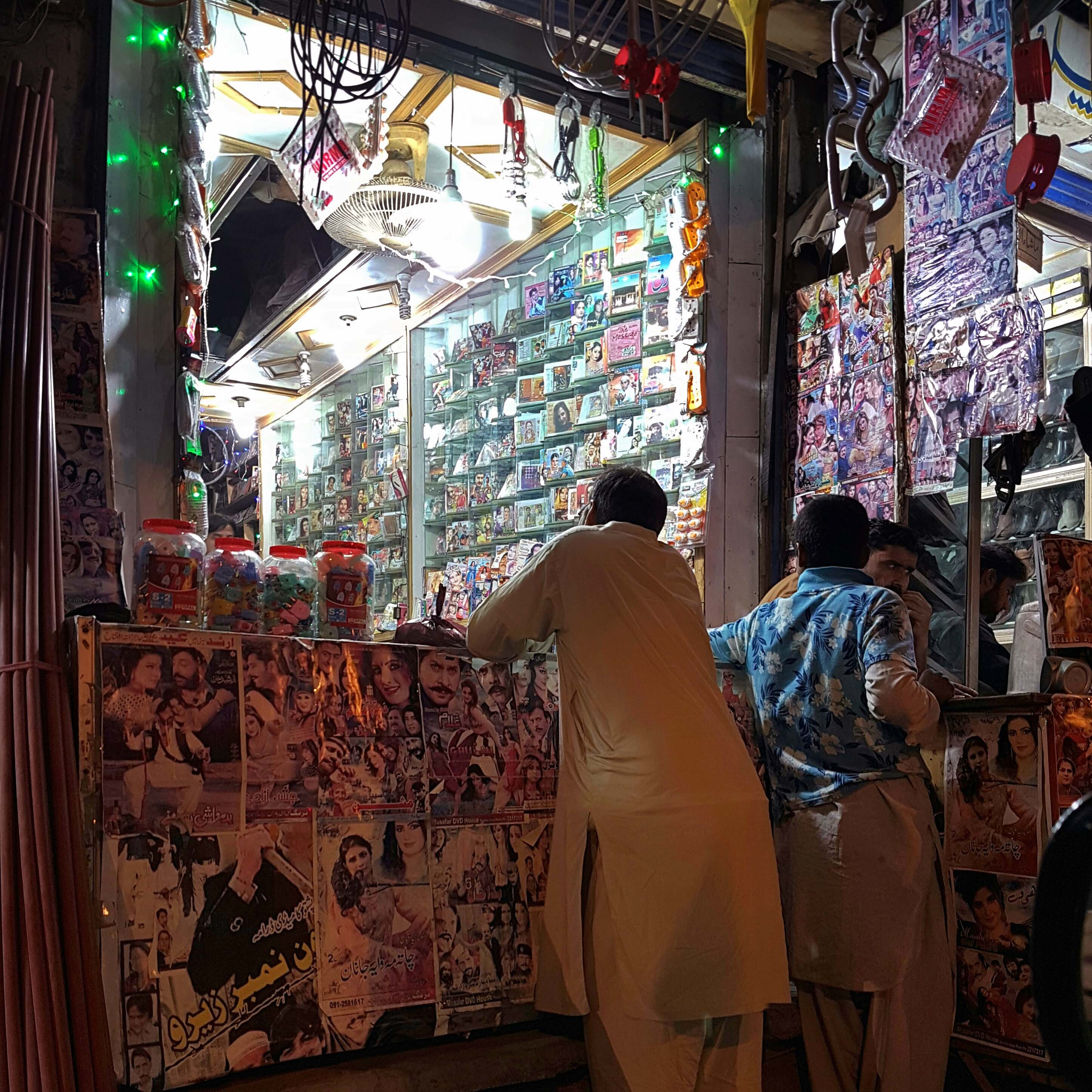
Shop selling Pashto language films

Pashto cinema (Pashto: د پښتو سينما; Pashto: پالېوډ) refers to the Pashto-language film industry of Pakistani cinema based in Peshawar, Khyber Pakhtunkhwa, Pakistan.

== History ==
Yousuf Khan Sher Bano was the first-ever Pashto film produced in Pakistan and released in theaters on 1 December 1970. It was directed by Aziz Tabassum, with debut stars Yasmin Khan and Badar Munir. The story is based on the Pashto folk story Yousuf Khan and Sher Bano and completed 50 weeks at number 1 in Peshawar.

In the same year Kala Kazan Kala Bahar was also released directed by Jamil ahamd and debut star Aman (Lal Muhammad) has shown his great acting and had shaken the cinemas throughout Pakistan.

During the 1990s, Pashto cinema turned to horror and sensation-based plots, unfit with Pashtun culture, drawing families away from the theaters.

In 2015, Sanober Qaiser's film Sartez Badmash was released at two cinemas in Kabul and Pakhtun Pay Dubai was released in Dubai as well as Kabul. In 2013, the first high definition Pashto film Zama Arman was released.

The 2014 Peshawar cinema bombings and the covid lockdown led to a sharp drop of trafic in regional movie theaters.

In 2015 the Pashto film industry released seven new movies in one year. All films were screened at the cinemas in Peshawar, Mingora, Mardan, Kohat and even in a few theatres of Karachi city. The movies released were Ma Cheera Gharib Sara, Sar-Teza Badmash, Daagh, Mayeen kho Lewani vee, Khanadani Badmash, Pukhtoon pa Dubai ke and I Love You too.

== Movie theaters ==
The Firdus Cinema in Peshawar was a hot spot of Pashtun cinema, but it was eventually transformed into a shopping mall. Out of the 15 major cinema venues in the city, no more than 5 still exist.

Shama cinema in Peshawar is popular.

Naz cinema was first to provide 3D digital movie experience at Peshawar.
