= Mozart Gurgel Valente Júnior =

Mozart Gurgel Valente Júnior (11 November 1917, in Rio de Janeiro – 19 December 1970, in Washington, DC) was a Brazilian diplomat, Ambassador to the United States from February to December 1970.

== Life ==
Mozart Gurgel Valente Junior was the son of Maria José Ferreira de Souza and Mozart Gurgel Valente. His mother's brother was Glauco Ferreira de Souza, ambassador in La Paz from 25 October 1958 until his death there on 21 March 1959. Valente had two brothers, Murillo Gurgel Valente and Maury Gurgel Valente.

Beginning in 1942 he was vice-consul to Morris Llewellyn Cooke on an American technical mission to Brazil. Two years later, he expatriated to Algiers. On 19 January 1970, he was appointed ambassador in Washington, D.C., where he was accredited on 20 February 1970. He died on 19 December 1970.
