= Adam Khan and Durkhani =

Classic Pashtun romance

Adam Khan and Durkhani, or Ādamkhān and Durkhānay is a classic Pashtun amorous folktale which has been called the Pashto Romeo and Juliet along with Yusuf Khan and Sherbano. It is considered a classic in the Pashto literature.

Adam Khan hailed from Bazadara Bala (a village in Malakand, Khyber Pakhtunkhwa) and Durkhanai was from Bazadara Payan.

The legend has also been retold in English prose fiction. Changez Jan's novella The Legend of Adam Khan and Durkhanai (2025) draws on multiple oral and written versions of the story into a unified narrative.
