= De Adam Khan =

Community in Helmand Province, Afghanistan

Coordinates: 31.83052°N 64.58823°E

- Village
- Location within Afghanistan
- Country: Afghanistan
- Province: Helmand
- District: Gerishk District

Adamkhan is a community in Helmand Province, Afghanistan. It is about two kilometers east of Ghereshk, the capital of Ghereshk District.

In June 2007 it was reported that De Adam Khan was hit by NATO air strikes intended to hit Taliban fighters. Local inhabitants said that the air strikes killed civilians, including nine women and three children.

== See also ==
- Helmand Province
