= Yousuf Khan Sher Bano =

- یوسف خان شیر بانو
- Directed by: Aziz Tabassum
- Written by: Ali Haider Joshi
- Based on: Yusuf Khan and Sherbano
- Produced by: Nazir Hussain
- Starring: Yasmin Khan; Badar Munir; Nemat Sarhadi
- Music by: Lal Mohammad Iqbal
- Distributed by: United Arts
- Release date: 1 December 1970
- Running time: 129 min
- Country: Pakistan
- Language: Pashto

Yousuf Khan Sher Bano was the first-ever Pashto film released in Pakistan. It was released on 1 December 1970. It was directed by Aziz Tabassum and produced by Nazir Hussain, with debut stars Yasmin Khan and Badar Munir.

The story is based on the Pashto folk story Yousuf Khan and Sherbano. The tale has also been referred to as the Pashto version of Romeo and Juliet.

Its music was composed by Lal Muhammad and Buland Iqbal, while the film was written by Ali Haider Joshi.

This first Pakistani Pashto language film completed more than 50 weeks in one cinema of Peshawar, Pakistan, and was met with a positive reception from the Pakhtun audience. This film also marked the start of Pashto language films in the Pakistan film industry.
