= Badar Munir =

Pakistani film actor (1940 – 2008)

- Born: 1940; Madyan, Swat State, British India (now in Swat, Khyber Pakhtunkhwa, Pakistan)
- Died: 11 October 2008 (aged 67–68); Lahore, Pakistan
- Occupation: Actor
- Children: Dilber Munir; Saeed Munir; Aqal Munir; Imran Munir

Badar Munir (1940 – 11 October 2008) was a Pakistani film actor. Originally from Madyan in the state of Swat, he starred in over 732 Pashto, Urdu and Punjabi language films from 1969 to 2008.

== Early life and career ==
Badar Munir was raised in Swat in a family with a religious background. After completing his elementary school education there, he came to Karachi.

Before joining films, Badar Munir used to drive a rikshaw on Karachi streets. Then he got a job as a lighting technician on actor Waheed Murad's recommendation in a Karachi film studio. He was introduced by Waheed Murad to the film industry in 1970. His first movie was Yousuf Khan Sher Bano (1970), with Yasmin Khan as the heroine. This was the first Pashto language film of the Pakistan film industry in 1970. In 2016, the city of Karachi had the largest urban population of Pashto-speaking people in the world, larger than even in Peshawar, Kabul, Quetta and Kandahar.

== Filmography ==
Year	Film	Language
1968	Jahan Tum Wahan Hum	Urdu
1969	Nai Laila Naya Majnu	Urdu
1970	Yousuf Khan Sher Bano	Pashto
1971	Adam Khan Dukhaniye	Pashto
1972	Jahan Baraf Girti Hai	Urdu
1973	Orbal	Pashto
1974	Dedan	Pashto
1974	Khana Badosh	Pashto
1975	Roshni	Urdu
1975	Dulhan Aik Raat Ki	Urdu
1976	Nawye de ywe shpe	Pashto
1977	Aj Diyan Kurrian	Punjabi
1978	Jan Ki Baazi	Urdu
1978	Shola	Punjabi
1979	General Bakht Khan	Urdu
1979	Aurat Raj	Urdu
1981	Daagh	Pashto
1982	Da gaz da maydan	Pashto
1983	Nimgarai aarrman	Pashto
1984	Shponkai	Pashto
1984	Khan Dekan	Panjabi
1984	Topak zama kanon	Pashto
1984	Haibat khan	Punjabi
1985	Yarana	Pashto
1985	Aulad	Pashto
1986	Shak	Urdu
1988	Daka	Pashto
1990	Haseena Atom Bomb	Urdu
1991	Dushman Kaka	Pashto
1992	Zama zid	Pashto
1991	Adam Khor	Pashto
1994	Saranga	Pashto
1995	Goorkun	Pashto
1997	Deewane Tere Pyar Ke	Urdu
2000	Tere Pyar Mein	Urdu
2001	Musalman	Urdu
2001	Pathan	Urdu
2003	Body Guard	Pashto
2003	Amanat	Pashto
2006	Musafar	Pashto

== Death and legacy ==
Badar Munir had been suffering from kidney-related ailments and diabetes for some five years prior to his death. He had a paralysis attack a few years ago. Two days before his death, he had a heart attack and was hospitalized where he died on 11 October 2008.

== See also ==
- List of Lollywood actors
