= Khaak Aur Khoon =

Khaak Aur Khoon may refer to:

- Khaak Aur Khoon (novel), a 1950 Urdu novel by Nasīm Ḥijāzī
- Khaak Aur Khoon (film), a 1979 Pakistani Urdu film, based on the novel
