= Zafar Masood =

Zafar Masood, also spelled as Zafar Masud may refer to:

- Zafar Masood (actor), Pakistani actor
- Zafar Masud (air commodore), Pakistan Air Force officer
- Zafar Masud (banker), Pakistani banker
