= Munawar Saeed =

Pakistani TV and film actor

- منوّر سعِید
- Born: Syed Munawar Saeed Naqvi; 1 July 1941 (age 85); Amroha, United Provinces, British India
- Education: Aligarh Muslim University
- Occupation: Actor
- Years active: 1966 – present
- Children: 4, including Zafar Masud
- Awards: Pride of Performance Award by the president of Pakistan (2003); Nigar Award (1973)

Munawar Saeed (Urdu: منوّر سعِید; born 1 July 1941) is a Pakistani TV and film actor. He has performed in around 200 Urdu and Punjabi films and more than 1,000 television dramas. He is known for his villain roles in TV serials like Waris (1979 - 1980) and Moorat (2004) and films like Anmol (1973), Sharafat (1974), Pehchan (1975), and Aj Diyan Kurrian (1977). He was honored with the Pride of Performance Award in 2003.

== Early life and education ==
Saeed was born on 1 July 1941, in Amroha, Uttar Pradesh, British India. His father was a lawyer who fought cases at the Allahabad High Court, where his maternal grandfather had served as judge. He migrated to Pakistan in 1960 after doing his B.Sc. from the Aligarh Muslim University. He is a relative of the poets Rais Amrohvi and Jaun Elia.

== Career ==
After settling in Karachi, Pakistan, he started working on stage and at Radio Pakistan. In 1967, when a television station was established in Karachi, he started working in TV dramas. In 1969, he was offered an Urdu film Ghar Damaad from Lollywood. He accepted the project and left Karachi for Lahore. While staying in Lahore, he used all four mediums of art; film, TV, radio, and stage, to express his artistic abilities. Mostly, he acted out negative characters in TV plays and films. The films like Anmol (1973) and Pehchan (1975) helped him in build his reputation for sophisticated villain roles.

He lived in Lahore for nearly fifty years. Then, he returned to Karachi and started working in private TV productions.

== Personal life ==
Saeed's son, Zafar Masud, is a senior banker and was one of the two survivors of the PIA Flight 8303 crash.

== Selected filmography ==
=== Television series ===
| Year | Title | Role | Network | Notes |
|---|---|---|---|---|
| 1973 | Mirza Ghalib Bandar Road Par | Teepu | PTV | Long-play |
| 1975 | Mehman | | PTV | |
| 1979–1980 | Waris | Chaudhry Yaqub | PTV | |
| 1981 | Siyah Kiran | Safdar | PTV | Long-play |
| 1982 | Alif Noon | | PTV | Kindergarten Main |
| 1984 | Mirza And Sons | Mirza Etemad Ahmed | PTV | Long-play Drama 84 |
| 1984 | Lazwal | | PTV | |
| 1984–1985 | Andhera Ujala | Different roles. | PTV | |
| 1985 | Tota Kahani | Manzoor | PTV | Long-play: 9th story |
| 1986 | Hazaron Raaste | Qadir Hussain | PTV | |
| 1986 | In Se Miliay | Ibn-e-Wafa | PTV | Long-play Drama 86 |
| 1991 | Pat Jhar | Foji | PTV | |
| 1991 | Ghar Se Nilkay | | PTV | |
| 1993 | Fareb | Bashir-ud-din | PTV | |
| 1994 | Alao | Chaudhry Anwar | PTV | |
| 1995 | Dukh Sukh | Kuda Dad | PTV | |
| 1996 | Lab-e-Sahil | Chief Secretary | PTV | |
| 1998 | Jeet | Police officer | PTV | |
| 1998 | Larki Ek Sharmili Si | Sharafat | PTV | Comedy Theater |
| 1998 | Musafatain | | PTV | |
| 2000 | Zamana | Chaudhry | PTV | |
| 2001 | Barhtay Saay | | PTV | |
| 2003 | Dil Ye Kehta Hay | Baba | PTV | |
| 2004 | Aag | Bhola's father | PTV | |
| 2004 | Be Zaban | Syed Munawar Hussain | PTV | |
| 2004–2005 | Moorat | Karim | ARY Digital | |
| 2010 | Bebaak | | Hum TV | |
| 2011 | Keya Chaha Keya Paya | Agha Jani | PTV Home | |
| 2011–2012 | Sure | | PTV Home | |
| 2012 | Sasural Ke Rang Anokhay | | Hum TV | |
| 2012 | Roshan Sitara | | Hum TV | |
| 2012 | Shehr-e-Zaat | Baba | Hum TV | |
| 2013 | Mein Hari Piya | | Hum TV | |
| 2013 | Rehaai | Inayat | Hum TV | |
| 2013 | Mere Hamrahi | | ARY Digital | |
| 2013–2014 | Bunty I Love You | | Hum TV | |
| 2015 | Mol | Imtiaz | Hum TV | |
| 2016 | Lagaao | Safdar Rana | Hum TV | |
| 2016–2017 | Sanam | Sharafat Qureshi | Hum TV | |
| 2016–2017 | Parsai | Ehtesham | A-Plus TV | |
| 2017 | Beti To Main Bhi Hun | | Urdu 1 | |
| 2017 | Khud Badolat | Bakhyar | TV One | |
| 2023–2024 | Baby Baji | Siddiqui | ARY Digital | |
| 2024-2025 | Ghair | Ehsan Elahi | ARY Digital | |

=== Film ===
- Ghar Damaad (1969)
- Anmol (1973)
- Sharafat (1974)
- Mitti Ke Putlay (1974)
- Pehchan (1975)
- Aj Diyan Kurrian (1977)
- Muqaddar Ka Sikandar (1984)
- Hero (1985)
- Insaniyat Kay Dushman (1990)

== Awards and recognition ==
| Year | Award | Category | Result | Work | Ref. |
|---|---|---|---|---|---|
| 1973 | Nigar Award | Best Supporting Actor | Won | Anmol | |
| 2003 | Pride of Performance Award | Arts | Won | Acting | |
| 2013 | Pakistan Media Award | Best Supporting Actor | Nominated | Tamanna | |
