= Musa ibn Abi al-Ghassan =

The knight of Granada فارس غرناطة Musa ibn Abi al-Ghassan
- موسى بن أبي الغسان
- Born: Unknown
- Died: Late 1491
- Military career
- Allegiance: Al Andalus (Nasrid Kingdom)
- Known for: Opposition to the surrender of Granada
- Conflicts: Granada War

Musa ibn Abi al-Ghassan (Arabic: موسى بن أبي الغسان, romanized: Mūsa ibn Abi al-g͟hassan) was a Muslim commander who lived during the final years of the Reconquista. He is known for his opposition to the surrender of the Muslims in Granada, which ended around 800 years of Muslim rule in Iberia.

Although Musa is only mentioned in Spanish sources, which state that he killed himself to avoid capture by the Christians, many modern Muslim historians, such as Ragheb Sergani, confirm his historicity.

== Origins and early life ==
Musa was born in Granada to an Arab family related to the ruling Nasrid dynasty. His family's roots trace back to the Ghassanids, an ancient Yemeni Arab tribe that ruled the Levant before Islam. Musa’s upbringing in this family had its impact on his personality. He grew up to be a daring knight, a valiant hero, and a good swordsman.

== Granada War ==
=== Siege ===
In April 1491, Ferdinand V demanded that Muhammad XII, Granada's ruler, give up the Alhambra palace and the city of Granada. Inside the city, Musa led a movement that calls for continuing the jihad against the Christians and the rejection of surrender, saying that "a grave under the ruins of Granada, in the place I die defending, is better for me than the most lavish palaces we obtain by submission to the enemies of Islam." Granada was besieged by the Christian forces of Castile and Aragon. The siege would last for eight months.

=== Defense of Granada ===
Muhammad XII gave Musa control of the cavalry. Musa ordered "the opening of the doors, and prepared his soldiers in front of them in night and day. If a group of Christian soldiers came close, the Muslim cavalry attacked." He told his soldiers that "We have nothing but the land we stand on; if we lost it, we lose our identity and homeland."

Ferdinand V decided to march on the walls of Granada, and heavy fighting emerged between his forces and those of the Muslims, led by Muhammad XII and Musa. The Muslims were forced back into the city, with Musa returning while "shivering in anger and despair."

== Fall of Granada and death ==
=== Christian terms ===
The situation was becoming increasingly dire for the defenders. After seven months, Muhammad XII, the ruler of Granada, accepted surrender and asked the Christians for terms. He was offered rather generous terms, which included freedom of religion and protection of Islamic masjids.

=== Refusal to surrender ===
Muhammad XII discussed the terms with Granada's fuqaha and prominent public figures in the Alhambra Palace. Musa immediately rejected this proposal, and warned Muhammad XII against surrendering, saying that the Christians will not abide by the treaty, and that he refused to see the humiliation that will come after surrendering. This would later come true, and the Spaniards would use the First Rebellion of the Alpujarras as an excuse to void the terms of the treaty.

=== Death ===
Seeing that everyone else in the gathering agreed to surrender, Musa left the meeting and went to his house. He then put on his armor and rode his horse. He then left the city, and met a group of around 15 Christian soldiers. He killed most of them and died himself. Castilian sources claim he threw himself in the river behind him, subsequently drowning due to his heavy armor, to avoid capture. However, in The story of Al Andalus, Ragheb Sergani disputes this, and says that the Christian troops killed him.

== Historicity ==
Musa is only mentioned in Christian Spanish sources. Modern Muslim historians either affirm his historicity or are neutral in this issue. Ragheb Sergani states that "the truth is that we don't expect Spanish sources to invent a Muslim personality that leads a great defense of Granada." On the other hand, Muhammad Inan writes that "we mention the Castilian narrative here not to confirm its historical accuracy, but because it provides a great example for the Muslims' defense of their religion, homeland and their last base."

== Popular culture ==
- Mentioned, in Shaheen (Novel) by Naseem Hijazi, as a veteran commander who opposed the surrender of Granada and martyred while valiantly defending Granada.
