= Shujaat Hashmi =

Pakistani television and film actor (died 2026)

- شجاعت ہاشمی
- Born: October 31, 1947; Rawalpindi, Punjab, Pakistan
- Died: March 13, 2026 (aged 78); Lahore, Punjab, Pakistan
- Occupation: Actor
- Years active: 1975–2026
- Known for: Waris (1979 TV serial)
- Awards: Pride of Performance Award by the President of Pakistan (1994)

Shujaat Hashmi (Punjabi, Urdu: شجاعت ہاشمی; died March 2026) was a Pakistani television and film actor. He was known for his roles in the television drama Waris and the film Khaak Aur Khoon, both appearing in 1979. He was honoured with the Pride of Performance Award in 1994.

== Early life and education ==
Hashmi was born in Rawalpindi, Punjab and did his Masters in History from Gordon College, Rawalpindi. He then joined Radio Pakistan's Rawalpindi Center.

== Career ==
Hashmi started his career in Yawar Hayat's PTV drama Kuhar. His debut film Chhad Buray Di Yaari was released in 1975 and was in Punjabi. He gained popularity by playing the role of Mauladad in Amjad Islam Amjad's hit TV drama Waris (1979–1980). After the success of Waris, he played a lead role in the 1979 Urdu film Khaak Aur Khoon, directed by Masood Parvez. He was also known for his role in the films Wadda Khan and Do Ziddi (both 1983).

== Death ==
On 13 March 2026, it was announced that Hashmi had died after prolonged illness. He was 78 years old.

== Filmography ==
=== Films ===
Year	Title	Language	Notes
1975	Chhad Buray Di Yaari	Punjabi	
1978	Haider Ali	Urdu	
1979	Khaak Aur Khoon	Urdu	Notable patriotic film
1980	Sohra Tay Javai	Punjabi	
1981	Lajawab	Urdu	
1981	Chacha Bhateeja	Punjabi	
1982	Khubsoorat	Urdu	
1982	Noukar Tay Malik	Punjabi	
1982	Dostana	Punjabi	
1982	Wohti Da Sawal A	Punjabi	
1983	Sahib Ji	Punjabi	
1983	Do Ziddi	Punjabi	
1983	Aakhri Muqabila	Punjabi	
1983	Raka	Punjabi	
1983	Shagird Maulay Jatt Da	Punjabi	
1983	Wadda Khan	Punjabi	
1984	Dil Maa Da	Punjabi	
1985	Haq Mehar	Punjabi	
1986	Jitt Qanoon Di	Punjabi	
1986	Hitler	Punjabi	
1986	Babul Dian Galian	Punjabi	Lead role
1986	Shehnai	Punjabi	
1987	Doli Tay Hathkari	Punjabi	
1987	Khanu Sher	Punjabi	
1988	Commando Action	Punjabi	
1990	Garm Lahoo	Punjabi	
1992	Marshal	Punjabi	
1992	Sher Jang	Punjabi	

=== Television series ===
Year	Title	Role	Notes
1975	Ya Naseeb Clinic	Doctor Nasir	
1976	Makoos Rabtay	Asif	Aik Muhabbat Sau Afsanay
1976	Zood-e-Pashaimaan	Laila's Father	Aik Muhabbat Sau Afsanay
1976	Chaangar	Amjad	Aik Muhabbat Sau Afsanay
1979	Zanjeer	Sheefa Naag	Aik Haqeeqat Aik Fasana
1979–1980	Waris	Maula Dad / Fateh Sher	
1983	Picnic	Iftikhar	
1987	Wadi	Kamal Khan	
1992	Jhalla	Jhalla	Anthology: Ajj Di Kahani
1995	Zard Dopehar	Malik Mehrban Ali	Character based on Nawaz Sharif
1997	Shanakht	Jan Muhammad	
1997	Family Front	Khushiya's Mamu	
1997	Kot Kher Deen		
1999	Naqaab	Jamshaid	
—	Kohar		
—	Raat Ka Pichhla Pehar		
—	Rani Aur Razia		
—	Kirchian		
—	Aakhir-e-Shab		
2004	Kantay		

== Awards and nominations ==
Year	Award	Category	Result	Ref.
1994	Pride of Performance Award	Arts	Won	
