= Aj Diyan Kurrian =

1977 Pakistani Punjabi film

- اج دیاں کڑیاں
- Directed by: Kamal
- Screenplay by: Khawar Zaman
- Story by: Kamal
- Produced by: Kamal
- Starring: Kamal; Neelo; Nisho; Najma; Naveen Tajik; Rangeela; Jamshed Ansari; Ishrat Chaudhary; Badar Munir; Asha Posley; Saiqa; Nabeela; Nimmi
- Cinematography: Latif Kalakar
- Music by: Wajahat Attre
- Production company: Kemal Films
- Release date: 22 November 1977
- Country: Pakistan
- Language: Punjabi

Aj Diyan Kurrian is a 1977 Pakistani Punjabi romantic comedy film produced and directed by Kamal.

The lead cast included Kamal, Neelo, Nisho, Najma, Naveen Tajik, Rangeela, Jamshed Ansari, and Badar Munir.

The film was a commercial success and won the Nigar Award for "Best film" of the year. The film is also remembered for its hit song "Kaleyan Na Jana Saaday Naal Naal Chalo Jee", vocalized by Naheed Akhtar, Mehnaz, and Shazia.

== Cast ==
- Kamal
- Neelo
- Nisho
- Najma
- Naveen Tajik
- Rangeela
- Jamshed Ansari
- Badar Munir
- Munawar Saeed
- Ali Ejaz
- Khanum
- Aurangzeb
- Farzana
- Dimple
- Nazim
- Saiqa
- Mansoor
- Nazar
- Faizi
- Nimmi
- Rashid
- Ishrat Chaudhary
- Asha Posley
- Nabeela
- Malik Anokha
- Khalid Nizami
- Munir Zarif
- Dildar Pervaiz Bhatti

== Music and soundtracks ==
The music of Aj Diyan Kurrian was composed by Wajahat Attre and lyrics were penned by Hazeen Qadri:

- Doorun Bari Doorun, Tera Khat Aya, Dholna... Singer(s): Mehnaz, Ahmad Rushdi
- Kalian Na Jana, Saday Naal Naal Chalo Jee... Singer(s): Naheed Akhtar, Mehnaz, and Shazia.
- Thandi Thandi Rutt Tay Kanwaray Marr Jan Gay... Singer(s): A. Nayyar, Masood Rana

== Release and box office ==
Aj Diyan Kurrian was released on 22 November 1977. It was a 'hit film' at the box office.

== Awards ==
Year	Award	Category	Awardee	Ref.
1977	Nigar Award	Best Film	Kemal Films	
1977	Nigar Award	Best Musician	Wajahat Attre	
