= Parakh (1978 film) =

1978 Pakistani Urdu film

- پرکھ
- Directed by: Jan Mohammad Jumman
- Written by: Jalil Afghani
- Screenplay by: Bashir Niaz
- Produced by: S.M.K. Hussain
- Starring: Rani; Waheed Murad; Asif Khan; Usman Pirzada; Naveen Tajik; Nanha; Qavi
- Music by: Kamal Ahmed
- Release date: 7 April 1978
- Country: Pakistan
- Language: Urdu

Parakh is a 1978 Pakistani Urdu film directed by Jan Mohammad Jumman. It starred Waheed Murad, Rani, Qavi, and Asif Khan in the lead cast. The story was written by Jalil Afghani and the screenplay and dialogues were penned by Bashir Niaz. Parakh was a golden jubilee hit at the box office.

== Cast ==
- Rani as Gun Balo
- Waheed Murad
- Asif Khan as Saith Daud
- Usman Pirzada as Aslam
- Naveen Tajik as Farida
- Nanha as Zero
- Qavi as SP Waqar
- Tamanna as Julie
- Saqi
- Romana
- Jalil Afghani
- Rashid
- Dildar Pervaiz Bhatti

== Release and box office ==
Parakh was released on 7 April 1978. The film completed 52 weeks at the main theaters and was crowned as a golden jubilee hit.

== Music and soundtracks ==
The music of Parakh was composed by Kamal Ahmed and Taslim Fazli was the lyricist:

- Kisi Nay Kisi Ko Itna Nahin Chaha Ho Ga ... Singer(s): Mehnaz, Ghulam Abbas
- Ponchh Lay Aansoo In Ankhon Say ... Singer(s): A. Nayyar
- Rani O Rani, Sapno Ki Rani ... Singer(s): A. Nayyar
- Saathi Koi Aisa Milay ... Singer(s): A. Nayyar, Mehnaz

== Awards ==
Parakh won a Nigar Award for the following category:

Year	Category	Awardee	Ref.
1978	Best supporting actor	Qavi	
