= Pervaiz =

Pervaiz is a given name. Notable people with the name include:

- Ansar Pervaiz, Pakistani nuclear scientist, nuclear technologist and the current chairman of the Pakistan Atomic Energy Commission
- Chaudhry Pervaiz Elahi (born 1945), Pakistani politician
- Dildar Pervaiz Bhatti (1946–1994), Pakistani television and radio host and announcer
- Pervaiz Iqbal Cheema (born 1940), scholar of International Relations and Strategic Studies from Pakistan
- Pervaiz Kaleem, Pakistani film director and writer based in Lahore
- Raja Pervaiz Ashraf (born 1950), Prime Minister of Pakistan and Pakistan Peoples Party politician
