= Khaak Aur Khoon (film) =

1979 Pakistani Urdu film

- خاک اور خون
- Directed by: Masood Parvez
- Screenplay by: Naseem Hijazi
- Story by: Naseem Hijazi
- Based on: Khaak Aur Khoon (1950 novel)
- Starring: Naveen Tajik; Shujaat Hashmi; Abid Ali; Mehboob Alam
- Cinematography: Masood-ur-Rehman
- Edited by: Ali
- Music by: Nisar Bazmi
- Production company: National Film Development Corporation (NFDC)
- Release date: 23 March 1979
- Country: Pakistan
- Language: Urdu

Khaak Aur Khoon is a 1979 Pakistani Urdu film directed by Masood Parvez and based on Naseem Hijazi's novel of the same name. The lead cast included Naveen Tajik, Shujaat Hashmi, Abid Ali, and Mehboob Alam. Despite having an average box office performance, Khaak Aur Khoon received 8 Nigar Awards for various aspects of filmmaking.

== Plot ==
The story is set in the background of Indo-Pakistan Partition in 1947. The film depicts the hurdles and mass massacre that Muslims from East Punjab faced in their attempt to migrate to the newly formed country Pakistan. The main character is Saleem, the son of a tahsildar and a member of a big joint family living in a village of Eastern Punjab. After spending a childhood full of smiles and laughter, Saleem joins the All India Muslim League as a college student and becomes an activist for the cause of an independent state.

The later part of the film is all about the brutality committed against the Muslim migrants. Saleem's entire family is martyred despite fighting valiantly during the days of migration when Sikh mobs and the Muslims of Saleem's village engage in a violent battle. Saleem survives and continues to serve the cause and assist the migrants during their arduous journey to Pakistan.

After reaching Pakistan, Saleem marries Asmat, the girl he has always been in love with since his high school days. In the end, Saleem, though deeply saddened over the sacrifices his family had to offer, feels content with his efforts and contributions to the formation of a separate state of Pakistan.

== Cast ==
- Naveen Tajik
- Shujaat Hashmi
- Abid Ali
- Mehboob Alam
- Agha Faraz
- Inayat Anjum

== Production ==
The film was sponsored by the National Film Development Corporation (NFDC) as a government's cultural project.

== Music and soundtracks ==
The music of the film was composed by Nisar Bazmi and Ahmad Rahi was the lyricist:

- Alam To Hay Parda-e-Taqdeer Mein — Singer: Mehdi Hassan
- Main Teri Yaad Ko Dil Say Bhulata Hun — Singer: Mehdi Hassan

== Release and box office ==
Khaak Aur Khoon was released on 23 March 1979 and performed averagely at the box office.

== Awards ==
Khaak Aur Khoon won 8 Nigar Awards for the following categories:

Category	Awardee
Best film of 1979	Production
Best director	Masood Parvez
Best script writer	Naseem Hijazi
Best screenplay	Naseem Hijazi
Best musician	Nisar Bazmi
Best film editor	Ali
Best cinematographer	Masood-ur-Rehman
Best art director	Haji Mohiuddin
