= Wadda Khan =

Pakistani film

- Directed by: Diljeet Mirza
- Written by: Aqeel Rubi
- Produced by: Mian Mohammad Hafeez; Diljeet Mirza
- Starring: Yousuf Khan; Sultan Rahi; Mustafa Qureshi; Rani; Muhammad Ali; Khanum; Talish; Allauddin; Tani Begum; Nayyar Sultana; Shujaat Hashmi
- Cinematography: Ashiq Mirza
- Edited by: Sheikh Mohammad Asghar
- Music by: Safdar Hussain; Qamar Abbas; Lyrics by:Waris Ludhianvi
- Production companies: Diljeet Productions; Shah Noor Studios
- Release date: 18 November 1983
- Running time: 155 minutes
- Country: Pakistan
- Language: Punjabi

Wadda Khan (Punjabi: وڈا خان) is a 1983 Pakistani Punjabi-language action movie, directed by Diljeet Mirza and produced by Mian Mohammad Hafeez. It stars in the lead roles Yousuf Khan and Rani, with Mustafa Qureshi playing the villain.

== Cast ==
- Yousuf Khan
- Sultan Rahi
- Asif Khan
- Mustafa Qureshi
- Rani
- Muhammad Ali - وڈا خان
- Khanum
- Allauddin
- Saqi
- Sawan
- Nayyar Sultana
- Salma Mumtaz
- Tani Begum
- Shujaat Hashmi
- Talish
- Mizla
- Nossi
- Jaggi Malik
- Changezi

== Soundtrack ==
The music of Wadda Khan is composed by Safdar Hussain with lyrics penned by Waris Ludhyanvi. The album earned

Wadda Khan

Soundtrack album by Safdar Hussain
- Recorded: 1983
- Genre: Film soundtrack
- Length: 16:58
- Language: Punjabi
- Label: Best Musical
- Director: Diljeet Mirza
- Producer: Mohammad Hafeez
- Compiler: Akhtar Jilani

=== Track listing ===
No.	Title	Artist(s)	Length
1.	"Main Na Haara Gai"	Noor Jahan	3:37
2.	"Bohti Sohni Kurri Vee Ajeeb Hondi"	Masood Rana & Afshan	3:45
3.	"O Peera Di Panjeeb Kul Gi"	Noor Jahan	3:08
4.	"Khana O Khana Vey Beimana"	Noor Jahan	4:02
5.	"Jind Muk Jaway Qol Nahi"	Noor Jahan	3:12
