= Shaheen (novel) =

Historical novel by Naseem Hijazi

- Author: Naseem Hijazi
- Language: Urdu
- Genre: Novel
- Publication date: 1948
- Publication place: Pakistan

Shaheen (Urdu: شاہین) is a 1948 historical novel written in Urdu by Pakistani Islamic historian and novelist Naseem Hijazi.

Set against the backdrop of 1492, the novel captures the twilight of Muslim rule in Granada as the community faced the imminent threat of expulsion from Spain. Through a vivid portrayal of political decay and internal strife, Hijazi explores the complex factors that led to the ultimate collapse of Muslim power in the region.

== Chapters ==
- Baghi (the rebel)
- Sarhadi Uqaab (the frontier eagle)
- Millat Firoush (nation seller; a traitor)
- In Ka Maizbaan (their host)
- Rabia ka Izteraab (disquiet of Rabia)
- Rabia kay Khuwab ki Tabeer (enunciation of Rabia's dream)
- Qoum aur us ka Sipahi (Nation and her soldier)
- Naye 'Azm (renewed resolves)
- Baap aur Beta (father and son)
- Taar-e-'Ankaboot (the spider's web)
- Mujahid aur Ghadaar (the mujahid and the traitor)
- Siyah Posh (the one donned in black)

== Characters ==
- Moughera: a Muslim military commander who controlled a limited mountainous and forested area (some sixty kilometers long and 40 kilometers wide) somewhere in the Emirate of Granada (exact location is not mentioned)
- Badar bin Moughera: a military commander; the central figure of the book
- Musa ibn Abi al-Ghassan: a Granada military commander
- Muhammad XI: the last Muslim ruler of Granada
- Ferdinand II of Aragon: King of Aragon from 1479 until his death in 1516 and husband of Isabella I
- Isabella I of Castile: Queen of Aragon from 1479 until her death as the wife of King Ferdinand II
- Muhammad XII of Granada: Abu Abdallah Muhammad az-Zaghal
- Rabia: wife of Badar bin Moughera (mentioned in few instances)
- Bashir bin Hassan: a physician / companion of Badar bin Moughera
- Count Santiago: a fictional character maybe based on the Legend of Saint Santiago (Saint James) in medieval Spain?
- Abu'l-Hasan Ali of Granada: father of Muhammad XI
- Mansour bin Ahmad: adjutant or second in command to Badar bin Moughera
- Abu Dawud: the traitor (father of Rabia and Angela, husband of Miriya)
- Miriya: Christian (second) wife of Abu Dawud and mother of Angela / from Murcia
- Naeem bin Rizwan: a commander in Badar's army
- al-Zaighri: a high-ranking commander of Granada army

== Other notable people mentioned ==
- Tariq bin Ziyad
- Musa bin Nusayr
