= Khaak Aur Khoon (novel) =

Urdu historical novel

- Author: Naseem Hijazi
- Language: Urdu
- Genre: Historical novel
- Published: 1950
- Publication place: Pakistan

Khaak Aur Khoon (Urdu: خاک اور خون, lit. 'The Dust and the Blood') is a 1950 Urdu historical novel by Nasīm Ḥijāzī that describes the sacrifices of Muslims of the Indian sub-continent during the time of partition in 1947.

== Historical background ==
When Muslims of different regions were trying to get to Pakistan, many groups of Hindus would attack them during their journeys to snatch their money and the jewellery of the women. The Hindus robbed everybody they found on the way. Khak aur Khoon not only describes how many sacrifices the Muslims made to get their new homeland, but it also describes the true face of fanaticism at the time. On 3 June 1947, Lord Mountbatton announced that the Punjab district of Gurdaspur was going to be aligned with Pakistan. Muslims, after listening to this, guarded the homes and properties of their non-Muslim neighbours from the riots, but later Radcliff gifted this district to India to enable a passage to Kashmir for India. It was done at the wishes of leaders of Congress and the Hindu raja of Kashmir, Hari Singh, who all wanted Kashmir to be mixed with India even against the wishes of local population.

== Plot ==
The novel revolves around the life of the protagonist Saleem, who is the son of a Tahsildar and belongs to a very influential yet virtuous joint-family. The First part of the novel is all about the childhood of the protagonist.

Saleem, being the benchmark of excellence in both academics and sports is brought with a great set of values. After receiving primary education in his village. In order to continue his further studies, he goes to a college where he meets with young enthusiastic individuals of All India Muslim League who have been working for the cause of an Independent State. This cause becomes his aspiration and he goes to the last extent for it.

After the establishment of Pakistan, the story focuses on the atrocities faced by the Muslim migrants. During migration, a combat between the Muslims of Saleem's village, and Sikh militants leads to the death of Saleem's whole family who died while fighting. Saleem survives and goes on with the cause to help the migrants in this journey.

Saleem marries Asmat, the girl Saleem has always been in love with and the sister of his high-school friend Amjad. The novel ends on a very emotional note with Majeed leading a battalion to the Kashmir front and Saleem being extremely grateful and content with his contribution in the establishment of Pakistan.

== Film adaptation ==
In 1979, Khaak Aur Khoon was adapted into a film by the same name directed by Masood Parvez.
