= Naveen Tajik =

Pakistani actress

- نوین تاجک
- Born: Naveen Tajik; 10 February 1950 (age 76); Lahore, Pakistan
- Occupations: Actress; Model
- Years active: 1970 – 1984
- Children: 2

Naveen Tajik is a former Pakistani TV and film actress who is known for playing a role in the TV drama serial Quratul Ain. She was one of the most popular and successful actresses of the 1970s and early 1980s. She also starred in films like Aj Diyan Kurrian (1977), Prince (1978), Parakh (1978), and Khaak Aur Khoon (1979).

== Early life ==
She was born in 1950 at Lahore and from her early childhood, she took considerable interest in show business later she started working as a model. Tajik belonges to a Pakistani Christian family and her father was a military officer.

== Career ==
Naveen started working as a model in 1970 and appeared in many commercials and advertisements for PTV and fashion magazines.

As an actress, she debuted in mid-70s with a PTV drama Quratul Ain which was written by Ashfaq Ahmed. Later, she opted for a career in Lollywood and her first film was a Punjabi comic movie, Aj Diyan Kurrian (Today's Girls), released in 1977.

In 1978, director S. Suleman cast her in his movie Prince in which she played a role of actor Nadeem's sister. In 1979, she played a central role in the movie Khaak Aur Khoon. She also appeared in several other Urdu and Punjabi movies.

In 1984, Tajik quit the film industry and moved to the United States.

== Personal life ==
Tajik is married and lives in the United States.

== Filmography ==
=== Television serials ===
Year	Title	Role	Network
1974	Aik Mohabbat So Afsanay	Sonia	PTV
1975	Beena Ki Duniya	Beena	PTV
1984	Khul Ja Sim Sim	Lubna	PTV

=== Film ===
Year	Film	Language
1977	Aj Diyan Kurrian	Punjabi
1978	Ghazi Ilmuddin Shaheed	Punjabi
1978	Parakh	Urdu
1978	Prince	Urdu
1979	Khaak Aur Khoon	Urdu
1979	Pakeeza	Urdu
1979	Kis Naam Say Pukarun	Urdu
1979	Nazr-e-Karm	Urdu
1979	Khak Aur Khoon	Urdu
1980	Hey Yeh Shohar	Urdu
1981	Kala Dhanda Goray Log	Urdu
1981	Watan	Urdu
1981	Manzil	Urdu
