= Surraya Bhopali =

1976 film

- Directed by: Hassan Tariq
- Written by: Agha Hassan Imtisal
- Screenplay by: Hassan Tariq
- Produced by: Hassan Shah
- Starring: Rani; Shahid; Waheed Murad; Aslam Pervaiz; Ishrat Chaudhary; Husna; Allauddin; Talish
- Cinematography: Nabi Ahmad
- Edited by: Munawar Ahmad
- Music by: A. Hameed
- Release date: 16 July 1976 (Pakistan)
- Country: Pakistan
- Language: Urdu

Suryya Bhopali is a Pakistani musical romantic film directed by Hassan Tariq, who also wrote the screenplay.

The film stars Rani in title role, alongside Shahid, with Waheed Murad in a supporting role. The film's song Tha Yaqeen Ke Ayaingee Yeh Raatan Kabhi gained widespread popularity. The music was composed by A. Hameed, with Mehdi Hassan and Nahid Akhtar lending their voice to the songs.

In 2016, Lok Virsa Museum screened the film as part of special showcase of the feature films in the country.

== Plot ==
It tells the story of a qawali singer from Bhopal who falls in love with the son of a Nawab when she is invited to perform at the Nawab's residence.

== Cast ==
- Rani Begum as Surraya Bhopali
- Shahid as Nawabzada Yousuf
- Waheed Murad as Dildar
- Husna as Shehla
- Aslam Pervaiz
- Ishrat Chaudhary
- Bahar Begum
- Allauddin
- Talish
- Nirala
- Saqi

== Music ==
All lyrics are written by Saifuddin Saif; all music is composed by A. Hameed

No.	Title	Singer (s)	Length
1.	"Tha Yaqeen Ke Aayaingee Yeh Raatan Kabhi"	Nahid Akhtar
2.	"Kahe Bethe Ho"	Mehnaz Hoosein, Nahid Akhtar
3.	"Ho Duniya Nai Hai"	Mehnaz Hoosein, Nahid Akhtar
4.	"Hum Jo Aab Ke"	Nahid Akhtar
5.	"Ishq Haqeeqat"	Mehdi Hassan, Mala, Munir Hussain
6.	"Naam Aaye Na Tera Pyar Ki Ruswai Mein"	Mehdi Hassan
7.	"Jis Taraf Aankh Uthaon, Teri Tasweeran Hai"	Mehdi Hassan, Nahid Akhtar

== Reception ==
=== Critical reception ===
The Statesman included it among the films of the year that were from good directors but disappoint.
