= Pakistan International Airlines Flight 8303 =

2020 aviation accident in Pakistan

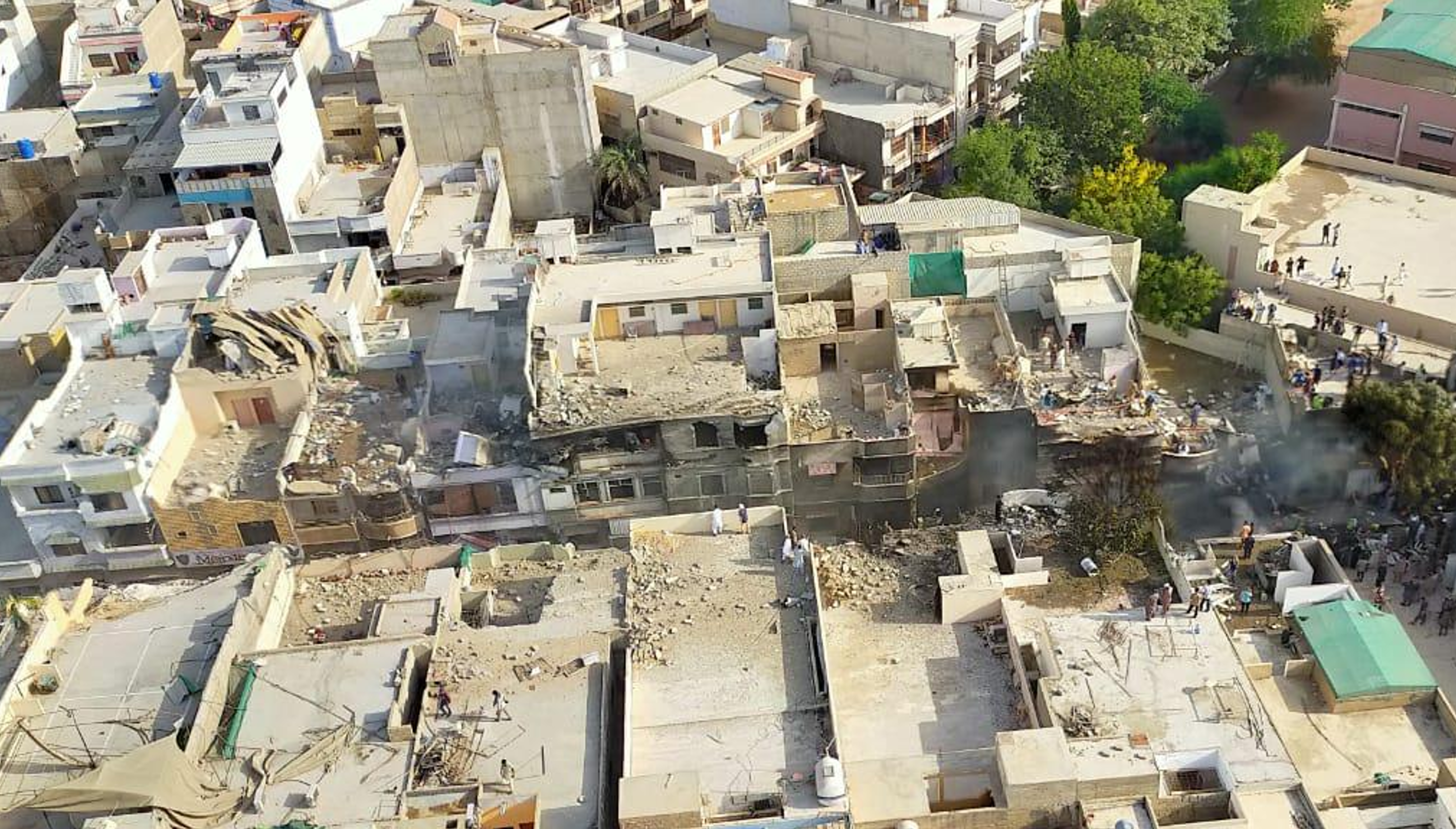
- Aerial view of the crash site

Accident
- Date: 22 May 2020
- Summary: Crashed due to pilot error after dual engine failure following belly landing and go-around
- Site: Model Colony, near Jinnah International Airport, Karachi, Pakistan; 24°54′42.1″N 67°11′19″E
- Total fatalities: 98
- Total injuries: 5

Aircraft
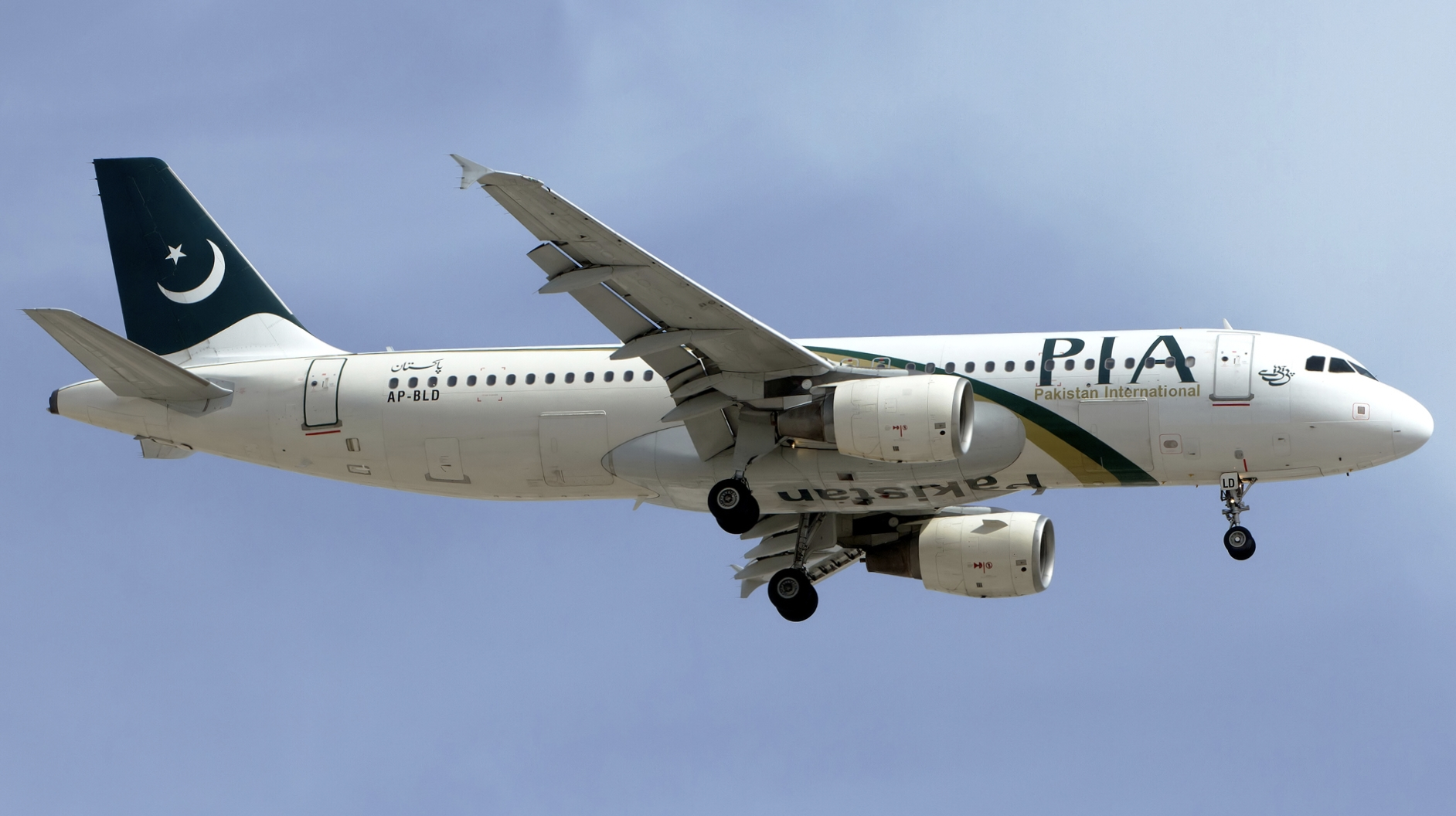
- AP-BLD, the aircraft involved in the accident, seen in February 2020
- Aircraft type: Airbus A320-214
- Operator: Pakistan International Airlines
- IATA flight No.: PK8303
- ICAO flight No.: PIA8303
- Call sign: PAKISTAN 8303
- Registration: AP-BLD
- Flight origin: Allama Iqbal International Airport, Lahore, Pakistan
- Destination: Jinnah International Airport, Karachi, Pakistan
- Occupants: 99
- Passengers: 91
- Crew: 8
- Fatalities: 97
- Injuries: 2
- Survivors: 2

Ground casualties
- Ground fatalities: 1
- Ground injuries: 3

On 22 May 2020, Pakistan International Airlines Flight 8303, a scheduled domestic passenger flight from Lahore to Karachi, crashed while on approach to Jinnah International Airport, killing 97 out of the 99 people on board as well as an additional person on the ground. The aircraft, an Airbus A320 with 91 passengers and 8 crew members on board, was on an unstable approach to Jinnah International Airport, with an excessively high airspeed and altitude. The aircraft subsequently belly landed nearly half-way down the airport runway before the flight crew conducted a go-around. During the go-around, both engines started to fail due to damage sustained during the belly landing. Whilst attempting to land back on the runway, the aircraft lost airspeed and crashed into buildings in Kazimabad. All 8 crew members and 89 out of the 91 passengers on board were killed by the impact and post-crash fire. One person who was inside the buildings died ten days after the crash due to burn injuries.

The investigation, conducted by the Aircraft Accident Investigation Board of Pakistan, determined that both the captain and first officer made multiple errors over an extended period during both the approach and landing. The crew lacked crew resource management, which led to unsafe flight operations and a lack of adherence to standard operating procedures. The investigators determined that the crew's actions resulted in the aircraft being significantly above the required glide slope approach path for the runway. The flight crew disregarded air traffic control instructions and continued an unstable approach. The improper position of the approach path and the configuration of the aircraft then caused the autopilot to disengage. In response to the high descent rate and numerous warnings from the ground proximity warning system, the first officer raised the landing gear and speed brakes in an attempt to go around. He did not verbalise his actions to the captain, nor did he follow up with the proper go-around procedure. The captain continued with the landing, and the aircraft contacted the surface of the runway multiple times. This resulted in severe damage to the engines, which led to a failure of both engines and electrical generators as the aircraft then climbed away from the runway. The crew were now attempting to return to the airport, but with damaged engines and at a critical altitude, the plane was simply too low and too slow to go around for a successful landing. The aircraft continued to lose airspeed before crashing into a row of buildings 4,410 ft (1,340 m) from the threshold of the runway.

== Background ==
=== Aircraft ===
The aircraft involved in the accident was an Airbus A320-214, built by Airbus Industrie in 2004, with registration AP-BLD and manufacturer serial number 2274. It was powered by two CFM International CFM56-5B4 engines manufactured by CFM International. The left engine was installed in February 2019 while the right engine was installed in May 2019. The aircraft had a total of 47,124 airframe hours and 25,866 flight cycles before the accident flight, of which 18,632 airframe hours and 8,353 flight cycles were at Pakistan International Airlines (PIA).

The last routine maintenance check on the aircraft before the accident was conducted by PIA's engineering department on 21 March 2020, and the last major check before the accident occurred on 19 October 2019, during which no defects were found in its engines, landing gear or avionics. From 22 March to 6 May 2020, the plane had remained grounded owing to flight cancellations amid the COVID-19 pandemic. From 7 May onward, the plane had conducted six flights. On the day prior to the accident, the plane had operated a flight from Muscat in Oman to Lahore in Pakistan. The aircraft had a valid certificate of airworthiness and certificate of maintenance review at the time of the accident.

=== Crew and passengers ===
Passengers and crew by nationality
Nationality	Passengers	Crew	Total
Pakistan	90	8	98
United States	1	0	1
Total	91	8	99

Two pilots were in command of the flight. The captain of the flight was 58-year-old Sajjad Gul. Gul had 17,252 flight hours, 7,044 of which were when he was pilot-in-command and 4,783 of which were on the Airbus A320. He joined PIA in March 1996 after getting his medical certificate from the Civil Aviation Medical Board in 1987. He flew as a first officer on the Fokker F27, Boeing 737, Airbus A310, and Boeing 777. He was promoted to a captain in 2013, first on ATR aircraft, then on the Airbus A320 in 2015. He was described by the Pakistan Airline Pilots Association as one of PIA's most experienced pilots. The first officer of the flight was 33-year-old Usman Azam. Azam had 2,291 flight hours, 2,132 of which were when he was pilot-in-command and 1,504 of which were on the Airbus A320. He joined PIA in August 2010 after getting his medical certificate from the Civil Aviation Medical Board in 2005. He flew as a first officer on ATR aircraft and on the Airbus A320.

In addition to the two flight crew members, there were six flight attendants on board the flight. 91 passengers were on board the flight, consisting of 51 men, 31 women, and 9 children. One passenger was American. Among the passengers were Pakistani model and actress Zara Abid and chief executive officer of the Bank of Punjab Zafar Masud. Five officers from the Pakistan Army and one from the Pakistan Air Force were also on the flight. The flight carried many passengers that wanted to get home to celebrate Eid al-Fitr, an Islamic holiday, after flight disruptions due to nationwide lockdowns as part of the COVID-19 pandemic in the country.

=== Jinnah International Airport ===
Jinnah International Airport approach charts

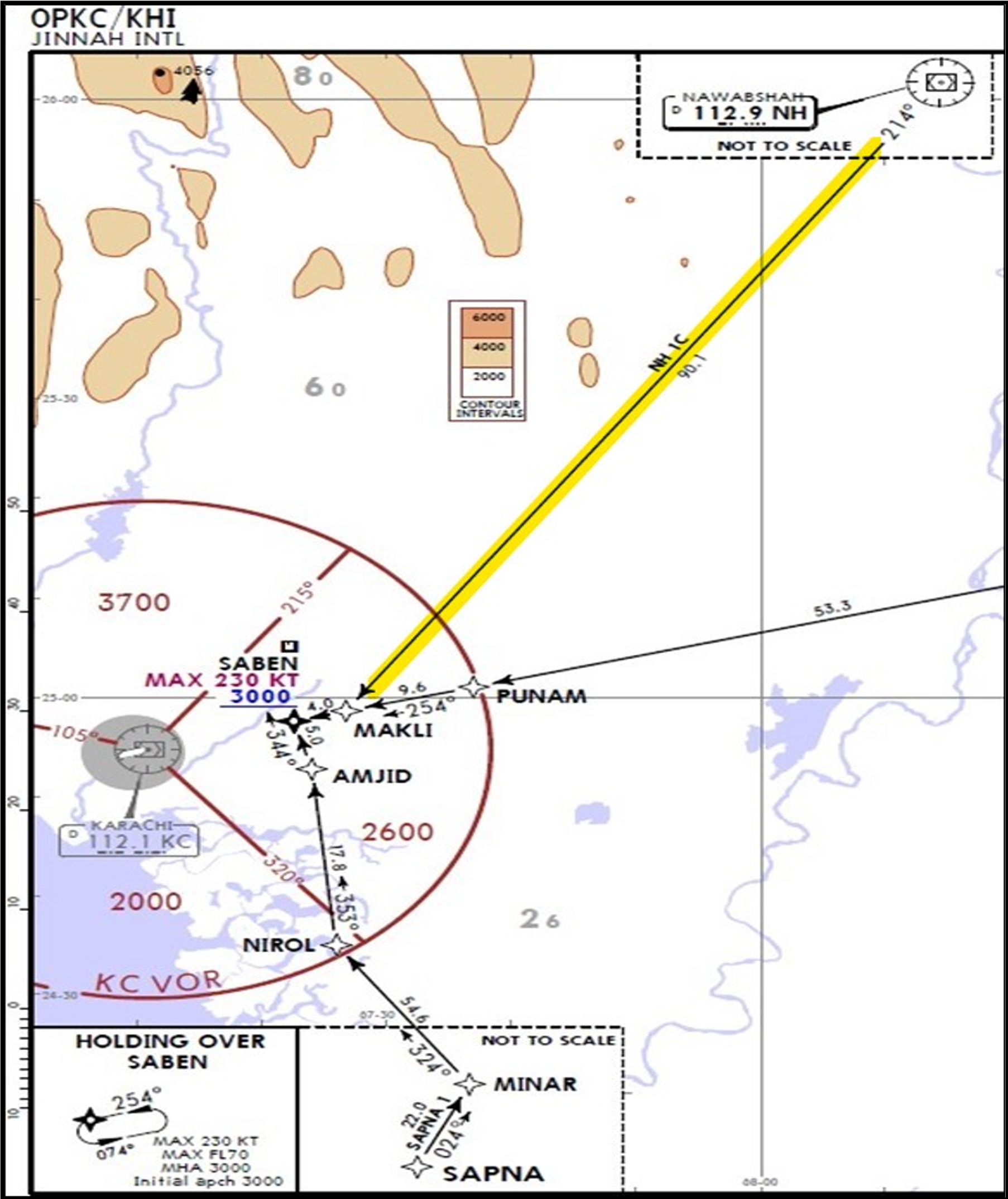
Arrival chart

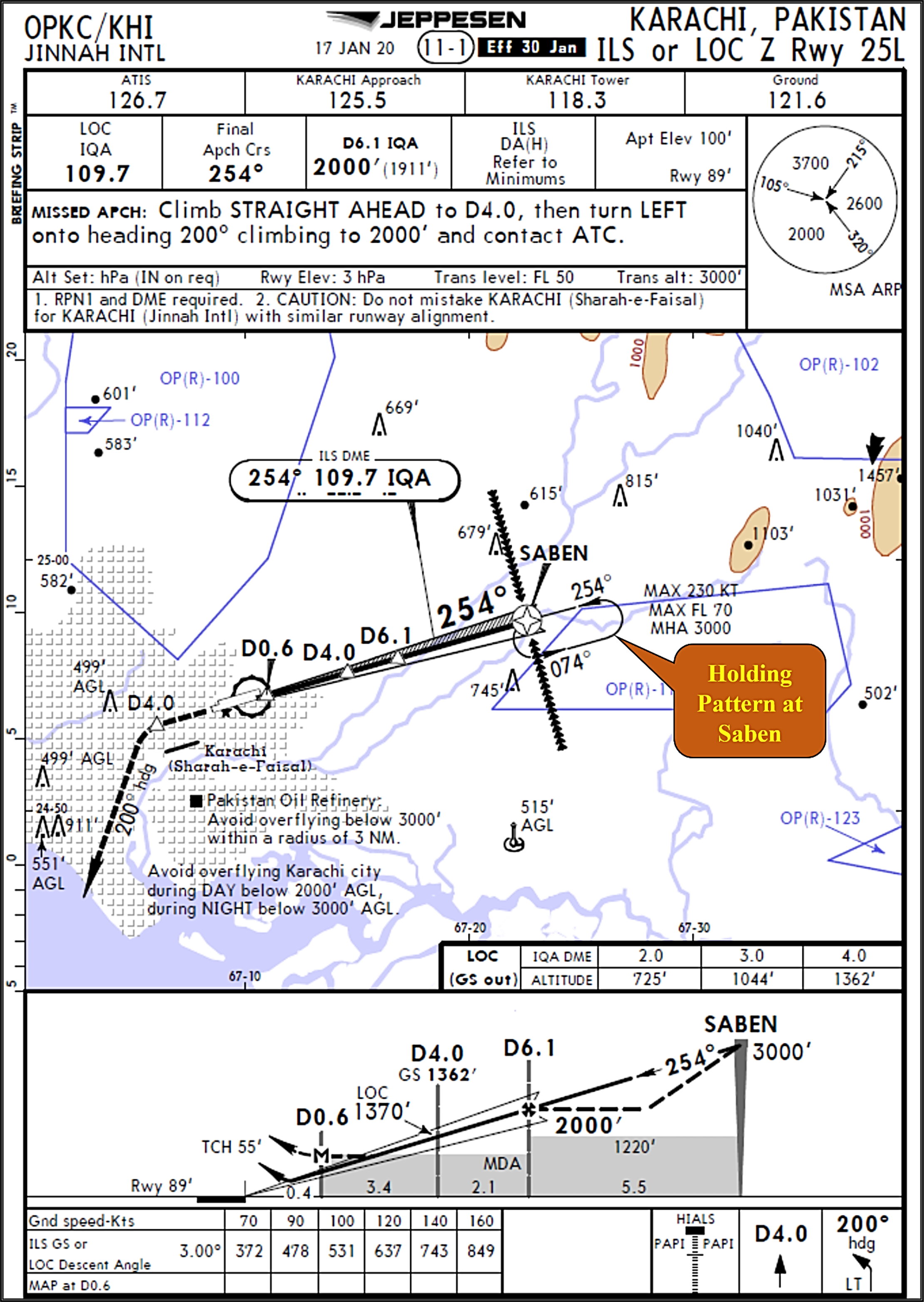
Approach chart

The arrival chart for Jinnah International Airport and the approach chart for Runway 25L, with the Nawabshah VOR, the waypoints MAKLI and SABEN, the holding pattern around SABEN, and the profile view of the glideslope of Runway 25L labeled

Jinnah International Airport has two runways, Runway 07L/25R and Runway 07R/25L, of which the latter is the longest, with a length of 11,200 ft (3,400 m). An approach to Runway 25L starts at the Nawabshah VOR, which is located approximately 112.9 nmi (209.1 km) northeast from the airport. After passing the VOR, the inbound flight would proceed to waypoint MAKLI, located 15.3 nmi (28.3 km) from the threshold of Runway 25L. Following this, the aircraft would turn right towards waypoint SABEN, which is located 11.4 nmi (21.1 km) from the runway threshold. The designated altitude for aircraft crossing SABEN was 3,000 ft (910 m) to safely intercept the 3° glideslope for the runway. If at SABEN, the aircraft was still above 3,000 ft (910 m), they would be required to enter a holding pattern in order to lose altitude.

=== Airbus A320 flight control unit ===
The Airbus A320 has a flight control unit (FCU), an interface on the glareshield of the cockpit. It is the primary interface that allows the flight crew to interact with the flight computers, engage and disengage the autopilot and autothrust, and change other flight parameters. The FCU has four knobs that can change the aircraft's airspeed, altitude, heading, and vertical speed. The knobs can be pushed in or out to the autopilot mode for that setting to either selected or managed guidance.

When one of the knobs is pulled out after a value is selected, selected mode will engage. In selected mode, the autopilot will maintain the value selected until it is changed by the pilots. When one of the knobs is pushed in after a value is selected, managed mode will engage. In managed mode, the autopilot determines the flight path based on pre-programmed information in the flight management system (FMS). For instance, a pilot could push the heading knob in, and the autopilot would manage the aircraft's heading in order to follow the track in the FMS.

When the altitude knob is pushed in with a selected altitude lower than the aircraft's current altitude, descent mode (DES mode) will activate. In DES mode, the aircraft will follow the descent profile as programmed into the FMS. Depending on the total distance available for descent, DES mode will lower the rate of descent in order to capture the selected altitude safely.

In selected mode, open descent mode can be engaged. In open descent, the auto thrust will reduce the engine power to idle thrust while the autopilot pitches the aircraft's nose up or down in order to achieve a selected speed. Open descent is prohibited from being used on final approach.

== Accident ==
=== First approach ===
The flight, with callsign "Pakistan 8303", departed Allama Iqbal International Airport in Lahore at 13:05:30 with First Officer Azam as the designated pilot flying and Captain Gul as the designated pilot monitoring. The flight soon climbed to its cruising altitude of 34,000 ft (10,400 m). At 13:24, the flight crew made contact with Karachi area control and were told to expect an instrument landing system (ILS) approach to Runway 25L. After the aircraft crossed Nawabshah at 14:15:38, air traffic control (ATC) cleared the crew to start descending to 10,000 ft (3,050 m) and fly direct to MAKLI. The crew engaged DES mode by turning the altitude knob to 10,000 ft (3,050 m) and pushing it in. At 14:18:36, the selected altitude changed to 5,000 ft (1,520 m) and the descent rate increased from 1,000 ft/min (305 m/min) to 2,400 ft/min (732 m/min). As the aircraft approached MAKLI at 14:23:16, ATC instructed the flight crew to contact Karachi Approach on frequency 125.5 MHz. However, the crew accidentally set their radios to 126.5 and did not respond to radio calls from ATC. For the next minute, ATC called Flight 8303 three times, and an additional PIA aircraft also tried to call them, but without any response. Afterward, ATC called the flight crew on guard frequency three times. The flight crew responded to the third call and properly contacted Karachi Approach.

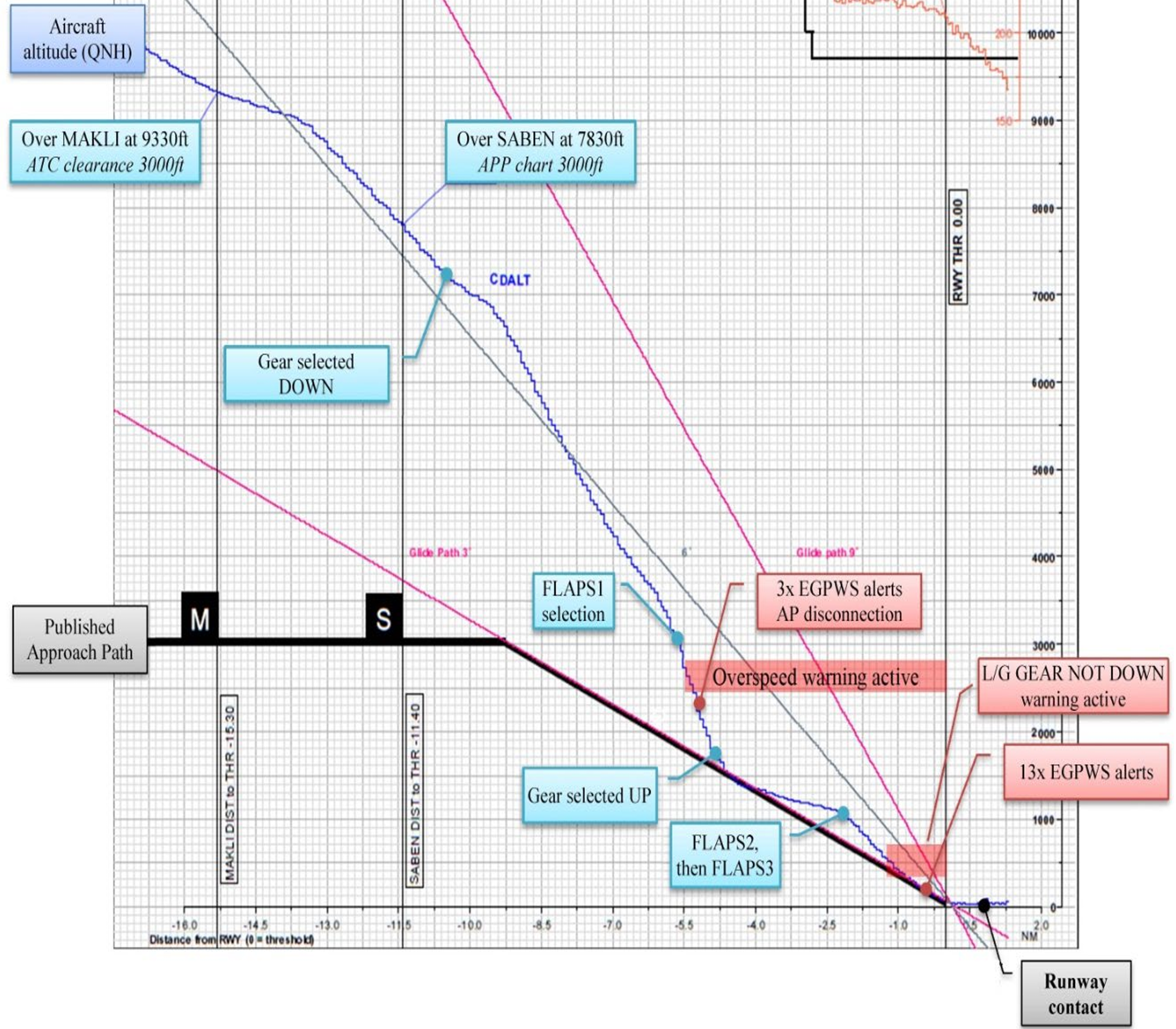
A diagram showing the flight's altitude compared to its distance from the runway threshold

After communication was re-established, Karachi approach cleared the flight to descend down to 3,000 ft (914 m) and an ILS approach to Runway 25L at 14:25:54. At this time, the aircraft was still above 15,000 ft (4,570 m). At 14:30:22, the aircraft was 16 nautical miles (29.6 km) from the threshold of Runway 25L at an altitude of 9,363 ft (2,850 m). At this time, the localizer capture (LOC) mode was automatically engaged. In LOC mode, the aircraft will follow the localizer signal for the runway it is approaching and override the track inputted into NAV mode. In the case of Flight 8303, this meant that the holding pattern around SABEN and its associated track miles would no longer be flown. This reduced the true amount of track miles the aircraft would have to fly from MAKLI to the threshold of Runway 25L from 38 nmi (70.4 km) to 15 nmi (27.8 km). However, this change was not reflected in the FMS, and the aircraft continued to descend at a descent rate corresponding to a 38 nmi (70.4 km) distance rather than a 15 nmi (27.8 km) distance. This resulted in the descent rate becoming too low to safely intercept the glideslope. ATC recognized that the flight was too high and asked them, "Pakistan 8303 confirm track mile comfortable for descent?" Captain Gul replied with "Affirm." Directly afterward, Gul exclaimed to First Officer Azam, "What has happened? Stop, stop, oh no! Take out the hold, take out the hold, take out the hold, take out the hold". Azam responded with, "Hold taken out, should we report this happening [to air traffic control]?" Captain Gul replied, "No, this could be due to hold, tell Karachi Approach that [we're] established on localizer."

At 14:30:44, one of the flight crew members engaged the open descent with a target of 3,000 ft (914 m) mode despite it being disallowed on approach. A few seconds later, the speed brakes were extended in order to increase drag on the aircraft. The crew selected a target airspeed of 255 kn (472 km/h), although the aircraft was at 9,210 ft (2,810 m); this action violated the 250 kn (463 km/h) airspeed limitation for aircraft below 10,000 ft (3,050 m). At 14:31:13, Karachi Tower contacted Karachi Approach—the ATC in contact with the flight—and said, "Sir, it's too high," with Karachi Approach responding with, "Yes, it is too high and I am observing it and will give orbit." Karachi Approach then called out to the flight and said, "Pakistan 8303 report level passing". Captain Gul replied, "Out of 75 for 3,000". However, their altitude at this point was around 7,700 ft (2,350 m), not 7,500 ft (2,290 m). At this time, the aircraft passed over SABEN at 7,830 ft (2,390 m), over twice as high as it should have been. At 14:31:34, 10.4 nmi (19.3 km) from the runway threshold, and 7,440 ft (2,270 m) high, the landing gear lever was moved into the down position, although without any verbalization by either of the flight crew members. The extra drag caused by the landing gear deployment resulted in the aircraft pitching down from just under 0° nose down to 7.4° nose down and a descent rate 7,500 ft/min (2,290 m/min) in order to maintain the selected airspeed. Seven seconds later, ATC called the flight and told them, "Sir, orbit is available if you want," In the cockpit, Captain Gul told First Officer Azam to, "Say it's OK." Azam then told ATC, "Negative sir, we are comfortable, we can make it inshallah." Gul then said to Azam, "He will be surprised what we have done," referring to air traffic controller and how he wanted to land on their current unstable approach.

At 14:32:25, ATC instructed the flight with, "Pakistan 8303, disregard, turn left heading 180." The flight crew replied with "Sir, we are comfortable now, and we are out of 3,500 for 3,000, established ILS 25L," although their actual altitude was 3,900 ft (1,190 m). The controller once again called the flight crew and said, "Negative, turn left heading 180," but this instruction was again ignored with the response of, "Sir, we are established on ILS 25L." At this moment, the aircraft was passing through 3,090 ft (942 m) just 5.7 nmi (10.6 km) from the runway threshold and had a pitch of 12.6° nose down. Although the selected airspeed was 225 kn (417 km/h), the aircraft had an airspeed of 242 kn (448 km/h). This resulted in an "overspeed" warning after the flaps were extended. Soon afterward, the aircraft's pitch reached 13.7° nose down and the autopilot disconnected, without a response from either crew member. At 14:32:52, the first ground proximity warning system (GPWS) warnings started to sound in the cockpit; first a "sink rate!" then two "pull up!" warnings. First Officer Azam then started to command his sidestick two-thirds nose up, which brought the descent rate from 7,400 ft/min (2,260 m/min) to 2,000 ft/min (610 m/min) and increased to pitch to nearly 0°. Four seconds later, he raised the landing gear and speed brakes without any verbalization to Captain Gul. Near simultaneously, ATC cleared the flight to land on Runway 25L.

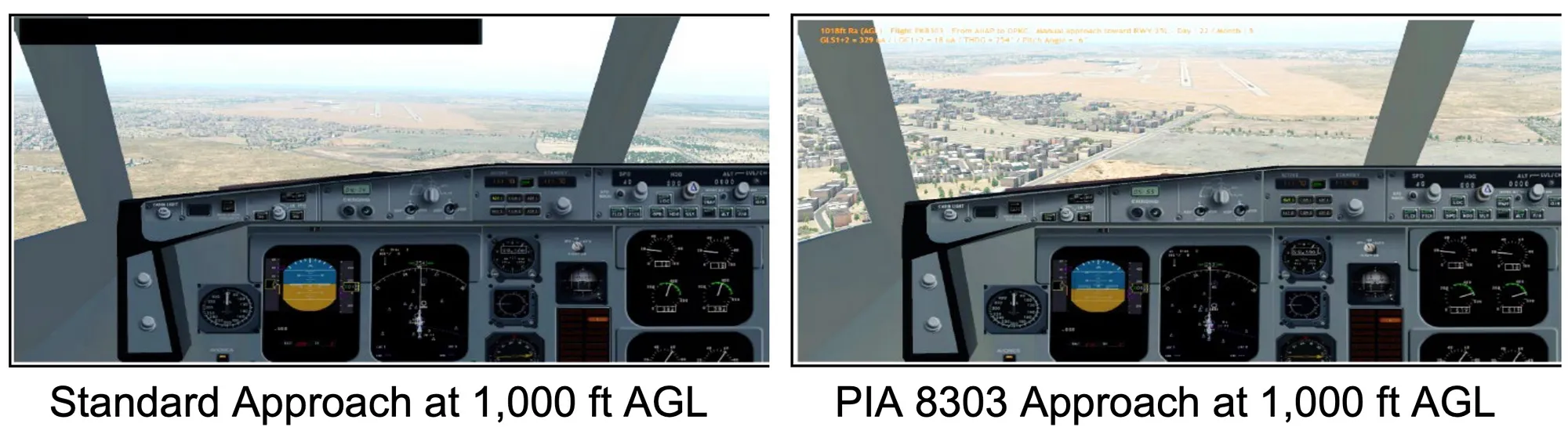
Simulated view of a comparison between a stabilized approach and the approach of Flight 8303, both at 1,000 ft (305 m)

As the aircraft continued its approach, the flaps were extended to configuration 2 and two seconds later, configuration 3. This action resulted more overspeed warnings as they were extended at 232 kn (430 km/h), beyond the maximum safe airspeed speed of 200 kn (370 km/h) and 189 kn (350 km/h) respectively. At 14:33:33, First Officer Azam asked Captain Gul, "Should we do the orbit?" Gul replied with, "No-no, leave it," before taking over the controls and making nose-down inputs on his sidestick unannounced. This was despite him being the designated pilot monitoring who should not have been manipulating the controls; Gul doing so resulted in a dual input situation where both pilots were making control inputs at the same time. As the aircraft was passing through 750 ft (229 m) at a distance of 1.5 nmi (2.78 km) from the runway, the "landing gear not down" warning sounded in the cockpit, a related message appeared on the electronic centralised aircraft monitor (ECAM) and the landing gear down arrow illuminated red. Three seconds later, Gul told Azam to, "Cancel it," referring to the overspeed aural warning. The aural warning was cancelled but the aural warning related to the landing gear triggered three seconds later. The GPWS then started to produce a sequence of thirteen GPWS warnings, ten "too low terrain!", one "sink rate!", and two "pull up!" warnings. At 14:34:16, the aircraft flew over the threshold of Runway 25L at 24 ft (7.32 m) and 205 kn (380 km/h); all GPWS warnings were inhibited as the aircraft was below 30 ft (9.14 m). While still 7 ft (2.13 m), reverse thrust was selected on both engines, but did not deploy as the aircraft was still in the air.

=== Landing and go-around ===
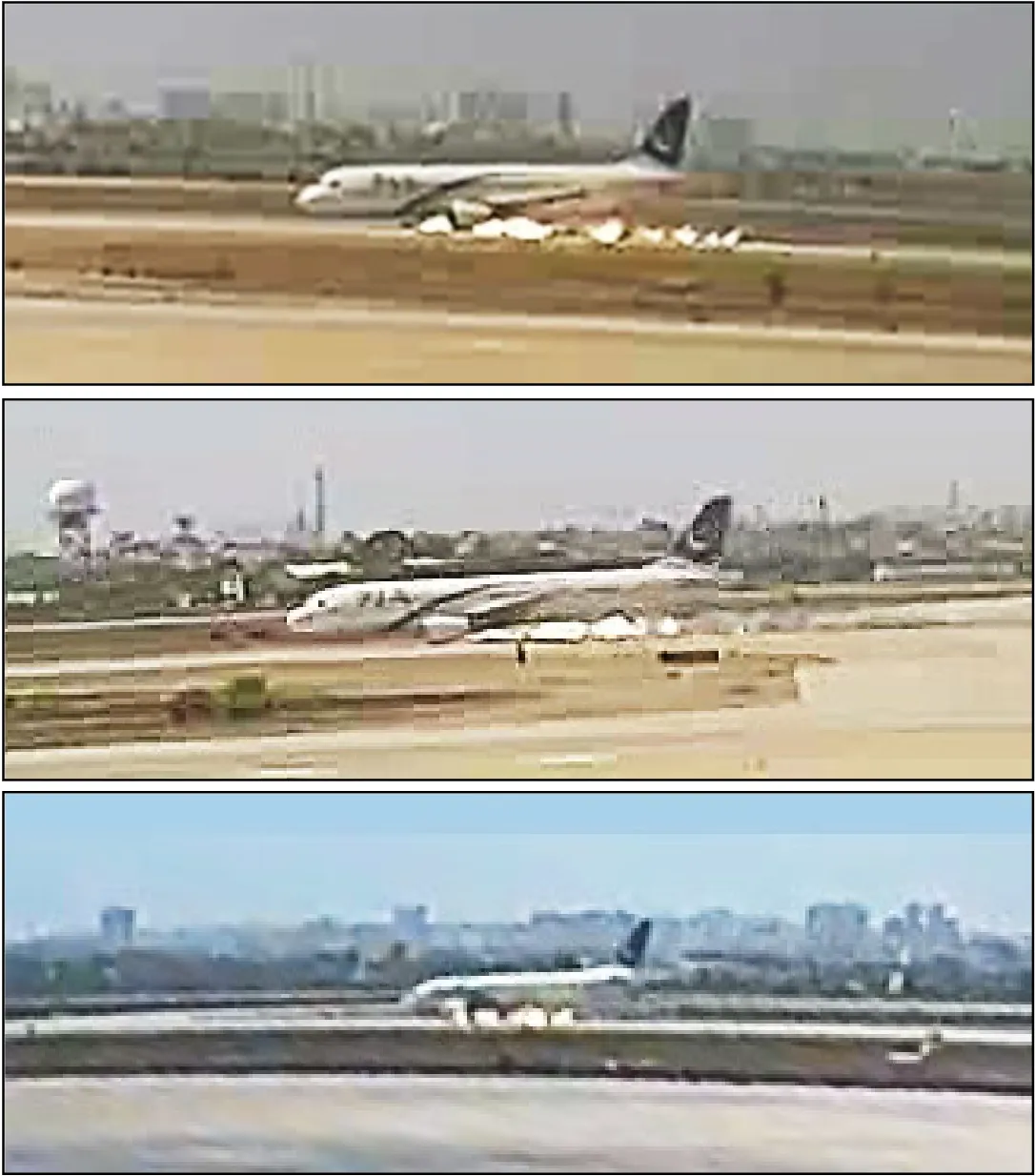
The aircraft as seen on CCTV footage skidding down Runway 25L

The aircraft belly landed at 14:34:28 approximately 4,500 ft (1,370 m) down Runway 25L. The engines, slung under the wing, made contact with the runway surface. A runway inspection done after the accident showed that the left engine scraped the runway first, followed by the right engine at 5,500 feet (1,680 m). Two seconds after the first contact, maximum braking on the landing gear was applied even though it was still retracted inside the aircraft. Captain Gul applied full nose-down command to his sidestick while First Officer Azam applied two-thirds nose-up command on his sidestick. The result was a pitch of 4° nose down when the brakes were applied. As the vibrations on both engines started to increase, the engine two fire warning triggered with its associated aural warning, master caution warning light, and ECAM message activating. Simultaneously, the engine 2 AC generator started to fail, resulting in the aircraft's electrical system being reconfigured to run solely on the engine one generator.

Fourteen seconds after the aircraft belly landed, First Officer Azam exclaimed to Captain Gul, "Take off sir, take off!" Two seconds later, the thrust levers were advanced to takeoff go-around thrust (TOGA). Engine one accelerated to TOGA power but engine two failed to accelerate past idle thrust due to a failed engine control unit that was damaged during its contact with the runway. The aircraft got airborne at 14:34:45 with significant damage to its engines. Dual inputs on the sidestick stopped and Gul was the pilot flying for the rest of the flight. As the aircraft was climbing through 58 ft (17.7 m), a "too low, gear" warning sounded. The position of the gear lever moved from up to down then back to up in reaction, but the position of the landing gear did not change. The crew then declared that they were conducting a go-around to Karachi Approach.

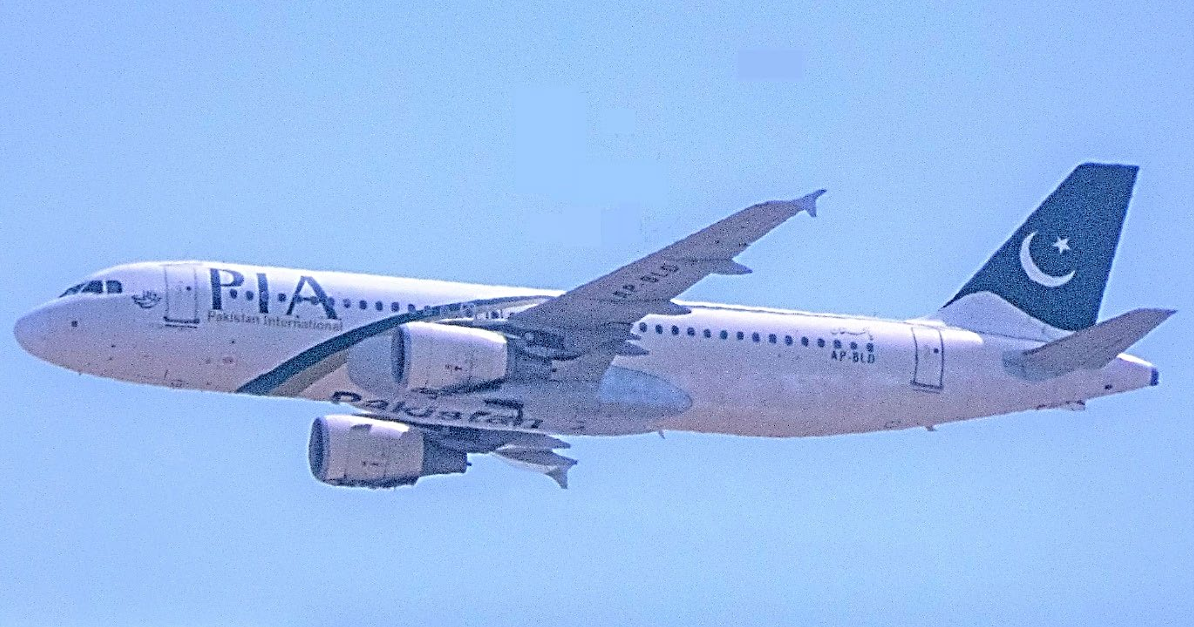
The aircraft in-flight, minutes before the crash, with damage to its engines and the ram air turbine deployed

At 14:35:10, as the aircraft climbed through 442 ft (135 m), both N1 fan rotation speed indications reached 94% as engine two managed to advance to TOGA power. However, the damage sustained to the gear boxes on the underside of both engines caused the engine oil to reduce by 75% on engine one (left engine) and 67% on engine two (right engine). This initially resulted in an engine one low oil pressure warning which was quickly followed by the same warning for the right engine. As they climbed, the flight crew contacted Karachi Approach and said, "Request heading for Pakistan 8303 we would like to come again for ILS 25L," to which they replied with, "Roger, turn left heading 110, climb 3,000." The aircraft started to turn left for a second approach attempt.

=== Second approach attempt and crash ===
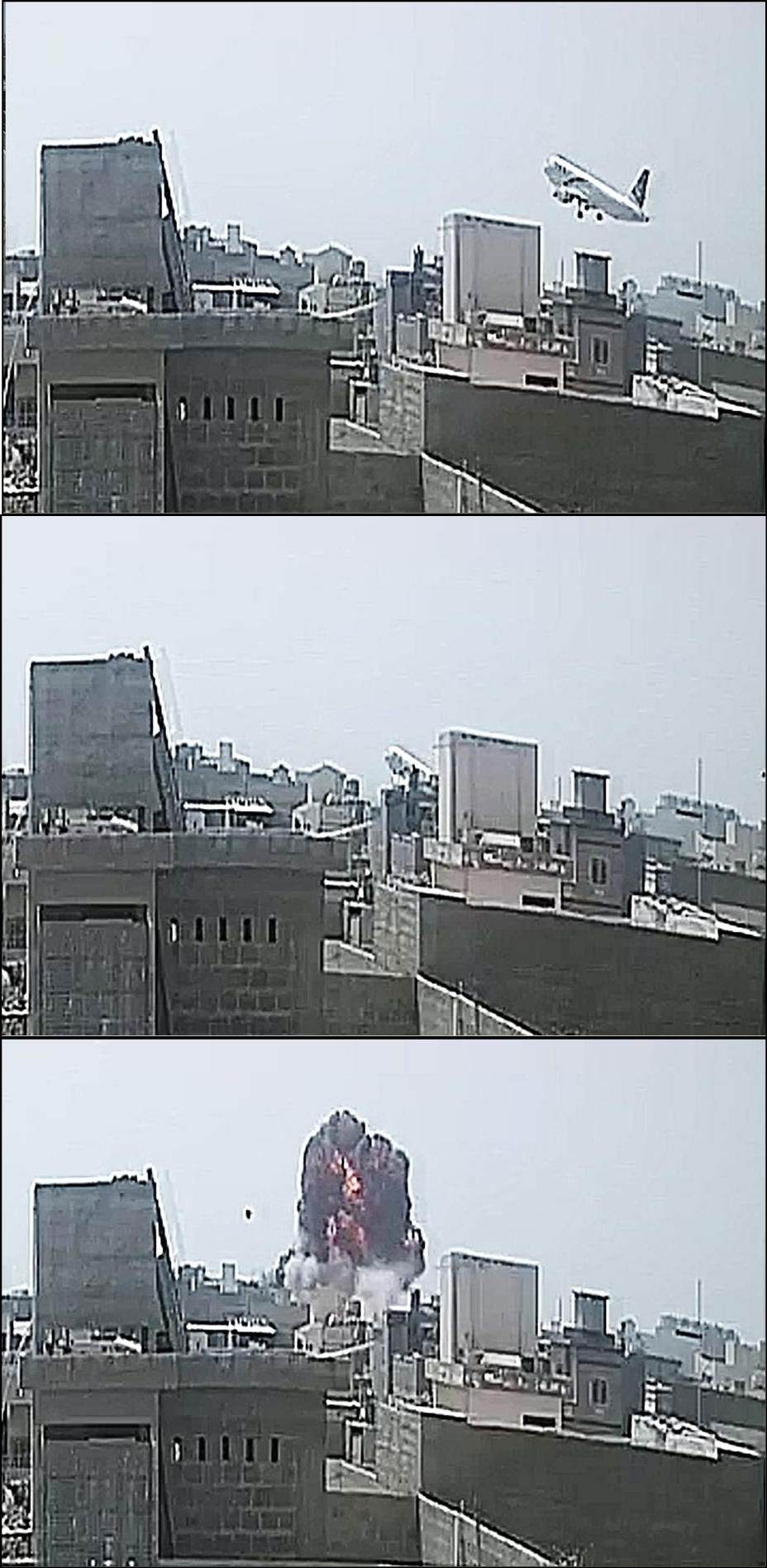
CCTV footage of the crash

As the aircraft passed through 2,670 ft (814 m) at 14:36, the left engine started to lose power and suffered an uncommanded in-flight shutdown. However, First Officer Azam said, "Thrust lever number two idle, move number two to idle," despite the right engine still operating near maximum power. The crew then reduced power on engine two. Seconds later, the engine one generator failed as the engine stopped producing sufficient power. The failure of both generators resulted in a total electrical failure on board the aircraft. The digital flight data recorder (DFDR) and cockpit voice recorder (CVR) stopped recording due to the loss of power. In response to the loss of power, the aircraft's ram air turbine (RAT) automatically deployed.

With the left engine failed and the right one producing only idle thrust, the aircraft started to lose airspeed. Starting at 14:36:28, multiple "stall! stall!" warnings sounded in combination with several dual input warnings. Soon after the aircraft descended through 1,900 ft (579 m), the flight crew discussed the status of engine two and after realizing that it was working, the N1 speed on the engine increased from 40% to 76%. (Note: After the failure of the DFDR, engine power could only be determined through audio analysis of CVR. The CVR began to operate again eight seconds after it failed after power was restored to it due to the RAT deploying. The DFDR did not operate again.) First Officer Azam then told Captain Gul to keep the airspeed above 140 kn (259 km/h), the minimum speed for RAT to power the aircraft. Starting at 14:37:59, sounds of an engine stall were heard coming from right and the left engine started to decrease. At 14:38:46, the right engine stopped producing sound and thrust. This was followed by multiple stall warnings. Azam then asked Gul to increase their airspeed, but without engines to increase speed, he replied with, "How would I increase speed?" Azam did not respond.

As the aircraft was descending through 1,500 ft (457 m), and after ATC called them about a left turn, Azam told ATC, "We will be proceeding direct sir, we have lost engines." ATC then asked, "Confirm you are carrying out belly landing?" to which Azam responded with "Negative sir." Gul then asked Azam whether the landing gear was extended. Soon after Azam said no, the landing gear was extended and Azam told the flight attendants to be prepared for landing. At this time, the aircraft was descending through 700 ft (213 m). Seconds later at 14:39:46, Gul said mayday three times without calling ATC before Azam properly transmitted to ATC. He said to them, "Sir, mayday, mayday, mayday, mayday, Pakistan 8303," which was the final communication with the flight. As the aircraft turned left, it lost altitude with the stall warning remaining active until the crash. At 14:40:18, the aircraft crashed into a row of buildings 4,410 ft (1,340 m) from the runway threshold.

The aircraft first collided with a mobile tower before crashing into a street. Most of the wreckage landed in the street although some of the aircraft remained embedded in the buildings. A post-crash fire started and several houses were damaged or destroyed.

=== Immediate aftermath and rescue ===
A full-scale emergency was declared at the airport by ATC and local fire and rescue services arrived at the crash site within ten minutes. The narrow streets and alleys in the area impeded the rescue services. The ISPR, the media wing of the Pakistani military, reported that special forces of the Pakistan Army and Pakistan Rangers had set up a cordon. Video footage of the crash scene showed emergency teams trying to reach the scene amid the rubble. Several houses were damaged or destroyed in the accident. (Note: The exact number of houses damaged or destroyed is disputed. CBS News reported that five or six houses were destroyed. Faisal Edhi of the Edhi Foundation said at least 25 houses suffered damage due to the crash. The spokeswomen for the Sindh Health Department said that 18 houses were destroyed or damaged. An anonymous senior official at the crash site reported to The Guardian that 5 houses were destroyed and 15 others were damaged. The final report only stated that several homes were damaged and did not provide a specific number.) The Sindh Minister of Health and Population Welfare declared a state of emergency for Karachi's hospitals, while Prime Minister Imran Khan ordered all available resources to the crash site, as did the chief of staff of the Pakistan Air Force. Rescue services brought the injured and dead to Civil Hospital, Dar-ul-Sehat Hospital, and the Jinnah Postgraduate Medical Centre. Medical resources were strained due to the effects of the COVID-19 pandemic.

== Victims ==
The day following the accident, Pakistani officials confirmed 97 fatalities on the aircraft. Among the fatalities were Zara Abid and five officers of the Pakistani Army. The two survivors of the accident were sent to Dar-ul-Sehat Hospital and Civil Hospital respectively and were both in stable condition.

On the ground, the spokeswoman of Sindh Health Department reported said eight residents of Model Colony were injured in the crash and most victims' corpses had suffered burns. Due to the fact that the accident occurred on a Friday and most men were at a nearby mosque for Friday morning prayers, most of the ground injuries were women and children. (Note: The final report released by the Aircraft Accident Investigation Board of Pakistan stated that only three people on the ground sustained injuries, which were all labeled serious. However, the spokeswomen for the Sindh Health Department in the immediate aftermath of the accident before the first ground fatality happened stated that eight people on the ground were injured.) Faisal Edhi of the Edhi Foundation said 25–30 people were hospitalized, mostly due to burns. Ten days after the accident, one of the injured people on the ground, a 13-year-old cleaning the upper floor of a house with her two sisters, died in the hospital due to burn injuries.

DNA testing was used to identify most of the victims. Within three weeks of the crash, 95 of the victims were identified by the Forensic Lab of Karachi University and Punjab Forensic Science Agency with two remaining unidentified. The Edhi Foundation reported about 19 bodies being taken away by relatives by force from its morgue, without providing proof to establish identity or waiting for identification through DNA testing. Some families of the victims have alleged that the DNA identification tests carried out by the authorities were improper, accusing them of delay and misidentification.

== Investigation ==
The investigation was conducted by Aircraft Accident Investigation Board of Pakistan (AAIB). Airbus stated they would be providing assistance to the French Bureau of Enquiry and Analysis for Civil Aviation Safety (BEA) who would be helping with the investigation. Subsequently, an 11-member Airbus team visited the crash site on 26 May. The aircraft's DFDR and CVR were recovered from the accident site and flown to France to be analyzed by the BEA.

=== Flight operations ===
Indications of the holding pattern

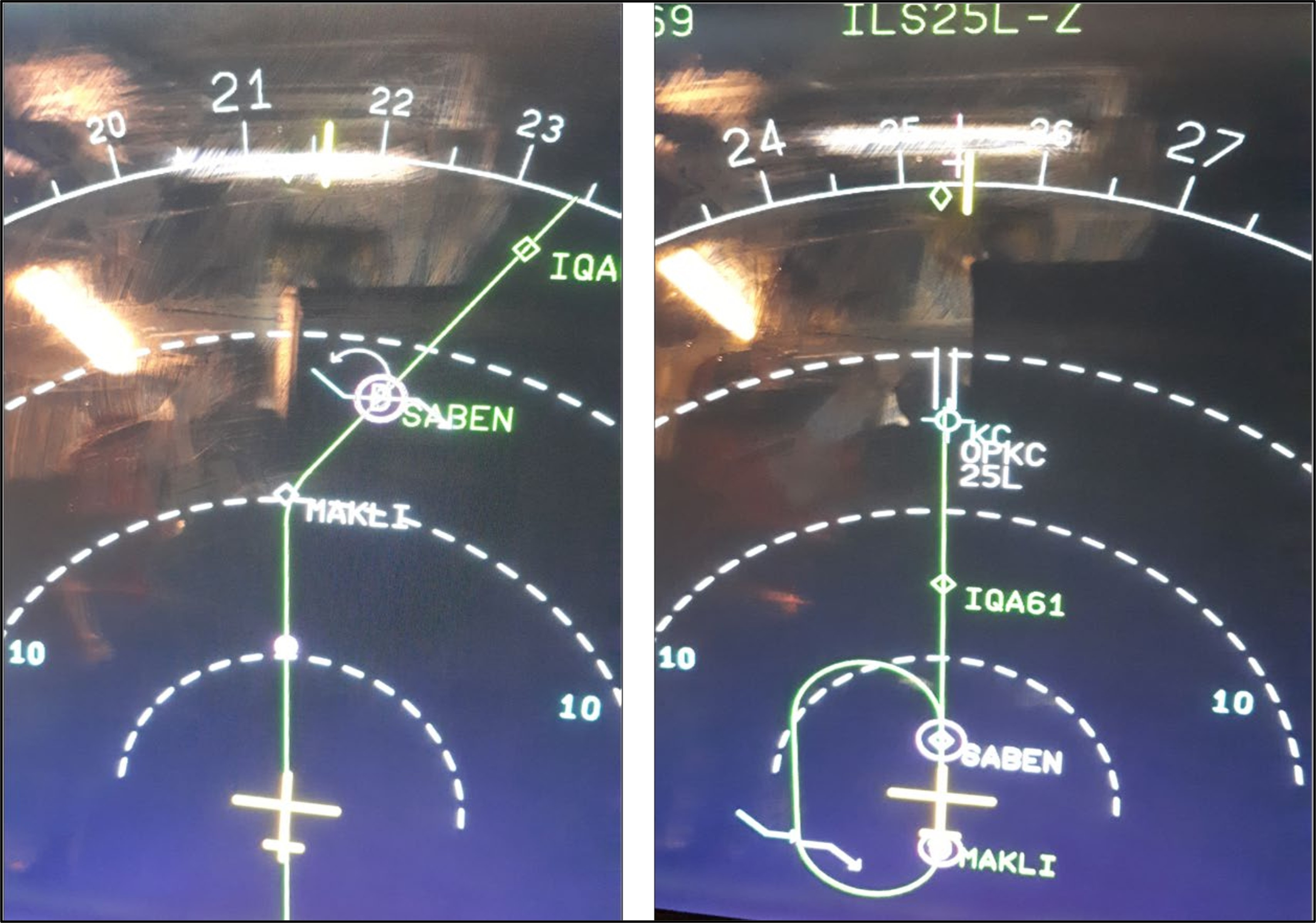
Navigation display

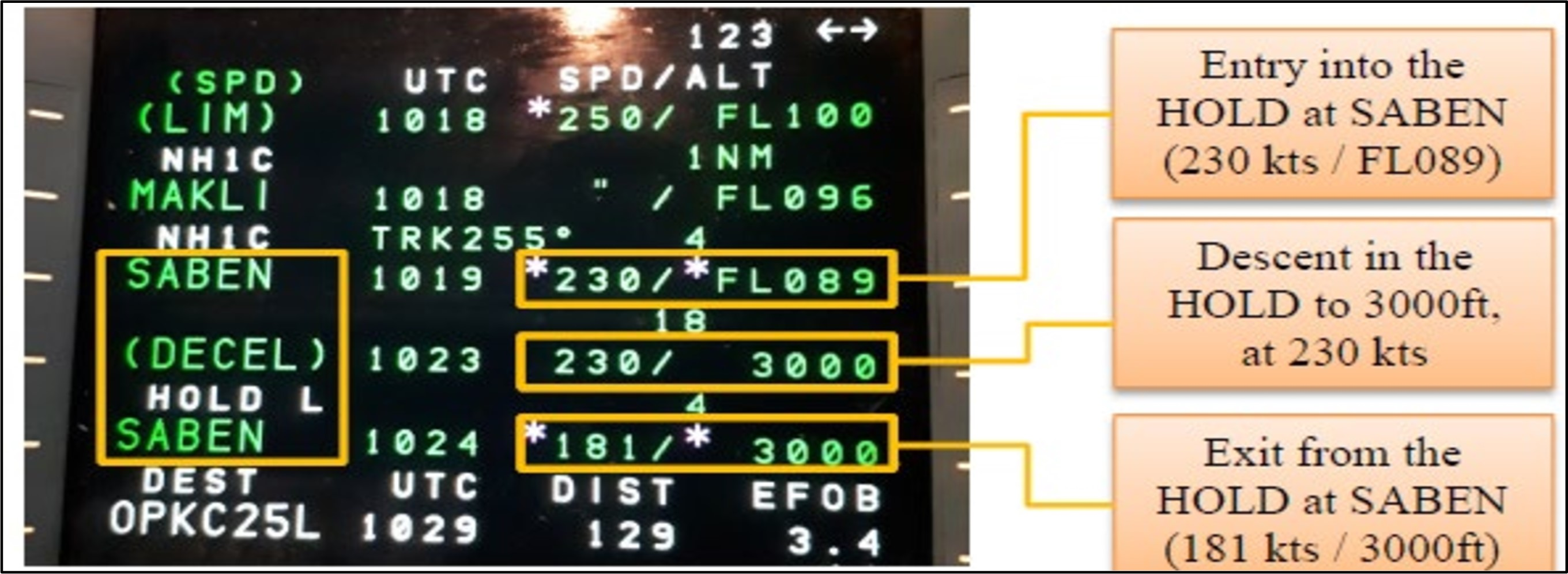
Multi-function control and display unit

The crew had two indications that there was a holding pattern at SABEN to lose altitude: one on the navigation display and one on the multi-function control and display unit. The crew missed both of these indications.

During the flight, the investigation found that the crew disregarded several safety regulations. During the cruise, the CVR revealed that the flight crew engaged in casual conversation, especially about the COVID-19 pandemic. Conversations not relevant to the safety of the flight are not allowed below 10,000 ft (3,000 m) (the sterile cockpit rule), but the flight crew continued to converse. The required approach briefing was never conducted. The AAIB determined that their conversations also resulted in a failure to verbalize changes to the flight mode annunciator (FMA) and the temporary loss of radio contact.

The AAIB deemed that the crew demonstrated a lack of situational awareness and crew resource management (CRM) several times during the descent. The crew did not notice the two indications of the holding pattern at SABEN: one on the navigation display and one on the multi-function control and display unit. The AAIB determined that this resulted in their failure to notice the indicated track miles was greater than the amount the aircraft flew. The investigation also stated that crew were overconfident and complacent as they did not communicate or crosscheck with each other with the position of the aircraft.

The AAIB determined that the crew did not follow standard operating procedures (SOP), which showed when they engaged the open descent mode on final approach despite it being prohibited during that phase of flight. When ATC told the flight about their position, the crew disregarded their suggestion of taking an orbit and continued with the unstable approach. The investigators found that the crew failed to properly consider their options, which was in violation of SOP, and were focused on the approach without considering their altitude, showing a lack of situational awareness. When the autopilot disconnected due to excessive nose down pitch, the CVR indicated that crew failed to verbalize the master caution warning or the FMA caution, and did not establish who was in control of the aircraft. Despite the required procedure after a GPWS activation being to initiate a terrain escape manoeuvre to climb away from the terrain, the recorders showed that the crew failed to do so after the GPWS activated. The AAIB deemed this to be demonstrating their lack of situational awareness in relation to the position of the aircraft.

After First Officer Azam raised the landing gear and speed brakes, the CVR showed that he did not inform Captain Gul, who remained insistent on landing the aircraft. Neither recorder showed the crew acknowledging the master caution warnings after the extension of the flaps, the "landing gear not down" ECAM warning, or conducting an orbit at the instruction of ATC. Despite being on an unstabilized approach, the CVR recorded no callouts about the aircraft's position, a violation of SOPs according to the AAIB. Gul assuming control over the aircraft without any callouts showed improper CRM as the CVR showed there was no conversation about who was actually in control of the flight.

During the landing attempt, full reverse thrust was selected on both engines despite the aircraft still being airborne, against SOP. The flight crew then initiated a go-around despite being on the ground for 18 seconds. This was against standard procedure, which dictates that flight crews must not go around after reverse thrust selection. The AAIB deemed that the crew demonstrated poor airmanship by deciding to go around after the engine two fire warning rather than trying to stop on the runway. After the go around, the investigators determined that the crew failed to properly discuss the gear-up landing or a second approach to runway 25L, demonstrating a lack of situational awareness. The lack of situational awareness was also shown when the DFDR recorded the crew reducing power to the still-functional engine two rather than the failing engine one.

=== Flight crew performance ===
The investigation highlighted several factors in relation to the performance of the flight crew and their past in aviation. Captain Gul had a history of excessive flight hours; an analysis of his flying hours between 2017 and 2019 showed that he flew 33% more than the average for all other PIA A320 captains and he was issued a notice by the Pakistan Civil Aviation Authority (PCAA) about exceeding duty time limitations. In 2014, he was considered for a supervisory position on ATR aircraft but was not recommended due to lack of technical knowledge and general awareness. An analysis of Gul's flights in the twelve months prior to the accident showed multiple high-speed approaches, excessively high approaches, high rates of descent, long flare distances, GPWS warnings, a lack of go-arounds, and unstabilized approaches. As part of the investigation, an aviation psychologist wrote, "He was of bossy nature, firm, dominant and overbearing. He had below average intelligence. He [tended] to have little regard for the authority. He had low mechanical comprehension with low comprehension of space relations. His level of stress tolerance was also quite inadequate." During Gul's first psychiatric evaluation, he was not recommended for a cadet pilot position by the panel at PIA. Subsequently, he got declared fit for cadet pilot by five other psychiatrists. The PIA psychiatric panel initially denied Gul's application, but after he filed a petition to the Wafaqi Mohtasib, they sided with him and he was declared fit.

First Officer Azam also had difficulties in his past. During initial simulator checks on ATR aircraft in July 2014, he passed with three "satisfactory with briefing" remarks on engine failure after V_{1}, emergency procedures, and procedure execution and adherence. Later during his initial line check in December, he passed with two more satisfactory with briefing remarks. As a result, he was placed under supervision by a PCAA inspector the next year, which withheld his promotion to A320 first officer in February 2016.

The AAIB determined that the flight crew failed to adhere to standard operating procedures and apply proper crew resources management. They listed Gul's history of having problems with approaches as a finding related to flight operations and the crash.

As the crash occurred during the Islamic holy month of Ramadan, the AAIB conducted tests and research to discover whether fasting might have impaired the flight crew's performance. During Ramadan, Muslims abstain from eating or drinking from sunrise to sunset. Fasting can affect the normal human day-night routine, circadian rhythms, levels of hydration, and blood sugar levels. PCAA regulations state that pilots shall not fly while fasting. The AAIB conducted two studies in flight simulators in relation to the effects of fasting: one to study the performance of dehydrated pilots against a control group; and one to compare the performance of pilots with low blood sugar levels against pilots with excessive blood alcohol levels, pilots exposed to excessive noise, and a control group. For the first study, results showed that dehydrated pilots had worse flight performance and spatial cognition compared to properly hydrated pilots. For the second study, results showed that pilots with low blood sugar levels deviated the most from a set vertical axis, horizontal axis, and airspeed, followed by pilots with excessive blood alcohol levels. The flight crew on Flight 8303 were likely fasting during flight; the CVR showed that a flight attendant offered them snacks, but they refused the offer. The AAIB concluded that the judgment of the flight crew was likely impaired due to the effects of fasting, although they did not determine the full extent of the consequences of this impairment. Additionally, manuals at PIA did not make it clear what the regulations on fasting were at the airline.

=== Role of ATC ===
During the accident sequence, including the belly landing, Flight 8303 was in contact with Karachi Approach ATC. During the flight, the flight crew disregarded multiple instructions from ATC to conduct an orbit to lose altitude. The AAIB noted that ATC did not communicate with the flight regarding the belly landing. The airport controller communicated via landline to the Karachi Approach controller and told him to inquire about the landing gear's position, but this was never done. Both the disregard of ATC instructions and the lack of communication between ATC and the crew were deemed as primary causes of the accident by the AAIB.

=== PIA operations and PCAA oversight ===
The AAIB examined the flight data analysis (FDA) programmes in place at PIA. FDA programmes are designed to analyze recorded flight data on a routine basis to identify patterns across them, identify risks, and build up a safety management system (SMS). An audit by the PCAA found deficiencies in PIA's implementation of their FDA. The FDA rate for the airline was less than 5%, meaning over 95% of flights were not analyzed in the FDA programme. For Captain Gul, only 6 out of his last 289 flights flown in the year before the crash were analyzed. Between June and September 2019, the European Aviation Safety Agency (EASA) assessed the SMS at PIA and deemed it insufficient due to: safety data software still under development; failure to address safety reports; failure to prove implementation of recommended training guidance; and incomplete safety performance indicators. These issues were not addressed by the time of the accident.

The PCAA oversight of PIA was also criticized by the AAIB. The AAIB determined that the oversight programme for PIA's FDA was inadequate and failed to create timely improvement. The monitoring system was ineffective at identifying CRM training failures at the airline, as shown by inadequate CRM shown during the flight.

=== Final report and recommendations ===
On 25 February 2024, the AAIB released their final report. They determined the following "primary causes" for the accident:

Aircraft made gears up landing where both engines' nacelle made contact with runway. Both Engines were damaged causing loss of engine oil and lubrication which resulted in failure of both engines during go-around.

Non-adherence to SOPs and disregard of ATC instructions during the event flight.

Lack of communication between the ATC and the flight crew regarding gears up landing particularly once aircraft was on the runway.

As "contributing causes", they listed:

Ineffective implementation of FDA programme.

FDA regulatory oversight programme was ineffective in producing sufficient and timely improvement.

Lack of clear and precise regulations to restrict flying while fasting.

Inadequate level of CRM application during the event flight.

The AAIB issued five recommendations to PIA and seven recommendations to the PCAA. Among them included recommendations to effectively implement FOQA programmes into the SMS at PIA, review CRM programmes, ensure compliance of SOPs, and more specific regulations and oversight on fasting.

== Aftermath ==
President Arif Alvi and Prime Minister Imran Khan both gave condolences in the aftermath of the accident. Several public figures and celebrities across Pakistan expressed their sadness and shock at the accident. Many international leaders and celebrities also sent their condolences. The government announced a compensation of Rs. 1 million (₨ 10 lakh, US$6,250) each for the families of those killed, and Rs. 500,000 (₨ 5 lakh, US$3,125) each for the two survivors.

=== Pilot licensing scandal and flight ban ===
On 24 June 2020, Pakistan aviation minister Ghulam Sarwar Khan revealed to the Parliament that 262 out of the 860 pilots in the country did not have authentic licenses and alleged that they paid someone else to take their exam for them. The following day, PIA spokesman Abdullah Khan announced that the airline had grounded 150 of their 434 pilots based on "bogus" licenses. (Note: Later reports indicate that far fewer Pakistani pilots actually had their license suspended. ARY News reported in July 2020 that the PCAA suspended the licenses of 48 PIA pilots. At the same time, The News International reported that seven PIA pilots lost their jobs in addition to the 48 who had their license suspended. Al Jazeera reported in September that 50 pilot licenses were revoked permanently and 32 were suspended for a year. The AAIB found that both of the crew involved in the crash had valid licenses.) On 30 June, PIA was banned from flying into the European Union for six months for failing multiple safety tests and for failing to properly implement a safety management system, as stated in a letter sent to PIA from the EASA. The EASA stated that the decision could be appealed. The EASA also banned the airline from flying to the United Kingdom. On 9 July, PIA was banned from flying to the United States. On 27 December, the EASA extended the ban for another three months, citing a lack of a safety audit. In April the following year, the ban was extended indefinitely and the EASA stated that it would remain in place until a proper safety audit on the airline had been done. On 29 November 2024, the EASA lifted the EU ban, confirming that PIA had passed its safety audit and that the PCAA had established sufficient oversight over PIA. The United Kingdom Department for Transport conducted an aviation security inspection for Pakistan in July 2025. They found that the country complied with international standards. On 16 July, the Air Safety Committee removed the ban on PIA as well as all Pakistani airlines.

== See also ==
- List of accidents and incidents involving commercial aircraft
- List of accidents and incidents involving the Airbus A320 family
- Pacific Western Airlines Flight 314 (1978) – Another accident involving a go-around after reverse thrust selection
- Malév Flight 262 (2000) — Another accident involving a go-around after belly landing

== Works cited ==
- Accident of Pakistan International Airlines Flight PIA 8303 Airbus A320-214 Aircraft Registration number AP-BLD crashed near Jinnah International Airport Karachi on 22nd May, 2020 (PDF) (Report). Aircraft Accident Investigation Board. 20 April 2023. AAIB-431. Archived (PDF) from the original on 30 December 2025.
