= Insaan Aur Devta =

1944 Urdu novel by Naseem Hijazi

- Author: Naseem Hijazi
- Language: Urdu
- Genre: Novel
- Set in: Ancient India
- Published: 1944 (first edition)
- Publication place: British India and Pakistan
- Media type: Hardcover
- Pages: 388
- ISBN: 978-9646284944

Insaan Aur Devta (Urdu: انسان اور دیوتا؛Eng: Man and Deity) is a 1944 Urdu novel by Naseem Hijazi. Set in some time in Ancient India, the novel depicts the strange relationship between human beings and their gods and the cruelties of the prevailing caste system.

== Plot ==
Raja's general Sukhdev crosses the river, determined to demolish settlements of the low-caste people, but is affected by their kindness. He was born with the ideas that the low-caste Shudra are worse than animals but he falls in love with a low-casts girl Kanwal from that settlement. Both of them escape and start living in a village of shepherds on the bank of the Ravi. Ramu, the new chief of the village, who is a very clever person, one day comes up with the idea that there is a difference between gods and goddesses, between the low castes and the high society. They have powerful gods that they worship. These gods teach them the lesson of untouchability. Because of their teachings, Brahmins treat us with hatred, take away our lands, and oppress us. If we create our own gods then gradually they will also start fearing our gods. We will make these upper castes untouchable, we will treat them the same way they have been doing to us, and when all this is done in the name of goddesses and gods, no one will be able to oppose it. Sukhdev doesn't like Ramu's idea but his son also falls in love with an upper-cast city girl. The story ends with disclosure of Sukhdev's identity as a member of a higher cast family.

== History of publication ==
The first part of Insaan Aur Devta was written in 1940. Later, the novel was completed in 1944.
