= Naya Suraj =

1977 Pakistani film

- Directed by: Masood Parvez
- Written by: Zia Sarhadi
- Produced by: Afzal Husain
- Starring: Muhammad Ali; Shabnam; Nayyar Sultana; Mustafa Qureshi; Adeeb; Saqi
- Cinematography: Masood Ur Rehman
- Edited by: Nawazish Ali
- Music by: Nisar Bazmi
- Release date: 4 November 1977
- Running time: 115 minutes
- Country: Pakistan
- Language: Urdu

Naya Suraj is a 1977 Pakistani film directed by Masood Parvez and written by Zia Sarhadi. The lead cast of the film includes Muhammad Ali, Shabnam, Nayyar Sultana, Mustafa Qureshi, Adeeb and Saqi. The plot revolves around a fictional state Shah Pur, where rebellions struggle to defeat and eliminate the tyranny.

== Plot ==
An heir of the state Shah Pur deploys a washerman as the King of the state and himself takes over the ministry of Divan, who has the full authority of taking decisions. The tyrant ruling by the Divan create conflict among the general people and they stand up against his cruel. A group of rebellions headed by a freedom fighter Umran and his mother particularly struggle against the state. A new spirit enters into the freedome movement when a bedouin dancer Sumbul joins it. Her first encounter with Umran made her to fall for him after which she helps her at several times. Due to Umran's faith power, Sikandar's (Umran's friend) devices, Sumbul's help, and people's struggle, the rebellions finally succeeded in the struggle of freedom.

== Cast ==
- Muhammad Ali
- Shabnam
- Nayyar Sultana
- Munawar Zarif
- Mustafa Qureshi
- Adeeb
- Nanha
- Saqi
- Nimmo
- Asif Khan

== Crew ==
- Director: Masood Parvez
- Writer: Zia Sarhadi
- Producer: Afzal Husain
- Editor: Nawazish Ali
- Cinematography: Masood Ur Rehman

== Soundtrack ==
The soundtrack of the film was composed by Nisar Bazmi. Masroor Anwar, Habib Jalib and Nazir Kaiser were the lyricists. Mehdi Hassan, Noor Jehan, Mehnaz and Dr. Amjad Parvez were the playback singers.

=== Track listing ===
Naya Suraj
| No. | Title | Singer (s) | Length |
|---|---|---|---|
| 1. | "Aye Naye Suraj, Hamain Tere Ujalon Ki Qasam" | Mehdi Hassan, Noor Jehan, Dr. Amajad Parvez & chorus |
