= Anmol (1973 film) =

Pakistani romantic drama film

- انمول
- Directed by: Parvez Malik
- Screenplay by: Fayyaz Hashmi, Masroor Anwar
- Story by: Jalil Afghani
- Produced by: Anis Dossani
- Starring: Shabnam; Shahid; Afzaal Ahmad; Munawar Saeed; Allauddin; Tamanna; Khalid Saleem Mota; Ishrat Chaudhary
- Cinematography: Sarwar Gul
- Music by: Nisar Bazmi
- Production company: Dusani Films
- Release date: 10 August 1973
- Country: Pakistan
- Language: Urdu

Anmol is a 1973 Pakistani Urdu romantic drama film directed by Parvez Malik. The lead cast included Shabnam, Shahid, Afzaal Ahmad, Munawar Saeed, and Allauddin. Anmol is considered the third diamond jubilee hit in the history of Lollywood. Anmol won 2 Nigar Awards in the best actress/supporting actor categories. The film is also remembered for its popular music composed by Nisar Bazmi.

== Plot ==
The story is about a brave girl Bano who fights for her right to marry her fiancé, suffering from immature personality disorder.

== Cast ==
- Shabnam as Bano
- Shahid
- Afzaal Ahmad
- Munawar Saeed
- Allauddin
- Abbas Nosha
- Jameel Bismil
- Ishrat Chaudhary
- Tamanna
- Khalid Saleem Mota
- Chakram

== Release and box office ==
Anmol was released on 10 August 1973. It was a diamond jubilee hit at the box office and completed 117 weeks at theaters.

== Music and soundtracks ==
The playback music was composed by Nisar Bazmi and lyrics were penned by Masroor Anwar:

- Abhi Aap Ki Umar Hi Kya Hay, Aji Pyar Mein Kya Rakha Hay... Singer(s): Ahmad Rushdi, Runa Laila
- Aisi Chal Main Chalun, Kaleja Hil Jaye Ga... Singer(s): Tasawar Khanum
- Hey Mera Naam Jawani... Singer(s): Runa Laila
- Ho Mila Kaisa Anari Sajna... Singer(s): Runa Laila
- Mera Mann Lehraya... Singer(s): Runa Laila
- Mujhay Nachnay Do Keh Shaid Yeh Ghunghroo... Singer(s): Runa Laila
- Pyar Insaan Ko Insaan Bana Deta Hay... Singer(s): Mehdi Hassan
- Takhti Peh Takhti, Takhti Peh Til Ka Dana Hay... Singer(s): Runa Laila

== Awards ==
Year	Film	Award	Category	Awardee	Ref.
1973	Anmol	Nigar Award	Best actress	Shabnam	
1973	Anmol	Nigar Award	Best supporting actor	Munawar Saeed	
