= Ishrat Chaudhary =

Pakistani actress (born 1958)

- عشرت چوہدری
- Born: Ishrat Chaudhary Begum; 7 August 1958 (age 67); Lahore, Punjab, Pakistan
- Other name: Cleopatra
- Education: Alhamra Arts Council
- Occupations: Actress; Dancer; Model
- Years active: 1971–1999
- Spouse: Shahid (m. 1977; div. 1982)
- Children: 1

Ishrat Chaudhary, also known as Ishrat Choudhary (Urdu: عشرت چوہدری) is a Pakistani actress and classical dancer. She was one of the most prominent stars of Lollywood during the golden era of the 1970s and 1980s. Famously nicknamed Cleopatra for her distinct, striking looks and recognized as the Dancing Queen of the industry, she built a highly prolific career spanning nearly three decades. She acted in Urdu, Punjabi, Sindhi and Pashto films and is known for her roles in films including, Phool Mere Gulshan Ka, Warrant, Jatt Kurian Tun Darda, Mohabbat Aur Dosti, Maang Meri Bhar Do, Laila Majnu, Suha Jora, Aj Diyan Kurrian, Millan, Pakeeza, Wehshi Gujjar and Maang Meri Bhar Do.

Ishrat was widely recognized as Lollywood’s premier Sex Kitten of the 1970s.

== Early life and education ==
Ishrat was born on August 7, 1958 in Lahore, Pakistan and she was the only sister of two brothers.Her family has a musician background, she and her brothers received musical training from their parents from a young age. Ishrat completed her education from Alhamra Arts Council and she was trained in classical dancing and received a certificate as the best dancer. She was performing a classical Kathak dance in a musical program which was her first performance and there film director Mumtaz Ali Khan was looking for a new actress for his upcoming Pashto film Darra Khyber. He saw Ishrat performing and cast her in the film.

== Career ==
Ishrat made her debut as an actress in Pashto film Dara Khyber in 1971. Then she went to the studio to shoot the film scenes and there actor Mustafa Qureshi was making his Urdu film Taan Seen then he saw her and he cast her in his film, which was later renamed Chand Aur Sooraj, the film was delayed and was then released in 1973 as Nadiya Kay Paar, which was Ishrat's first Urdu film.

Ishrat worked in many Urdu films in 1970s but later she also worked in Pashto and Sindhi films. In August 17, 1973, director Pervez Malik's blockbuster film Anmol was released and it was a diamond jubilee at the box office. In the film, Shabnam and Shahid and Ishrat Chaudhary were part of the cast. She portrayed the role of a dancer and the song Main Hoon Sapno Ki Rani was picturized on her.

Then she appeared in films such as Tera Gham Rahay Salamat, Bano Rani, Dulhan Rani, Dunya Gol Hay, Main Bani Dulhan, Baat Dekhdi Teri Jawani Tak, Subah Ka Tara, Parda Na Uthao, Surraya Bhopali, Phool Mere Gulshan Ka, Laila Majnu and Bhool then she also appeared in Punjabi films including Sohna Veer, Aan, Dako Te Insan, Manjhi Kathe Dahawan, Nadra, Noukar Wohti Da, Jogi and Dus Numbri.

She worked in total one hundred sixty four films, including fifty nine Urdu, eighty Punjabi, thirty two Pashto and three Sindhi. She worked in her last film which was Shamim Ara's Chupkay Chupkay, which was released in 1999 and then she retired.

== Personal life ==
She married her co-star Shahid. The couple had worked together on-screen and she met Shahid on the set of the film Goonji. She has a daughter with him but the marriage didn't last long as she filed for divorce citing irreconcilable differences but remained on good terms with him. She lives in Lahore and is friends with fellow actress Bahar Begum.

== Filmography ==
=== Film ===
Year	Title	Role
1971	Darra Khyber	Pashto
1972	Mithra Shal Millan	Sindhi
1972	Ilaqa Ghair	Pashto
1972	Qasu	Punjabi
1973	Sehray Kay Phool	Urdu
1973	Juwargar	Pashto
1973	Anmol	Urdu
1973	Albeli	Urdu
1973	Tera Gham Rahay Salamat	Urdu
1973	Nadiya Kay Paar	Urdu
1974	Samaj	Urdu
1974	Dunya Gol Hay	Urdu
1974	Main Bani Dulhan	Urdu
1974	Nadra	Punjabi
1974	Subah Ka Tara	Urdu
1974	Manji Kithay Dahvan	Punjabi
1974	Parda Na Uthao	Urdu
1974	Noukar Wohti Da	Punjabi
1974	Shikar	Urdu
1974	Ghairat Jo Saval	Sindhi / Punjabi
1974	Laila Majnu	Urdu
1974	Bhool	Urdu
1975	Saajan Rang Rangeela	Urdu
1975	Haku	Punjabi
1975	Baadal Aain Barsat	Sindhi
1975	Rutt Ja Rishta	Sindhi
1975	Mera Naa Patay Khan	Punjabi
1975	Haar Geya Insan	Urdu
1975	Aadi Mujrim	Punjabi
1975	Jogi	Punjabi
1975	Sindbad	Urdu
1975	Baz-o-Shehbaz	Pashto
1975	Zartaja	Pashto
1975	Eisar	Urdu
1975	Chhad Buray Di Yaari	Punjabi
1975	Baghi	Pashto
1975	Dharti Lal Kanwar	Sindhi
1975	Palki	Urdu
1975	Shaheed	Punjabi
1975	Kochvan	Pashto
1975	Dharti Dil Varan Ji	Sindhi
1975	Ganvar	Urdu
1975	Haivan	Urdu
1975	Doghla	Punjabi
1975	Sajjan Kamla	Punjabi
1976	Insan Aur Farishta	Urdu
1976	Sanjhi Ghairat Yaran Di	Punjabi
1976	Rastay Ka Pathar	Urdu
1976	Koshish	Urdu
1976	Anjaam	Punjabi
1976	Maan Javani Da	Punjabi
1976	Jor Barabar Da	Punjabi
1976	Warrant	Punjabi
1976	Surraya Bhopali	Urdu
1976	Shera Tay Babbra	Punjabi
1976	Ghairat	Punjabi
1976	Nasheman	Urdu
1976	Jatt Kurian Tun Darda	Punjabi
1976	Mohabbat Aur Dosti	Urdu
1976	Gama B.A.	Punjabi
1976	Dharkan	Urdu
1976	Javan Tay Medan	Punjabi
1976	Da Inteqam Lumbay	Pashto
1977	2 Chor	Punjabi
1977	3 Badshah	Punjabi
1977	Suha Jora	Punjabi
1977	Aj Diyan Kurrian	Punjabi
1977	Goonj	Urdu
1978	Millan	Urdu
1978	Aag Aur Zindagi	Urdu
1978	Barat	Urdu
1978	Sharmili	Urdu
1978	Sheeshay Ka Ghar	Urdu
1978	Pagal Tay Pyar	Punjabi
1978	Chaman Khan	Punjabi
1978	Inqilab	Urdu
1978	Akbar Amar Anthony	Punjabi
1978	Ibrat	Punjabi
1978	Ankhon Ankhon Mein	Urdu
1978	Qayamat	Urdu
1979	Qasm Khoon Di	Punjabi
1979	Paisa Bolta Hay	Urdu
1979	Griftar	Punjabi
1979	Main Nalaiq Aan	Punjabi
1979	Pakeeza	Urdu
1979	Neya Andaz	Urdu
1979	Remand	Punjabi
1979	Butt Bahadur	Punjabi
1979	Wehshi Gujjar	Punjabi
1979	Aap Say Kya Parda	Urdu
1979	Qatil Tay Farishta	Punjabi
1980	Aakhri Nishan	Punjabi
1980	Khandan	Urdu
1980	Jeeru Badnam	Punjabi
1980	Smuggler	Urdu
1980	Barkat Majethia	Punjabi
1980	Spen Stargay	Pashto
1981	Aakhri Nakha	Pashto
1981	Ik Puttar Ik Veer	Punjabi
1981	Laggan	Urdu
1981	Dara Sikandar	Punjabi
1981	Chan Suraj	Punjabi
1981	Maula Jatt Tay Noori Natt	Punjabi
1981	Tor Deyo Zanjeeran	Punjabi
1981	Ghazab	Pashto
1981	Notan Da Badshah	Punjabi
1982	Jeera Sher	Punjabi
1982	Haidar Sultan	Punjabi
1982	Aaj Aur Abhi	Urdu
1982	Ik Doli	Punjabi
1982	Da Uchey Khan	Pashto
1982	Shera	Punjabi
1982	Thori Si Bewafai	Urdu
1983	Deevangi	Urdu
1983	Maang Meri Bhar Do	Urdu
1983	Touba	Pashto
1983	Nasoor	Pashto
1986	Poti Ain Pag	Pashto
1987	Ishtehari Mujrim	Pashto
1989	Zarah Dushmani	Pashto
1999	Chupkay Chupkay	Urdu
