= Pakeeza (1979 film) =

Pakistani film

- پاکیزہ
- Directed by: Parvez Malik
- Written by: Masroor Anwar
- Produced by: Masroor Anwar
- Starring: Nadeem; Shabnam; Bindiya; Rahat Kazmi; Naveen Tajik; Ishrat Chaudhary
- Music by: M. Ashraf
- Distributed by: Aarmaan Pictures
- Release date: 20 April 1979
- Running time: 150 minutes
- Country: Pakistan
- Language: Urdu

Pakeeza (Urdu: پاکیزہ, lit. 'Pure') is a 1979 Pakistani film, directed by Parvez Malik and written and produced by Masroor Anwar. It stars Nadeem, Shabnam, Bindiya, Naveen Tajik, Ishrat Chaudhary and Rahat Kazmi in leading roles. The film was a Golden Jubilee at the box office.

== Plot ==
The story is about (Shabnam) Shabana and Irfan who are happily married but later (Nadeem) Irfan is blamed in a fraud case. Then he leaves Shabana alone and heads to a village to escape from the police there he meets (Bindiya) Bindya and marries her later they both have a son name (Rahat) Salman while Shabana raises her only daughter (Naveen) Arzoo.

== Cast ==
- Nadeem as Irfan
- Shabnam as Shabana
- Bindiya as Bindya
- Rahat Kazmi as Salman
- Naveen Tajik as Arzoo
- Qavi Khan as Shabana's older brother
- Nasira as Saeeda
- Jameel Fakhri as Policeman
- Imrozia as Lady
- Ishrat Chaudhary as Shabana's friend
- Jamshed Ansari as Shabana's father
- Albela as Captain
- Saqi as Baba
- Kemal Irani as Bindya's father
- Allaudin as Old man

== Music ==
All lyrics are written by Masroor Anwar; all music is composed by M. Ashraf

Pakeeza
No.	Title	Singer (s)	Length
1.	"Ham Na Hon Gay To Yaad Ayen Gi Hamari Baatein"	Naheed Akhtar	3:40
2.	"Is Duniya Main Kam Hee Milenge"	Mehnaz Begum	3:06
3.	"Kuch Unki Jafaon Ne Loota Kuch Unki Inayat Maar Gai"	Naheed Akhtar	3:24
4.	"Mil Jata Hain Yaar Magar Pyar Nahin Milta"	Ghulam Abbas	4:38
5.	"Tootay Dilon Ka Sahara Meray Allah Tera Naam" (A Hamd film song)	Naheed Akhtar	3:43
6.	"Tujh Say Pyar Karoon Ga"	Ghulam Abbas & Mehnaz Begum	4:39

== Awards ==
Year	Award	Category	Result	Recipients and nominees	Ref.
1979	Nigar Award	Best Actress	Won	Shabnam	
1979	Nigar Award	Best Actor	Won	Nadeem	

== Reception ==
The film was released on April 20, 1979, and it was a Golden Jubliee super hit at the box office.
