= Bank of Punjab =

Provincial bank in Punjab, Pakistan

The Bank of Punjab
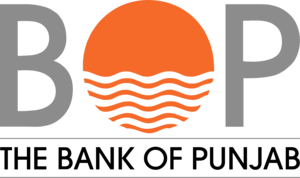
- Type: Public
- Traded as: PSX: BOP; KSE 100 component
- Industry: Banking, insurance
- Founded: 30 October 1989; 36 years ago
- Headquarters: Lahore-54660, Punjab, Pakistan
- Number of locations: 901 (2025)
- Key people: Zafar Masud (CEO)
- Products: Credit cards, consumer banking, corporate banking, finance and insurance, investment banking, mortgage loans, private banking, private equity, wealth management
- Revenue: ▲ Rs. 100.96 billion (US$360 million) (2025)
- Operating income: ▲ Rs. 35.79 billion (US$130 million) (2025)
- Net income: ▲ Rs. 15.93 billion (US$57 million) (2025)
- Total assets: ▲ Rs. 2.95 trillion (US$11 billion) (2025)
- Total equity: ▲ Rs. 93.44 billion (US$330 million) (2025)
- Number of employees: 12,924 (2025)
- Parent: Government of Punjab, Pakistan (57.5%)
- Website: bop.com.pk
- Footnotes; Financials as of 31 December 2025

The Bank of Punjab (BOP) is a Pakistani government-owned bank which is based in Lahore, Punjab. It is owned by the Government of Punjab, Pakistan.

== History ==
=== 1989–2000: Early history ===
The Bank of Punjab was founded in October 1989, pursuant to the Bank of Punjab Act 1989, by the provincial government of Punjab under the leadership of then-Chief Minister Nawaz Sharif. The initiative was part of the provincial government's efforts to utilize its financial resources to support local policy objectives during the resurgence of multi-party democracy in the late 1980s. Due to political instability in the early 1990s, the bank's establishment was delayed until 1994, when it received scheduled bank status under Chief Minister Manzoor Wattoo and approval from the State Bank of Pakistan.

In 1991, the Bank of Punjab was listed on the Karachi Stock Exchange, following an initial public offering. A year later, the bank established First Punjab Modaraba, a wholly owned subsidiary of the bank.

=== 2001–2008: Turbulent growth, controversies, and 2008 financial crisis ===
Between 2002 and 2007, the Bank of Punjab experienced significant growth, with its deposits increasing from Rs24 billion to Rs192 billion, representing an annual growth rate of 51.9 percent, which was substantially higher than the industry average of 18.3 percent. The growth was attributed to the country's economic expansion and the bank's strategic use of high-cost deposits from the private sector for lending to politically connected enterprises. However, the bank's rapid expansion was accompanied by controversies related to imprudent lending practices under Pervaiz Elahi government. One notable case involved Haris Steel, which borrowed Rs 9 billion, significantly exceeding its credit limit through fraudulent means and alleged collusion with bank officials, including then president of the bank, Hamesh Khan. Khan left Pakistan in 2007 and was later extradited from the United States to face corruption charges.

In 2008, the Bank of Punjab was on the verge of bankruptcy due to the 2008 financial crisis and a political change in Punjab. Shehbaz Sharif assumed the role of Chief Minister in June 2008 and remained in this position until 2018.

For most of 2008, the Bank of Punjab operated without a full-time CEO until Naeemuddin Khan was appointed in September.

=== 2009–present: Bailout, clean-up, and growth ===
By this time, the bank's balance sheet had suffered extensive damage, leading to a three-year delay in publishing financial statements. During this period, the Punjab government and the State Bank of Pakistan negotiated arrangements to keep the bank operational without declaring bankruptcy.

The Bank of Punjab received substantial taxpayer-funded bailouts amounting to Rs20 billion between 2009 and 2010. However, the bank still struggled to publish its financial statements, raising concerns about its stability within the financial sector. The bank also faced marginalization in the interbank lending market of KIBOR, where it had to offer government bonds as collateral to secure loans, indicating a lack of trust from other banks.

In March 2012, the Bank of Punjab disclosed financial statements for the years 2008 to 2011, revealing loan losses of Rs19.2 billion, Rs10.2 billion, and Rs3.3 billion for the respective years. These losses were particularly alarming given that the total loan portfolio prior to the crisis was Rs134 billion. The 2011 financial statements also noted an additional Rs33.1 billion in non-performing loans that were exempt from provisioning by the State Bank of Pakistan, due to an implicit guarantee from the Punjab government. Ultimately, nearly half (49 percent) of all loans issued by the Bank of Punjab prior to 2008 defaulted, highlighting mismanagement that contributed to the institution's financial crisis.

By the end of 2017, the problematic Rs33.1 billion in bad loans was reduced to Rs14 billion. In the same year, Naeemuddin Khan made the decision to fully absorb the remaining amount within the year, aiming to clean the bank's balance sheet and eliminate doubts about its financial health. As a result of this decision, the bank's financials went from a net profit of Rs4.9 billion in 2016 to a net loss of Rs3.3 billion in 2017. However, this move effectively removed the burden of the problematic loans.

In December 2018, Naeemuddin Khan stepped down from his role as president in December 2018, creating a leadership vacancy that lasted until April 2020. In April 2020, Zafar Masud was appointed as the president and CEO of the bank by the Government of Punjab, Pakistan and later was approved by the State Bank of Pakistan.

In December 2020, Pakistan Stock Exchange designated Bank of Punjab a market maker for debt securities.

== Chief executives ==
- Hamesh Khan, 2008
- Naeemuddin Khan, 2008–2018
- Zafar Masud, 2020–present
