= Tarannum Naz =

Pakistani singer (born 1958)

- ترنم ناز
- Born: Tarannum Naz; 3 October 1958 (age 67); Lahore, Pakistan
- Other name: Tarannum Naaz
- Occupations: Singer; Musician; Playback singer
- Years active: 1974 - present
- Children: 3
- Awards: Pride of Performance award by the President of Pakistan (2005); Nigar Award (1992)

Tarannum Naz is a Pakistani playback and ghazal singer.

Known for her melodious voice and classical training, she has a career spanning several decades, which includes contributing songs to films and releasing a number of albums.

== Early life and training ==
She was born in 1958 at Lahore, Pakistan. Tarannum Naz's singing career began with her performances on radio. She received early vocal training from Ustad Aashiq Hussain. She was also mentored by the legendary Pakistani singer Madam Noor Jehan, who held Naz in high regard. At the age of 16, she started singing on PTV musical shows.

== Career ==
Tarannum Naz is a versatile singer with a broad range. She is proficient in various genres and has provided her voice for many Pakistani films. Her filmography also includes work on films such as Sajjan Kamla (1975), Ajj Di Taza Khabar (1976), and Mr. 420. Notable credits include the soundtracks for Jan-E-Bahar (2017) and Rogi (2017).

She is also a noted performer of ghazals and folk songs. In 2021, she performed at the Alhamra Arts Council in Lahore for the "Funkar Hamaray" music series, where she sang popular numbers, including some of Noor Jehan's hit songs. Naz has also recorded a number of Christian worship songs.

Tarannum Naz's extensive discography includes numerous single releases and contributions to albums and film soundtracks throughout her career. In 2005, Tarannum Naz was awarded the prestigious "Pride of Performance" by the Government of Pakistan.

She has received over 200 awards throughout her career.

== Personal life ==
Tarannum Naz is married and has three children.

== Filmography ==
=== Television ===
Year	Title	Role	Network
1986	Rim Jim	Herself	PTV
1992	Mauseeqar	Herself	PTV
1999	Desan Da Raja	Herself	PTV
2011	Ghazal Night	Herself	PTV
2015	Mazaaq Raat	Herself	Geo TV

=== Film ===
Year	Title	Role
1975	Sajjan Kamla	Punjabi
1976	Ajj Di Taza Khabar	Punjabi
1977	Sangam	Urdu
1992	Mr. 420	Urdu
1992	Aaj Ka Daur	Urdu; Tarannum Naz won the Nigar Award in this film in 1992
2017	Rogi	Urdu
2017	Jan-E-Bahar	Urdu

== Discography ==
=== Studio albums ===
- PTV Hits, Vol. 15 (1979)
- Wadda Thanedar (Original Motion Picture Soundtrack) (1980)
- Maula Jatt Te Noori Natt (Original Motion Picture Soundtrack) (EP) (1981)
- 17 Top Hits from Rim Jhim (Compilation) (1986)
- Des Malangi Da (1988)
- Awaz-O-Andaz (1991)
- Aag (1991)
- Majhoo - Mehbooba (1992)
- Samunder (with Bade Ghulam Ali Khan) (1995)
- Best of Tarannum Naz (Compilation) (2013)

== Awards and recognition ==
Year	Award	Category	Result	Title	Ref.
1986	6th PTV Awards	Best Singer	Nominated	Rim Jim	
1992	Nigar Awards	Best Playback Singer	Won	Aaj Ka Daur	
2005	Pride of Performance	Government of Pakistan	Won	Arts	
