= Zafar Masud (banker) =

Pakistani banker (born 1970)

- Born: 9 October 1970 (age 55); Karachi, Pakistan
- Occupation: Banker
- Years active: 1993–present
- Father: Munawar Saeed
- Relatives: Rais Amrohvi (great-uncle); Jaun Elia (great-uncle)
- Website: zafarmasud.com

Zafar Masud (Urdu: ظفر مسعود; born 9 October 1970) is a Pakistani banker who is the chief executive officer of the Bank of Punjab since April 2020. Masud is one of two survivors of the PIA Flight 8303 crash in May 2020, in which 98 people died.

== Early life and education ==
Masud was born on 9 October 1970 to father Munawar Saeed, a veteran actor of Pakistani cinema, and mother Shahnaz Saeed. His family moved to Karachi from Amroha, India. His maternal grandfather, Taqi Amrohi, was chief editor of the Urdu newspaper Jang, a brother of the writers Rais Amrohvi and Jaun Elia, and a first cousin of the Indian film director Kamal Amrohi.

Masud holds an MBA degree at the Institute of Business Administration, Karachi.

== Career ==
Masud began his career as a banker at American Express Bank in 1994. A year later, he joined Citibank in Pakistan.

In 2005, Masud joined Dubai Islamic Bank to help establish its operations in Pakistan and headed its corporate banking division. From 2008 to 2011, he headed the Southern Africa division of Barclays.

In 2011, Masud founded Burj Capital, an investment bank which he sold to private equity in 2015.

From 2016 to 2018, Masud was the director general of National Savings.

In April 2020, Masud was appointed as the chief executive officer of the Bank of Punjab.

In March 2024, Masud was elected as the chairman of the Pakistan Banks Association.

== Air crash incident ==
On 22 May 2020, Masud was one of two survivors of the crash of Pakistan International Airlines Flight 8303. The Airbus A320 aircraft, en route from Lahore to Karachi, had initiated a go-around after an aborted first landing attempt at Jinnah International Airport in Karachi, when the flight crew issued a distress call, following which the aircraft crashed into the nearby neighbourhood of Model Colony, killing 97 of the 99 people on board.

Masud sustained multiple fractures from the crash, but was reported to be in a stable condition. Two days after the accident, Masud wrote a letter to the BOP, expressing his condolences and his intention to continue as CEO of the bank.

== Books ==
- Out of the Box: Structural Reforms for Pakistan, Vanguard Books, 2019, 196 p.
- Seat 1C: A Survivor's Tale of Hope, Resilience and Renewal, Vanguard Books, 2025, 250 p.
