= Masood Parvez =

Pakistani film director (1918–2001)

- مسعود پرویز
- Born: 1918; Amritsar, British India
- Died: 10 March 2001 (aged 82–83); Lahore, Pakistan
- Occupations: Film director, producer and actor
- Years active: 1950 – 2001
- Known for: Producing and directing the popular Punjabi-language film Heer Ranjha (1970 film)
- Relatives: Saadat Hasan Manto (his maternal uncle - called Maamoon in Urdu)
- Awards: Won 2 Nigar Awards in 1970 and 1979

Masood Parvez (1918 – 10 March 2001), also spelled as Masud Pervaiz, was a Pakistani film director known for his work in Lollywood.

He also worked in Indian films before partition of India and after migrating to Pakistan, he produced most of his work in Pakistani films where he made his directorial debut with film Beli (1950).

Beli (1950) was the first film of Sabiha Khanum and Santosh Kumar besides being directorial debut of Parvez. The film flopped at the box office due to political instabilities caused by the 1947 partition. It was also the debut film of Rashid Attre in Pakistan.

== Biography ==
A nephew of Saadat Hasan Manto, who was his uncle, Parvez was born in Amritsar, British India in 1918. Following the partition of the Indian subcontinent, he migrated to Pakistan along with Saadat Hasan Manto.

He obtained his Master of Science in Physics from the Government College, Lahore (in modern-day the Government College University, Lahore). He wanted to obtain doctorate degree in Germany, but his uncle Saadat Hasan Manto asked him to change his plan and he subsequently joined with Manto in Bombay, where he worked in a number of films as an actor. After 1947, he settled in Lahore, Pakistan where he directed and produced Urdu and Punjabi films, including Heer Ranjha.

== Death ==
Masood Parvez died in Lahore, Pakistan on 10 March 2001.

== Awards and recognition ==
- Won 2 Nigar Awards as 'Best Director' for Punjabi film Heer Ranjha (1970) and then directing Khak Aur Khoon (1979), an Urdu-language film.

== Filmography ==
#	Title	Year	Film Director	Producer
1	Beli	1950	Yes	
2	Intezar	1956	Yes	
3	Zehr-e-Ishq	1958	Yes	
4	Koel	1959	Yes	
5	Jhoomer	1959	Yes	
6	Sarhad	1966	Yes	
7	Heer Ranjha	1970	Yes	Yes
8	Naya Suraj	1977	Yes	
9	Haider Ali	1978	Yes	
10	Khaak Aur Khoon	1979	Yes	
