= Dildar Pervaiz Bhatti =

Pakistani television and a radio host (1946–1994)

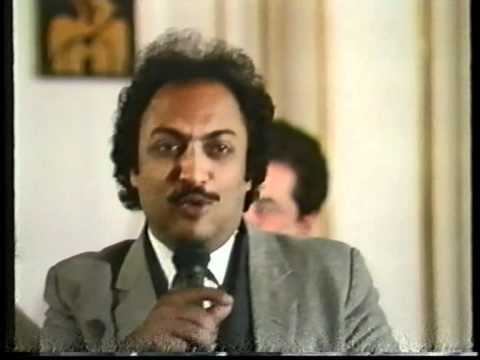
- Born: Dildar Pervaiz Bhatti; 30 November 1948; Gujranwala, Punjab, Pakistan
- Died: 30 October 1994 (aged 45); New York City, New York
- Occupations: Television and Radio host, college professor
- Years active: 1970 – 1994
- Notable work: Books titled: Amna Samna; Dildarian; Dilbar Dildar

Dildar Pervaiz Bhatti (30 November 1946 – 30 October 1994) was a Pakistani television and a radio host, college professor and TV program announcer.

== Early life and career ==
Dildar Parvaiz Bhatti was born on 30 November 1948. His early education was in Gujranwala, Pakistan. Dildar received many trophies by winning debating competitions throughout his school and college years. After finishing masters in English Literature, Dildar Pervaiz Bhatti started his career as an English lecturer at Government College, Sahiwal. Within a year, he relocated back to his home city Lahore, working at Government College University, Lahore. His second career in entertainment industry started from Radio Pakistan in the early 1970s, where he hosted a program called Sohni Dharti. The transition from radio to TV didn't take long. He tried his hand at acting in TV drama series at Pakistan Television Corporation shows as well as at live news reading. He soon realised that news reading and acting was not for him and got the opportunity to host a university challenge style TV show, "Takra" which made him a household name. His unique hosting style and quick-wittedness made him well known in Pakistan and overseas.

He kept his two careers going side by side successfully without compromising one for the other. He also wrote daily columns and worked with different newspapers. He also wrote books Amna Samna, Dildarian and Dilbar Dildar. Dildar Pervaiz compared many live entertainment shows presenting various talented artists of Pakistan. The live shows prominent Pakistani artists included Afshan Begum, Tarannum Naz, Rajab Ali, Shujat Ali Bobby, Shahida Aziz, Shaukat Ali, A. Nayyar, Akhlaq Ahmed, Surriya Khanum, Masood Rana and Naheed Akhtar.

== Television shows ==
1 - Takra in Punjabi language (1974 – 1983)

2 - Yadish Bakhair (1984 – 1986)

3 - A quiz program for young adults, "Jawan Fikar" in Urdu (1986 – 1988)

4 - "Mela" (1987 – 1990)

== Death and legacy ==
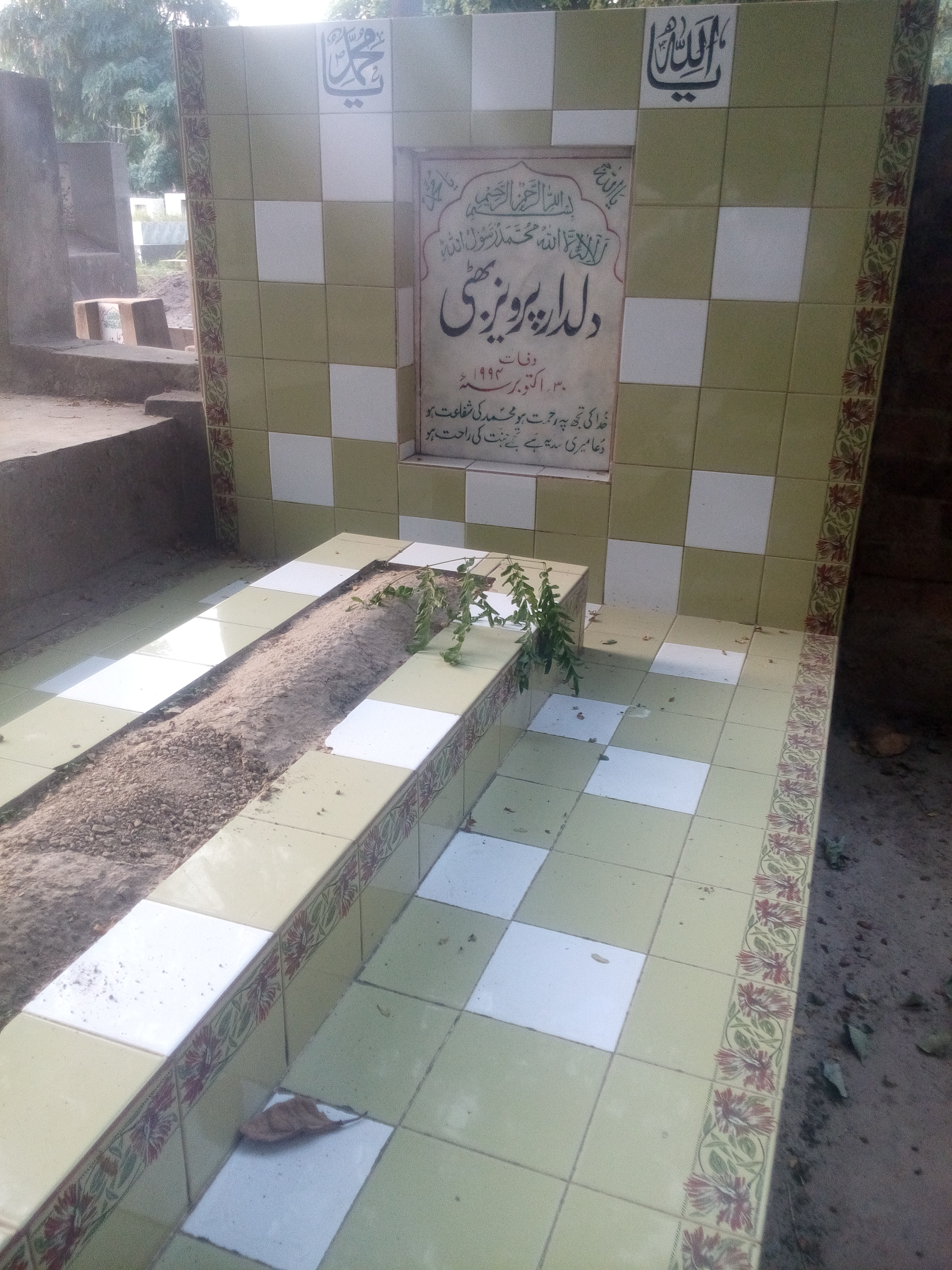
Dildar's grave at Wahdat Colony Graveyard Lahore

In 1994, Bhatti was attending several fund raising events with Imran Khan in United Kingdom, Canada and the United States to help him raise funds for this cancer hospital in honor of Imran Khan's late mother. He was one of the key persons to raise funds for this cancer hospital from the day of inception assisting Imran Khan. On 30 October 1994, after performing in 5 different cities of US, he was in New York City. Dildar Pervaiz Bhatti died after suffering brain haemorrhage. A ward of Shaukat Khanum Memorial Cancer Hospital & Research Centre was later named Dildar Ward in his honour.

== See also ==
- List of Lollywood actors
