= Naseem Hijazi =

Pakistani writer (1914–1996)

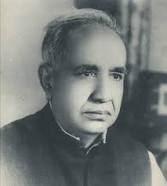
- Hussain in 1976
- Born: Sharif Hussain; 19 May 1914; Gurdaspur district, Punjab, British India
- Died: 2 March 1996 (aged 81); Lahore, Pakistan
- Occupations: Novelist; journalist
- Writing career
- Language: Urdu
- Notable awards: Pride of Performance Award in 1992

Sharif Hussain (Urdu: شریف حسین), who used the pseudonym Nasīm Hijāzī (Urdu: نسیم حجازی, commonly transliterated as Naseem Hijazi or Nasim Hijazi) (19 May 1914 – 2 March 1996), was an Urdu novelist and journalist.

== Biography ==
=== Early life ===
Sharif Hussain was born on 19 May 1914 in an Arain family in the village of Sujaanpur, near the town of Dhariwal, in the Gurdaspur district of Punjab, in pre-partition India.

=== Journalism ===
He began his career as a journalist with an Urdu-language newspaper, Daily Hayat, went on to work for Daily Zamana in Karachi, and later took a post with Weekly Tanzeem in Quetta. During this time, he was also involved with the Pakistan Movement.

After the partition of India in 1947, he migrated to Rawalpindi, Pakistan, and joined the newspaper Tameer. In 1953, he cofounded the newspaper Kohistan along with another local journalist; the paper later moved to Lahore. On 7 November 1963, under Ayub Khan's federal regime, Kohistan was banned for three months for publishing the views of Jamaat-e-Islami Pakistan, a political party opposed to Khan's regime, and Hussain was arrested. He rejoined the paper in 1969, but a year later, following the 1970 general election, it was permanently shut down.

=== Writing ===
Working as a novelist, Hussain wrote under the pseudonym Nasīm Hijāzī. He used historic settings as the background for his novels and based most of his work on Islamic history, demonstrating both the rise and fall of the Islamic Empire. His novels Muhammad Bin Qasim, Aakhri Ma'raka, Qaisar-o Kisra, and Qafla-i Hijaz describe the era of Islam's rise to political, militaristic, economic, and educational power, while Yusuf Bin Tashfain, Shaheen, Kaleesa Aur Aag, and Andheri Raat Ke Musafir describe the period of the Spanish Reconquista.

In Akhri Chataan, he depicts the Central Asian conquests of Genghis Khan and his destruction of the Khwarizm Sultanate.

Hussain wrote two sequential novels on the British Raj, and described the shortcomings of many nations within India after the collapse of the Mughal Empire. The novel Mu'azzam Ali starts a little before the Battle of Plassey. The lead character, Muazzam Ali, joins the fight against the British with the army of Siraj-ud-Daula. The story progresses as the character moves from one place in India to another in search of lost glory and freedom. He takes part in the third battle of Panipat and finally settles in Srirangapattana, which is growing in power under the towering personality of Haider Ali. The book ends around the death of Ali. The second book on the battles in the same area, Aur Talwar Toot Gayee (And the Sword Broke), is about Haider's son Sultan Tipu, where the same character is finding his dreams being fulfilled in Tipu's valiant endeavours against the British East India Company. The book culminates in Sultan Tipu's sad and untimely martyrdom.

Hussain also wrote the novel Khaak aur Khoon, which details the violence caused by religious tensions between Muslims, Sikhs, and Hindus at the time of the partition of British India and the Independence of Pakistan in 1947.

Although some historians have accused him of distorting historical facts in his novels, he has influenced many readers inside and outside Pakistan.

According to a major English-language newspaper of Pakistan, Dawn: "Hijazi was the archetypal historical novelist who moulded history according to the needs of the plots of his novels. In the tradition of 19th century European romantics, who created works of historical fiction to reinvigorate nationalist feelings, ..."

Among the notable writers of his time, Ibn-e-Safi, Saadat Hasan Manto, and Shafiq-ur-Rehman were his popular contemporaries.

=== Death ===
Hussain died on 2 March 1996, at the age of 81, in Rawalpindi.

== Publications ==
Title (Roman)	Title (English)	Title (Urdu)	Genre	Historical Period/Events	Number of Editions
Khaak aur Khoon	Dirt and Blood	خاک اور خون	Novel	British Indian Empire, Partition of India in 1947, Creation of Pakistan	5
Yousuf bin Tashfin	Yousuf Son of Tashfin	یوسف بن تاشفین	Novel	Al-Andalus, First Taifas period, Almoravid Empire, Spanish Reconquista	7
Akhari Chattan	The Last Rock	آخری چٹان	Novel	Siege of Jerusalem (1187) – Saladin captures Jerusalem from the Crusaders, Mongol invasion of Khwarezmia and Eastern Iran, Fall of Baghdad (End of Abbasid Caliphate)	7
Aakhari Maarka	The Last Battle	آخری معرکہ	Novel	Invasions of India by Mahmud of Ghazni,	3
Andheri Raat Ke Musafir	Travelers of the Dark Night	اندھیری رات کے مسافر	Novel	Spanish Reconquista, Fall of Granada published in 1988	7
Kaleesa Aur Aag	Church and Fire	کلیسا اور آگ	Novel	Spanish Reconquista, Spanish Inquisition, expulsion of the Moriscos – (continued from the end of Andheri Raat Ke Musafir), published in 1996	5
Muazzam Ali	Muazzam Ali	معظم علی	Novel	British Indian Empire, Battle of Plassey, Third Battle of Panipat, Anglo-Mysore Wars (Hyder Ali's Era), published in 1982	6
Aur Talwar Toot Gai	And the Sword Broke	اور تلوار ٹوٹ گئی	Novel	Anglo-Mysore Wars (Tipu Sultan's Era – continued from the end of 'Muazzam Ali'), published in 1964	4
Daastaan-e-Mujahid (1944)	A Soldier's Tale	داستان مجاہد	Novel	Arab Umayyad Caliphate – Muslim Conquest of Al-Andalus, Sindh, Central Asia, and Maghreb, published in 1964	5
Insaan Aur Devta	Man and God	انسان اور دیوتا	Novel	Ancient India – brutality of upper castes towards lower castes in the Hindu religion	3
Muhammad Bin Qasim	Muhammad Bin Qasim	محمد بن قاسم	Novel	Muslim Conquest of Sindh, published in 1950	6
Pakistan Se Diyare Haram Tak	From Pakistan to Sacred Land	پاکستان سے دیار حرم تک	Travelogue		
Pardesi Darakht	The Foreign Tree	پردیسی درخت	Novel	British Indian Empire, a few years before the partition of British India	2
Gumshuda Qaafley	The Lost Caravans	گمشدہ قافلے	Novel	British Indian Empire, Partition of India, Creation of Pakistan – (continued from the end of Pardesi Darakht)	
Pouras Ke Hathi	Poras's Elephants	پورس کے ہاتھی	Drama	Indo-Pakistani War of 1965	
Qafla-e-Hijaz	The Caravan of Hijaz	قافلئہ حجاز	Novel	Rashidun Caliphate, Muslim conquest of Persia	2
Qaisar-o-Kisra	Caesar and Cyrus	قیصر و کسر'ی	Novel	Byzantine–Sasanian War of 602–628, Rise of Islam on the Arabian Peninsula, published in 1988	4
Saqafat Ki Talaash	In Search of Culture	ثقافت کی تلاش	Drama, humor		3
Shaheen	The Falcon	شاہین	Novel	Spanish Reconquista, Fall of Granada (English translation of Shaheen), published in 1987	8
Sau Saal Baad	100 Years Later	سو سال بعد	Novel, humor		3
Sufaid Jazeera	The White Island	سفید جزیرہ	Novel, humor		3

== Selected adaptations ==
- Shaheen

== Awards and recognition ==
- Pride of Performance Award by the President of Pakistan in 1992
